= List of political and geographic subdivisions by total area from 7,000 to 10,000 square kilometers =

This is one of a series of comprehensive lists of continents, countries, and first level administrative country subdivisions such as states, provinces, and territories, as well as certain political and geographic features of substantial area. References for the information provided in this table may be found in the individual articles on each body listed herein. Some divisions are listed twice, with one listing including territory that is excluded in the other for various reasons, including territorial disputes. There is intentional overlap among the lists in order to maximize ease of use.

Geographic entity	Area (km^{2})	Notes
Eastern	9,996	Province of Sri Lanka.
Basilicata	9,992	Region of Italy.
Agusan del Sur	9,989.52	Province of the Philippines.
Lofa	9,982	County of Liberia.
Kinshasa	9,965	Province of the Democratic Republic of the Congo.
(Turkey) Tokat Province	9,958	Province of Turkey.
Nakhon Sawan Province	9,943	Province of Thailand.
(Equatorial Guinea) Centro Sur	9,931	Province of Equatorial Guinea.
(Russia) Lake Onega	9,891	Lake in Russia.
(Ghana) Central Region	9,826	Third smallest region of Ghana.
(Algeria) Khenchela Province	9,811	Province of Algeria.
(Cambodia) Kampong Cham Province	9,799	Province of Cambodia.
(Vietnam) Lâm Đồng Province	9,776.10	Province of Vietnam.
(New Zealand) Tasman	9,771	Unitary authority of New Zealand.
Alajuela Province	9,754	Third largest province of Costa Rica.
(Turkey) Çanakkale Province	9,737	Province of Turkey.
Vilnius County	9,729	County of Lithuania.
Marche	9,694	Region of Italy.
(Vietnam) Kon Tum Province	9,690.50	Province of Vietnam.
Gbarpolu	9,689	County of Liberia.
Treinta y Tres Department	9,676	Department of Uruguay.
(Nepal) Madhesh	9,661	Province of Nepal.
Aomori	9,645.59	Prefecture of Japan.
(Panama) Panamá	9,633	Third largest province of Panama.
(Sakon Nakhon province) Sakon Nakhon Province	9,606	Province of Thailand.
(Thailand) Nakhon Ratchasima Province	9,598	Province of Thailand.
(Morocco) Rabat-Salé-Zemmour-Zaer	9,580	Region of Morocco.
(Turkey) Samsun Province	9,579	Province of Turkey.
(Vietnam) Điện Biên Province	9,562.50	Province of Vietnam.
New Ireland Province	9,557	Province of Papua New Guinea.
Misiones Department	9,556	Department of Paraguay.
Western Region (Iceland)	9,554	Third smallest region of Iceland.
(Democratic Republic of the Congo) Kasai-Oriental	9,545	Province of the Democratic Republic of the Congo.
Carinthia	9,536	State of Austria.
(Canada) Prince Charles Island	9,521	Island in the Arctic Archipelago.
Caazapá Department	9,496	Department of Paraguay.
(Rwanda) Eastern Province	9,458	Province of Rwanda.
(Greece) West Macedonia	9,451	Region of Greece.
(Turkey) Kars Province	9,442	Province of Turkey.
Kedah	9,426	State of Malaysia.
Opole Voivodeship (Opolskie)	9,412	Smallest Voivodeship of Poland.
Autonomous Region of Bougainville	9,384	Autonomous region of Papua New Guinea.
(Algeria) Mila Province	9,375	Province of Algeria.
Rivera Department	9,370	Department of Uruguay.
Bayelsa State	9,363	State of Nigeria.
Rogaland	9,326	County of Norway.
(Laos) Louang Namtha	9,325	Province of Laos.
Yamagata	9,323.15	Prefecture of Japan.
(Papua New Guinea) Bougainville Island	9,318	Largest island of the autonomous region of Bougainville, part of Papua New Guinea.
(Alaska) Kodiak Island	9,310	Island part of the U.S. state of Alaska.
Cagayan	9,295.75	Province of the Philippines.
Río Negro Department	9,282	Department of Uruguay.
(Yemen) Al Bayda' Governorate	9,270	Governorate of Yemen.
Cyprus	9,251	Country in Europe. Includes Turkish Republic of Northern Cyprus (only recognised by Turkey) and British sovereign military bases (Akrotiri and Dhekelia).
Landes	9,243	Second largest continental department of France; third largest department of France.
(Afghanistan) Nurestan Province	9,225	Province of Afghanistan.
(Nicaragua) Jinotega	9,222	Third largest region of Nicaragua.
Aust-Agder	9,212	County of Norway.
(Greece) Epirus	9,203	Region of Greece.
Limón Province	9,189	Province of Costa Rica.
Kagoshima	9,186.94	Prefecture of Japan.
(Turkey) Karaman Province	9,163	Province of Turkey.
Banten	9,161	Province of Indonesia.
(Turkey) Elazığ Province	9,153	Province of Turkey.
(Guinea-Bissau) Gabú	9,150	Region of Guinea-Bissau.
(Algeria) Sidi Bel Abbès Province	9,150	Province of Algeria.
(Vietnam) Lai Châu Province	9,112.30	Province of Vietnam.
(Cuba) Holguín Province	9,105	Province of Cuba.
Puerto Rico	9,104	Commonwealth of the United States.
Puerto Rico (main island)	9,100	Main island of the U.S. territory of Puerto Rico.
(Algeria) Tlemcen Province	9,061	Province of Algeria.
Dordogne	9,060	Department of France.
(Izabal Department) Izabal	9,038	Second largest department of Guatemala.
Cotabato	9,008.90	Province of the Philippines.
Soriano Department	9,008	Department of Uruguay.
(United States) Pine Ridge Indian Reservation	8,984	Reservation in the United States.
(Afghanistan) Wardak Province	8,938	Province of Afghanistan.
(Turkey) Isparta Province	8,933	Province of Turkey.
Quezon	8,926.01	Province of the Philippines; includes the independent city of Lucena.
(Turkey) Mardin Province	8,891	Province of Turkey.
Northern	8,884	Province of Sri Lanka.
(Honduras) Colón	8,875	Third largest department of Honduras.
(Algeria) Médéa Province	8,866	Province of Algeria.
(Ghana) Upper East Region	8,842	Second smallest region of Ghana.
(Sisaket province) Sisaket Province	8,840	Province of Thailand.
Polynesia	8,830	An island chain subdivision of Oceania, excluding Hawaii.
(Russia) Komsomolets Island	8,812	Island in the Zevernaya Zemlya archipelago, part of Russia.
(Morocco) Gharb-Chrarda-Béni Hssen	8,805	Third smallest region of Morocco.
Bong	8,772	County of Liberia.
Côte-d'Or	8,763	Department of France.
Aveyron	8,735	Department of France.
Leeward Islands	8,713.5	Subsection of islands in the Lesser Antilles
Paraguarí Department	8,705	Department of Paraguay.
(Romania) Timiș County	8,697	Largest county of Romania.
(Chad) Logone Occidental	8,695	Region of Chad.
(Alta Verapaz Department) Alta Verapaz	8,686	Third largest department of Guatemala.
Corsica	8,680	Island in the Mediterranean Sea and smallest region of Metropolitan France.
(Namibia) Oshana	8,653	Smallest region of Namibia.
(Greenland) Disko Island	8,612	Island part of Greenland.
(Kalasin province) Kalasin Province	8,608	Province of Thailand.
South Chungcheong Province	8,586	Third smallest province of South Korea.
Osun	8,585	State of Nigeria.
Saône-et-Loire	8,575	Department of France.
(Romania) Suceava County	8,553	Second largest county of Romania.
(Burkina Faso) Plateau-Central	8,545	Region of Burkina Faso.
Örebro County	8,519	County of Sweden.
(Romania) Caraș-Severin County	8,514	Third largest county of Romania.
Carney Island	8,500	Island part of Antarctica.
Uva	8,500	Province of Sri Lanka.
(Romania) Tulcea County	8,499	County of Romania.
Hiroshima	8,479.45	Prefecture of Japan.
(Chile) Chiloé Island	8,478	Island part of Chile.
Indonesia Buru	8,473	Island part of Indonesia.
(Togo) Savanes	8,470	Second smallest region of Togo.
Kronoberg County	8,458	County of Sweden.
Umbria	8,456	Region of Italy.
(Cuba) Granma Province	8,452	Province of Cuba.
Šiauliai County	8,540	County of Lithuania.
(Bács-Kiskun County) Bács-Kiskun	8,445	Largest county of Hungary.
Abkhazia	8,432	Autonomous republic of Georgia.
Hyōgo	8,400.96	Prefecture of Japan.
Pa'O	8,386	Self-administered zone in Myanmar.
(Guatemala) El Quiché	8,378	Department of Guatemala.
(Kenya) Western Province	8,361	Second smallest Province of Kenya.
(New Zealand) Gisborne (or East Coast)	8,355	Unitary authority of New Zealand.
(Greece) Crete	8,336	Region of Greece.
(Vietnam) Lạng Sơn Province	8,331.20	Province of Vietnam.
(Yemen) Hajjah Governorate	8,300	Governorate of Yemen.
(Roi Et province) Roi Et Province	8,299	Province of Thailand.
(North Korea) South Hwanghae Province	8,294	Second smallest province of North Korea.
Andaman and Nicobar Islands	8,249	Union Territory of India.
(Turkey) Muş Province	8,196	Province of Turkey.
Marne	8,162	Department of France.
(North Korea) North Hwanghae Province	8,154	Smallest province of North Korea.
(New Zealand) Wellington	8,140	Region of New Zealand.
Lake Titicaca	8,135	Lake in South America between Bolivia and Peru.
(Turkey) Bingöl Province	8,125	Province of Turkey.
(Surin province) Surin Province	8,124	Province of Thailand.
Kaunas County	8,089	County of Lithuania.
(Afghanistan) Daykundi Province	8,088	Province of Afghanistan.
(Cuba) Villa Clara Province	8,069	Province of Cuba.
(Vietnam) Quảng Bình Province	8,065.30	Province of Vietnam.
North Jeolla Province	8,050	Second smallest province of South Korea.
(Afghanistan) Kunduz Province	8,040	Province of Afghanistan.
North Yorkshire	8,038	Largest administrative county of England.
Madrid	8,028	Autonomous community of Spain.
(Malawi) Kasungu	8,017	District of Malawi.
Galápagos Province	8,010	Province of Ecuador.
(Turkey) Aydın Province	8,007	Province of Turkey.
Lake Nicaragua	8,001	Lake in Nicaragua.
Republic of North Ossetia–Alania	8,000	Federal subject of Russia.
(Eritrea) Southern region	8,000	Region in Eritrea.
Puy-de-Dôme	7,970	Department of France.
Negros Occidental	7,965.21	Province of the Philippines; includes the independent city of Bacolod.
(Botswana) Kgatleng District	7,960	Third smallest district of Botswana.
Selangor	7,956	State of Malaysia.
Miranda	7,950	State of Venezuela.
(Honduras) Francisco Morazán	7,946	Department of Honduras.
(Vietnam) Hà Giang Province	7,945.80	Province of Vietnam.
(Canada) Anticosti Island	7,941	Island part of Canada.
(Honduras) Yoro	7,939	Department of Honduras.
Grand Bassa	7,936	County of Liberia.
(Senegal) Fatick Region	7,935	Region of Senegal.
Ez Zeraf Island	7,929	Island in South Sudan.
Lake Athabasca	7,920	Lake in Canada.
Roosevelt Island	7,910	Island part of Antarctica.
(North Denmark Region) North Jutland Region	7,907.09	Region of Denmark.
(Uzbekistan) Namangan Region	7,900	Region of Uzbekistan.
(Yemen) 'Amran Governorate	7,900	Governorate of Yemen.
Iloilo	7,899.35	Province of the Philippines; includes the independent city of Iloilo.
Caldas Department	7,888	District of Colombia.
North Western	7,888	Province of Sri Lanka.
(Georgia (country)) Shida Kartli	7,882	Second largest region of Georgia.
Panevėžys County	7,881	County of Lithuania.
(Russia) Wrangel Island	7,866	Island part of Russia.
Friuli-Venezia Giulia	7,855	Region of Italy.
(Uttaradit province) Uttaradit Province	7,839	Province of Thailand.
(Vietnam) Bình Thuận Province	7,836.90	Province of Vietnam.
Shizuoka	7,777.42	Prefecture of Japan.
(Turkey) Tunceli Province	7,774	Province of Turkey.
(Romania) Arad County	7,754	County of Romania.
French Southern and Antarctic Lands	7,747	French Territory Adelie Land.
Miyazaki	7,735.31	Prefecture of Japan.
(Afghanistan) Nangarhar Province	7,727	Province of Afghanistan.
Azuay Province	7,701	Province of Ecuador.
Province of Sassari	7,691.75	Largest province of Italy.
(Laos) Xekong	7,665	Province of Laos.
Pyrénées-Atlantiques	7,645	Department of France.
(Algeria) Oum El Bouaghi Province	7,638	Province of Algeria.
(Turkey) Aksaray Province	7,626	Province of Turkey.
Maguindanao	7,623.75	Province of the Philippines; includes the independent city of Cotabato.
(Bulgaria) Burgas Province	7,618	Largest province of Bulgaria.
(Turkey) Adıyaman Province	7,614	Province of Turkey.
Republic of Adygea	7,600	Third smallest federal subject of Russia.
(Yemen) Dhamar Governorate	7,590	Governorate of Yemen.
(Jordan) Amman	7,579	Governorate of Jordan, its capital Amman is also the country's capital.
Abuja Federal Capital Territory	7,569	Federal Capital Territory of Nigeria (analogous to a state).
Plzeň Region	7,561	Third largest region of the Czech Republic.
Enugu	7,560	State of Nigeria.
(Romania) Bihor County	7,544	County of Romania.
(Nicaragua) Río San Juan	7,541	Region of Nicaragua.
County Cork	7,508	Largest county of the Republic of Ireland, in the province of Munster.
Canary Islands	7,447	Autonomous community of Spain.
(Turkey) Artvin Province	7,436	Province of Turkey.
North Chungcheong Province	7,432	Smallest province of South Korea.
Isère	7,431	Department of France.
Yonne	7,427	Department of France.
(Romania) Dolj County	7,414	County of Romania.
Kumamoto	7,409.35	Prefecture of Japan.
(Papua New Guinea) New Ireland (island)	7,405	Island part of Papua New Guinea.
Huehuetenango	7,400	Department of Guatemala.
Trujillo	7,400	State of Venezuela.
South Tyrol	7,397.86	Second largest and autonomous province of Italy.
(Songkhla province) Songkhla Province	7,394	Province of Thailand.
(Portugal) Évora	7,393	District of Portugal.
(Turkey) Çankırı Province	7,388	Province of Turkey.
Aisne	7,369	Department of France.
(Philippines) Leyte	7,368	Island part of the Philippines.
Chernivtsi Oblast	7,359	Smallest oblast of Ukraine; third smallest political subdivision of Ukraine.
Allier	7,340	Department of France.
(Senegal) Ziguinchor Region	7,339	Region of Senegal.
Nong Khai Province	7,332	Province of Thailand.
(Turkey) Niğde Province	7,312	Province of Turkey.
Zamboanga del Norte	7,301.00	Province of the Philippines.
(Senegal) Sédhiou Region	7,293	Region of Senegal.
Miyagi	7,282.22	Prefecture of Japan.
Vest-Agder	7,281	County of Norway.
(Bulgaria) Sofia Province	7,277	Second largest province of Bulgaria.
(Angola) Cabinda Province	7,270	Second smallest province of Angola.
Region Zealand	7,268.75	Region of Denmark.
(New Zealand) Taranaki	7,257	Third smallest region of New Zealand.
(Borsod-Abaúj-Zemplén County) Borsod-Abaúj-Zemplén	7,247	Second largest county of Hungary.
Cher	7,235	Department of France.
Basque Country	7,234	Autonomous community of Spain.
(Honduras) El Paraíso	7,218	Department of Honduras.
(French Southern and Antarctic Lands) Kerguelen Islands	7,215	Second largest district of the French Southern and Antarctic Lands.
(Lithuania) Utena County	7,201	County of Lithuania.
(Djibouti) Dikhil Region	7,200	Largest region of Djibouti.
(Sa Kaeo province) Sa Kaeo Province	7,195	Province of Thailand.
South Moravian Region	7,194.56	Region of the Czech Republic.
(Turkey) Şırnak Province	7,172	Province of Turkey.
Maine-et-Loire	7,166	Department of France.
(Salzburg (state)) Salzburg	7,154	State of Austria.
(Turkey) Hakkâri Province	7,121	Province of Turkey.
Okayama	7,114.50	Prefecture of Japan.
Graubünden	7,105	Largest canton of Switzerland.
(Laos) Xaisomboun	7,105	Third smallest province of Laos.
Kōchi	7,103.93	Prefecture of Japan.
(Djibouti) Tadjourah Region	7,100	Second largest region of Djibouti.
Yaracuy	7,100	State of Venezuela.
Sikkim	7,096	State of India.
(Romania) Constanța County	7,071	County of Romania.
(Romania) Hunedoara County	7,063	County of Romania.
(Falkland Islands) East Falkland	7,040	Biggest island in the Falkland Islands.
(Denmark) Zealand (Sjælland)	7,031	Island part of Denmark.
(Cambodia) Kampong Speu Province	7,017	Province of Cambodia.
Aragua	7,014	State of Venezuela.
(Morocco) Chaouia-Ouardigha	7,010	Second smallest region of Morocco.
(Apulia) Province of Foggia	7,007	Third largest province of Italy.
(Oman) Al Buraimi Governorate	7,000	Third largest governorate of Oman.

== See also ==
Other divisions

- 0.1 to 1,000,000+ square kilometers
- 1,000,000+ square kilometers

Smaller divisions

- 200,000+ square kilometers • 100,000 to 1,000,000 square kilometers • 50,000 to 200,000 square kilometers • 20,000 to 50,000 square kilometers
- 5,000 to 20,000 square kilometers • 1,000 to 5,000 square kilometers • 0.1 to 1,000 square kilometers
- 500,000 to 1,000,000 square kilometers • 200,000 to 500,000 square kilometers • 100,000 to 200,000 square kilometers
- 50,000 to 100,000 square kilometers • 30,000 to 50,000 square kilometers • 20,000 to 30,000 square kilometers • 10,000 to 20,000 square kilometers
- 7,000 to 10,000 square kilometers • 5,000 to 7,000 square kilometers • 3,000 to 5,000 square kilometers • 1,000 to 3,000 square kilometers
- 250 to 1,000 square kilometers • 50 to 250 square kilometers • Under 50 square kilometers

Other

- List of countries and dependencies by area
- List of largest empires
- List of administrative divisions by country
- Category:Ranked lists of country subdivisions
