= List of political and geographic subdivisions by total area from 30,000 to 50,000 square kilometers =

This is one of a series of comprehensive lists of continents, countries, and first level administrative country subdivisions such as states, provinces, and territories, as well as certain political and geographic features of substantial area. References for the information provided in this table may be found in the individual articles on each body listed herein. Some divisions are listed twice, with one listing including territory that is excluded in the other for various reasons, including territorial disputes. There is intentional overlap among the lists in order to maximize ease of use.

Geographic entity	Area (km^{2})	Notes
(Central African Republic) Ouaka	49,900	Prefecture of the Central African Republic.
Smolensk Oblast	49,800	Federal subject of Russia.
Bago Region	49,787	Second largest region of Myanmar, fourth largest administrative entity (Myanmar has certain administrative divisions titled as Regions, and others titled as States).
(Jämtland County) Jamtland County	49,444	Third largest county of Sweden.
(Tanzania) Singida	49,341	Region of Tanzania.
Benishangul-Gumuz Region	49,289	Region of Ethiopia.
(Zimbabwe) Midlands	49,166	Province of Zimbabwe.
Alexander Island	49,070	Island part of Antarctica.
Slovakia	49,033	Country in Europe.
(Russia) Severny Island	48,904	Island part of Novaya Zemlya in Russia.
Eastern Finland	48,726	Second smallest province of Finland.
(Bulgan Province) Bulgan	48,700	Aimag of Mongolia.
Dominican Republic	48,671	Country in the Caribbean. Includes The Mainland Dominican Republic, Saona Island, and others under Control Of Dominican Government
Finnmark	48,637	Largest county of Norway.
(Afghanistan) Farah Province	48,471	Province of Afghanistan.
(Namibia) Okavango Region	48,463	Region of Namibia.
(Nigeria) Bauchi State	48,197	State of Nigeria.
Tierra del Fuego	48,100	Archipelago in southern South America.
Isla Grande de Tierra del Fuego	47,992	Island divided between Chile and Argentina.
East Java	47,922	Province of Indonesia.
(Tanzania) Manyara	47,913	Region of Tanzania.
East Nusa Tenggara	47,876	Province of Indonesia.
Bourgogne-Franche-Comté	47,784	Region of France.
Aragon	47,719	Autonomous community of Spain.
Lower Saxony	47,618	Second largest state of Germany.
Estonia	47,549	Country in Northern Europe. De jure size – 2,321 km^{2} were annexed by Russia.
(Cameroon) South Province	47,110	Province of Cameroon.
Maluku	46,975	Province of Indonesia.
Muisca Confederation	46,972	Loose confederation of Muisca speaking chiefdoms in central Colombia until 1540
(Chad) Wadi Fira	46,850	Region of Chad.
(Mauritania) Inchiri	46,800	Region of Mauritania.
(Burkina Faso) Est	46,694	Region of Burkina Faso.
Chocó Department	46,530	District of Colombia.
(Central African Republic) Vakaga	46,500	Prefecture of the Central African Republic.
Espírito Santo	46,078	State of Brazil.
(Gabon) Ogooué-Ivindo	46,075	Largest province of Gabon.
Galmudug	46,000	Historic region of Somalia.
Moscow Oblast	45,900	Federal subject of Russia.
(Sudan) Blue Nile	45,844	State of Sudan.
(Bayan-Ölgii Province) Bayan-Ölgii	45,700	Aimag of Mongolia.
(Iran) East Azarbaijan Province	45,650	Province of Iran.
(Angola) Lunda Sul Province	45,649	Province of Angola.
Kingdom of Asturias	45,409	A post Visigothic Kingdom in the Iberian peninsula after the Muslim conquest, lasting from 785–925.
Estonia	45,228	Country in Northern Europe. Includes 1,520 islands in the Baltic Sea. De facto size – the remaining 2,321 km^{2} were annexed by Russia.
(Tanzania) Kigoma	45,066	Region of Tanzania.
(Nigeria) Yobe State	44,880	State of Nigeria.
Magway Region	44,799	Region of Myanmar (Myanmar has certain administrative divisions titled as Regions, and others titled as States).
Casanare Department	44,640	District of Colombia.
(New Zealand) Canterbury	44,638	Largest region of New Zealand.
(Nigeria) Kaduna State	44,217	State of Nigeria.
Haryana	44,212	State of India.
Naryn Region	44,160	Largest region of Kyrgyzstan.
Astrakhan Oblast	44,100	Federal subject of Russia.
(Afghanistan) Badakhshan Province	44,059	Province of Afghanistan.
Berkner Island	43,873	Island part of Antarctica.
(Department of Ayacucho) Ayacucho Region	43,815	Region of Peru.
Transkei	43,798	Unrecognised Bantustan of South Africa.
Issyk-Kul Region	43,735	Second largest region of Kyrgyzstan.
Rio de Janeiro	43,696	State of Brazil.
East Sepik Province	43,426	Second largest province of Papua New Guinea.
Tanintharyi Region	43,328	Region of Myanmar (Myanmar has certain administrative divisions titled as Regions, and others titled as States).
Anzoátegui	43,300	State of Venezuela.
Penza Oblast	43,200	Federal subject of Russia.
(Canada) Axel Heiberg Island	43,178	Island in the Arctic Archipelago.
Denmark	43,094	Country in Europe. Includes Denmark proper only; the entire Kingdom of Denmark, including Greenland and Faroe Islands covers 2,220,093 km^{2}.
(Madagascar) Antsiranana Province	43,046	Smallest Province of Madagascar.
(Senegal) Tambacounda Region	42,706	Largest region of Senegal.
Upper Peninsula of Michigan	42,610	Geographic subdivision of the U.S. State of Michigan.
Kingdom of the Netherlands	42,437	Country in Europe and the Caribbean.
Southern Cameroons	42,383	Area claimed by the Republic of Ambazonia in Cameroon.
West Sumatra	42,297	Province of Indonesia.
(Canada) Melville Island	42,149	Island in the Arctic Archipelago.
Udmurt Republic	42,100	Federal subject of Russia.
Greater Pibor	41,962	An administrative area in South Sudan.
(Republic of the Congo) Cuvette	41,800	Third largest department of the Republic of the Congo. Area is approximate, as sources conflict.
Extremadura	41,634	Autonomous community of Spain.
Netherlands	41,528	Country in Europe. Includes the Netherlands proper only.
(Tanzania) Dodoma	41,311	Region of Tanzania.
Switzerland	41,284	Country in Europe.
(Canada) Southampton Island	41,214	Island in the Arctic Archipelago.
(Selenge Province) Selenge	41,200	Aimag of Mongolia.
(Tarapacá Region) Tarapacá	41,200	Region of Chile.
(Afghanistan) Nimruz Province	41,005	Province of Afghanistan.
(Syria) Homs	40,940	Largest governorate of Syria.
Minsk Region	40,800	Largest province of Belarus.
Gomel Region (Homiel Region)	40,400	Second largest province of Belarus.
(Lakes (state)) Lakes	40,235	State of South Sudan.
(Ivory Coast) Savanes District	40,210	Largest district of Côte d'Ivoire.
Delta Amacuro	40,200	State of Venezuela.
(Angola) Zaire Province	40,130	Province of Angola.
(Brazil) Marajó	40,100	Island part of Brazil, world's largest fluvial island.
Vitebsk Region (Vitsebsk Region)	40,100	Third largest province of Belarus.
(Coquimbo Region) Coquimbo	39,647	Region of Chile.
(Tanzania) Kagera	39,627	Region of Tanzania.
Ryazan Oblast	39,600	Federal subject of Russia.
(Ghana) Brong-Ahafo Region	39,557	Second largest region of Ghana.
(Yemen) Al Jawf Governorate	39,500	Third largest governorate of Yemen.
Eastern Region, Uganda	39,478.8	Smallest region of Uganda.
(Uzbekistan) Buxoro Region	39,400	Third largest region of Uzbekistan.
(Peru) Amazonas	39,249	Department of Peru
Centre-Val de Loire	39,151	Region of France.
(Yemen) Shabwah Governorate	39,000	Governorate of Yemen.
(Norway) Spitsbergen	38,981	Island part of Svalbard, Norway.
Kerala	38,863	State of India.
(Namibia) Oshikoto Region	38,653	Region of Namibia.
(Niger) Maradi Department	38,581	Department of Niger.
(Gabon) Woleu-Ntem	38,465	Second largest province of Gabon.
Nordland	38,463	County of Norway.
Yucatán	38,402	State of Mexico.
(Republic of the Congo) Plateaux	38,400	Department of the Republic of the Congo.
Bhutan	38,394	Country in Asia.
(Ivory Coast) Zanzan District	38,251	Second largest district of Côte d'Ivoire.
(Turkey) Konya Province	38,157	Largest province of Turkey.
Southeast Sulawesi	38,140	Province of Indonesia.
(Nigeria) Adamawa State	37,957	State of Nigeria.
(Sudan) Sennar	37,844	State of Sudan.
(Gabon) Ngounié	37,750	Third largest province of Gabon.
Junín Region	37,667	Region of Peru.
(Guinea) Nzérékoré Region	37,658	Second largest region of Guinea.
Tarija Department	37,623	Smallest department of Bolivia.
(Iran) West Azarbaijan Province	37,437	Province of Iran.
Ulyanovsk Oblast	37,300	Federal subject of Russia.
Polynesia	37,141	An island chain subdivision of Oceania, including Hawaii.
(Namibia) Khomas Region	37,007	Region of Namibia.
(Oman) Ad Dhahirah Governorate	37,000	Second largest governorate of Oman.
South Kalimantan	36,985	Province of Indonesia.
(Peru) Huánuco Region	36,849	Region of Peru.
(Japan) Kyushu	36,782	Third-largest island of Japan, region containing the prefectures of Fukuoka, Saga, Nagasaki, Kumamoto, Ōita, Miyazaki, Kagoshima and Okinawa.
Rakhine State	36,762	State of Myanmar (Myanmar has certain administrative divisions titled as Regions, and others titled as States).
(Sudan) Kassala	36,710	State of Sudan.
(Mauritania) Assaba	36,600	Region of Mauritania.
(Gabon) Haut-Ogooué	36,547	Province of Gabon.
(Afghanistan) Ghor Province	36,479	Province of Afghanistan.
(Zimbabwe) Manicaland	36,459	Third smallest province of Zimbabwe.
Yaroslavl Oblast	36,400	Federal subject of Russia.
Ash Sharqiyah Region (Oman)	36,400	Largest region of Oman.
Nigeria Kebbi State	36,320	State of Nigeria.
Republic of China	36,188	Territory with disputed status in Asia. Includes only the territories under the administration of the ROC, namely Taiwan, Penghu, Kinmen, and Matsu.
Guinea-Bissau	36,125	Country in Africa.
Chin State	36,009	State of Myanmar (Myanmar has certain administrative divisions titled as Regions, and others titled as States).
(Biobío Region) Biobío	36,007	Region of Chile.
Jewish Autonomous Oblast	36,000	Federal subject of Russia.
Pahang	35,964	Third largest state of Malaysia.
(Unity State) Unity	35,956	State of South Sudan.
Northern Province, Sierra Leone	35,936	Largest province of Sierra Leone.
Ancash Region	35,914	Region of Peru.
(Department of Piura) Piura Region	35,892	Region of Peru.
(Botswana) Kweneng District	35,890	District of Botswana.
(Petén Department) Petén	35,854	Largest department of Guatemala.
Sandaun Province	35,820	Third largest province of Papua New Guinea.
Taiwan	35,801	Largest island under the governance of the Republic of China, referenced elsewhere in this list.
Baden-Württemberg	35,752	Third largest state of Germany.
Masovian Voivodeship (Mazowieckie)	35,728	Largest Voivodeship of Poland.
(Guinea) Faranah Region	35,581	Third largest region of Guinea.
(China) Taiwan	35,581	Province of Taiwan according to the People's Republic of China.
Lampung	35,376	Province of Indonesia.
(Burkina Faso) Sahel	35,360	Region of Burkina Faso.
(China) Hainan	35,354	Smallest province of China.
Barinas	35,200	State of Venezuela.
Ayeyarwady Region	35,167	Region of Myanmar (Myanmar has certain administrative divisions titled as Regions, and others titled as States).
(Papua New Guinea) New Britain	35,145	Island part of Papua New Guinea.
Maakhir	35,000	Historic region of Somalia.
Bryansk Oblast	34,900	Federal subject of Russia.
West Java	34,817	Province of Indonesia.
Lima Region	34,802	Region of Peru.
(Tanzania) Arusha	34,516	Region of Tanzania.
Gulf Province	34,472	Province of Papua New Guinea.
Southern Finland	34,378	Smallest province of Finland.
(Burkina Faso) Boucle du Mouhoun	34,333	Region of Burkina Faso.
Tambov Oblast	34,300	Federal subject of Russia.
(Angola) Huambo Province	34,274	Province of Angola.
Mandalay Region	34,253	Region of Myanmar (Myanmar has certain administrative divisions titled as Regions, and others titled as States).
(Cameroon) Far North Province	34,246	Province of Cameroon.
(Bangladesh) Rajshahi Division	34,235	Largest division of Bangladesh.
North Rhine-Westphalia	34,043	State of Germany.
(China) Hainan	34,000	Province of China.
(Republic of the Congo) Pool	33,955	Department of the Republic of the Congo.
Puebla	33,902	State of Mexico.
Moldova	33,851	Country in Europe. Includes Transnistria (Pridnestrovie).
(Mauritania) Brakna	33,800	Region of Mauritania.
(Nigeria) Kwara State	33,792	State of Nigeria.
Morobe Province	33,705	Province of Papua New Guinea.
(Nigeria) Zamfara State	33,667	State of Nigeria.
(South Sudan) North Bahr-al-Ghazal	33,558	State of South Sudan.
(Canada) Prince of Wales Island	33,339	Island part of the Arctic Archipelago.
(Department of Cajamarca) Cajamarca Region	33,318	Region of Peru.
Odesa Oblast	33,310	Largest oblast of Ukraine.
Nariño Department	33,268	District of Colombia.
(Russia) Yuzhny Island	33,246	Island part of Novaya Zemlya in Russia.
(Eritrea) Gash-Barka region	33,200	Region in Eritrea.
South Sinai Governorate	33,140	Governorate of Egypt.
(Japan) Kansai region	33,125.7	Region of Japan containing the prefectures of Mie, Shiga, Kyōto, Ōsaka, Hyōgo, Nara and Wakayama.
North Caribbean Coast Autonomous Region	33,106	Largest region of Nicaragua.
(Syria) Deir ez-Zor	33,060	Second largest governorate of Syria.
(Australia) Daly River	33,000	Township in the Northern Territory of Australia.
Lake Tanganyika	32,893	Lake in Africa between Tanzania, Democratic Republic of the Congo, Burundi, and Zambia; second deepest lake in the world.
(Jordan) Ma'an	32,832	Governorate of Jordan.
(Bangladesh) Chittagong Division	32,696	Second largest division of Bangladesh.
Central Java	32,548	Province of Indonesia.
(Araucanía Region) Araucanía	32,472	Region of Chile.
(Japan) Kantō region	32,429.59	Region of Japan containing the prefectures of Ibaraki, Tochigi, Gunma, Saitama, Chiba, Tōkyō and Kanagawa.
Jalal-Abad Region	32,418	Region of Kyrgyzstan.
(Tanzania) Pwani	32,407	Region of Tanzania.
Brest Region	32,300	Third smallest province of Belarus.
Minya Governorate	32,279	Governorate of Egypt.
(Zimbabwe) Mashonaland East	32,230	Second smallest province of Zimbabwe.
(Nigeria) Sokoto State	32,146	State of Nigeria.
Maryland	32,133	State of the United States.
Catalonia	32,114	Autonomous community of Spain.
(Central African Republic) Ouham-Pendé	32,100	Prefecture of the Central African Republic.
Pays de la Loire	32,082	Region of France.
(New Zealand) Southland	32,079	Second largest region of New Zealand.
(Greenland) Kujalleq	32,000	Smallest municipality of Greenland.
Dnipropetrovsk Oblast	31,974	Second largest oblast of Ukraine.
(Japan) Chūgoku region	31,921.54	Region of Japan containing the prefectures of Tottori. Shimane, Okayama, Hiroshima and Yamaguchi.
(Oman) Ad Dakhiliyah Governorate	31,900	Third largest governorate of Oman.
Chernihiv Oblast	31,865	Third largest oblast of Ukraine.
(Central African Republic) Ombella-M'Poko	31,835	Prefecture of the Central African Republic.
Hauts-de-France	31,806	Region of France.
(Angola) Benguela Province	31,788	Province of Angola.
Lake Baikal	31,500	Lake in Russia. Deepest and largest volume lake in the world.
Kharkiv Oblast	31,415	Oblast of Ukraine.
Provence-Alpes-Côte d'Azur	31,400	Region of France.
(Angola) Bengo Province	31,371	Province of Angola.
(Zambia) Copperbelt Province	31,328	Province of Zambia.
(British Columbia) Vancouver Island	31,285	Island of British Columbia, Canada
(New Zealand) Otago	31,241	Third largest region of New Zealand.
(Guinea) Boké Region	31,186	Region of Guinea.
(Morocco) Marrakech-Tensift-El Haouz	31,160	Region of Morocco.
(Ivory Coast) Woroba District	31,088	Third largest district of Côte d'Ivoire.
Great Bear Lake	31,080	Lake in Canada.
(Ivory Coast) Montagnes District	31,050	District of Côte d'Ivoire.
(South Sudan) Warap	31,027	State of South Sudan.
(Niger) Dosso Region	31,002	Department of Niger.
North Maluku	30,895	Province of Indonesia.
(Bangladesh) Dhaka Division	30,772	Third largest division of Bangladesh.
(Nigeria) Benue State	30,755	State of Nigeria.
(Tanzania) Mwanza	30,548	Region of Tanzania.
Santander Department	30,537	District of Colombia.
Belgium	30,528	Country in Europe.
(Maule Region) Maule	30,518	Region of Chile.
Guanajuato	30,491	State of Mexico.
(Sudan) White Nile	30,411	State of Sudan.
Lesotho	30,355	Country in Africa.
(Central African Republic) Mambéré-Kadéï	30,203	Prefecture of the Central African Republic.
(Tanzania) Mara	30,150	Region of Tanzania.
Lake Malawi	30,044	Lake in Africa between Malawi, Mozambique, and Tanzania.
Wa State	30,000	De facto independent state in Myanmar.

== See also ==
Other divisions

- 0.1 to 1,000,000+ square kilometers
- 1,000,000+ square kilometers

Smaller divisions

- 200,000+ square kilometers • 100,000 to 1,000,000 square kilometers • 50,000 to 200,000 square kilometers • 20,000 to 50,000 square kilometers
- 5,000 to 20,000 square kilometers • 1,000 to 5,000 square kilometers • 0.1 to 1,000 square kilometers
- 500,000 to 1,000,000 square kilometers • 200,000 to 500,000 square kilometers • 100,000 to 200,000 square kilometers
- 50,000 to 100,000 square kilometers • 30,000 to 50,000 square kilometers • 20,000 to 30,000 square kilometers • 10,000 to 20,000 square kilometers
- 7,000 to 10,000 square kilometers • 5,000 to 7,000 square kilometers • 3,000 to 5,000 square kilometers • 1,000 to 3,000 square kilometers
- 250 to 1,000 square kilometers • 50 to 250 square kilometers • Under 50 square kilometers

Other

- List of countries and dependencies by area
- List of largest empires
- List of administrative divisions by country
- Category:Ranked lists of country subdivisions
