= List of political and geographic subdivisions by total area from 1,000 to 3,000 square kilometers =

This is one of a series of comprehensive lists of continents, countries, and first level administrative country subdivisions such as states, provinces, and territories, as well as certain political and geographic features of substantial area. References for the information provided in this table may be found in the individual articles on each body listed herein. Some divisions are listed twice, with one listing including territory that is excluded in the other for various reasons, including territorial disputes. There is intentional overlap among the lists in order to maximize ease of use.

Geographic entity	Area (km^{2})	Notes
(Latvia) Jēkabpils district	2,998	District of Latvia.
East Flanders	2,991	Province of Flanders, Belgium.
(Province of Oristano) Oristano Province	2,990	Province of Italy.
(Croatia) Šibenik-Knin	2,984	County of Croatia.
Ida-Viru County	2,972	County of Estonia.
(Solomon Islands) Choiseul Island	2,971	Island of the Solomon Islands.
(Cambodia) Svay Rieng Province	2,966	Smallest province of Cambodia.
(Province of Pavia) Pavia Province	2,965	Province of Italy.
(Algeria) Tizi Ouzou Province	2,958	Province of Algeria.
(Groningen (province)) Groningen	2,955	Province of The Netherlands
(Guatemala) Santa Rosa	2,955	Department of Guatemala.
Kaohsiung	2,951.85	Special municipality of Taiwan.
(Sweden) Blekinge County	2,941	Smallest county of Sweden.
Saare County	2,938	County of Estonia.
Zeeland	2,933	Province of The Netherlands
(Province of Campobasso) Campobasso Province	2,925	Province of Italy.
(Lesotho) Quthing	2,916	District of Lesotho.
Adjara	2,899	Autonomous republic of Georgia.
(England) Lancashire	2,897	Administrative county of England.
(Canada) Belcher Islands	2,896	Archipelago of Canada.
(Ecuador) Tungurahua Province	2,896	Smallest province of Ecuador.
(The Gambia) Central River Division	2,895	Largest division of the Gambia.
(Albania) Gjirokastër County	2,883	County of Albania.
(Burkina Faso) Centre	2,869	Region of Burkina Faso.
(Antwerp Province) Antwerp	2,867	Province of Flanders, Belgium.
(Bulgaria) Silistra Province	2,862	Province of Bulgaria.
(Dominican Republic) Santiago	2,837	Third largest province of the Dominican Republic.
Margarita Island	2,832	Island in Colombia.
French West Indies	2,831.4	Islands in the Caribbean under French sovereignty—Guadeloupe (Basse-Terre, Grande-Terre, Les Saintes, Marie-Galante, and La Désirade), Martinique, Saint Martin and Saint Barthélemy.
Samoa	2,831	Country in Oceania.
(Bhutan) Bumthang	2,831	District of Bhutan.
(Lesotho) Leribe	2,828	District of Lesotho.
(Philippines) Benguet	2,826.59	Province of the Philippines; includes the independent city of Baguio.
(Thailand) Trat Province	2,819	Province of Thailand.
(Croatia) Istria	2,813	County of Croatia.
(Latvia) Rēzekne district	2,812	District of Latvia.
Ticino	2,812	Canton of Switzerland.
(Portugal) Aveiro	2,808	District of Portugal.
(Province of Avellino) Avellino Province	2,806	Province of Italy.
(Portugal) Lisbon	2,800	District of Portugal.
(Province of Lecce) Lecce Province	2,799	Province of Italy.
Medina	2,798	Second-level administrative province of Colombia within the department of Cundinamarca
(Marche) Macerata Province	2,779.34	Province of Italy.
(Vanuatu) Malampa Province	2,779	Second largest province of Vanuatu.
(Philippines) Bulacan	2,774.85	Province of the Philippines.
Võru County	2,773	County of Estonia.
(Serbia) Jablanica	2,769	District of Serbia.
Rapla County	2,765	County of Estonia.
(Serbia) Pirot	2,761	District of Serbia.
County Limerick	2,756	Eighth largest county of the Republic of Ireland, located in the province of Munster.
(Province of Bergamo) Bergamo Province	2,754.91	Province of Italy.
(Alaska) Revillagigedo Island	2,754.835	Island part of the U.S. state of Alaska.
(Armenia) Aragatsotn Province	2,753	Province of Armenia.
Guavio	2,753	Second-level administrative province of Colombia within the department of Cundinamarca.
(Latvia) Talsi district	2,751	District of Latvia.
(Province of Rieti) Rieti Province	2,749.16	Province of Italy.
(Philippines) Tarlac	2,736.64	Province of the Philippines.
(Bulgaria) Targovishte Province	2,735	Province of Bulgaria.
(Philippines) Antique	2,729.17	Province of the Philippines.
(Serbia) Nišava	2,729	District of Serbia.
(Brunei) Belait	2,727	District of Brunei.
(Province of Vicenza) Vicenza Province	2,722.53	Province of Italy.
(Alaska) Unalaska Island	2,720	Island part of the Aleutian Islands.
(Cyprus) (Northern Cyprus) Nicosia	2,710	District of Cyprus, partially ruled by the de facto state of Northern Cyprus.
(Albania) Vlorë County	2,706	County of Albania.
(Armenia) Tavush Province	2,704	Province of Armenia.
Tonlé Sap	2,700	Lake in Cambodia, during dry seasons of the year.
(Vietnam) Bình Dương Province	2,696.20	Province of Vietnam.
(Guatemala) Zacapa	2,690	Department of Guatemala.
(Province of Modena) Modena Province	2,688	Province of Italy.
(Armenia) Shirak Province	2,681	Province of Armenia.
Drenthe	2,680	Province of The Netherlands
(Egypt) Alexandria Governorate	2,679	Governorate of Egypt.
Järva County	2,674	County of Estonia.
(Portugal) Braga	2,673	District of Portugal.
(Estonia) Saaremaa	2,673	Island part of Estonia.
(Serbia) Rasina	2,667	District of Serbia.
(Costa Rica) Heredia Province	2,657	Smallest province of Costa Rica.
(England) Gloucestershire	2,654	Administrative county of England.
(Province of Caserta) Caserta Province	2,651	Province of Italy.
(Bulgaria) Razgrad Province	2,648	Province of Bulgaria.
(Croatia) Bjelovar-Bilogora County	2,640	County of Croatia.
(Dominican Republic) Monte Plata	2,632	Province of the Dominican Republic.
(Province of Ferrara) Ferrara Province	2,631	Province of Italy.
(Philippines) Ifugao	2,628.21	Province of the Philippines.
(Guinea-Bissau) Bolama	2,624.4	Region of Guinea-Bissau.
(England) Staffordshire	2,623	Administrative county of England.
(Liberia) Margibi	2,616	County of Liberia.
(Bulgaria) Ruse Province	2,616	Province of Bulgaria.
(Serbia) Pomoravlje	2,614	District of Serbia.
(Canada) Moresby Island	2,608	Island in the Haida Gwaii archipelago, part of Canada.
(England) Oxfordshire	2,603	Administrative county of England.
(Haiti) Sud	2,602	Department of Haiti.
(Latvia) Limbaži district	2,602	District of Latvia.
Vorarlberg	2,601	Second smallest state of Austria.
(Ukraine) Chernobyl Nuclear Power Plant Zone of Alienation	2,600	An exclusion zone established by the Soviet Union in 1986 shortly after the Chernobyl Disaster.
(Province of Chieti) Chieti Province	2,599.58	Province of Italy.
(Philippines) Ilocos Sur	2,595.96	Province of the Philippines.
James Ross Island	2,598	Island part of Antarctica.
(Philippines) Capiz	2,594.64	Province of the Philippines.
(Ghana) Greater Accra Region	2,593	Smallest region of Ghana.
(Emirate of Sharjah) Sharjah	2,590	Emirate of the United Arab Emirates.
Luxembourg	2,586	Country in Europe.
(Province of Piacenza) Piacenza Province	2,585.86	Province of Italy.
(Vietnam) Bạc Liêu Province	2,584.10	Province of Vietnam.
(Algeria) Jijel Province	2,577	Province of Algeria.
(Qatar) Al Wakrah	2,577	Second largest municipality of Qatar.
Charcot Island	2,576	Island part of Antarctica.
(Sicily) Enna Province	2,575	Province of Italy.
Saarland	2,569	Smallest non-city state of Germany.
Capital Region of Denmark	2,568.29	Smallest region of Denmark.
(Province of Pesaro and Urbino) Pesaro and Urbino	2,567.78	Province of Italy.
(Philippines) Albay	2,565.77	Province of the Philippines.
(Latvia) Aizkraukle district	2,565	District of Latvia.
(Thailand) Phrae Province	2,557	Province of Thailand.
(England) Derbyshire	2,550	Administrative county of England.
County Roscommon	2,548	County in the Republic of Ireland, third largest in the province of Connacht.
(Wales) Gwynedd	2,548	Second largest unitary authority of Wales.
(Hungary) Nógrád	2,546	Second smallest county of Hungary.
Jõgeva County	2,545	County of Estonia.
(Indonesia) Obira	2,542	Island part of Indonesia.
(England) Dorset	2,541	Administrative county of England.
(Dominican Republic) Azua	2,532	Province of the Dominican Republic.
(Latvia) Daugavpils district	2,525	District of Latvia.
Moscow	2,511	Federal subject of Russia, area after its expansion on June 1, 2012.
Réunion	2,510	Department of France.
(Guatemala) Suchitepéquez	2,510	Department of Guatemala.
(Albania) Dibër County	2,507	County of Albania.
(Latvia) Kuldīga district	2,502	District of Latvia.
County Down	2,489	Third largest county in Northern Ireland, in the province of Ulster.
(Vietnam) Tiền Giang Province	2,484.20	Province of Vietnam.
(Province of Treviso) Treviso Province	2,479.83	Province of Italy.
(Thailand) Satun Province	2,479	Province of Thailand.
(Serbia) Kolubara	2,474	District of Serbia.
(Chile) Navarino Island	2,473	Island part of Chile.
(Latvia) Ventspils district	2,472	District of Latvia.
(Russia) Paramushir	2,471	Second-largest island of the Kuril Islands, part of Russia.
(Thailand) Chachoengsao Province	2,470	Province of Thailand.
(Kosovo) Pristina	2,470	District of Kosovo.
(Metropolitan City of Venice) Venice Province	2,467	Province of Italy.
(Burundi) Bururi Province	2,465	Largest province of Burundi.
(Paraguay) Central Department	2,465	Second smallest department of Paraguay.
(Scotland) Northern Isles	2,464	Pair of archipelagoes part of Scotland, consists or Orkney and Shetland.
(Province of Trapani) Trapani Province	2,460	Province of Italy.
Ross Island	2,460	Island part of Antarctica.
(Serbia) Peć	2,459	District of Serbia.
(Croatia) Vukovar-Srijem	2,454	County of Croatia.
(Qatar) Al Rayyan	2,450	Third largest municipality of Qatar.
(Province of Pisa) Pisa Province	2,448	Province of Italy.
(Latvia) Tukums district	2,447	District of Latvia.
Saga	2,440.68	Prefecture of Japan.
(Province of Taranto) Taranto Province	2,437	Province of Italy.
(Latvia) Valka district	2,437	District of Latvia.
(Greenland) Ymer Island	2,437	Island part of Greenland.
Anvers Island	2,432	Island part of Antarctica.
(Serbia) West Bačka	2,420	District of Serbia.
Leeward Antilles	2,418	Subsection of islands in the Lesser Antilles.
(Angola) Luanda Province	2,418	Smallest province of Angola.
Kanagawa	2,415.83	Prefecture of Japan.
(England) East Riding of Yorkshire	2,415	Unitary authority of England.
(Limburg (Belgium)) Limburg	2,414	Province of Flanders, Belgium.
Zeeland	2,412	Province of The Netherlands
(Latvia) Ludza district	2,412	District of Latvia.
(Indonesia) Peleng	2,406	Island part of Indonesia.
(Malawi) Zomba	2,405	District of Malawi.
(Russia) Karaginsky Island	2,404	Island part of Russia.
(Benin) Kouffo Department	2,404	Department of Benin.
(Djibouti) Ali Sabieh Region	2,400	Region of Djibouti.
(Wales) Carmarthenshire	2,398	Third largest unitary authority of Wales.
(Portugal) Porto	2,395	District of Portugal.
(Panama) Kuna Yala	2,393	Province of Panama.
(Province of Catanzaro) Catanzaro Province	2,391	Province of Italy.
Litchfield County	2,390	County of Connecticut.
(Serbia) Šumadija	2,387	District of Serbia.
(Latvia) Balvi district	2,386	District of Latvia.
(Algeria) Aïn Témouchent Province	2,379	Province of Algeria.
(Province of Forlì-Cesena) Forlì-Cesena Province	2,378	Province of Italy.
(Bulgaria) Pernik Province	2,377	Third smallest province of Bulgaria.
(Guatemala) Chiquimula	2,376	Department of Guatemala.
(Albania) Kukës County	2,373	County of Albania.
County Wexford	2,367	County in the Republic of Ireland, largest in the province of Leinster.
(England) Northamptonshire	2,367	Administrative county of England.
(Latvia) Valmiera district	2,365	District of Latvia.
(Bhutan) Sarpang	2,362	District of Bhutan.
(Vietnam) Bến Tre Province	2,360.20	Province of Vietnam.
(Australia) Australian Capital Territory	2,358	Territory of Australia.
(Canada) Cornwall Island	2,358	Island part of the Arctic Archipelago.
(Lesotho) Qacha's Nek	2,349	District of Lesotho.
Azores	2,346	Autonomous Region of Portugal.
County Meath	2,342	County in the Republic of Ireland, second largest in the province of Leinster.
(Panama) Herrera Province	2,341	Third smallest province of Panama.
(Province of Mantua) Mantua Province	2,339	Province of Italy.
(Burundi) Ruyigi Province	2,339	Second largest province of Burundi.
(Honduras) La Paz	2,331	Department of Honduras.
(Yemen) Al Mahwit Governorate	2,330	Second smallest governorate of Yemen.
(Serbia) North Banat	2,329	District of Serbia.
(Australia) Groote Eylandt	2,326.1	Island part of Australia.
(Philippines) Camarines Norte	2,320.07	Province of the Philippines.
(Panama) Kuna de Madugandí	2,319	Second smallest province of Panama.
(Bhutan) Trashigang	2,316	District of Bhutan.
(Bhutan) Samdrup Jongkhar	2,312	District of Bhutan.
(Armenia) Vayots Dzor Province	2,308	Province of Armenia.
(Greece) Ionian Islands	2,307	Smallest periphery of Greece.
(Syria) Latakia	2,297	Governorate of Syria.
(Liberia) Maryland	2,297	Third smallest county of Liberia.
(Vietnam) Trà Vinh Province	2,295.10	Province of Vietnam.
(Province of Reggio Emilia) Reggio Emilia Province	2,291.26	Province of Italy.
Eastern Cundinamarca	2,287	Second-level administrative province of Colombia within the department of Cundinamarca
(Dominican Republic) La Vega	2,287	Province of the Dominican Republic.
(Latvia) Krāslava district	2,285	District of Latvia.
(France) Yvelines	2,284	Department of France.
Okinawa	2,281.12	Prefecture of Japan.
(Indonesia) Yapen	2,278	Island part of Indonesia.
(Province of Pordenone) Pordenone Province	2,273	Province of Italy.
(Indonesia) Morotai Island	2,266	Island part of Indonesia.
(Hungary) Komárom-Esztergom	2,265	Smallest county of Hungary.
(Brazil) Outer Caviana	2,257	Island part of Brazil.
(The Gambia) North Bank Division	2,256	Second largest division of the Gambia.
(Province of Verbano-Cusio-Ossola) Verbano-Cusio-Ossola Province	2,255	Province of Italy.
(Portugal) Viana do Castelo	2,255	District of Portugal.
(Province of Latina) Latina Province	2,251	Province of Italy.
(Canada) Princess Royal Island	2,251	Island part of Canada.
(Latvia) Alūksne district	2,243	District of Latvia.
(Scotland) Moray	2,238	Unitary district of Scotland.
(Cuba) Isla de la Juventud	2,237	Second-largest island of Cuba.
Comoros	2,235	Country in Listed figure includes Mayotte (373 km^{2}). The figure without Mayotte is 1,862 km^{2}.
(England) Durham	2,233	Administrative county of England.
(Serbia) Toplica	2,231	District of Serbia.
(Nicaragua) Estelí	2,230	Region of Nicaragua.
(Lesotho) Berea	2,222	District of Lesotho.
Taichung	2,214.89	Special municipality of Taiwan.
(Jordan) Tafilah	2,209	Governorate of Jordan.
(Norway) Hinnøya	2,204.7	Island part of Norway.
(Russia) Wilczek Land	2,203	Largest island of Franz Josef Land, part of Russia.
(Philippines) Basilan	2,217.13	Province of the Philippines.
(Norway) Vestfold	2,216	County of Norway.
(Limburg (Netherlands)) Limburg	2,210	Province of The Netherlands
(Cuba) Isla de la Juventud	2,199	Smallest province of Cuba.
(Vietnam) Hà Tây Province	2,198	Province of Vietnam.
(Serbia) Prizren	2,196	District of Serbia that is ruled by the de facto state of the Republic of Kosovo.
(Scotland) Stirling	2,196	Unitary district of Scotland.
Tainan	2,191.65	Special municipality of Taiwan.
Tokyo	2,190.93	Third smallest prefecture of Japan.
(Algeria) Constantine Province	2,187	Province of Algeria.
(Alaska) Nelson Island	2,183	Island part of the U.S. state of Alaska.
(Latvia) Saldus district	2,182	District of Latvia.
(Scotland) Angus	2,181	Unitary district of Scotland.
(Scotland) Lewis and Harris	2,178.98	Island part of Scotland.
(Algeria) Mostaganem Province	2,175	Province of Algeria.
(Haiti) Nord	2,175	Department of Haiti.
(Thailand) Nakhon Nayok Province	2,168	Province of Thailand.
(Algeria) Tipaza Province	2,166	Province of Algeria.
(Canada) Richards Island	2,165	Island in the Arctic Archipelago.
(Nicaragua) Rivas	2,162	Region of Nicaragua.
(Philippines) Mountain Province	2,157.38	Province of the Philippines.
(Malawi) Salima	2,151	District of Malawi.
(Indonesia) Trangan	2,149	Island part of Indonesia.
(Province of Padua) Padua Province	2,144.15	Province of Italy.
(Malawi) Balaka	2,142	District of Malawi.
(Turkey) Bartın Province	2,140	Province of Turkey.
(Philippines) Sulu	2,135.25	Province of the Philippines.
(El Salvador) Usulután	2,130	Largest department of El Salvador.
(Province of Caltanissetta) Caltanissetta Province	2,128	Province of Italy.
Guatemala	2,126	Department of Guatemala.
(Bhutan) Zhemgang	2,126	District of Bhutan.
(Province of Syracuse) Syracuse Province	2,124	Province of Italy.
(Province of Terni) Terni Province	2,122	Province of Italy.
(Thailand) Mukdahan Province	2,122	Province of Thailand.
(Algeria) Oran Province	2,121	Province of Algeria.
(Indonesia) Alor Island	2,120	Island part of Indonesia.
(Philippines) Sorsogon	2,119.01	Province of the Philippines.
(Lesotho) Mafeteng	2,119	District of Lesotho.
County Londonderry	2,118	County in the Ulster province of Northern Ireland.
(North Korea) P'yŏngyang-si	2,113	Special city of North Korea.
Flemish Brabant	2,106	Province of Flanders, Belgium.
(Papua New Guinea) Manus Province	2,100	Smallest province of Papua New Guinea.
(Colombia) Margarita Island	2,100	Island part of Colombia.
(Vietnam) Ho Chi Minh City (municipality)	2,098.70	Province of Vietnam.
(Armenia) Ararat Province	2,096	Third smallest province of Armenia.
(Haiti) Nord-Ouest	2,094	Department of Haiti.
(Armenia) Kotayk Province	2,089	Second smallest province of Armenia.
(Province of Vercelli) Vercelli Province	2,088	Province of Italy.
(England) Nottinghamshire	2,085	Administrative county of England.
(England) Leicestershire	2,083	Administrative county of England.
(England) Cheshire	2,081	Administrative county of England.
(Province of Benevento) Benevento Province	2,080	Province of Italy.
(Dominican Republic) Pedernales	2,078	Province of the Dominican Republic.
(El Salvador) San Miguel	2,077	Second largest department of El Salvador.
(Kosovo) Mitrovica	2,077	District of Kosovo.
(Haiti) Sud-Est	2,077	Third smallest department of Haiti.
(El Salvador) La Unión	2,074	Third largest department of El Salvador.
County Kilkenny	2,073	County in the Republic of Ireland, third largest in the province of Leinster.
Kent County	2,072	County of Delaware.
(The Gambia) Upper River Division	2,070	Division of the Gambia.
(Bhutan) Thimphu	2,067	District of Bhutan.
(Montenegro) Nikšić	2,065	Municipality of Montenegro.
(England) Worcestershire	2,065	Administrative county of England.
(Guatemala) Jalapa	2,063	Department of Guatemala.
Bir Tawil	2,060	Unclaimed land between Egypt and Sudan.
(Indonesia) Laut Island	2,057	Island part of Indonesia.
(Philippines) Misamis Occidental	2,055.22	Province of the Philippines.
(Bulgaria) Gabrovo Province	2,053	Second smallest province of Bulgaria.
(Serbia) Kosovska Mitrovica	2,053	District of Serbia that is ruled by the de facto state of the Republic of Kosovo.
New Taipei	2,052.57	Special municipality of Taiwan.
(Philippines) Pampanga	2,044.99	Province of the Philippines; includes the independent city of Angeles.
(Latvia) Preiļi district	2,041	District of Latvia.
(Vanuatu) Malakula Island	2,041	Second-largest island of Vanuatu.
Mauritius	2,040	Country in Africa. Includes Agaléga Islands, Cargados Carajos Shoals (Saint Brandon), and Rodrigues.
(Solomon Islands) New Georgia	2,037	Island part of the Solomon Islands.
(Canary Islands) Tenerife	2,034.38	Largest island of the Canary Islands, part of Spain.
(Indonesia) Misool	2,034	Island part of Indonesia.
(Georgia (country)) Guria	2,033	Smallest region of Georgia.
(Croatia) Brod-Posavina	2,030	County of Croatia.
County Wicklow	2,027	County in the Leinster province of the Republic of Ireland.
Canton of St. Gallen	2,026	Canton of Switzerland.
(Malawi) Blantyre	2,025	District of Malawi.
(Chile) Magdalena Island	2,025	Island part of Chile.
(Croatia) Virovitica-Podravina	2,024	County of Croatia.
(El Salvador) San Vicente	2,023	Department of El Salvador.
(Canada) René-Levasseur Island	2,020	Island part of Canada, world's largest artificial island.
(Equatorial Guinea) Bioko	2,017	Island part of Equatorial Guinea.
(El Salvador) Chalatenango	2,017	Department of El Salvador.
(Jamaica) Surrey County Parish	2,009.3	Parish of Jamaica.
(The Bahamas) Abaco Islands	2,009	Archipelago part of the Bahamas.
(Dominican Republic) Independencia	2,006	Province of the Dominican Republic.
(Malawi) Mulanje	2,005	District of Malawi.
Krasnoslobodsk Island	2,002	Island in the Volga.
County Offaly	2,001	County in the Leinster province of the Republic of Ireland.
(Russia) Ayon Island	2,000	Island part of Russia.
(Vietnam) Bà Rịa–Vũng Tàu province	1,989.60	Province of Vietnam.
(England) West Sussex	1,988	Administrative county of England.
(Cyprus) (Northern Cyprus) Famagusta	1,985.3	District of Cyprus, partially ruled by the de facto state of Northern Cyprus.
(Guatemala) Chimaltenango	1,979	Department of Guatemala.
(Burundi) Gitega Province	1,979	Third largest province of Burundi.
(England) Warwickshire	1,978	Administrative county of England.
(Philippines) Surigao del Norte	1,972.93	Province of the Philippines.
(Burundi) Cankuzo Province	1,965	Province of Burundi.
(Burundi) Makamba Province	1,960	Province of Burundi.
(Burundi) Rutana Province	1,959	Province of Burundi.
(Guatemala) Quetzaltenango	1,951	Department of Guatemala.
(Province of Teramo) Teramo Province	1,948	Province of Italy.
(Bhutan) Mongar	1,946	District of Bhutan.
(Malawi) Nsanje	1,945	District of Malawi.
(Liberia) Bomi	1,942	Second smallest county of Liberia.
(Egypt) Gharbia Governorate	1,942	Governorate of Egypt.
(Province of Ancona) Ancona Province	1,940	Province of Italy.
(Thailand) Pathum Thani Province	1,940	Province of Thailand.
(Alaska) Kuiu Island	1,936.16	Island part of the U.S. state of alaska.
County Cavan	1,932	County in the Ulster province of the Republic of Ireland.
(Dominican Republic) Monte Cristi	1,924	Province of the Dominican Republic.
(Guatemala) El Progreso	1,922	Department of Guatemala.
Valga County	1,917	County of Estonia.
United States Virgin Islands	1,910	Territory of the United States.
(Liberia) Montserrado	1,909	Smallest county of Liberia.
Osaka	1,905.14	Second smallest prefecture of Japan.
(Indonesia) Biak	1,904	Island part of Indonesia.
Hartford County	1,900	County in Connecticut.
(Indonesia) Bacan	1,899.8	Island part of Indonesia.
(Syria) Tartus	1,896	Third smallest governorate of Syria.
Lower Magdalena	1,894	Second-level administrative province of Colombia within the department of Cundinamarca
(Albania) Fier County	1,887	County of Albania.
(Slovakia) Žitný ostrov	1,886	Island part of Slovakia.
(Hawaii) Maui	1,883	Second-largest island of the U.S. state of Hawaii.
(Latvia) Bauska district	1,882	District of Latvia.
(Timor-Leste) Viqueque	1,880.4	Municipality of East Timor.
(Latvia) Gulbene district	1,877	District of Latvia.
(Kagawa Prefecture) Kagawa	1,876.72	Smallest prefecture of Japan.
(Syria) Quneitra	1,861	Second smallest governorate of Syria.
Mauritius (main island)	1,860	Main island of Mauritius.
(Province of Ravenna) Ravenna Province	1,858	Province of Italy.
(England) Herefordshire	1,858	Unitary authority of England.
County Waterford	1,858	County in the Munster province of the Republic of Ireland.
(Guatemala) Retalhuleu	1,856	Department of Guatemala.
(Dominican Republic) Puerto Plata	1,853	Province of the Dominican Republic.
(Egypt) Qena Governorate	1,851	Governorate of Egypt.
(South Korea) Jeju Special Self-Governing Province	1,846	Province of South Korea.
(Colombia) Quindío Department	1,845	District of Colombia.
Kokang	1,844.1	Self-administered zone in Myanmar.
(China) Ninghai	1,843	County in Zhejiang province.
(Afghanistan) Kapisa Province	1,842	Smallest province of Afghanistan.
(Australia) Fraser Island	1,840	Island part of Australia (world's largest sand island).
(Latvia) Ogre district	1,840	Third smallest district of Latvia.
County Westmeath	1,840	County in the Leinster province of the Republic of Ireland.
(Metropolitan City of Genoa) Genoa Province	1,839	Province of Italy.
(Province of Brindisi) Brindisi Province	1,839	Province of Italy.
County Sligo	1,838	County in the Connacht province of the Republic of Ireland.
(Burundi) Muyinga Province	1,836	Province of Burundi.
(Egypt) Faiyum Governorate	1,827	Governorate of Egypt.
(South Korea) Jeju Island	1,826	Island part of South Korea.
(Philippines) Laguna	1,823.55	Province of the Philippines.
(Croatia) Požega-Slavonia	1,823	County of Croatia.
Põlva County	1,823	Third smallest county of Estonia.
(Philippines) Aklan	1,821.42	Province of the Philippines.
Lääne County	1,816	Second smallest county of Estonia.
(New Zealand) Stewart Island	1,815	Island part of New Zealand.
(Timor-Leste) Lautém	1,813.1	Municipality of East Timor.
(Alaska) Afognak	1,812.58	Island part of the U.S. state of Alaska.
(Russia) Bely Island	1,810	Island part of Russia.
(Bhutan) Trongsa	1,807	District of Bhutan.
(France) Essonne	1,804	Department of France.
(Albania) Berat County	1,802	County of Albania.
(Djibouti) Arta Region	1,800	Second smallest region of Djibouti.
(Oman) Musandam Governorate	1,800	Smallest governorate of Oman.
New Zealand outlying islands	1,800	Nine island groups part of New Zealand, but located outside of the New Zealand continental shelf.
(Philippines) Southern Leyte	1,797.22	Province of the Philippines.
(Wales) Ceredigion	1,797	Unitary authority of Wales.
(Bhutan) Chukha	1,791	District of Bhutan.
(Province of Rovigo) Rovigo Province	1,789	Province of Italy.
(Dominican Republic) El Seibo	1,787	Province of the Dominican Republic.
(Timor-Leste) Manatuto	1,786	Municipality of East Timor.
(Serbia) North Bačka	1,784	District of Serbia.
(Croatia) Dubrovnik-Neretva	1,781	County of Croatia.
(Botswana) South-East District	1,780	Smallest district of Botswana.
(Alaska) Umnak	1,776.76	Island part of the U.S. state of Alaska.
(Province of Lucca) Lucca Province	1,773	Province of Italy.
(Scotland) South Lanarkshire	1,771	Unitary district of Scotland.
(Province of Cremona) Cremona Province	1,770	Province of Italy.
(Lesotho) Butha-Buthe	1,767	District of Lesotho.
(Russia) Bolshoy Shantar Island	1,766	Island part of Russia.
(Russia) Bolshoy Begichev Island	1,764	Island part of Russia.
(The Gambia) Western Division	1,764	Second smallest division of the Gambia.
(Indonesia) Simeulue	1,754	Island part of Indonesia.
(Croatia) Koprivnica-Križevci	1,748	County of Croatia.
(New Zealand) Stewart Island/Rakiura	1,746	Third largest island in New Zealand.
(Bhutan) Haa	1,746	District of Bhutan.
(Dominican Republic) Barahona	1,739	Province of the Dominican Republic.
(Canton of Zurich) Canton of Zürich	1,729	Canton of Switzerland.
(Indonesia) Kobroor	1,723	Island part of Indonesia.
(Canada) Air Force Island	1,720	Island part of the Arctic Archipelago.
County Laois	1,720	County in the Leinster province of the Republic of Ireland.
New London County	1,720	County of Connecticut.
(Indonesia) Natuna Besar	1,720	Island part of Indonesia.
(Province of Crotone) Crotone Province	1,717	Province of Italy.
(Greenland) Geographical Society Island	1,717	Island part of Greenland.
(England) East Sussex	1,713	Administrative county of England.
(Malawi) Ntchisi	1,709	District of Malawi.
(Nicaragua) Madriz	1,708	Region of Nicaragua.
(Burundi) Kirundo Province	1,703	Province of Burundi.
(United Kingdom) Fermanagh	1,700	Largest district of Northern Ireland.
(Haiti) Nord-Est	1,698	Second smallest department of Haiti.
County Kildare	1,695	County in the Leinster province of the Republic of Ireland.
(Samoa) Savai'i	1,694	Largest island of Samoa.
(Australia) Bathurst Island	1,692	Island part of Australia.
County Fermanagh	1,691	County in Northern Ireland in the province of Ulster.
(Emirate of Ras Al Khaimah) Ras al-Khaimah	1,684	Emirate of the United Arab Emirates.
(Honduras) Ocotepeque	1,680	Third smallest department of Honduras.
Canton of Fribourg	1,671	Canton of Switzerland.
(England) Surrey	1,670	Administrative county of England.
(Malawi) Thyolo	1,666	District of Malawi.
(Tanzania) Unguja	1,666	Island part of Tanzania.
(Russia) Bering Island	1,660	Island part of Russia.
(Canary Islands) Fuerteventura	1,660	Second-largest island of the Canary Islands.
(Scotland) Skye	1,656.25	Island part of Scotland.
(El Salvador) La Libertad	1,653	Department of El Salvador.
(Vietnam) Hải Dương Province	1,652.80	Province of Vietnam.
(Vietnam) Nam Định Province	1,650.80	Province of Vietnam.
Malacca	1,650	State of Malaysia.
(Bhutan) Trashiyangste	1,643	District of Bhutan.
(England) Hertfordshire	1,638	Administrative authority (county) of England.
(Burundi) Cibitoke Province	1,636	Province of Burundi.
(Finland) Soisalo	1,635	Island part of Finland.
(Latvia) Dobele district	1,633	Second smallest district of Latvia.
(Greece) Lesbos	1,632.8	Island part of Greece.
(Albania) Tirana County	1,631	Third smallest county of Albania.
(Vanuatu) Tafea Province	1,628	Province of Vanuatu.
Guadeloupe	1,628	French overseas département includes La Désirade, Marie Galante, Les Saintes, Saint-Barthélemy and Saint Martin (French part). Note that Saint-Barthélemy and Saint Martin became separate overseas collectivities in 2007 and are no longer politically part of Guadeloupe.
(Sicily) Ragusa Province	1,623.89	Province of Italy.
(Indonesia) Salawati	1,623	Island part of Indonesia.
Fairfield County	1,620	County of Connecticut.
(The Gambia) Lower River Division	1,618	Smallest division of the Gambia.
(Morocco) Grand Casablanca	1,615	Smallest region of Morocco.
(Qatar) Al Khor	1,613	Municipality of Qatar.
(Russia) Kunashir Island	1,612	Third-largest island of the Kuril Islands, part of Russia.
Joinville Island	1,607	Island part of Antarctica.
(Dominican Republic) Duarte	1,605	Province of the Dominican Republic.
(Benin) Mono Department	1,605	Department of Benin.
(Latvia) Jelgava district	1,604	Smallest district of Latvia.
(Indonesia) Tanahbesar	1,604	Island part of Indonesia.
(Vietnam) Hậu Giang Province	1,601.10	Province of Vietnam.
Kauai County	1,600	County of Hawaii.
(Indonesia) Rantau	1,597	Island part of Indonesia.
(Algeria) Boumerdès Province	1,591	Province of Algeria.
(Wales) Pembrokeshire	1,590	Unitary authority of Wales.
County Leitrim	1,588	County in the Connacht province of the Republic of Ireland.
(Colombia) Bogotá (Distrito Capital)	1,587	Capital district of Colombia; second smallest district of Colombia.
(Norway) Senja	1,586.3	Island part of Norway.
(Canada) Flaherty Island	1,585	Island in the Arctic Archipelago.
(Bhutan) Samtse	1,585	District of Bhutan.
(England) Greater London	1,583	Region of England.
(Hawaii) Oahu	1,583	Third-largest island of the U.S. state Hawaii.
(Romania) Ilfov County	1,583	Smallest county of Romania.
Åland	1,582.93	Autonomous region of Finland.
Petseri County	1,582	Former county of Estonia (1920–1944). Currently annexed by Russia.
(Metropolitan City of Milan) Milan Province	1,575	Province of Italy.
(Jordan) Irbid	1,572	Governorate of Jordan.
New Haven County	1,570	County of Connecticut.
(England) Buckinghamshire	1,569	Administrative county of England.
(Thailand) Ayutthaya Province	1,569	Province of Thailand.
(Honduras) Valle	1,565	Second smallest department of Honduras.
(Malawi) Neno	1,561	District of Malawi.
(Canary Islands) Gran Canaria	1,560.1	Third-largest island of the Canary Islands, part of Spain.
(Utrecht (province)) Utrecht	1,560	Province of The Netherlands
Honolulu County	1,560	County of Hawaii.
(Russia) Graham Bell Island	1,557	Second-largest island of Franz Josef Land, part of Russia.
(Egypt) Sohag Governorate	1,547	Governorate of Egypt.
(Vietnam) Thái Bình Province	1,546.50	Province of Vietnam.
Cahul District	1,546	Largest district of Moldova.
(Province of Savona) Savona Province	1,545	Province of Italy.
(The Bahamas) Great Inagua	1,544	Second-largest island of the Bahamas.
(Apulia) Barletta-Andria-Trani Province	1,543	Province of Italy.
(Brazil) Mexiana	1,543	Island part of Brazil.
(Canada) Eglinton Island	1,541	Island in the Arctic Archipelago.
(India) Middle Andaman Island	1,536	Largest island of the Andaman and Nicobar Islands, part of India.
(Province of Isernia) Isernia Province	1,535.24	Province of Italy.
(Greenland) Clavering Island	1,535	Island part of Greenland.
(Philippines) Romblon	1,533.45	Province of the Philippines.
(Egypt) Monufia Governorate	1,532	Governorate of Egypt.
(Russia) Pioneer Island	1,527	Island in Severnaya Zemlya, part of Russia.
(Thailand) Nonthaburi Province	1,526	Province of Thailand.
(Indonesia) Great Karimun	1,524	Island part of Indonesia.
(Philippines) Catanduanes	1,523	Island part of the Philippines.
(Vietnam) Hai Phong (municipality)	1,520.70	Province of Vietnam.
(Philippines) Cavite	1,512.41	Province of the Philippines.
Hatiya Island	1,508.23	Island in Bangladesh.
(Timor-Leste) Baucau	1,508	Municipality of East Timor.
(Province of Asti) Asti Province	1,504	Province of Italy.
(Philippines) La Union	1,503.75	Province of the Philippines.
Vargas	1,496	State of Venezuela.
Canton of Lucerne	1,493	Canton of Switzerland.
(Philippines) Catanduanes	1,492.16	Province of the Philippines.
(Iran) Qeshm	1,491	Island part of Iran.
(Indonesia) Rupat	1,490	Island part of Indonesia.
Hîncești District	1,484	Second largest district of Moldova.
(India) Delhi	1,483	Union Territory of India.
Letea Island	1,480	Island in Romania.
(Vietnam) Vĩnh Long Province	1,479.10	Province of Vietnam.
Distrito Federal	1,479	District of Mexico.
(Algeria) Blida Province	1,478	Province of Algeria.
(Burundi) Ngozi Province	1,474	Province of Burundi.
(Greenland) Nares Land	1,466	Island part of Greenland.
(Greenland) Shannon Island	1,466	Island part of Greenland.
(Scotland) Shetland	1,466	Archipelago part of Scotland.
(Burundi) Karuzi Province	1,457	Province of Burundi.
(Hawaii) Kauai	1,456.4	Island part of the U.S. state of Hawaii.
(Vanuatu) Shefa Province	1,455	Province of Vanuatu.
Camargue	1,453	Island in France.
(The Bahamas) South Andros Island	1,448	Third-largest island of the Bahamas.
(El Salvador) Morazán	1,447	Department of El Salvador.
(Egypt) Ismailia Governorate	1,442	Governorate of Egypt.
(Bangladesh) Bhola Island	1,441	Island part of Bangladesh.
(Montenegro) Podgorica	1,441	Municipality and capital of Montenegro.
(Algeria) Annaba Province	1,439	Province of Algeria.
Saint Petersburg	1,439	Smallest federal subject of Russia after June 1, 2012.
(Scotland) Shetland Islands	1,438	Island area of Scotland.
(Papua New Guinea) Fergusson Island	1,437	Island part of Papua New Guinea.
(Russia) Urup	1,436	Island part of Russia.
(Dominican Republic) Elías Piña	1,426	Province of the Dominican Republic.
(Japan) Okinawa Islands	1,418.59	Island group part of Japan.
(Brazil) São Luís Island	1,410	Island part of Brazil.
(Greece) Rhodes	1,400.684	Island part of Greece.
Aargau	1,404	Canton of Switzerland.
(Vietnam) Cần Thơ (municipality)	1,401.60	Province of Vietnam.
Faroe Islands	1,399	Self-governing territory of Denmark.
(Tanzania) Dar es Salaam	1,398	Region of Tanzania.
(Kosovo) Prizren	1,397	District of Kosovo.
(Cyprus) Limassol	1,393.3	District of Cyprus.
(Vietnam) Ninh Bình Province	1,392.40	Province of Vietnam.
(Cyprus) Paphos	1,389.8	District of Cyprus.
(Serbia) Kosovo-Pomoravlje	1,389	District of Serbia that is ruled by the de facto state of the Republic of Kosovo.
(Bhutan) Dagana	1,387	District of Bhutan.
King George Island	1,384	Largest island of the South Shetland Islands.
(Timor-Leste) Bobonaro	1,380.8	Municipality of East Timor.
(Canada) Graham Island	1,378	Island in the Arctic Archipelago.
(Fiji) Eastern	1,376	A division of Fiji.
(Canada) Pitt Island	1,375	Island part of Canada.
(Vietnam) Vĩnh Phúc Province	1,373.20	Province of Vietnam.
(The Bahamas) Grand Bahama	1,373	Island part of the Bahamas.
(Philippines) Bataan	1,372.98	Province of the Philippines.
(Canada) Nottingham Island	1,372	Island in the Arctic Archipelago.
(Australia) Flinders Island	1,367	Island part of Australia.
(Kosovo) Peja	1,365	District of Kosovo.
(Chile) Desolación Island	1,352	Island part of Chile.
(Myanmar) Ramree Island	1,350	Island part of Myanmar.
(Bulgaria) Sofia	1,349	Smallest province of Bulgaria.
(Montenegro) Pljevlja	1,346	Municipality of Montenegro.
(Sweden) Öland	1,342	Second smallest province of Sweden.
(Province of Novara) Novara Province	1,339	Province of Italy.
(Turkey) Kilis Province	1,338	Province of Turkey.
Windham County	1,330	County of Connecticut.
(Dominican Republic) Hato Mayor	1,329	Province of the Dominican Republic.
County Armagh	1,327	County in the Ulster province of Northern Ireland.
(Timor-Leste) Manufahi	1,326.6	Municipality of East Timor.
(Scotland) Fife	1,323	Unitary district of Scotland.
(Malawi) Phalombe	1,323	District of Malawi.
(Egypt) Beni Suef Governorate	1,322	Governorate of Egypt.
(Bhutan) Paro	1,310	District of Bhutan.
(North Korea) Kaesŏng-si	1,309	Special city of North Korea.
(Alaska) Bristol Bay Borough	1,308	Smallest borough of Alaska.
(Canada) Lougheed Island	1,308	Island part of the Arctic Archipelago.
(Brunei) Temburong	1,306	District of Brunei.
(Dominican Republic) Santo Domingo (Capital Province)	1,302	Province of the Dominican Republic.
(Eritrea) Central region	1,300	Region of Eritrea.
(Ulster) County Monaghan	1,295	County in the Ulster province of the Republic of Ireland.
Gualivá	1,293	Second-level administrative province of Colombia within the department of Cundinamarca
(Chile) Dawson Island	1,290	Island part of Chile.
(Norway) Barentsøya	1,288	Island part of Svalbard, Norway.
(Metropolitan City of Rome Capital) Rome	1,285	Largest municipality of the EU and Italy.
(Chad) N'Djamena	1,284	Region of Chad.
(Dominican Republic) Baoruco	1,282	Province of the Dominican Republic.
(Benin) Ouémé Department	1,281	Second smallest department of Benin.
(Province of Como) Como Province	1,279	Province of Italy.
New Castle County	1,279	County of Delaware.
(Dominican Republic) María Trinidad Sánchez	1,272	Province of the Dominican Republic.
(Indonesia) Lembata	1,270	Island part of Indonesia.
Chongming Island	1,267	Island in Shanghai.
(Dominican Republic) San Cristóbal	1,266	Province of the Dominican Republic.
(Philippines) Basilan	1,266	Island part of the Philippines.
(Croatia) Varaždin	1,262	County of Croatia.
Almeidas	1,259	Second-level administrative province of Colombia within the department of Cundinamarca
Mill Island	1,258	Island part of Antarctica.
(Vietnam) Da Nang (municipality)	1,257.30	Province of Vietnam.
(Dominican Republic) San Pedro de Macorís	1,255.46	Province of the Dominican Republic.
(Indonesia) Mangole Island	1,255.33	Island part of Indonesia.
(Scotland) East Ayrshire	1,252	Unitary district of Scotland.
(Senegal) Morfil	1,250	Island part of Senegal.
(Metropolitan City of Cagliari) Cagliari Province	1,248	Province of Italy.
(Serbia) Podunavlje	1,248	District of Serbia.
(France) Val-d'Oise	1,246	Department of France.
(Denmark) Lolland	1,243	Island part of Denmark.
(Armenia) Armavir Province	1,242	Smallest province of Armenia.
(Israel) Central District	1,242	Third largest District of Israel.
(Equatorial Guinea) Bioko Sur	1,241	Province of Equatorial Guinea.
(El Salvador) Ahuachapán	1,240	Department of El Salvador.
(Burundi) Kayanza Province	1,233	Province of Burundi.
(Province of Pescara) Pescara Province	1,230	Province of Italy.
(China) Chongming Island	1,229	Island part of China.
(Croatia) Krapina-Zagorje	1,229	Third smallest county of Croatia.
(Province of Ascoli Piceno) Ascoli Piceno Province	1,228	Province of Italy.
Orhei District	1,228	District of Moldova
(Papua New Guinea) New Hanover Island	1,227	Island part of Papua New Guinea.
(Indonesia) Rote Island	1,227	Island part of Indonesia.
(El Salvador) Sonsonate	1,225	Department of El Salvador.
(El Salvador) La Paz	1,224	Department of El Salvador.
Taoyuan	1,220.95	Special municipality of Taiwan.
(Province of Livorno) Livorno Province	1,218	Province of Italy.
(Ethiopia) Dire Dawa	1,213	Chartered city region of Ethiopia.
New York City	1,212.6	City in the U.S. State of New York.
(Jamaica) Saint Ann Parish	1,212.6	Largest parish of Jamaica.
(Jamaica) Saint Elizabeth Parish	1,212.4	Second largest parish of Jamaica.
(India) South Andaman Island	1,211	Second-largest island of the Andaman and Nicobar Islands, part of India.
(Haiti) Nippes	1,210	Smallest department of Haiti (estimated, accurate current figures not available).
(Japan) Okinawa Island	1,206.98	Island part of Japan.
(Timor-Leste) Cova Lima	1,206.7	Municipality of East Timor.
(Kosovo) Gjilan	1,206	District of Kosovo.
(Scotland) South Ayrshire	1,202	Unitary district of Scotland.
Serranilla Bank	1,200	Disputed island in the Caribbean claimed by the United States, Nicaragua and Honduras, and administered by Colombia.
(Province of Varese) Varese Province	1,198.11	Province of Italy.
(Vanuatu) Penama Province	1,198	Second smallest province of Vanuatu.
(Jamaica) Clarendon Parish	1,196.3	Third largest parish of Jamaica.
(Dominican Republic) Sánchez Ramírez	1,196	Province of the Dominican Republic.
(French Polynesia) Windward Islands	1,195	Largest administrative subdivision of French Polynesia.
(North Macedonia) Prilep	1,194	Municipality of North Macedonia.
(England) Bedfordshire	1,193	Administrative county of England.
(Jamaica) Saint Catherine Parish	1,192.4	Parish of Jamaica.
Upper Magdalena	1,190	Second-level administrative province of Colombia within the department of Cundinamarca
(El Salvador) Santa Ana	1,184	Department of El Salvador.
(Philippines) Rizal	1,175.76	Province of the Philippines.
(Metropolitan City of Naples) Naples Province	1,171	Province of Italy.
(Alaska) Municipality of Skagway	1,171	Municipality of Alaska.
(Brunei) Tutong	1,166	District of Brunei.
(Emirate of Fujairah) Fujairah	1,165	Emirate of the United Arab Emirates.
Tequendama	1,164	Second-level administrative province of Colombia within the department of Cundinamarca
Căușeni District	1,163	Third largest district of Moldova.
(Luxembourg) Diekirch	1,157	Largest district of Luxembourg.
(Province of Massa-Carrara) Massa-Carrara Province	1,157	Province of Italy.
(Province of Imperia) Imperia Province	1,154	Province of Italy.
Nueva Esparta	1,150	State of Venezuela.
(The Bahamas) Great Abaco	1,146	Third-largest island of the Bahamas.
(Province of Vibo Valentia) Vibo Valentia Province	1,139	Province of Italy.
(Wales) Conwy	1,130	Unitary authority of Wales.
(Kosovo) Gjakova	1,129	District of Kosovo.
Martinique	1,128	French overseas département.
(Samoa) Upolu	1,125	Second-largest island of Samoa.
(United Kingdom) Omagh	1,124	Second largest district of Northern Ireland.
(Cyprus) (Northern Cyprus) Larnaca	1,120.1	District of Cyprus, partially ruled by the de facto state of Northern Cyprus.
(Jordan) Balqa	1,120	Governorate of Jordan.
(Dominican Republic) Santiago Rodríguez	1,111	Province of the Dominican Republic.
Florești District	1,108	District of Moldova.
(El Salvador) Cabañas	1,104	Third smallest department of El Salvador.
Hong Kong	1,104	Special administrative regions of the People's Republic of China.
Tolland County	1,100	County of Connecticut.
Providence County	1,100	County of Rhode Island.
(Russia) Alexandra Land	1,095	Third-largest island of Franz Josef Land, part of Russia.
Walloon Brabant	1,093	Province of Wallonia, Belgium.
Central Magdalena	1,091	Second-level administrative province of Colombia within the department of Cundinamarca
County Longford	1,091	County in the Leinster province of the Republic of Ireland.
Moscow	1,091	Smallest federal subject of Russia before its expansion on June 1, 2012.
(Burundi) Bubanza Province	1,089	Province of Burundi.
(Burundi) Bujumbura Rural Province	1,089	Province of Burundi.
Ungheni District	1,083	District of Moldova.
(Nicaragua) Carazo	1,081	Third smallest region of Nicaragua.
(Ukraine) Sevastopol	1,079	Independent city, first-level subdivision of Ukraine.
Canton of Uri	1,077	Canton of Switzerland.
Fălești District	1,073	District of Moldova.
(Iceland) Capital Region	1,062	Second smallest region of Iceland.
(Guatemala) Sololá	1,061	Second smallest department of Guatemala (tie).
(Guatemala) Totonicapán	1,061	Second smallest department of Guatemala (tie).
(Palestine) Hebron	1,060	Governorate of Palestine.
(South Korea) Ulsan	1,056	Largest metropolitan city of South Korea.
Zhongshan	1,055.42	City in Guangdong.
(French Polynesia) Marquesas Islands	1,049.3	Second largest administrative subdivision of French Polynesia.
Penang	1,046	State of Malaysia.
(French Polynesia) Tahiti	1,044	Largest island of French Polynesia.
Soroca District	1,043	District of Moldova.
(Nicaragua) Granada	1,040	Second smallest region of Nicaragua.
(Philippines) Dinagat Islands	1,036.34	Province of the Philippines.
Suffolk	1,033.82	Independent City of Virginia.
Sîngerei District	1,033	District of Moldova.
Atarashiki	1,030	A village community in Miyazaki, Japan.
(Kosovo) Ferizaj	1,030	District of Kosovo.
Grande Comore	1,025	Largest autonomous island in the Comoros.
Hiiu County	1,032	Smallest county of Estonia.
(Dominican Republic) Dajabón	1,021	Province of the Dominican Republic.
(Turkey) Düzce Province	1,014	Province of Turkey.
(Thailand) Samut Prakan Province	1,004	Province of Thailand.
(Egypt) Qalyubia Governorate	1,001	Governorate of Egypt.
Drochia District	1,000	District of Moldova.
(Mauritania) Nouakchott	1,000	Smallest region of Mauritania.

== See also ==
Other divisions

- 0.1 to 1,000,000+ square kilometers
- 1,000,000+ square kilometers

Smaller divisions

- 200,000+ square kilometers • 100,000 to 1,000,000 square kilometers • 50,000 to 200,000 square kilometers • 20,000 to 50,000 square kilometers
- 5,000 to 20,000 square kilometers • 1,000 to 5,000 square kilometers • 0.1 to 1,000 square kilometers
- 500,000 to 1,000,000 square kilometers • 200,000 to 500,000 square kilometers • 100,000 to 200,000 square kilometers
- 50,000 to 100,000 square kilometers • 30,000 to 50,000 square kilometers • 20,000 to 30,000 square kilometers • 10,000 to 20,000 square kilometers
- 7,000 to 10,000 square kilometers • 5,000 to 7,000 square kilometers • 3,000 to 5,000 square kilometers • 1,000 to 3,000 square kilometers
- 250 to 1,000 square kilometers • 50 to 250 square kilometers • Under 50 square kilometers

Other

- List of countries and dependencies by area
- List of largest empires
- List of administrative divisions by country
- Category:Ranked lists of country subdivisions
