= List of political and geographic subdivisions by total area from 5,000 to 7,000 square kilometers =

This is one of a series of comprehensive lists of continents, countries, and first level administrative country subdivisions such as states, provinces, and territories, as well as certain political and geographic features of substantial area. References for the information provided in this table may be found in the individual articles on each body listed herein. Some divisions are listed twice, with one listing including territory that is excluded in the other for various reasons, including territorial disputes. There is intentional overlap among the lists in order to maximize ease of use.

Geographic entity	Area (km^{2})	Notes
(Canada) Cornwallis Island	6,995	Island in the Arctic Archipelago.
(Vienne (department)) Vienne	6,990	Department of France.
Uppsala County	6,989	County of Sweden.
(Chumphon province) Chumphon Province	6,947	Province of Thailand.
(Finland) Päijät-Häme	6,941.71	Region of Finland.
(Turkey) Giresun Province	6,934	Province of Turkey.
(Scotland) Argyll and Bute	6,930	Second largest unitary district of Scotland.
Alpes-de-Haute-Provence	6,925	Department of France.
(Jordan) Aqaba	6,905	Governorate of Jordan.
(Province of Cuneo) Cuneo Province	6,902	Province of Italy.
(Vietnam) Yên Bái Province	6,899.50	Province of Vietnam.
(Turkey) Burdur Province	6,887	Province of Turkey.
(Vietnam) Bình Phước Province	6,883.40	Province of Vietnam.
Côtes-d'Armor	6,878	Department of France.
(Finland) South Karelia	6,872.13	Region of Finland.
Charente-Maritime	6,864	Department of France.
(Romania) Argeș County	6,862	County of Romania.
(Metropolitan City of Turin) Turin Province	6,827	Province of Italy.
Cumbria	6,824	Second largest administrative county of England.
Morbihan	6,823	Department of France.
Nièvre	6,817	Department of France.
Loire-Atlantique	6,815	Department of France.
(Nicaragua) Matagalpa	6,804	Region of Nicaragua.
(Uzbekistan) Fergana Region	6,800	Region of Uzbekistan.
Vysočina Region	6,795.56	Region of the Czech Republic.
Indre	6,791	Department of France.
Akwa Ibom State	6,788	State of Nigeria.
(Georgia (country)) Mtskheta-Mtianeti	6,786	Third largest region of Georgia.
Loiret	6,775	Department of France.
Ille-et-Vilaine	6,775	Department of France.
(Algeria) Saida Province	6,764	Province of Algeria.
(Portugal) Santarém	6,747	District of Portugal.
(Cuba) Sancti Spíritus Province	6,737	Province of Cuba.
Finistère	6,733	Department of France.
(Uthai Thani province) Uthai Thani Province	6,730	Province of Thailand.
(Malawi) Mangochi	6,729	District of Malawi.
(Vietnam) Cao Bằng Province	6,724.60	Province of Vietnam.
Vendée	6,720	Department of France.
(Kazakhstan) Baikonur Cosmodrome	6717	Spaceport operated by the Russian Federation within Kazakhstan.
(Romania) Mureș County	6,714	County of Romania.
(Province of Cosenza) Cosenza Province	6,710	Province of Italy.
Shimane	6,708.24	Prefecture of Japan.
(Turkey) Bitlis Province	6,707	Province of Turkey.
(Cambodia) Banteay Meanchey Province	6,679	Province of Cambodia.
(Alaska) Prince of Wales Island	6,675	Island part of the U.S. state of Alaska.
(Portugal) Castelo Branco	6,675	District of Portugal.
(Romania) Cluj County	6,674	County of Romania.
(Panama) Ngöbe-Buglé Comarca	6,673	Province of Panama.
Pas-de-Calais	6,671	Department of France.
Davao del Sur	6,667.06	Province of the Philippines; includes the independent city of Davao.
(Equatorial Guinea) Litoral	6,665	Province of Equatorial Guinea.
Negeri Sembilan	6,645	State of Malaysia.
(Romania) Harghita County	6,639	County of Romania.
(Romania) Bacău County	6,621	County of Romania.
(Portugal) Bragança	6,608	District of Portugal.
(Senegal) Thiès Region	6,601	Region of Senegal.
(Sukhothai province) Sukhothai Province	6,596	Province of Thailand.
(Province of Potenza) Potenza Province	6,594	Province of Italy.
(Turkey) Gümüşhane Province	6,575	Province of Turkey.
(Turkey) Kırşehir Province	6,570	Province of Turkey.
Devon	6,561	Third largest administrative county of England.
(Turkey) Kırklareli Province	6,550	Province of Turkey.
(Phitsanulok province) Phitsanulok Province	6,539	Province of Thailand.
Drôme	6,530	Department of France.
South Sardinia	6,530	Province of Italy.
Smallwood Reservoir	6,527	Lake in Canada.
(Vietnam) Đắk Nông Province	6,516.90	Province of Vietnam.
(Leyte (province)) Leyte	6,515.05	Province of the Philippines; includes the independent cities of Ormoc and Tacloban.
(Algeria) Sétif Province	6,504	Province of Algeria.
Stockholm County	6,488	County of Sweden.
(Nicaragua) Chontales	6,481	Region of Nicaragua.
(Bulgaria) Blagoevgrad Province	6,478	Third largest province of Bulgaria.
Chiriquí Province	6,477	Province of Panama.
(Georgia (country)) Imereti	6,448	Region of Georgia.
Delaware	6,447	State of the United States.
(Scotland) Dumfries and Galloway	6,439	Third largest unitary district of Scotland.
(Afghanistan) Paktia Province	6,432	Province of Afghanistan.
(Georgia (country)) Samtskhe-Javakheti	6,412	Region of Georgia.
Tochigi	6,408.09	Prefecture of Japan.
Lake Turkana	6,405	Lake in Kenya.
(Pest County) Pest	6,393	Third largest county of Hungary.
Siple Island	6,390	Island part of Antarctica.
(Vietnam) Lào Cai Province	6,383.90	Province of Vietnam.
(Cuba) Las Tunas Province	6,373	Province of Cuba.
(Prachuap Khiri Khan province) Prachuap Khiri Khan Province	6,368	Province of Thailand.
(Cuba) Guantánamo Province	6,366	Province of Cuba.
Gunma	6,362.28	Prefecture of Japan.
(Canada) Graham Island	6,361	Island in the Haidwa Gwaii archipelago, part of Canada.
(Fiji) Western	6,360	A division of Fiji.
(Vietnam) Kiên Giang Province	6,348.30	Province of Vietnam.
Santiago de Cuba Province	6,343	Province of Cuba.
Loir-et-Cher	6,343	Department of France.
Ebonyi State	6,342	State of Nigeria.
(China) Shanghai	6,341	Largest city of China by Population.
Ōita	6,340.71	Prefecture of Japan.
(Chaiyaphum province) Chaiyaphum Province	6,338	Province of Thailand.
(Phatthalung province) Phatthalung Province	6,335	Province of Thailand.
(Province of Perugia) Perugia Province	6,334	Province of Italy.
Reindeer Lake	6,330	Lake in Canada.
(Aberdeenshire (historic)) Aberdeenshire	6,318	Unitary district of Scotland.
Haute-Garonne	6,309	Department of France.
(Romania) Maramureș County	6,304	County of Romania.
Västmanland County	6,302	County of Sweden.
(Uzbekistan) Xorazm Region	6,300	Region of Uzbekistan.
Seine-Maritime	6,278	Department of France.
(Turkey) Edirne Province	6,276	Province of Turkey.
Gers	6,257	Department of France.
(Los Ríos Province) Los Ríos	6,254	Province of Ecuador.
(Georgia (country)) Samegrelo-Zemo Svaneti	6,242	Region of Georgia.
(Romania) Alba County	6,242	County of Romania.
(Phetchabun province) Phetchabun Province	6,225	Province of Thailand.
(Turkey) Tekirdağ Province	6,218	Province of Turkey.
(Moselle (department)) Moselle	6,216	Department of France.
Lake Eyre	6,216	Lake in South Australia.
Trentino	6,212	Province of Italy. Autonomous province.
(Malawi) Lilongwe	6,211	District of Malawi.
(Meuse (department)) Meuse	6,211	Department of France.
Haute-Marne	6,211	Department of France.
(Hajdú-Bihar County) Hajdú-Bihar	6,211	County of Hungary.
(Turkey) Gaziantep Province	6,207	Province of Turkey.
Sarthe	6,206	Department of France.
Jackson Purchase	6,202	Eight Kentucky counties purchased from the Chickasaw Indians.
(Russia) New Siberia	6,201	Island part of the New Siberian Islands archipelago, part of Russia.
Lake Issyk-Kul	6,200	Lake in Kyrgyzstan.
Loei Province	6,200	Province of Thailand.
(Fiji) Northern	6,198	A division of Fiji.
(Laos) Bokeo	6,196	Second smallest province of Laos.
(Somme (department)) Somme	6,170	Department of France.
(Cambodia) Oddar Meancheay Province	6,158	Province of Cambodia.
County Galway	6,151	Second largest county in the Republic of Ireland, largest county in the province of Connacht.
(Serbia) Zlatibor	6,140	District of Serbia.
Aude	6,139	Department of France.
Indre-et-Loire	6,127	Department of France.
Yamaguchi	6,112.30	Prefecture of Japan.
Chimbu Province	6,112	Province of Papua New Guinea.
Everglades National Park	6,110	Park in the U.S. state of Florida.
Colonia Department	6,106	Department of Uruguay.
Orne	6,103	Department of France.
(Romania) Buzău County	6,103	County of Romania.
Hérault	6,101	Department of France.
(Togo) Maritime	6,100	Smallest region of Togo.
(Vietnam) Quảng Ninh Province	6,099.00	Province of Vietnam.
Ibaraki	6,097.06	Prefecture of Japan.
(Syria) Idlib	6,097	Governorate of Syria.
(Portugal) Portalegre	6,065	District of Portugal.
Södermanland County	6,061	County of Sweden.
Auckland	6,059	Second smallest region of New Zealand.
(Samar (province)) Samar	6,048.03	Province of the Philippines.
Eure	6,040	Department of France.
(Vietnam) Bình Định Province	6,039.60	Province of Vietnam.
(Somogy County) Somogy	6,036	County of Hungary.
Savoie	6,028	Department of France.
(Vietnam) Hà Tĩnh Province	6,026.50	Province of Vietnam.
Palestine	6,020	Territory in the Middle East; figure consists of the West Bank and Gaza Strip.
(Indonesia) Mentawai Islands Regency	6,011.35	Chain of islands part of Indonesia.
(Chonburi province) Chon Buri Province	6,009	Province of Thailand.
Aube	6,004	Department of France.
(Turkey) Ordu Province	6,001	Province of Turkey.
Lake Urmia	6,001	Lake in Iran.
Dongting Lake	6,000	Lake in China.
Deux-Sèvres	5,999	Department of France.
El Oro Province	5,988	Province of Ecuador.
(Guinea-Bissau) Bafatá	5,981.1	Region of Guinea-Bissau.
(Afghanistan) Parwan Province	5,974	Province of Afghanistan.
(Bulgaria) Plovdiv Province	5,973	Province of Bulgaria.
(Var (department)) Var	5,973	Department of France.
(Rwanda) Southern Province	5,963	Province of Rwanda.
(Cuba) Ciego de Ávila Province	5,962	Province of Cuba.
Canton of Bern	5,959	Second largest canton of Switzerland.
(The Bahamas) Andros Island	5,957	Archipelago of the Bahamas.
Charente	5,956	Department of France.
(Algeria) Mascara Province	5,941	Province of Algeria.
Manche	5,938	Department of France.
(Szabolcs-Szatmár-Bereg County) Szabolcs-Szatmár-Bereg	5,936	County of Hungary.
Lincolnshire	5,921	Administrative county of England.
Seine-et-Marne	5,915	Department of France.
Zamboanga del Sur	5,914.16	Province of the Philippines; includes the independent city of Zamboanga.
(Vietnam) Đồng Nai Province	5,903.90	Province of Vietnam.
(Romania) Neamț County	5,896	County of Romania.
(Rwanda) Western Province	5,883	Province of Rwanda.
Eure-et-Loir	5,880	Department of France.
(Vosges (department)) Vosges	5,874	Department of France.
(Vietnam) Tuyên Quang Province	5,870.40	Province of Vietnam.
Occidental Mindoro	5,865.71	Province of the Philippines.
(Turkey) Sinop Province	5,862	Province of Turkey.
Oise	5,860	Department of France.
Corrèze	5,857	Department of France.
Gard	5,853	Department of France.
(Eswatini) Lubombo	5,849.11	Region of Eswatini.
Distrito Federal	5,802	State of Brazil.
Ekiti State	5,797	State of Nigeria.
(Romania) Teleorman County	5,790	County of Romania.
Mie	5,774.40	Prefecture of Japan.
Brunei	5,765	Country in Country in Southeast Asia.
(Australia) Melville Island	5,765	Island part of Australia.
(Romania) Vâlcea County	5,765	County of Romania.
(United States) Bolivar Republic	5,762	Micronation State lying on the Mississippi River. It Covers the Mississippi Counties of Bolivar, Coahoma, Tallahatchie, Sunflower, Leflore, and Washington, as well covering the Arkansas counties of Desha and Philips
Ain	5,762	Department of France.
(Tarn (department)) Tarn	5,758	Department of France.
Friesland	5,753	Province of the Netherlands.
Nueva Ecija	5,751.33	Province of the Philippines.
Nord	5,743	Department of France.
Cantal	5,726	Department of France.
(Finland) Kanta-Häme	5,707.63	Region of Finland.
Lake Torrens	5,698	Lake in South Australia.
Ehime	5,676.11	Prefecture of Japan.
Central	5,674	Province of Sri Lanka.
Davao Oriental	5,670.07	Province of the Philippines.
Havana Province	5,669	Province of Cuba.
Prince Edward Island	5,660	Province of Canada.
(Palestine) West Bank	5,655	Bigger one of the two territories of Palestine.
(Province of Nuoro) Nuoro Province	5,638	Province of Italy.
Chimborazo Province	5,637	Province of Ecuador.
Bali	5,633	Province of Indonesia.
(Békés County) Békés	5,631	County of Hungary.
(Romania) Gorj County	5,602	County of Romania.
Rivercess	5,594	County of Liberia.
County Mayo	5,588	Third largest county in the Republic of Ireland, second largest county in the province of Connacht.
(Fiji) Vanua Levu	5,587	Second-largest island of Fiji.
(Jász-Nagykun-Szolnok County) Jász-Nagykun-Szolnok	5,582	County of Hungary.
(Turkey) Ardahan Province	5,576	Province of Turkey.
Creuse	5,565	Department of France.
(Chile) Wellington Island	5,556	Island part of Chile.
(Syria) As-Suwayda	5,550	Governorate of Syria.
Hautes-Alpes	5,549	Department of France.
(Calvados (department)) Calvados	5,548	Department of France.
Vänern	5,545	Lake in Sweden.
Southern	5,544	Province of Sri Lanka.
(Govisümber Province) Govisümber	5,540	Third smallest aimag of Mongolia.
Ardèche	5,529	Department of France.
(Cambodia) Kampong Chhnang Province	5,521	Province of Cambodia.
(Turkey) Amasya Province	5,520	Province of Turkey.
Haute-Vienne	5,520	Department of France.
(Portugal) Guarda	5,518	District of Portugal.
(Nakhon Pathom province) Nakhon Pathom Province	5,513	Province of Thailand.
Nakhchivan	5,502	Republic of Azerbaijan.
(Canada) Coats Island	5,498	Island part of the Arctic Archipelago.
(Romania) Olt County	5,498	County of Romania.
(Equatorial Guinea) Wele-Nzas	5,478	Province of Equatorial Guinea.
(Romania) Iași County	5,476	County of Romania.
(Solomon Islands) Western Province	5,475	Largest province of the Solomon Islands.
Aguascalientes	5,471	State of Mexico.
(Turkey) Nevşehir Province	5,467	Province of Turkey.
Camarines Sur	5,465.26	Province of the Philippines; includes the independent city of Naga.
Halland County	5,454	Third smallest county of Sweden.
Pangasinan	5,451.08	Province of the Philippines; includes the independent city of Dagupan.
(Romania) Sibiu County	5,432	County of Romania.
Moravian-Silesian Region	5,426.83	Region of the Czech Republic.
Alytus County	5,425	County of Lithuania.
Liguria	5,421	Third smallest region of Italy.
Pärnu County	5,419	Largest county of Estonia.
(United States) Uinta County	5,410	County in Wyoming
(Turkey) Siirt Province	5,406	Province of Turkey.
(Guinea-Bissau) Oio	5,403.4	Region of Guinea-Bissau.
(Turkey) Hatay Province	5,403	Province of Turkey.
Lake Winnipegosis	5,403	Lake in Canada.
(Alaska) Chichagof Island	5,388	Island part of the U.S. state of Alaska.
Negros Oriental	5,385.53	Province of the Philippines.
Norfolk	5,372	Administrative county of England.
(Metropolitan City of Rome Capital) Rome Province	5,364	Province of Italy.
(Romania) Brașov County	5,363	County of Romania.
Lot-et-Garonne	5,361	Department of France.
Haute-Saône	5,360	Department of France.
(Suphan Buri province) Suphanburi Province	5,358	Province of Thailand.
(Romania) Bistrița-Năsăud County	5,355	County of Romania.
(Solomon Islands) Guadalcanal	5,353	Largest island of the Solomon Islands.
(Lika-Senj County) Lika-Senj	5,353	Largest county of Croatia.
(Thailand) Buriram	5,351	Province of Thailand.
(Yemen) Ibb Governorate	5,350	Governorate of Yemen.
(Armenia) Gegharkunik Province	5,348	Largest province of Armenia.
(Turkey) Uşak Province	5,341	Province of Turkey.
(Guadalcanal Province) Guadalcanal	5,336	Second largest province of the Solomon Islands.
Ústí nad Labem Region	5,334.52	Region of the Czech Republic.
(Vietnam) Cà Mau Province	5,331.70	Province of Vietnam.
Cebu	5,331.07	Province of the Philippines; includes the independent cities of Cebu, Lapu-Lapu and Mandaue.
Cantabria	5,321	Third smallest autonomous community of Spain.
(Romania) Vaslui County	5,318	County of Romania.
(Scotland) Perth and Kinross	5,311	Unitary district of Scotland.
Lake Albert	5,299	Lake in Africa between Uganda and Zaire.
(Mae Hong Son province) Mae Hong Son Province	5,292	Province of Thailand.
Cotopaxi Province	5,287	Province of Ecuador.
(Greece) South Aegean	5,286	Periphery of Greece.
Olomouc Region	5,266.57	Region of the Czech Republic.
(Canada) Amund Ringnes Island	5,255	Island part of the Arctic Archipelago.
Sultan Kudarat	5,251.34	Province of the Philippines.
Meurthe-et-Moselle	5,246	Department of France.
(Benin) Zou Department	5,243	Department of Benin.
Doubs	5,234	Department of France.
(Ardennes (department)) Ardennes	5,229	Department of France.
Valais	5,224	Third largest canton of Switzerland.
(Turkey) Istanbul Province	5,220	Province of Turkey.
(Finland) Central Ostrobothnia	5,219.58	Region of Finland.
(Vietnam) Khánh Hòa Province	5,217.60	Province of Vietnam.
(Lot (department)) Lot	5,217	Department of France.
Klaipėda County	5,209	County of Lithuania.
(Wales) Powys	5,204	Largest unitary authority of Wales.
(Ratchaburi province) Ratchaburi Province	5,197	Province of Thailand.
(Honduras) Comayagua	5,196	Department of Honduras.
Colima	5,191	State of Mexico.
Mayenne	5,175	Department of France.
(Guinea-Bissau) Cacheu	5,174.9	Region of Guinea-Bissau.
Aichi	5,172.48	Prefecture of Japan.
Lozère	5,167	Department of France.
Grand Cape Mount	5,162	County of Liberia.
Chiba	5,157.65	Prefecture of Japan.
(Russia) Bolshoy Lyakhovsky Island	5,157	Island in the New Siberian Islands archipelago, part of Russia.
(Vietnam) Quảng Ngãi Province	5,152.70	Province of Vietnam.
Flores Department	5,144	Department of Uruguay.
(León, Spain) León	5,138	Region of Nicaragua.
Gelderland	5,136	Province of the Netherlands.
Imo State	5,135	State of Nigeria.
(Alaska) St. Lawrence Island	5,135	Island part of the U.S. state of Alaska.
Trinidad and Tobago	5,130	Country in the Caribbean.
(Georgia (country)) Kvemo Kartli	5,122	Region of Georgia.
(Kuwait) Ahmadi	5,120	Governorate of Kuwait.
Lake Mweru	5,120	Lake in Africa between Democratic Republic of the Congo and Zambia.
(Botswana) North-East District	5,120	Second smallest district of Botswana.
(Honduras) Santa Bárbara	5,115	Department of Honduras.
River Gee	5,113	County of Liberia.
(Chile) Riesco Island	5,100	Island part of Chile.
(Uzbekistan) Sirdaryo Region	5,100	Third smallest region of Uzbekistan.
(Romania) Călărași County	5,088	County of Romania.
Bouches-du-Rhône	5,087	Department of France.
North Brabant	5,082	Province of the Netherlands.
(Svalbard) Edgeøya	5,073	Third-largest island of Svalbard, Norway.
Nettilling Lake	5,066	Lake in Canada; largest lake entirely on an island.
(Vietnam) Thừa Thiên–Huế Province	5,065.30	Province of Vietnam.
(Portugal) Setúbal	5,064	District of Portugal.
(Vietnam) Phú Yên Province	5,060.60	Province of Vietnam.
(Canada) Mackenzie King Island	5,048	Island part of the Arctic Archipelago.
(Province of L'Aquila) L'Aquila Province	5,047	Province of Italy.
La Rioja	5,045	Second smallest autonomous community of Spain.
(Albania) Korçë County	5,044	Largest county of Albania.
(Jamaica) Middlesex County	5,041.9	County of Jamaica.
Northumberland	5,026	Administrative county of England.
(Metropolitan City of Palermo) Palermo Province	5,009.28	Province of Italy.
(Trinidad and Tobago) Trinidad	5,009	Largest of the two main islands of Trinidad and Tobago.
(Portugal) Viseu	5,007	District of Portugal.

== See also ==
Other divisions

- 0.1 to 1,000,000+ square kilometers
- 1,000,000+ square kilometers

Smaller divisions

- 200,000+ square kilometers • 100,000 to 1,000,000 square kilometers • 50,000 to 200,000 square kilometers • 20,000 to 50,000 square kilometers
- 5,000 to 20,000 square kilometers • 1,000 to 5,000 square kilometers • 0.1 to 1,000 square kilometers
- 500,000 to 1,000,000 square kilometers • 200,000 to 500,000 square kilometers • 100,000 to 200,000 square kilometers
- 50,000 to 100,000 square kilometers • 30,000 to 50,000 square kilometers • 20,000 to 30,000 square kilometers • 10,000 to 20,000 square kilometers
- 7,000 to 10,000 square kilometers • 5,000 to 7,000 square kilometers • 3,000 to 5,000 square kilometers • 1,000 to 3,000 square kilometers
- 250 to 1,000 square kilometers • 50 to 250 square kilometers • Under 50 square kilometers

Other

- List of countries and dependencies by area
- List of largest empires
- List of administrative divisions by country
- Category:Ranked lists of country subdivisions
