= List of political and geographic subdivisions by total area from 20,000 to 30,000 square kilometers =

This is one of a series of comprehensive lists of continents, countries, and first level administrative country subdivisions such as states, provinces, and territories, as well as certain political and geographic features of substantial area. References for the information provided in this table may be found in the individual articles on each body listed herein. Some divisions are listed twice, with one listing including territory that is excluded in the other for various reasons, including territorial disputes. There is intentional overlap among the lists in order to maximize ease of use.

| Geographic entity | Area (km^{2}) | Notes |
|---|---|---|
| Central Province (Papua New Guinea) | 29,998 | Province of Papua New Guinea. |
| (Algeria) Naâma Province | 29,950 | Province of Algeria. |
| Normandy | 29,907 | Region of France. |
| Kaluga Oblast | 29,900 | Federal subject of Russia. |
| (Russia) New Siberian Islands | 29,900 | Archipelago part of Russia. |
| Greater Poland Voivodeship (Wielkopolskie) | 29,854 | Second largest Voivodeship of Poland. |
| Zhytomyr Oblast | 29,832 | Oblast of Ukraine. |
| Misiones | 29,801 | Province of Argentina. |
| Kursk Oblast | 29,800 | Federal subject of Russia. |
| Armenia | 29,800 | Country in the Caucasus region of Europe. |
| Galicia | 29,574 | Autonomous community of Spain. |
| Brandenburg | 29,480 | State of Germany. |
| Cauca Department | 29,308 | District of Colombia. |
| (Senegal) Louga Region | 29,188 | Second largest region of Senegal. |
| (Iran) Kurdistan Province | 29,137 | Province of Iran. |
| (Iran) Markazi Province | 29,130 | Province of Iran. |
| Pastaza Province | 29,068 | Largest province of Ecuador. |
| (Nigeria) Kogi State | 29,063 | State of Nigeria. |
| Vladimir Oblast | 29,000 | Federal subject of Russia. |
| Mogilev Region (Mahilyow Region) | 29,000 | Second smallest province of Belarus. |
| Osh Region | 28,934 | Region of Kyrgyzstan. |
| Monagas | 28,930 | State of Venezuela. |
| Great Slave Lake | 28,930 | Lake in Canada. |
| Solomon Islands | 28,896 | Country in Oceania. |
| Madang Province | 28,886 | Province of Papua New Guinea. |
| (Guinea) Kindia Region | 28,873 | Third smallest region of Guinea. |
| Poltava Oblast | 28,748 | Oblast of Ukraine. |
| Albania | 28,748 | Country in Europe. |
| Kayin State | 28,726 | State of Myanmar (Myanmar has certain administrative divisions titled as Divisions, and others titled as States). |
| (Tajikistan) Region of Republican Subordination | 28,600 | Second largest province of Tajikistan. |
| (Ivory Coast) Vallée du Bandama District | 28,518 | District of Côte d'Ivoire. |
| (Ivory Coast) Lacs District | 25,800 | District of Côte d'Ivoire. |
| (Turkey) Sivas Province | 28,488 | Second largest province of Turkey. |
| (Botswana) Southern | 28,470 | District of Botswana. |
| Kherson Oblast | 28,461 | Oblast of Ukraine. |
| (Iran) North Khorasan Province | 28,434 | Province of Iran. |
| Timor | 28,418 | Island divided between Indonesia and East Timor. |
| (Uzbekistan) Qashqadaryo Region | 28,400 | Region of Uzbekistan. |
| (Zimbabwe) Mashonaland Central | 28,374 | Smallest province of Zimbabwe. |
| Hawaii | 28,311 | State of the United States. |
| (Iran) Lorestan Province | 28,294 | Province of Iran. |
| Dalarna County | 28,194 | County of Sweden. |
| Kyiv Oblast | 28,131 | Oblast of Ukraine. |
| Equatorial Guinea | 28,051 | Country in Africa. |
| (Chad) Logone Oriental | 28,035 | Region of Chad. |
| (Nepal) Karnali Province | 27,984 | Province of Nepal. |
| Burundi | 27,834 | Country in Africa. |
| (Eritrea) Northern Red Sea region | 27,800 | Region in Eritrea. |
| Alagoas | 27,768 | State of Brazil. |
| Haiti | 27,750 | Country in the Caribbean. |
| (Eritrea) Southern Red Sea region | 27,600 | Region in Eritrea. |
| North Sinai Governorate | 27,574 | Governorate of Egypt. |
| Hedmark | 27,388 | County of Norway. |
| Massachusetts | 27,336 | State of the United States. |
| South Caribbean Coast Autonomous Region | 27,260 | Second largest region of Nicaragua. |
| Federally Administered Tribal Areas | 27,220 | Province of Pakistan. |
| Brittany | 27,208 | Region of France. |
| (Republic of the Congo) Cuvette-Ouest | 27,200 | Department of the Republic of the Congo. Area is approximate, as sources conflict. |
| Zaporizhia Oblast | 27,180 | Oblast of Ukraine. |
| Belgorod Oblast | 27,100 | Federal subject of Russia. |
| (Nigeria) Oyo State | 27,036 | State of Nigeria. |
| Nayarit | 26,979 | State of Mexico. |
| (Tanzania) Tanga | 26,808 | Region of Tanzania. |
| Luhansk Oblast | 26,684 | Oblast of Ukraine. |
| (Nigeria) Nasarawa State | 26,633 | State of Nigeria. |
| (Central African Republic) Nana-Mambéré | 26,600 | Prefecture of the Central African Republic. |
| (Namibia) Omusati | 26,573 | Region of Namibia. |
| (Jordan) Mafraq | 26,551 | Governorate of Jordan. |
| (Nigeria) Plateau State | 26,539 | State of Nigeria. |
| Donetsk Oblast | 26,517 | Oblast of Ukraine. |
| Vinnitsa Oblast | 26,513 | Oblast of Ukraine. |
| Rwanda | 26,338 | Country in Africa. |
| (Benin) Alibori Department | 26,242 | Largest department of Benin. |
| Republic of Mordovia | 26,200 | Federal subject of Russia. |
| Bosnia and Herzegovina | 26,111 | Political entity of Bosnia and Herzegovina. |
| (Autonomous Republic of Crimea) Crimea | 26,081 | Autonomous republic of Ukraine. |
| Bolívar, Colombia | 25,978 | District of Colombia. |
| (Republic of the Congo) Niari | 25,940 | Department of the Republic of the Congo. |
| Asyut Governorate | 25,926 | Governorate of Egypt. |
| (Nepal) Koshi | 25,905 | Province of Nepal. |
| (Benin) Borgou Department | 25,856 | Second largest department of Benin. |
| Troms | 25,848 | County of Norway. |
| Gambela Region | 25,802 | Region of Ethiopia. |
| (Ivory Coast) Bas-Sassandra | 25,800 | District of Côte d'Ivoire. |
| (Scotland) Highland | 25,784 | Largest unitary district of Scotland; largest sub-country entity of the United Kingdom. |
| (Mozambique) Maputo Province | 25,756 | Smallest non-city province of Mozambique. |
| Lake Erie | 25,719 | Lake in North America, between Canada and the United States. |
| North Macedonia | 25,713 | Country in Europe. |
| Kingdom of Sicily | 25,708 | A medieval kingdom centered on the Island of Sicily, lasting from 1282-1811/1816. |
| Sicily | 25,708 | Largest region of Italy. |
| (Turkey) Ankara Province | 25,706 | Third largest province of Turkey. |
| Tula Oblast | 25,700 | Federal subject of Russia. |
| (New Zealand) Waikato | 25,598 | Region of New Zealand. |
| (La Libertad Department (El Salvador)) La Libertad Region | 25,500 | Region of Peru. |
| (Tajikistan) Sughd | 25,400 | Province of Tajikistan. |
| Piedmont | 25,399 | Second largest region of Italy. |
| (Gabon) Ogooué-Lolo | 25,380 | Province of Gabon. |
| (Burkina Faso) Hauts-Bassins | 25,343 | Region of Burkina Faso. |
| (Department of Pasco) Pasco Region | 25,320 | Region of Peru. |
| Tabasco | 25,267 | State of Mexico. |
| Oppland | 25,191 | County of Norway. |
| Lublin Voivodeship (Lubelskie) | 25,115 | Third largest Voivodeship of Poland. |
| Taiwan Province | 25,110 | Largest province of Taiwan. |
| (Senegal) Matam Region | 25,083 | Third largest region of Senegal. |
| (Turkey) Erzurum Province | 25,066 | Province of Turkey. |
| (Algeria) Laghouat Province | 25,057 | Province of Algeria. |
| Córdoba Department | 25,020 | District of Colombia. |
| Grodno Region (Hrodna Region) | 25,000 | Smallest province of Belarus. |
| (Iran) Kermanshah Province | 24,998 | Province of Iran. |
| Vermont | 24,901 | State of the United States. |
| Putumayo Department | 24,885 | District of Colombia. |
| Falcón | 24,800 | State of Venezuela. |
| (Tajikistan) Khatlon | 24,800 | Smallest province of Tajikistan. |
| (Canada) Somerset Island | 24,786 | Island in the Arctic Archipelago. |
| Oryol Oblast | 24,700 | Federal subject of Russia. |
| Munster | 24,608 | A historical province of Ireland occupying the southern quarter of the island. |
| Mykolaiv Oblast | 24,598 | Oblast of Ukraine. |
| Kirovohrad Oblast | 24,588 | Oblast of Ukraine. |
| (Cameroon) Southwest Province | 24,571 | Province of Cameroon. |
| Republika Srpska | 24,526 | Political entity of Bosnia and Herzegovina. |
| Ulster | 24,481 | A historical province of Ireland occupying the northern quarter of the island (all but three counties correspond to Northern Ireland). |
| (Ghana) Ashanti Region | 24,390 | Third largest region of Ghana. |
| Southern Region (Iceland) | 24,256 | Largest region of Iceland. |
| (Honduras) Olancho | 24,351 | Largest department of Honduras. |
| New Hampshire | 24,216 | State of the United States. |
| Cundinamarca Department | 24,210 | District of Colombia. |
| (Warmian–Masurian Voivodeship) Warmian-Masurian Voivodeship (Warmińsko-Mazurskie) | 24,204 | Voivodeship of Poland. |
| (Angola) Cuanza Norte Province | 24,190 | Province of Angola. |
| (Morocco) Taza-Al Hoceima-Taounate | 24,155 | Region of Morocco. |
| Lipetsk Oblast | 24,100 | Federal subject of Russia. |
| Sardinia | 24,090 | Third largest region of Italy. |
| (Russia) Kotelny Island | 24,000 | Island in the New Siberian Islands, part of Russia. |
| (Sweden) Västra Götaland County | 23,945 | County of Sweden. |
| (Ivory Coast) Sassandra-Marahoué District | 23,280 | District of Côte d'Ivoire. |
| (Ghana) Western Region | 23,921 | Region of Ghana. |
| (Ecuador) Morona-Santiago | 23,875 | Second largest province of Ecuador. |
| Lombardy | 23,861 | Region of Italy. |
| Sumy Oblast | 23,834 | Oblast of Ukraine. |
| (Nigeria) Katsina State | 23,822 | State of Nigeria. |
| Arauca Department | 23,818 | District of Colombia. |
| (Iran) Mazandaran Province | 23,701 | Province of Iran. |
| Tolima Department | 23,562 | District of Colombia. |
| Lake Winnipeg | 23,553 | Lake in Canada. |
| (Nigeria) Jigawa State | 23,415 | State of Nigeria. |
| (Sudan) Gezira | 23,373 | State of Sudan. |
| (Syria) Al-Hasakah | 23,334 | Third largest governorate of Syria. |
| (Ivory Coast) Lagunes District | 23,280 | District of Côte d'Ivoire. |
| (New Zealand) West Coast | 23,276 | Region of New Zealand. |
| Valencian Community | 23,255 | Autonomous community of Spain. |
| (Eritrea) Anseba region | 23,200 | Region in Eritrea. |
| Mari El Republic | 23,200 | Federal subject of Russia. |
| Djibouti | 23,200 | Country in Africa. |
| Boyacá Department | 23,189 | District of Colombia. |
| Magdalena Department | 23,188 | District of Colombia. |
| Mecklenburg-Vorpommern | 23,174 | State of Germany. |
| Tuscany | 22,997 | Region of Italy. |
| Belize | 22,966 | Country in Central America. |
| Central Equatoria | 22,956 | State of South Sudan. |
| (Afghanistan) Ghazni Province | 22,915 | Province of Afghanistan. |
| Cesar Department | 22,905 | District of Colombia. |
| West Pomeranian Voivodeship (Zachodniopomorskie) | 22,902 | Voivodeship of Poland. |
| (Gabon) Ogooué-Maritime | 22,890 | Province of Gabon. |
| (Guinea) Labé Region | 22,869 | Second smallest region of Guinea. |
| (Iran) Bushehr Province | 22,743 | Province of Iran. |
| Oro Province | 22,735 | Province of Papua New Guinea. |
| Eastern Region (Iceland) | 22,721 | Second largest region of Iceland. |
| (Afghanistan) Orūzgān Province | 22,696 | Province of Afghanistan. |
| Kingdom of Navarre | 22,670 | A Spanish Kingdom during the reconquista, lasting from 824–1620. |
| New Jersey | 22,588 | State of the United States. |
| Tucumán | 22,524 | Province of Argentina. |
| Meghalaya | 22,429 | State of India. |
| (Norway) Nord-Trøndelag | 22,396 | County of Norway. |
| Manipur | 22,327 | State of India. |
| (Chad) Lac | 22,320 | Region of Chad. |
| (Mauritania) Dakhlet Nouadhibou | 22,300 | Region of Mauritania. |
| (Nepal) Lumbini Province | 22,288 | Province of Nepal. |
| (Iceland) Westfjords | 22,271 | Third largest region of Iceland. |
| (New Zealand) Manawatū-Whanganui | 22,206 | Region of New Zealand. |
| (Bangladesh) Khulna Division | 22,181 | Division of Bangladesh. |
| Israel (including disputed territory) | 22,145 | Country in Middle East. Including the Golan Heights; excluding the West Bank and Gaza Strip. |
| (Sudan) Khartoum | 22,142 | Smallest state of Sudan. |
| (Valle del Cauca Department) Valle del Cauca | 22,140 | District of Colombia. |
| Huancavelica Region | 22,131 | Region of Peru. |
| Emilia-Romagna | 22,124 | Region of Italy. |
| (Nigeria) Cross River State | 22,112 | State of Nigeria. |
| Kepulauan Riau | 21,992 | Province of Indonesia. |
| Northeastern Region (Iceland) | 21,968 | Region of Iceland. |
| Sergipe | 21,910 | State of Brazil. |
| (Zambia) Lusaka Province | 21,898 | Smallest province of Zambia; split from Central Province in 1973, Lusaka province was initially only 360 km^{2}, but by 1988 it had been enlarged to its present size. |
| Lviv Oblast | 21,831 | Oblast of Ukraine. |
| Ivanovo Oblast | 21,800 | Federal subject of Russia. |
| (Laos) Savannakhet | 21,774 | Largest province of Laos. |
| (Iran) Zanjan Province | 21,773 | Province of Iran. |
| (Burkina Faso) Centre-Ouest | 21,752 | Region of Burkina Faso. |
| Västernorrland County | 21,678 | County of Sweden. |
| (Orellana Province) Orellana | 21,691 | Third largest province of Ecuador. |
| Norte de Santander Department | 21,658 | District of Colombia. |
| (Nepal) Gandaki | 21,504 | Province of Nepal. |
| Vojvodina | 21,506 | Province of Serbia. |
| México | 21,355 | State of Mexico. |
| Ica Region | 21,328 | Region of Peru. |
| (Gabon) Nyanga Province | 21,285 | Third smallest province of Gabon. |
| Tierra del Fuego | 21,263 | Province of Argentina. Not including claims on the Malvinas (Falkland Islands), South Georgia and South Sandwich Islands, nor Argentine Antarctica. |
| Bengkulu | 21,168 | Province of Indonesia. |
| (Afghanistan) Baghlan Province | 21,118 | Province of Afghanistan. |
| Hesse (Hessen) | 21,115 | State of Germany. |
| Mizoram | 21,081 | State of India. |
| El Salvador | 21,041 | Country in Central America. |
| Perak | 21,006 | State of Malaysia. |
| (Ivory Coast) Denguélé District | 20,997 | District of Côte d'Ivoire. |
| (Algeria) Biskra Province | 20,986 | Province of Algeria. |
| (Republic of the Congo) Lékoumou | 20,950 | Department of the Republic of the Congo. |
| Guayas Province | 20,902 | Province of Ecuador. |
| Cherkasy Oblast | 20,900 | Oblast of Ukraine. |
| (Peru) Apurímac Region | 20,896 | Region of Peru. |
| (La Guajira Department) Guajira Department | 20,848 | District of Colombia. |
| Hidalgo | 20,813 | State of Mexico. |
| (Uzbekistan) Surxondaryo Region | 20,800 | Region of Uzbekistan. |
| Wales | 20,779 | Second smallest constituent country of the United Kingdom. |
| Israel (excluding disputed territory) | 20,770 | Country in Middle East. Excluding the Golan Heights, the West Bank and Gaza Strip. |
| (Gabon) Estuaire Province | 20,740 | Second smallest province of Gabon. |
| (Algeria) Tiaret Province | 20,673 | Province of Algeria. |
| Khmelnytskyi Oblast | 20,645 | Oblast of Ukraine. |
| (Turkey) Antalya Province | 20,591 | Province of Turkey. |
| (Afghanistan) Badghis Province | 20,591 | Province of Afghanistan. |
| Halaib Triangle | 20,580 | Disputed area between Egypt and Sudan. |
| (Ghana) Volta Region | 20,572 | Region of Ghana. |
| (Uzbekistan) Jizzax Region | 20,500 | Region of Uzbekistan. |
| (Benin) Atakora Department | 20,499 | Department of Benin. |
| (Thailand) Nakhon Ratchasima Province | 20,494 | Largest province of Thailand. |
| Saxony-Anhalt (Sachsen-Anhalt) | 20,445 | State of Germany. |
| (Nigeria) Kano State | 20,389 | State of Nigeria. |
| West New Britain Province | 20,387 | Province of Papua New Guinea. |
| (Nepal) Bagmati | 20,300 | Province of Nepal. |
| (Afghanistan) Faryab Province | 20,293 | Province of Afghanistan. |
| Slovenia | 20,273 | Country in Europe. |
| (Cameroon) Littoral Province | 20,239 | Third smallest province of Cameroon. |
| (Iran) Golestan Province | 20,195 | Province of Iran. |
| Podlaskie Voivodeship (Podlaskie) | 20,171 | Voivodeship of Poland. |
| Volyn Oblast | 20,144 | Oblast of Ukraine. |
| (Iran) Ilam Province | 20,133 | Province of Iran. |
| (Chanthaburi province) Chanthaburi Province | 20,107 | Second largest province of Thailand. |
| Rivne Oblast | 20,047 | Oblast of Ukraine. |
| (San Pedro Department, Paraguay) San Pedro Department | 20,002 | Department of Paraguay. |
| (Brazil) Bananal Island | 20,000 | Island part of Brazil, world's second-largest fluvial island. |

== See also ==
Other divisions

- 0.1 to 1,000,000+ square kilometers
- 1,000,000+ square kilometers

Smaller divisions

- 200,000+ square kilometers • 100,000 to 1,000,000 square kilometers • 50,000 to 200,000 square kilometers • 20,000 to 50,000 square kilometers
- 5,000 to 20,000 square kilometers • 1,000 to 5,000 square kilometers • 0.1 to 1,000 square kilometers
- 500,000 to 1,000,000 square kilometers • 200,000 to 500,000 square kilometers • 100,000 to 200,000 square kilometers
- 50,000 to 100,000 square kilometers • 30,000 to 50,000 square kilometers • 20,000 to 30,000 square kilometers • 10,000 to 20,000 square kilometers
- 7,000 to 10,000 square kilometers • 5,000 to 7,000 square kilometers • 3,000 to 5,000 square kilometers • 1,000 to 3,000 square kilometers
- 250 to 1,000 square kilometers • 50 to 250 square kilometers • Under 50 square kilometers

Other

- List of countries and dependencies by area
- List of largest empires
- List of administrative divisions by country
- Category:Ranked lists of country subdivisions
