= Cirilo Guainora =

- Corregimiento
- Location within Panama
- Country: Panama
- Comarca: Emberá
- District: Cémaco
- Established: November 8, 1983

Area
  - Land: 434.8 km^{2} (167.9 sq mi)

Population (2010)
  - Total: 2,197
  - Density: 5.1/km^{2} (13/sq mi)
- Population density calculated based on land area.
- Time zone: UTC−5 (EST)

Cirilo Guainora is a corregimiento in Cémaco District, Comarca Emberá, Panama with a population of 8,703 as of 2010. It is the seat of Cémaco District. It was created by Law 22 of November 8, 1983. Its population as of 1990 was 1,428; its population as of 2000 was 2,015.
