= List of political and geographic subdivisions by total area from 100,000 to 1,000,000 square kilometers =

This is one of a series of comprehensive lists of continents, countries, and first level administrative country subdivisions such as states, provinces, and territories, as well as certain political and geographic features of substantial area. References for the information provided in this table may be found in the individual articles on each body listed herein. Some divisions are listed twice, with one listing including territory that is excluded in the other for various reasons, including territorial disputes. There is intentional overlap among the lists in order to maximize ease of use.

Geographic entity	Area (km^{2})	Notes
(Russia) West Siberian economic region	992,000	Economic Region of Russia.
(Nunavut) Qikiqtaaluk Region	989,879.35	Largest second-level administrative division in the world.
South Australia	983,482	State of Australia.
Egypt	980,869	Country in Africa; excluding the Halaib Triangle.
Sea of Japan	978,000	Body of water between the Korean Peninsula to the west, Russia to the north, and Japan to the east.
Northeast Greenland National Park	972,000	Largest administrative division of Greenland; largest National Park in the world.
Argentine Antarctica	965,597	Argentine claim over Antarctica
Tanzania	945,087	Country in Africa. Includes the islands of Mafia, Pemba, and Zanzibar.
Argentine Sea	940,000	Body of water within the continental shelf off the Argentine mainland. It extends from Buenos Aires Province coast on the North to the Falkland Islands on the South.
British Columbia	925,186	Province of Canada. Land area only.
Nigeria	923,768	Country in Africa.
Merovengian Kingdom of Francia	918,881	The Frankish Kingdom after the conquest of Burgundy, lasting from 536-768.
Ontario	917,741	Second largest province of Canada. Land area only. With water area can excess 1,000,000
Venezuela	916,445	Country in South America; does not include claims of the Guyana–Venezuela territorial dispute. If included, the area would be 1,075,945 km^{2}.
Mato Grosso	903,358	State of Brazil.
Kalahari Desert	900,000	Semi-arid sandy savannah in Southern Africa.
Taymyrsky Dolgano-Nenetsky District	897,900	Largest second-level administrative divisions in Russia.
Pakistan (including disputed areas)	880,254	Country in South Asia. Includes Pakistani-administered disputed territories (Azad Kashmir and Northern Areas).
Grand Duchy of Lithuania	876,600	A large medieval pagan empire in Europe lasting from 1253-1569 as an independent state, prior to its union with Poland. Measured at its greatest extent in the 15th century.
Cyrenaica	855,370	Eastern coastal region of Libya.
(Alaska) Unorganized Borough	837,700	Subdivided part of Alaska, largest "borough" of the state.
Namibia	824,292	Country in Africa.
(Russia) Ural economic region	824,000	Economic region of Russia.
Holy Roman Empire	814,415	Central European Confederacy from 962-1806. Measured at its largest extent under Ferdinand II, Holy Roman Emperor.
Mozambique	801,590	Country in Africa.
New South Wales	800,642	State of Australia.
Akkadian Empire	800,000	An ancient middle eastern empire centered on the Fertile Crescent, lasting from 2400-2200 BC.
Pakistan (non-disputed areas)	796,095	Country in South Asia. Excludes all disputed territories.
East China	795,837	A statistical region of China.
Northeast China (Without eastern Inner Mongolia)	793,300	A statistical region of China.
Khabarovsk Krai	788,600	Federal subject of Russia.
New Guinea	786,000	Island divided between Indonesia and Papua New Guinea.
Turkey	783,562	Country partly in Europe and partly in Asia.
(United States) East North Central states	780,541	Division of the United States. Contains the states of Michigan, Wisconsin, Illinois, Indiana, and Ohio.
Union between Sweden and Norway (United Kingdom of Sweden and Norway)	774,184	A Kingdom in Scandinavia between 1814-1905.
(Western Australia) Goldfields–Esperance	771,276	Largest region of Western Australia.
Irkutsk Oblast	767,900	Federal subject of Russia.
Evenkiysky District	763,200	Second largest second-level administrative divisions in Russia.
(United States) South Atlantic states	758,842	Division of the United States. Contains the states of Virginia, West Virginia, North Carolina, South Carolina, Georgia, Florida, Maryland, Delaware and District of Columbia.
Chile	756,096	Includes Easter Island (Isla de Pascua; Rapa Nui) and Isla Sala y Gómez, excludes claims on Antarctica (1,250,000 km^{2}).
Zambia	752,618	Country in Africa.
Yamalo-Nenets Autonomous Okrug	750,300	Federal subject of Russia.
Scandinavian Peninsula	750,000	Peninsula in Europe, occupied by Norway and Sweden.
Borneo	748,168	Island divided between Brunei, Indonesia and Malaysia.
(Quebec) Nord-du-Québec	747,191.93	Largest subdivisions of Quebec.
Chukotka Autonomous Okrug	737,700	Federal subject of Russia.
(China) Qinghai	721,200	Largest province of China.
Oregon Territory	720,011	Territory acquired from Britain by the US in 1848.
Eastern Province, Saudi Arabia (Ash Sharqiyah)	710,000	Largest province of Saudi Arabia.
Texas	696,200	State of the United States.
Visigothic Kingdom	684,738	A Germanic Kingdom on the Iberian peninsula, lasting from 474-723. Measured at its apex in 500.
Austria-Hungary	676,615	Central European empire from 1867 to 1918.
Myanmar	676,578	Country in Southeast Asia.
Patagonian Desert	673,000	Largest desert in South America.
(Niger) Agadez Region	667,799	Largest region of Niger.
(Greenland) Qaasuitsup	660,000	Largest municipality of Greenland.
(Russia) Central Federal District	652,800	Federal district of Russia, created May 2000.
Afghanistan	652,090	Country in Central Asia.
(Brazil) (Argentina) (Paraguay) (Bolivia) Gran Chaco	647,000	Geographical region in South America.
France	643,801	Third largest European country (Metropolitan France only). While not fully part of France, the French Republic also includes French Overseas Collectivity and covers 674,843 km^{2}, excluding claims on Antarctica (432,000 km^{2}). With its overseas territories France precedes Ukraine as the second largest European country.
Alberta	642,317	Province of Canada. Land area only
Somalia	637,657	Country in Africa.
Nazi Germany	633,786	Nazi Germany encompasses present day Germany, and a few other territories.
Austrian Empire	625,418	A central European empire lasting from 1804-1867
(South Australia) Outback Communities Authority	624,339	Largest second level administrative division of Australia.
Central African Republic	622,984	Country in Africa.
South Sudan	619,745	Country in Africa.
Merovengian Kingdom of Francia	611,759	The Frankish Kingdom at its founding under Clovis I in 481.
Ukraine	603,700	Second largest European country.
(Chad) Borkou-Ennedi-Tibesti Region	600,350	Largest region of Chad.
Saskatchewan	591,670	Province of Canada. Land area only.
Arkhangelsk Oblast	589,200	Federal district of Russia, created May 2000.
Madagascar	587,041	Island country in Africa. Second largest country composed of a single island (after Australia).
Minas Gerais	586,528	State of Brazil.
Ostrogothic Kingdom	586,046	A Germanic Kingdom in Italy and Illyria after the fall of the Western Roman Empire, lasting from 476-553. Measurement is approximate.
Iberian Peninsula	581,471	A peninsula of Southwest Europe, occupied by Spain and Portugal.
Botswana	581,730	Country in Africa.
Kenya	580,367	Country in Africa.
Caliphate of Córdoba	570,000	A Moorish Caliphate in Iberia after the local withdrawal of the Fatimid Caliphate, lasting from 756-1031.
Bahia	564,693	State of Brazil.
(Algeria) Tamanrasset Province	557,906	Largest province of Algeria.
Manitoba	553,556	Province of Canada. Land area only.
(Libya) Fezzan	551,700	Southwestern region of modern Libya.
Metropolitan France	551,500	The parts of France which are on the European Continent.
German Empire	540,000	The unified German state from 1871-1918.
(Saudi Arabia) Al-Ahsa Governorate	534,000	Largest second level administrative division of Saudi Arabia.
(Greenland) Sermersooq	531,900	Second largest second level administrative division of Greenland.
Yemen	527,968	Country in Middle East. Includes Perim, Socotra, the former Yemen Arab Republic (YAR or North Yemen), and the former People's Democratic Republic of Yemen (PDRY or South Yemen).
Khanty–Mansi Autonomous Okrug	523,100	Federal subject of Russia.
(Greenland) Avannaata	522,700	Third largest second level administrative division of Greenland.
Central America	521,499	Region between North America and South America.
Thailand	513,115	Country in Southeast Asia.
(Western Australia) Pilbara	771,276	Second largest region of Western Australia.
(Canada) Baffin Island	507,451	Island in Canadian Arctic.
Spain	505,992	Country in Europe. Includes mainland Spain, the Balearic Islands and Canary Islands, as well as the Spanish possessions (Plazas de Soberanía) off the coast of Morocco (Ceuta, Melilla, Islas Chafarinas, Peñón de Alhucemas, and Peñón de Vélez de la Gomera), and Isla de Alborán almost midway between Morocco and Spain, all the latter being claimed by Morocco.
Balkan peninsula	505,000	Southeasternmost peninsula of Europe.
Atlantic Canada	500,531	Smallest main region of Canada.
Middle Kingdom of Egypt	500,000	Second Egyptian dynastic empire lasting from 2080-1640 BC.
Neo-Babylonian Empire	500,000	An ancient Middle Eastern empire centered on the Fertile Crescent, lasting from 626 to 539 BC.
Aztec Empire	500,000	A Meso-American Empire in Mexico lasting from 1325-1521.
(Mali) Tombouctou Region	496,611	Largest region of Mali
Turkmenistan	488,100	Country in Central Asia
Denmark-Norway	487,476	A Scandinavian kingdom lasting from 1536 to 1814.
(China) Sichuan	485,000	Province of China.
(Libya) Kufra District	483,510	Largest district of Libya. The 32 districts were reorganized into 22 Sha'biyah in 2007, but Kufra appears to have retained its borders.
(Western Australia) Mid West	478,000	Third largest region of Western Australia.
Cameroon	475,442	Country in Africa.
(United States) East South Central states	475,014	Division of the United States. Contains the states of Alabama, Mississippi, Tennessee and Kentucky.
Yukon	474,391	Territory of Canada.
Kamchatka Krai	472,300	Federal subject of Russia.
(China) Bayingolin Mongol Autonomous Prefecture	471,526	Largest autonomous prefecture of China.
Northeastern United States	469,615	Region of the United States. Maine, New York, New Hampshire, Vermont, Massachusetts, Connecticut, Rhode Island, Pennsylvania and New Jersey.
Weimar Republic	468,787	German state from 1918 to 1933.
Papua New Guinea	462,840	Country in Oceania.
Magadan Oblast	461,400	Federal subject of Russia.
(China) Heilongjiang	454,800	Province of China.
(China) Gansu	453,700	Province of China.
(China) Nagqu	450,537	City of China.
(New Zealand) Ross Dependency	450,000	New Zealand claim to Antarctica.
Sweden	449,964	Country in Europe. Includes Gotland and Öland.
Uzbekistan	447,400	Country in Central Asia; largest doubly landlocked country of the world.
Morocco	446,550	Country in Africa; excluding Western Sahara.
(Indonesia) Sumatra	443,066	Island in Indonesia.
Iraq	438,317	Country in Middle East.
(Russia) North Caucasus Economic Region (including disputed areas)	433,228	Economic region of Russia, including Sevastopol and the Republic of Crimea.
(French Southern and Antarctic Lands) Adélie Land	432,000	French claim to Antarctica; largest district of the French Southern and Antarctic Lands.
Zabaykalsky Krai	431,500	Federal subject of Russia.
(Kazakhstan) Karagandy Province	428,000	Largest province of Kazakhstan.
(Algeria) Adrar Province	427,368	Second largest province of Algeria.
(Western Australia) Kimberley	424,517	Most northern region of Western Australia.
California	423,970	State of the United States.
Papua	421,981	Province of Indonesia, status uncertain following Indonesian declaration of intent to subdivide into smaller provinces.
(Canada) Queen Elizabeth Islands	419,061	Subsection of islands in the Arctic Archipelago.
Komi Republic	415,900	Federal subject of Russia.
(Saudi Arabia) Riyadh Province	412,000	Second largest province of Saudi Arabia.
Arkhangelsk Oblast	410,700	Federal subject of Russia.
Gulf of Aden	410,000	Sea in between the Horn of Africa and the Arabian Peninsula.
Paraguay	406,752	Country in South America.
(Russia) North Caucasus Economic Region (non-disputed areas)	405,400	Economic region of Russia, not including Sevastopol and the Republic of Crimea.
Old Kingdom	400,000	The first unified Egyptian empire lasting from 2686–2134 BC.
Middle Assyrian period	400,000	An ancient Middle Eastern kingdom in the Fertile Crescent, lasting from 1365–1000 BC.
(China) Yunnan	394,000	Province of China.
(China) Nagqu	391,817	Largest prefecture-level city of China.
Zimbabwe	390,757	Country in Africa.
Kurdistan	390,000(Est.)	Region in the Middle East; homeland of the Kurds
Second Polish Republic	389,720	Country in Interwar Europe. Size accounts for area peak in 1939.
Norway (total)	385,155	Country in Europe. Includes mainland Norway (324,220 km^{2}) and the integral overseas areas of Svalbard and Jan Mayen (60,980 km^{2}); excludes the dependency of Bouvet Island (49 km^{2}) and the Antarctic dependency claims of Queen Maud Land and Peter I Island (~2,500,000 km^{2}).
Yukon-Koyukuk Census Area	382,810	Census area in the U.S. State of Alaska, largest county-equivalent in the United States.
Montana	380,838	State of the United States.
Japan	377,873	Country in Asia. Includes Ryukyu Islands (including Daitō Islands), Ogasawara Islands (Bonin Islands), Minami-Torishima (Marcus Island), Okino-Torishima and Volcano Islands (Kazan Islands); excludes the southern Kuril Islands.
Baltic Sea	377,000	Sea in Europe, bordered to the north by Sweden and Finland, to the east by Finland, Russia, Estonia, Latvia, and Lithuania, on the south by Poland and Germany, and on the West by Denmark.
New Valley Governorate	376,505	Largest governorate of Egypt.
Newfoundland and Labrador	373,872	Province of Canada.
(South Africa) Northern Cape	372,889	Largest province of South Africa.
Caspian Sea	371,000	Body of water in Central Asia variously classed as the world's largest lake or a full-fledged sea. Between Russia, Kazakhstan, Azerbaijan, Turkmenistan, and Iran.
Santa Cruz Department	370,621	Largest department of Bolivia.
Loreto Region	368,852	Largest region of Peru.
Amur Oblast	363,700	Federal subject of Russia.
Mato Grosso do Sul	357,125	State of Brazil.
Germany	357,022	Country in Europe; before the German reunification took place on 3 October 1990, Germany consisted of the former Federal Republic of Germany (FRG, West Germany) with 248,689 km^{2} and the German Democratic Republic (GDR, East Germany) with 108,333 km^{2}.
(Ethiopia) Oromia Region	353,632	Largest region of Ethiopia.
(Libya) Tripolitania	353,000	Historic region and former province of Libya.
(Buryatia) Buryat Republic	351,300	Federal subject of Russia.
(Libya) Murzuq District	349,790	2nd largest district of Libya. The 32 districts were reorganized into 22 Sha'biyah in 2007, but Murzuq appears to have retained its borders.
Kingdom of Prussia	348,779	Former European kingdom-state between 1701 1918. Measured area from 1871.
(Sudan) Northern	348,765	Largest state of Sudan.
(Balochistan, Pakistan) Balochistan	347,190	Largest province of Pakistan.
Rajasthan	342,236	Largest state of India.
Republic of the Congo	342,000	Country in Africa.
Goiás	340,087	State of Brazil.
Finland	338,145	Country in Europe. Includes Åland.
South Yemen	332,970	Former country in the Middle East from 1967 to 1990; now reunified into Yemen.
Maranhão	331,983	State of Brazil.
Vietnam	331,689	Country in Southeast Asia.
Malaysia	329,847	Country in Southeast Asia.
(China) Haixi Mongol and Tibetan Autonomous Prefecture	325,785	Second largest autonomous prefecture of China.
Norway (excluding self-governing territories)	323,941	Country in Europe. Includes mainland Norway; excludes the integral overseas areas of Svalbard and Jan Mayen (60,980 km^{2}), the dependency of Bouvet Island (49 km^{2}) and the Antarctic dependency claims of Queen Maud Land and Peter I Island (~2,500,000 km^{2}).
Côte d'Ivoire	322,463	Country in Africa.
Tomsk Oblast	316,900	Federal subject of Russia.
British Isles	315,134	A series of islands in northern Europe.
New Mexico	314,915	State of the United States.
Poland	312,685	Country in Central Europe.
Oman	309,500	Country in Middle East.
Madhya Pradesh	308,144	State of India.
Maharashtra	307,713	State of India
Buenos Aires Province	307,571	Largest province of Argentina
Italy	301,318	Country in Europe
(Kazakhstan) Aktobe Province	300,600	Second-largest province of Kazakhstan.
Philippines	300,000	Country in Southeast Asia.
(Sudan) North Darfur	296,420	Second largest state of Sudan.
Arizona	295,254	State of the United States
Kingdom of Romania	295,049	Kingdom of Romania (1881–1947) at its greater extent in between 1919 and 1940
(Anadyrsky District) Anadyrsky	287,900	Administrative and municipal district of Chukotka.
Nevada	286,351	State of the United States
Yugoslavia	284,710	A Balkan country lasting from 1918 to 1992.
(Algeria) Illizi Province	284,618	Province of Algeria.
Ecuador	283,561	Country in South America. Includes Galápagos Islands.
East Kazakhstan Province	283,300	Third largest province of Kazakhstan.
(United States) Mid-Atlantic states	283,168	Division of the United States. New York, Pennsylvania and New Jersey.
Rio Grande do Sul	281,749	State of Brazil.
Somali Region	279,252	Second largest region of Ethiopia.
Tocantins	277,621	State of Brazil.
Andhra Pradesh	275,068	State of India.
Burkina Faso	274,000	Country in Africa.
New Zealand	270,534	Country in Oceania. Includes Antipodes Islands, Auckland Islands, Bounty Islands, Campbell Island, Chatham Islands, and Kermadec Islands. Excludes Niue (260 km^{2}), the Cook Islands (236 km^{2}) and Tokelau (12 km^{2}), as well as the Antarctic claim of Ross Dependency (450,000 km^{2}).
Colorado	269,601	State of the United States.
Gabon	267,668	Country in Africa.
Western Sahara	266,000	Country in Africa; largely occupied by Morocco, some territory administered by the Sahrawi Arab Democratic Republic.
(Russia) Volga-Vyatka	265,400	Economic Region of Russia.
Lake Agassiz	260,000	Former Largest glacial lake
Oregon	254,805	State of the United States.
Wyoming	253,348	State of the United States.
Michigan	253,266	State of the United States.
(Mauritania) Tiris Zemmour	252,900	Largest region of Mauritania.
Piauí	251,529	State of Brazil.
Serbian Empire	250,000	Serbian medieval empire from 1346–1371.
West Germany	248,689	Former country in Europe from 1949 to 1990; now reunified into Germany.
São Paulo	248,209	State of Brazil.
Guinea	245,857	Country in Africa.
North Slope Borough, Alaska	245,436	County of Alaska; largest county in the United States, and largest organized political subdivision that is not a state.
East Kalimantan	245,238	Province of Indonesia.
Chihuahua	244,938	Largest state of Mexico.
Great Lakes	244,100	Lake system in North America, predominately between Canada and the United States.
Santa Cruz	243,943	Second largest province of Argentina.
United Kingdom	242,900	Country in Europe. Excludes the three Crown dependencies (768 km^{2}), the 13 British overseas territories (17,027 km^{2}) and the British Antarctic Territory (1,395,000 km^{2}).
(Castile (historical region)) Crown of Castile	241,782	Royal union of Kingdoms in Spain lasting from 1230–1760, also known as the Kingdom of Castile y Leon.
Uganda	241,038	Country in Africa.
Uttar Pradesh	238,566	State of India.
Ghana	238,533	Country in Africa.
Romania	238,391	Country in Central Europe.
Bolívar	238,000	Largest state of Venezuela.
(China) Guangxi	237,600	Autonomous region of China.
Rondônia	237,576	State of Brazil.
Laos	236,800	Country in Southeast Asia.
Caribbean	234,917	Also known as the West Indies, all the islands of the Caribbean Sea including the Greater Antilles, the Lesser Antilles and the Lucayan Archipelago.
Sichuan Basin	229,500	Lowland region in southwestern China.
Victoria	227,146	State of Australia.
(Kazakhstan) Kyzylorda Province	226,000	Province of Kazakhstan.
Minnesota	225,365	State of the United States.
(Japan) Honshu	225,800	The biggest of the four main islands of Japan.
Chubut	224,686	Third largest province of Argentina.
Roraima	224,299	State of Brazil.
(Kazakhstan) Almaty Province	224,000	Province of Kazakhstan.
(Angola) Moxico Province	223,023	Largest province of Angola.
Jammu and Kashmir	222,236	State of India.
North Kurdufan	221,900	Third largest state of Sudan.
Korea	220,186	Country in Asia prior to 1948; now divided into North Korea and South Korea.
Utah	219,887	State of the United States.
Kingdom of Hungary	218,915	A European Kingdom lasting from 1000–1804. Measured at its apex in 1450.
Red Sea	218,887	State of Sudan.
(Canada) Victoria Island	217,291	Second-largest island in the Arctic Archipelago.
Idaho	216,446	State of the United States.
(Mauritania) Adrar	215,300	Second largest region of Mauritania.
Guyana	214,969	Country in South America.
Beni Department	213,564	Second largest department of Bolivia.
Kansas	213,096	State of the United States.
(Matrouh Governorate) Matruh Governorate	212,112	Second largest governorate of Egypt.
(Algeria) Ouargla Province	211,980	Province of Algeria.
(China) Hunan	210,000	Province of China.
Great Britain	209,331	An island of the British Isles, largest of that group.
Belarus	207,600	Largest landlocked country in Europe.
Greater Antilles	207,435	An island grouping in the Caribbean.
(China) Shaanxi	205,600	Province of China.
(Punjab, Pakistan) Punjab	205,344	Second largest province of Pakistan.
Red Sea Governorate	203,685	Third largest governorate of Egypt.
Río Negro	203,013	Province of Argentina.
Nebraska	200,345	State of the United States.
Kyrgyzstan	199,900	Country in Central Asia.
South Dakota	199,731	State of the United States.
(Democratic Republic of the Congo) Tshopo	199,567	Province of the Democratic Republic of the Congo.
Paraná	199,315	State of Brazil.
(China) Ruoqiang County	199,222	County of China. Largest third-level administrative division in the world.
(Angola) Cuando Cubango Province	199,049	Second largest province of Angola.
Senegal	196,722	Country in Africa.
(Canada) Ellesmere Island	196,236	Third-largest island in the Arctic Archipelago.
Gujarat	196,024	State of India.
(Kazakhstan) Kostanay Province	196,000	Province of Kazakhstan.
North Yemen	195,000	Former country in the Middle East from 1967 to 1990; now reunified into Yemen.
Sverdlovsk Oblast	194,800	Federal subject of Russia.
Karnataka	191,791	State of India.
Kingdom of the Lombards	189,418	A Germanic Kingdom in northern Italy, lasting from 568-774.
(China) Hebei	187,700	Province of China.
(China) Jilin	187,400	Province of China.
(United States) New England	186,447	Division of the United States. Maine, New Hampshire, Vermont, Massachusetts, Connecticut and Rhode Island.
(China) Hubei	185,900	Province of China.
Syria (including disputed areas)	185,180	Country in Middle East. Including the Golan Heights.
Washington	184,665	State of the United States.
Syria (non-disputed areas)	183,885	Country in Middle East. Excluding the Golan Heights.
North Dakota	183,112	State of the United States.
(Mauritania) Hodh Ech Chargui	182,700	Third largest region of Mauritania.
Sonora	182,052	State of Mexico.
(Iran) Sistan and Baluchestan province	181,785	Largest province of Iran.
Oklahoma	181,035	State of the United States.
Cambodia	181,035	Country in Southeast Asia.
(Iran) Kerman province	180,836	Second largest province of Iran.
(Indonesia) Sulawesi	180,681	Island of Indonesia.
Missouri	180,533	State of the United States.
Amazonas (Venezuelan state)	180,145	Second largest state of Venezuela.
(China) Guangdong	180,000	Province of China.
Novosibirsk Oblast	178,200	Federal subject of Russia.
Nenets Autonomous Okrug	176,700	Federal subject of Russia.
Somaliland	176,210	Historic region of Somalia.
(China) Guizhou	176,000	Province of China.
Uruguay	175,016	Country in South America.
(Kenya) Rift Valley Province	173,854	Largest province of Kenya.
(Saudi Arabia) Al Madinah (Medina)	173,000	Third largest province of Saudi Arabia.
Republic of Karelia	172,400	Federal subject of Russia.
(Mali) Gao Region	170,572	Second largest region of Mali.
Tuva Republic	170,500	Federal subject of Russia.
Florida	170,304	State of the United States.
(Democratic Republic of the Congo) Kasai-Oriental	170,302	Province of the Democratic Republic of the Congo.
Wisconsin	169,639	State of the United States.
Altai Krai	169,100	Federal subject of Russia.
Eastern Cape	168,966	Second largest province of South Africa.
(Yemen) Hadhramaut Governorate	167,280	Largest governorate of Yemen.
(China) Jiangxi	167,000	Province of China.
(China) Henan	167,000	Province of China.
Primorsky Krai	165,900	Federal subject of Russia.
(Kazakhstan) Mangystau Province	165,600	Province of Kazakhstan.
Karakalpakstan	165,600	Largest region of Uzbekistan.
(Ömnögovi Province) Ömnögovi	165,400	Largest aimag of Mongolia.
Córdoba	165,321	Province of Argentina.
Kingdom of the Burgundians	164,166	A Germanic Kingdom in west-central France, lasting from 411-533.
(Saudi Arabia) Makkah Province	164,000	Province of Saudi Arabia.
Suriname	163,820	Country in South America.
Tunisia	163,610	Country in Africa.
(Algeria) Béchar Province	162,200	Province of Algeria.
Tyumen Oblast	161,800	Federal subject of Russia.
(Madagascar) Toliara Province	161,405	Largest Province of Madagascar.
(Namibia) ǁKaras Region	161,215	Largest region of Namibia.
Padania	160,908	Regional Area of Northern Italy as claimed by the Lega Nord
Perm Krai	160,600	Federal subject of Russia.
(Kenya) Eastern Province	159,891	Second largest Province of Kenya.
Amhara Region	159,174	Third largest region of Ethiopia.
(Algeria) Tindouf Province	159,000	Province of Algeria.
(Sudan) South Kordufan	158,355	State of Sudan.
Shan State	158,222	Largest state of Myanmar (Myanmar has certain administrative divisions titled as Divisions, and others titled as States).
(China) Shanxi	156,300	Province of China.
Odisha	155,707	State of India.
Salta	155,488	Province of Argentina.
Georgia (U.S. state)	153,909	State of the United States.
(China) Shandong	153,800	Province of China.
Central Kalimantan	153,564	Province of Indonesia.
Acre	152,581	State of Brazil.
(Mali) Kidal Region	151,430	Third largest region of Mali.
West Kazakhstan Province	151,300	Province of Kazakhstan.
(New Zealand) South Island	150,437	Largest island of New Zealand.
(Madagascar) Mahajanga Province	150,023	Second largest Province of Madagascar.
Old Assyrian period	150,000	An ancient Middle Eastern kingdom in the Fertile Crescent, lasting from 1920-1740 BC.
Illinois	149,998	State of the United States.
Coahuila	149,982	State of Mexico.
Mendoza	148,827	Province of Argentina.
Ceará	148,826	State of Brazil.
(Democratic Republic of the Congo) Bas-Uele	148,331	Province of the Democratic Republic of the Congo.
(Zambia) Northern Province	147,826	Largest province of Zambia.
(Botswana) Central District	147,730	Largest district of Botswana.
Nepal	147,181	Country in South Asia.
West Kalimantan	146,807	Province of Indonesia.
(China) Liaoning	145,900	Province of China.
Iowa	145,743	State of the United States.
Vologda Oblast	145,700	Federal subject of Russia.
(Niger) Zinder Department	145,430	Second largest department of Niger.
Murmansk Oblast	144,900	Federal subject of Russia.
(Iran) Razavi Khorasan province	144,681	Third largest province of Iran.
(Kazakhstan) Zhambyl Province	144,000	Province of Kazakhstan.
Bangladesh	143,998	Country in Southeast Asia.
Bashkortostan	143,600	Federal subject of Russia.
La Pampa	143,440	Province of Argentina.
Tajikistan	143,100	Country in Central Asia.
Amapá	142,815	State of Brazil.
(Govi-Altai Province) Govi-Altai	141,400	Second largest aimag of Mongolia.
New York	141,299	State of the United States.
Sindh	140,914	Third largest province of Pakistan.
(Niger) Diffa Department	140,216	Third largest department of Niger.
Omsk Oblast	139,700	Federal subject of Russia.
(China) Anhui	139,700	Province of China.
(Morocco) Laâyoune-Boujdour-Sakia El Hamra	139,480	Largest region of Morocco.
Republic of Yucatán	139,426	Sovereign country in North America, 1841–1848.
North Carolina	139,389	State of the United States.
(Saudi Arabia) Al Jawf Province	139,000	Province of Saudi Arabia.
(Indonesia) Java	138,794	Island of Indonesia.
(Turkmenistan) Balkan Province	138,000	Largest province of Turkmenistan.
Arkansas	137,732	State of the United States.
Santiago del Estero	136,351	Province of Argentina.
Alabama	135,765	State of the United States.
Chhattisgarh	135,194	State of India.
(Democratic Republic of the Congo) Tanganyika Province	134,940	Province of the Democratic Republic of the Congo.
Louisiana	134,264	State of the United States.
La Paz Department	133,985	Third largest department of Bolivia.
Santa Fe	133,007	Province of Argentina.
(Democratic Republic of the Congo) Tshuapa	132,940	Province of the Democratic Republic of the Congo.
(Democratic Republic of the Congo) Haut-Katanga Province	132,425	Province of the Democratic Republic of the Congo.
(Antártica Chilena Province) Magallanes and Antártica Chilena	132,297	Largest region of Chile (including Antarctic claims).
(Democratic Republic of the Congo) Maniema	132,250	Province of the Democratic Republic of the Congo.
Greece	131,957	Country in Europe.
England	130,395	Largest constituent country of the United Kingdom.
Tamil Nadu	130,058	State of India.
Nicaragua	130,000	Largest country in Central America; excludes San Andrés y Providencia islands (disputed territories with Colombia).
(Botswana) North-West District	129,930	Second largest district of Botswana.
Free State (South African province)	129,825	Third largest province of South Africa.
Kingdom of Poland	129,707	Medieval central European Kingdom, lasting from 1025-1569 when it formed a union with Lithuania. Size is approximate.
Western Cape	129,462	Province of South Africa.
(Iran) Yazd province	129,285	Province of Iran.
(Mozambique) Niassa Province	129,056	Largest province of Mozambique.
Czechoslovakia	127,900	Central European country between 1918 and 1992.
(Democratic Republic of the Congo) Mai-Ndombe Province	127,465	Province of the Democratic Republic of the Congo.
(Sudan) South Darfur	127,300	State of Sudan.
(Saudi Arabia) Northern Borders Region	127,000	Province of Saudi Arabia.
(Kenya) North Eastern Province	126,902	Third largest province of Kenya.
(Zambia) Western Province	126,386	Second largest province of Zambia.
(Zambia) North-Western Province	125,827	Third largest province of Zambia.
Limpopo	125,754	Province of South Africa.
Mississippi	125,434	State of the United States.
(Antofagasta Region) Antofagasta	125,306	Largest region of Chile (excluding Antarctic claims).
(Saudi Arabia) Ha'il Province	125,000	Province of Saudi Arabia.
(Kazakhstan) Pavlodar Province	124,800	Province of Kazakhstan.
Sarawak	124,450	Largest state of Malaysia.
Orenburg Oblast	124,000	Federal subject of Russia.
(Dornod Province) Dornod	123,600	Third largest aimag of Mongolia.
North Kazakhstan Province	123,200	Province of Kazakhstan.
Durango	123,181	State of Mexico.
(Morocco) Guelmim-Es Semara	122,825	Second largest region of Morocco.
(Iran) Fars province	122,608	Province of Iran.
(Sudan) Jungoli	122,479	State of Sudan.
(Tsardom of Bulgaria (1908–1946)) Kingdom of Bulgaria	122,134	Measured at apex before WWI.
(Sudan) River Nile	122,123	State of Sudan.
(Kazakhstan) Akmola Province	121,400	Province of Kazakhstan.
(Democratic Republic of the Congo) Lualaba Province	121,308	Province of the Democratic Republic of the Congo.
(China) Fujian	121,300	Province of China.
Kirov Oblast	120,800	Federal subject of Russia.
North Korea	120,538	Country in Asia.
Emirate of Granada	120,337	Moorish Vassal to the Kingdom of Castile lasting from 1228-1492, measured at its apex in 1228.
(Mali) Kayes Region	119,743	Region of Mali.
Overseas France	119,396	Consists of all the French-administered territories outside Europe.
Pennsylvania	119,283	State of the United States.
(Saudi Arabia) Najran Province	119,000	Province of Saudi Arabia.
South Kazakhstan Province	118,600	Province of Kazakhstan.
(Kazakhstan) Atyrau Province	118,600	Province of Kazakhstan.
Malawi	118,484	Country in Africa.
Potosí Department	118,218	Department of Bolivia.
(Botswana) Ghanzi District	117,910	Third largest district of Botswana.
Eritrea	117,600	Country in Africa. Includes Badme region.
Lake Michigan-Huron	117,300	Lake in North America, between Canada and the United States.
Ohio	116,096	State of the United States.
(Bayankhongor Province) Bayankhongor	116,000	Aimag of Mongolia.
Puntland	116,000	Historic region of Somalia.
(Greenland) Qeqqata	115,500	Second smallest municipality of Greenland.
(Namibia) Kunene Region	115,293	Second largest region of Namibia.
Telangana	114,840	A state of India, which was formed on 2 June 2014.
(Chad) Kanem	114,520	Second largest region of Chad.
Volgograd Oblast	113,900	Federal subject of Russia.
(New Zealand) North Island	113,729	Second largest island of New Zealand.
Benin	112,622	Country in Africa.
(Ethiopia) Southern Nations, Nationalities, and People's Region	112,343	Region of Ethiopia.
(Magallanes y la Antártica Chilena Region) Magallanes and Antártica Chilena	112,310	Second largest region of Chile (excluding Antarctic claims).
Honduras	112,088	Country in Central America.
Kingdom of Sicily	111,900	A medieval kingdom centered on the Island of Sicily and in southern Italy, lasting from 1130-1282.
Kingdom of the Two Sicilies	111,900	A kingdom centered on the Island of Sicily and in southern Italy, lasting from 1811-1861.
Liberia	111,369	Country in Africa.
Bulgaria	110,912	Country in Europe.
Cuba	110,861	Largest country in the Caribbean.
(Uzbekistan) Navoiy Region	110,800	Second largest region of Uzbekistan.
Virginia	110,785	State of the United States.
(Philippines) Luzon	109,965	Island of the Philippines.
(Amazonas (Colombian department)) Amazonas Department	109,665	Largest district of Colombia.
(Namibia) Hardap Region	109,651	Third largest region of Namibia.
(Dornogovi Province) Dornogovi	109,500	Aimag of Mongolia.
Tennessee	109,151	State of the United States.
(Cameroon) East Province	109,011	Largest province of Cameroon.
Guatemala	108,889	Country in Central America.
(Canada) Newfoundland	108,860	Island in Canada.
East Germany	108,333	Former country in Europe from 1949 to 1990; now reunified into Germany.
(Democratic Republic of the Congo) Haut-Lomami Province	108,204	Province of the Democratic Republic of the Congo.
(Saudi Arabia) Tabuk Province	108,000	Province of Saudi Arabia.
(Aysén Region) Aisén	107,153	Third largest region of Chile.
(Iran) Isfahan province	107,029	Province of Iran.
(Botswana) Kgalagadi District	106,940	District of Botswana.
(Niger) Tahoua Department	106,677	Department of Niger.
Cuba (main island)	105,806	Main island of the Caribbean country of Cuba.
(Namibia) Otjozondjupa	105,185	Region of Namibia.
(Mozambique) Zambezia Province	105,008	Second largest province of Mozambique.
(Democratic Republic of the Congo) Sankuru	105,000	Province of the Democratic Republic of the Congo.
(South Africa) North West	104,882	Province of South Africa.
Kentucky	104,659	State of the United States.
Kingdom of Aragon	103,088	Constituent Kingdom of Spain lasting from 1035-1515.
Iceland	103,000	Country in Europe.
Anangu Pitjantjatjara Yankunytjatja	103,000	Australian local government area
(Angola) Lunda Norte Province	102,783	Third largest province of Angola.
Catamarca	102,602	Province of Argentina.
(China) Jiangsu	102,600	Province of China.
(Madagascar) Fianarantsoa Province	102,373	Third largest Province of Madagascar.
(China) Zhejiang	102,000	Province of China.
(Department of Ucayali) Ucayali Region	101,831	Second largest region of Peru.
Rostov Oblast	100,800	Federal subject of Russia.
(Mozambique) Tete Province	100,724	Third largest province of Mozambique.
(Khövsgöl Province) Khövsgöl	100,600	Aimag of Mongolia.
Vichada Department	100,242	Second largest district of Colombia.
Saratov Oblast	100,200	Federal subject of Russia.

== See also ==
Other divisions

- 0.1 to 1,000,000+ square kilometers
- 1,000,000+ square kilometers

Smaller divisions

- 200,000+ square kilometers • 100,000 to 1,000,000 square kilometers • 50,000 to 200,000 square kilometers • 20,000 to 50,000 square kilometers
- 5,000 to 20,000 square kilometers • 1,000 to 5,000 square kilometers • 0.1 to 1,000 square kilometers
- 500,000 to 1,000,000 square kilometers • 200,000 to 500,000 square kilometers • 100,000 to 200,000 square kilometers
- 50,000 to 100,000 square kilometers • 30,000 to 50,000 square kilometers • 20,000 to 30,000 square kilometers • 10,000 to 20,000 square kilometers
- 7,000 to 10,000 square kilometers • 5,000 to 7,000 square kilometers • 3,000 to 5,000 square kilometers • 1,000 to 3,000 square kilometers
- 250 to 1,000 square kilometers • 50 to 250 square kilometers • Under 50 square kilometers

Other

- List of countries and dependencies by area
- List of largest empires
- List of administrative divisions by country
- Category:Ranked lists of country subdivisions
