= Río Sábalo =

- Corregimiento
- Location within Panama
- Country: Panama
- Comarca: Emberá
- District: Sambú
- Established: November 8, 1983

Area
  - Land: 562.2 km^{2} (217.1 sq mi)

Population (2010)
  - Total: 1,800
  - Density: 3.2/km^{2} (8.3/sq mi)
- Population density calculated based on land area.
- Time zone: UTC−5 (EST)

Río Sábalo is a corregimiento in Sambú District, Comarca Emberá, Panama with a population of 12,881 as of 2010. It was created by Law 22 of November 8, 1983. Its population as of 1990 was 1,479; its population as of 2000 was 1,417.
