= List of political and geographic subdivisions by total area from 10,000 to 20,000 square kilometers =

This is one of a series of comprehensive lists of continents, countries, and first level administrative country subdivisions such as states, provinces, and territories, as well as certain political and geographic features of substantial area. References for the information provided in this table may be found in the individual articles on each body listed herein. Some divisions are listed twice, with one listing including territory that is excluded in the other for various reasons, including territorial disputes. There is intentional overlap among the lists in order to maximize ease of use.

Geographic entity	Area (km^{2})	Notes
(Nepal) Sudurpashchim	19,999.28	Province of Nepal.
(Central African Republic) Nana-Grébizi	19,996	Economic prefecture of the Central African Republic.
Johor	19,984	State of Malaysia.
(Ghana) Eastern Region	19,977	Region of Ghana.
Lower Silesian Voivodeship (Dolnośląskie)	19,947	Voivodeship of Poland.
Chüy Region	19,895	Region of Kyrgyzstan.
Huila Department	19,890	District of Colombia.
Rhineland-Palatinate (Rheinland-Pfalz)	19,847	State of Germany.
Lara	19,800	State of Venezuela.
(Morocco) Fès-Boulemane	19,795	Region of Morocco.
Leinster	19,774	A historical province of Ireland occupying the southeastern quarter of the island.
West Nusa Tenggara	19,709	Province of Indonesia.
Southern Province, Sierra Leone	19,694	Second largest province of Sierra Leonne.
(Burkina Faso) Centre-Nord	19,677	Region of Burkina Faso.
(Syria) Raqqa	19,618	Governorate of Syria.
(Nigeria) Edo State	19,584	State of Nigeria.
(Kamphaeng Phet province) Kamphaeng Phet Province	19,483	Third largest province of Thailand.
(Afghanistan) Paktika Province	19,482	Province of Afghanistan.
Lake Ontario	19,477	Lake in North America, between Canada and the United States.
(Central African Republic) Sangha-Mbaéré	19,412	Economic prefecture of the Central African Republic.
(Iran) Hamedan Province	19,368	Province of Iran.
Apulia	19,362	Region of Italy.
(Central African Republic) Lobaye	19,235	Third smallest prefecture of the Central African Republic.
Lower Austria	19,178	Largest state of Austria.
Bananal Island	19,162	Island in Brazil.
(Greece) Central Macedonia	19,147	Largest region of Greece.
(Turkey) Van Province	19,069	Province of Turkey.
(Senegal) Saint-Louis Region	19,044	Region of Senegal.
North Gyeongsang Province	19,024	Largest province of South Korea.
Agin-Buryat Autonomous Okrug	19,000	Federal subject of Russia. (also included in Zabaykalsky Territory total)
(Norway) Sør-Trøndelag	18,832	County of Norway.
(Iran) Tehran Province	18,814	Province of Iran.
(Japan) Shikoku	18,800	Island of Japan, region containing the prefectures of Tokushima, Kagawa, Ehime and Kōchi.
Bangka Belitung Islands	18,725	Province of Indonesia.
(Algeria) M'Sila Province	18,718	Province of Algeria.
Sogn og Fjordane	18,619	County of Norway.
(Sucumbíos Province) Sucumbíos	18,612	Province of Ecuador.
(Turkey) Şanlıurfa Province	18,584	Province of Turkey.
New Caledonia	18,575	French dependency.
(North Korea) South Hamgyŏng Province	18,558	Largest province of North Korea.
(Gabon) Moyen-Ogooué	18,535	Smallest province of Gabon.
(Syria) Aleppo	18,498	Governorate of Syria.
(Ghana) Upper West Region	18,477	Region of Ghana.
(Los Ríos Region) Los Ríos	18,430	Region of Chile.
Lake Balkhash	18,428	Lake in Kazakhstan.
(Burkina Faso) Cascades	18,424	Region of Burkina Faso.
Saxony (Sachsen)	18,416	State of Germany.
Manabí Province	18,400	Province of Ecuador.
Veneto	18,391	Region of Italy.
Chuvash Republic	18,300	Federal subject of Russia.
Pomeranian Voivodeship (Pomorskie)	18,293	Voivodeship of Poland.
Fiji	18,274	Country in Oceania.
Łódź Voivodeship (Łódzkie)	18,219	Voivodeship of Poland.
Gävleborg County	18,191	County of Sweden.
Gauteng	18,178	Smallest province of South Africa.
(Russia) Lake Ladoga	18,130	Lake in Russia.
(Concepción Department, Paraguay) Concepción Department	18,051	Department of Paraguay.
(Chad) Tandjilé	18,045	Region of Chad.
(Indonesia) Halmahera	18,040	Island part of Indonesia.
(Syria) Rif Dimashq	18,018	Governorate of Syria.
(Kuyavian–Pomeranian Voivodeship) Kuyavian-Pomeranian Voivodeship (Kujawsko-Pomorskie)	17,970	Voivodeship of Poland.
Subcarpathian Voivodeship (Podkarpackie)	17,926	Voivodeship of Poland.
Suez Governorate	17,840	Governorate of Egypt.
Kuwait	17,818	Country in Middle East.
(Cameroon) Northwest Province	17,812	Second smallest province of Cameroon.
(Iran) Ardabil Province	17,800	Province of Iran.
Connacht	17,713	A historical province of Ireland occupying the northwestern quarter of the island.
Aleutian Islands	17,670	Chain of islands divided between Russia and the U.S. state of Alaska
(Central African Republic) Basse-Kotto	17,604	Second smallest prefecture of the Central African Republic.
Värmland County	17,583	County of Sweden.
(Ivory Coast) Gôh-Djiboua District	17,580	District of Côte d'Ivoire.
(Indonesia) Seram Island	17,454	Island part of Indonesia.
(Yemen) Ma'rib Governorate	17,450	Governorate of Yemen.
(Nigeria) Gombe State	17,428	State of Nigeria.
Eswatini	17,364	Country in Africa.
(Afghanistan) Zabul Province	17,343	Province of Afghanistan.
(Afghanistan) Balkh Province	17,249	Province of Afghanistan.
Lazio	17,207	Region of Italy.
(Central African Republic) Kémo	17,204	Smallest prefecture of the Central African Republic.
Aral Sea	17,160	Lake in Central Asia, between Kazakhstan and Uzbekistan.
(Morocco) Tadla-Azilal	17,125	Region of Morocco.
(Nigeria) Delta State	17,095	State of Nigeria.
(Guinea) Mamou Region	17,074	Smallest region of Guinea.
Batken Region	17,048	Region of Kyrgyzstan.
Palawan	17,030.75	Largest province of the Philippines; includes the independent city of Puerto Princesa.
Republic of Serbian Krajina	17,028	Former unrecognized state in Europe.
(Togo) Plateaux	16,975	Largest region of Togo.
(Turkey) Kayseri Province	16,917	Province of Turkey.
(Senegal) Kédougou Region	16,896	Region of Senegal.
(Laos) Louangphabang	16,875	Second largest province of Laos.
(Arica y Parinacota Region) Arica and Parinacota	16,873	Region of Chile.
(Nigeria) Ogun State	16,850	State of Nigeria.
Wallonia	16,844	Region of Belgium.
West Sulawesi	16,796	Province of Indonesia.
(Tanzania) Mtwara	16,707	Region of Tanzania.
New Caledonia Grande Terre	16,648	Biggest island of New Caledonia.
(Honduras) Gracias a Dios	16,630	Second largest department of Honduras.
Pichincha Province	16,599	Province of Ecuador.
Nagaland	16,579	State of India.
(Itapúa Department) Itapúa	16,525	Department of Paraguay.
(Gangwon Province, South Korea) Gangwon Province	16,502	Second largest province of South Korea.
(Laos) Houaphan	16,500	Third largest province of Laos.
(Vietnam) Nghệ An Province	16,498.50	Largest province of Vietnam.
(Yemen) Abyan Governorate	16,450	Governorate of Yemen.
(Burkina Faso) Nord	16,414	Region of Burkina Faso.
Beijing	16,411	Capital of China, direct-controlled municipality.
(Tak province) Tak Province	16,407	Province of Thailand.
(Uzbekistan) Samarqand Region	16,400	Region of Uzbekistan.
Styria	16,392	Second largest state of Austria.
(Laos) Xaignabouli	16,389	Province of Laos.
(Valparaíso Region) Valparaíso	16,378	Region of Chile.
(Iran) Chahar Mahaal and Bakhtiari Province	16,332	Province of Iran.
(Laos) Khammouan	16,315	Province of Laos.
(Laos) Phongsali	16,270	Province of Laos.
Thuringia (Thüringen)	16,172	State of Germany.
(Kenya) Nyanza Province	16,162	Second smallest province of Kenya.
(Burkina Faso) Sud-Ouest	16,153	Region of Burkina Faso.
(Russia) Franz Josef Land	16,134	Archipelago part of Russia.
(North Korea) Chagang Province	16,076	Second largest province of North Korea.
(Department of Tacna) Tacna Region	16,076	Region of Peru.
(Canada) Bathurst Island	16,042	Island in the Arctic Archipelago.
Tonlé Sap	16,000	Lake in Cambodia, at the height of the monsoon season.
(Afghanistan) Sar-e Pol Province	15,999	Province of Afghanistan.
(O'Higgins Region) O'Higgins	15,950	Region of Chile.
(Laos) Vientiane Prefecture	15,927	Province of Laos.
(Laos) Xiangkhoang	15,880	Province of Laos.
(Turkey) Mersin province	15,853	Province of Turkey.
(Canada) Prince Patrick Island	15,848	Island in the Arctic Archipelago.
(Santiago Metropolitan Region) Región Metropolitana de Santiago	15,782	Smallest region of Chile.
Schleswig-Holstein	15,763	State of Germany.
(Ubon Ratchathani province) Ubon Ratchathani Province	15,745	Province of Thailand.
(Department of Moquegua) Moquegua Region	15,734	Region of Peru.
East New Britain Province	15,724	Province of Papua New Guinea.
Thurston Island	15,700	Island part of Antarctica.
Lake Vostok	15,690	Lake in Antarctica.
Hordaland	15,634	County of Norway.
Eastern Province, Sierra Leone	15,553	Smallest province of Sierra Leonne; second smallest first level subdivision.
Central Greece	15,549	Second largest region of Greece.
(Iran) Qazvin Province	15,549	Province of Iran.
(Vietnam) Gia Lai Province	15,536.90	Second largest province of Vietnam.
(Iran) Kohgiluyeh and Boyer-Ahmad Province	15,504	Province of Iran.
(Greece) Peloponnese	15,490	Third largest region of Greece.
Tacuarembó Department	15,438	Largest department of Uruguay.
(Laos) Champasak	15,415	Province of Laos.
(Laos) Oudomxai	15,370	Province of Laos.
North Sulawesi	15,364	Province of Indonesia.
(Turkey) Diyarbakır Province	15,355	Province of Turkey.
Telemark	15,313	County of Norway.
Chechen Republic	15,300	Federal subject of Russia. (the exact area is unknown as the border of Chechnya with Ingushetia has not been demarcated).
(Uzbekistan) Tashkent Region	15,300	Region of Uzbekistan.
Iwate	15,275.01	Second largest prefecture of Japan.
Esmeraldas Province	15,216	Province of Ecuador.
Portuguesa	15,200	State of Venezuela.
Lesser Poland Voivodeship (Małopolskie)	15,144	Voivodeship of Poland.
Møre og Romsdal	15,104	County of Norway.
Kaliningrad Oblast	15,100	Federal subject of Russia.
Southern Highlands Province	15,089	Province of Papua New Guinea.
Calabria	15,080	Region of Italy.
(Nigeria) Ondo State	15,019	State of Nigeria.
(Saudi Arabia) Al Bahah Province	15,000	Province of Saudi Arabia.
Buskerud	14,927	County of Norway.
Kelantan	14,922	State of Malaysia.
Alto Paraná	14,895	Department of Paraguay.
East Timor	14,874	Country in Southeast Asia.
(Laos) Bolikhamxai	14,863	Province of Laos.
Cojedes	14,800	State of Venezuela.
(Burkina Faso) Centre-Est	14,710	Region of Burkina Faso.
(Canindeyú Department) Canindeyú	14,667	Department of Paraguay.
Milne Bay Province	14,345	Province of Papua New Guinea.
(Namibia) Caprivi Region	14,528	Region of Namibia.
(Svalbard) Nordaustlandet	14,467	Island part of Svalbard, Norway.
(Indonesia) Sumbawa	14,386	Island part of Indonesia.
Lesser Antilles	14,364	Third major island chain in the Caribbean.
Connecticut	14,357	State of the United States.
(Turkey) Kahramanmaraş Province	14,327	Province of Turkey.
Lucayan Archipelago	14,308	One of three island chains in the Caribbean, consisting of the Bahamas and Turks and Caicos Islands.
(Turkey) Balıkesir Province	14,292	Province of Turkey.
(Cambodia) Mondulkiri Province	14,288	Largest province of Cambodia.
(Department of Lambayeque) Lambayeque Region	14,231	Region of Peru.
(Turkey) Afyonkarahisar Province	14,230	Province of Turkey.
(Algeria) Tébessa Province	14,227	Province of Algeria.
(Russia) October Revolution Island	14,204	Island in the Zevernaya Zemlya archipelago, part of Russia.
(Afghanistan) Bamiyan Province	14,175	Province of Afghanistan.
(Vietnam) Sơn La Province	14,174.40	Third largest province of Vietnam.
(Ivory Coast) Comoé District	14,173	District of Côte d'Ivoire.
Salto Department	14,163	Second largest department of Uruguay.
(Greece) East Macedonia and Thrace	14,157	Region of Greece.
(Indonesia) Flores	14,154	Island part of Indonesia.
(Ivory Coast) Moyen-Cavally	14,150	Region of Côte d'Ivoire.
Northern Ireland	14,139	Smallest constituent country of the United Kingdom.
(Cuba) Camagüey Province	14,134	Largest province of Cuba.
(Turkey) Yozgat Province	14,123	Province of Turkey.
(New Zealand) Hawke's Bay	14,111	Region of New Zealand.
(Israel) Southern District	14,107	Largest District of Israel.
Karachay–Cherkess Republic	14,100	Federal subject of Russia.
(Iran) Gilan Province	14,042	Province of Iran.
Thessaly	14,037	Region of Greece.
Lubusz Voivodeship (Lubuskie)	13,984	Voivodeship of Poland.
(Benin) Collines Department	13,931	Department of Benin.
Ivano-Frankivsk Oblast	13,928	Oblast of Ukraine.
Paysandú Department	13,922	Third largest department of Uruguay.
(North Korea) Ryanggang Province	13,888	Third largest province of North Korea.
The Bahamas	13,878	Country in the Caribbean.
(Cameroon) West Province	13,872	Smallest province of Cameroon.
(Yemen) Sana'a Governorate	13,850	Governorate of Yemen. Possibly divided in 2004, with territory going to a new governorate of unspecified area, Raymah Governorate.
Ternopil Oblast	13,823	Oblast of Ukraine.
(Cambodia) Kampong Thom	13,814	Second largest province of Cambodia.
Montenegro	13,812	Country in Europe.
(Turkey) Manisa Province	13,810	Province of Turkey.
Puerto Rico	13,790	Territory of the United States.
(New Zealand) Northland	13,789	Region of New Zealand.
(Cambodia) Preah Vihear Province	13,788	Third largest province of Cambodia.
Fukushima	13,783.74	Third largest prefecture of Japan.
(Isabela (province)) Isabela	13,778.76	Second largest province of the Philippines; includes the independent city of Santiago.
(Senegal) Kolda Region	13,718	Region of Senegal.
(Turkey) Eskişehir Province	13,652	Province of Turkey.
Cerro Largo Department	13,648	Department of Uruguay.
(Republic of the Congo) Kouilou	13,644	Department of the Republic of the Congo.
Trentino-Alto Adige/Südtirol	13,607	Region of Italy.
(Mauritania) Gorgol	13,600	Region of Mauritania.
Campania	13,595	Region of Italy.
(Flanders) Flemish Region	13,522	Region of Belgium.
Greater Tokyo Area	13,452	A metropolitan area in Japan, compromising the Kantō region.
Talas Region	13,406	Third smallest region of Kyrgyzstan.
(Turkey) Muğla province	13,338	Province of Turkey.
Naga	13,329	Self-administered zone in Myanmar.
(Togo) Centrale	13,317	Second largest region of Togo.
(Tanzania) Kilimanjaro	13,309	Region of Tanzania.
Lake Maracaibo	13,300	Lake in Venezuela
(Morocco) Doukkala-Abda	13,285	Region of Morocco.
(Yemen) Al Hudaydah Governorate	13,250	Governorate of Yemen. Possibly divided in 2004, with territory going to a new governorate of unspecified area, Raymah Governorate.
(Kenya) Central Province	13,191	Third smallest Province of Kenya.
(Vietnam) Đắk Lắk Province	13,139.20	Province of Vietnam.
(Canada) King William Island	13,111	Island in the Arctic Archipelago.
(Turkey) Kastamonu Province	13,108	Province of Turkey.
Nagano	13,104.29	Prefecture of Japan.
Central Denmark Region	13,095.80	Largest region of Denmark.
(Philippines) Negros	13,075	Third-largest island part of the Philippines.
Terengganu	12,955	State of Malaysia.
(Amambay Department) Amambay	12,933	Department of Paraguay.
(Surat Thani province) Surat Thani Province	12,892	Province of Thailand.
(Philippines) Samar	12,849	Island part of the Philippines.
(Turkey) Çorum Province	12,820	Province of Turkey.
(Turkey) Adana Province	12,788	Province of Turkey.
(Chai Nat province) Chainat Province	12,778	Province of Thailand.
Zakarpattia Oblast	12,777	Oblast of Ukraine.
Northwestern Region (Iceland)	12,737	Region of Iceland.
(Bangladesh) Sylhet Division	12,718	Second smallest division of Bangladesh.
(Cambodia) Pursat Province	12,692	Province of Cambodia.
(Lopburi province) Lopburi Province	12,681	Province of Thailand.
(Phayao province) Phayao Province	12,668	Province of Thailand.
(Yemen) Lahij Governorate	12,650	Governorate of Yemen.
(Tyrol (federal state)) Tyrol	12,648	Third largest state of Austria.
Niigata	12,584.10	Prefecture of Japan.
(North Korea) North P'yŏngan Province	12,575	Province of North Korea.
(Krabi province) Krabi Province	12,534	Province of Thailand.
Kabardino-Balkar Republic	12,500	Federal subject of Russia.
(Oman) Al Batinah Region	12,500	Second largest region of Oman.
(New Zealand) Marlborough	12,484	Unitary authority of New Zealand.
Napo Province	12,426	Province of Ecuador.
(Yemen) Sa'dah Governorate	12,370	Governorate of Yemen.
(Afghanistan) Takhar Province	12,333	Province of Afghanistan.
(Turkey) Malatya Province	12,313	Province of Turkey.
Silesian Voivodeship (Śląskie)	12,294	Third smallest Voivodeship of Poland.
(Republic of the Congo) Bouenza	12,266	Third smallest department of the Republic of the Congo.
(New Zealand) Bay of Plenty	12,231	Region of New Zealand.
Gorontalo	12,215	Province of Indonesia.
(Algeria) Batna Province	12,192	Province of Algeria.
(Philippines) Palawan	12,189	Island part of the Philippines.
Vanuatu	12,189	Country in Oceania.
(North Korea) North Hamgyŏng Province	12,189	Province of North Korea.
Falkland Islands	12,173	British Overseas Territory in the South Atlantic Ocean (near South America). Claimed by Argentina. Excludes South Georgia and the South Sandwich Islands.
(Paraguay) Ñeembucú	12,147	Department of Paraguay.
Region of Southern Denmark	12,132.21	Region of Denmark.
Lanao del Sur	12,051.85	Third largest province of the Philippines.
Île-de-France	12,012	Second smallest region of Metropolitan France.
(Philippines) Panay	12,011	Island part of the Philippines.
South Jeolla Province	11,987	Third largest province of South Korea.
Upper Austria	11,982	State of Austria.
(Turkey) İzmir Province	11,973	Province of Turkey.
Artigas Department	11,928	Department of Uruguay.
(China) Tianjin	11,917	Direct-controlled municipality of China.
(Turkey) Erzincan Province	11,903	Province of Turkey.
(Turkey) Kütahya Province	11,875	Province of Turkey.
(Turkey) Denizli Province	11,868	Province of Turkey.
(Senegal) Kaffrine Region	11,853	Region of Senegal.
Tupinambarana	11,850	Island in the Amazon.
Mon State	11,831	State of Myanmar (Myanmar has certain administrative divisions titled as Divisions, and others titled as States).
Sucre	11,800	State of Venezuela.
(Afghanistan) Jowzjan Province	11,798	Province of Afghanistan.
(Indonesia) Yos Sudarso Island	11,742	Island part of Indonesia.
(Togo) Kara	11,738	Region of Togo.
Udon Thani Province	11,730	Province of Thailand.
Enga Province	11,704	Province of Papua New Guinea.
(Chiang Mai province) Chiang Mai Province	11,678	Province of Thailand.
(Saudi Arabia) Jizan Province	11,671	Smallest province of Saudi Arabia.
Świętokrzyskie Voivodeship (Świętokrzyskie)	11,671	Second smallest Voivodeship of Poland.
Kayah State	11,670	Smallest state of Myanmar, second largest administrative entity (Myanmar has certain administrative divisions titled as Divisions, and others titled as States).
(Cuba) Matanzas Province	11,669	Second largest province of Cuba.
Durazno Department	11,643	Department of Uruguay.
(Pakistan) Azad Kashmir	11,639	Province of Pakistan.
Akita	11,637.54	Prefecture of Japan.
(North Korea) South P'yŏngan Province	11,577	Province of North Korea.
(Morocco) Tangier-Tétouan	11,570	Region of Morocco.
Nimba	11,551	Largest county of Liberia.
(Iran) Qom Province	11,526	Smallest province of Iran.
Caaguazú Department	11,474	Department of Paraguay.
(Nakhon Si Thammarat province) Nakhon Si Thammarat Province	11,472	Province of Thailand.
Nagorno-Karabakh	11,458	Independent non-sovereign republic in Azerbaijan.
(Burkina Faso) Centre-Sud	11,457	Region of Burkina Faso.
Querétaro	11,449	State of Mexico.
(Lamphun province) Lamphun Province	11,425	Province of Thailand.
(Indonesia) Bangka Island	11,413	Island part of Indonesia.
(Bangladesh) Barisal Division	11,394	Smallest division of Bangladesh.
(Turkey) Ağrı Province	11,376	Province of Turkey.
West Greece	11,350	region of Greece.
Murcia	11,313	Autonomous community of Spain.
(Georgia (country)) Kakheti	11,311	Largest region of Georgia.
Mérida	11,300	State of Venezuela.
(Canada) Ellef Ringnes Island	11,295	Island part of the Arctic Archipelago.
The Gambia	11,295	Country in Africa.
Puntarenas Province	11,266	Largest province of Costa Rica.
(Afghanistan) Samangan Province	11,262	Province of Afghanistan.
(Kuwait) Jahra	11,230	Governorate of Kuwait.
(Russia) Bolshevik Island	11,206	Island part of the Severnaya Zemlya archipelago, part of Russia.
Kalmar County	11,171	County of Sweden.
(Cambodia) Koh Kong Province	11,160	Province of Cambodia.
(Eastern Highlands (Papua New Guinea)) Eastern Highlands Province	11,157	Province of Papua New Guinea.
(Vietnam) Thanh Hóa Province	11,136.30	Province of Vietnam.
(Benin) Donga Department	11,126	Department of Benin.
Táchira	11,100	State of Venezuela.
(Cambodia) Kratie Province	11,094	Province of Cambodia.
(Cambodia) Stung Treng Province	11,092	Province of Cambodia.
Darien Province	11,091	Largest province of Panama.
(Cambodia) Battambang Province	11,072	Province of Cambodia.
(Canada) Bylot Island	11,067	Island part of the Arctic Archipelago.
Skåne County	11,027	County of Sweden.
Central Bohemian Region	11,014.97	Largest region of the Czech Republic.
Qatar	11,000	Country in Middle East.
Jamaica	10,991	Country in the Caribbean.
(Turkey) Bursa Province	10,963	Province of Turkey.
Sucre Department	10,917	District of Colombia.
Kosovo	10,887	Region in Europe; recognized by some countries as an independent country.
(Kanchanaburi province) Kanchanaburi Province	10,886	Province of Thailand.
(Cuba) Pinar del Río Province	10,860	Third largest province of Cuba.
(Phichit province) Phichit Province	10,816	Province of Thailand.
Abruzzo	10,794	Region of Italy.
Loja Province	10,792	Province of Ecuador.
(Cambodia) Ratanakiri Province	10,782	Province of Cambodia.
(Indonesia) Sumba	10,711	Island part of Indonesia.
(Namibia) Ohangwena Region	10,703	Region of Namibia.
(Laos) Salavan	10,691	Province of Laos.
Veraguas Province	10,677	Second largest province of Panama.
(Ivory Coast) Sud-Bandama	10,650	Region of Côte d'Ivoire.
Asturias	10,604	Autonomous community of Spain.
(North Korea) Kangwŏn Province	10,600	Third smallest province of North Korea.
Gifu	10,621.29	Prefecture of Japan.
(Philippines) Mindoro	10,572	Island part of the Philippines.
Östergötland County	10,562	County of Sweden.
(Zamora-Chinchipe Province) Zamora-Chinchipe	10,556	Province of Ecuador.
Rocha Department	10,551	Department of Uruguay.
Abyei	10,546	Area on the border between Sudan and South Sudan with "special administrative status".
(Fiji) Viti Levu	10,531	Largest island of Fiji.
South Gyeongsang Province	10,516	Province of South Korea.
(Russia) Kuril Islands	10,503.2	Archipelago part of Russia.
Bukidnon	10,498.59	Province of the Philippines.
Hela Province	10,498	Province of Papua New Guinea.
Tripura	10,492	State of India.
Grand Gedeh	10,484	Second largest county of Liberia.
Jönköping County	10,475	County of Sweden.
(Malawi) Mzimba	10,473	District of Malawi.
North Central	10,472	Province of Sri Lanka.
Lebanon	10,452	Country in Middle East.
(Vietnam) Quảng Nam Province	10,438.30	Province of Vietnam.
(Hawaii) Hawai'i (Big Island)	10,432	Island part of the U.S. state of Hawaii.
Florida Department	10,417	Department of Uruguay.
Navarre	10,391	Autonomous community of Spain.
(Nigeria) Rivers State	10,361	State of Nigeria.
Bangkok	10,323	Province of Thailand.
(Laos) Attapu	10,320	Province of Laos.
(Canada) Cape Breton Island	10,311	Island part of Canada.
(Mauritania) Guidimaka	10,300	Region of Mauritania.
(Cambodia) Siem Reap Province	10,299	Province of Cambodia.
(Portugal) Beja	10,225	District of Portugal.
(Canada) Haida Gwaii	10,180	Archipelago part of Canada.
(Syria) Hama	10,163	Governorate of Syria.
Guanacaste Province	10,141	Second largest province of Costa Rica.
Sinoe	10,137	Third largest county of Liberia.
Gyeonggi Province	10,135	Province of South Korea.
Beheira Governorate	10,130	Governorate of Egypt.
South Bohemian Region	10,056.79	Second largest region of the Czech Republic.
(Turkey) Bolu Province	10,037	Province of Turkey.
Lavalleja Department	10,016	Department of Uruguay.
(Yemen) Ta'izz Governorate	10,010	Governorate of Yemen.
Gironde	10,000	Largest continental department of France; second largest department of France.
Tonlé Sap	10,000	Lake in Cambodia.

== See also ==
Other divisions

- 0.1 to 1,000,000+ square kilometers
- 1,000,000+ square kilometers

Smaller divisions

- 200,000+ square kilometers • 100,000 to 1,000,000 square kilometers • 50,000 to 200,000 square kilometers • 20,000 to 50,000 square kilometers
- 5,000 to 20,000 square kilometers • 1,000 to 5,000 square kilometers • 0.1 to 1,000 square kilometers
- 500,000 to 1,000,000 square kilometers • 200,000 to 500,000 square kilometers • 100,000 to 200,000 square kilometers
- 50,000 to 100,000 square kilometers • 30,000 to 50,000 square kilometers • 20,000 to 30,000 square kilometers • 10,000 to 20,000 square kilometers
- 7,000 to 10,000 square kilometers • 5,000 to 7,000 square kilometers • 3,000 to 5,000 square kilometers • 1,000 to 3,000 square kilometers
- 250 to 1,000 square kilometers • 50 to 250 square kilometers • Under 50 square kilometers

Other

- List of countries and dependencies by area
- List of largest empires
- List of administrative divisions by country
- Category:Ranked lists of country subdivisions
