= Manuel Ortega, Emberá =

Manuel Ortega
- Corregimiento
- Location within Panama
- Country: Panama
- Comarca: Emberá
- District: Cémaco
- Established: November 8, 1983

Area
  - Land: 1,114.6 km^{2} (430.3 sq mi)

Population (2010)
  - Total: 1,783
  - Density: 1.6/km^{2} (4.1/sq mi)
- Population density calculated based on land area.
- Time zone: UTC−5 (EST)

Manuel Ortega is a corregimiento in Cémaco District, Comarca Emberá, Panama with a population of 4,017 as of 2010. It was created by Law 22 of November 8, 1983. Its population as of 1990 was 1,868; its population as of 2000 was 1,639.
