= Lajas Blancas =

- Corregimiento
- Location within Panama
- Country: Panama
- Comarca: Emberá
- District: Cémaco
- Established: November 8, 1983

Area
  - Land: 1,548.2 km^{2} (597.8 sq mi)

Population (2010)
  - Total: 3,735
  - Density: 2.4/km^{2} (6.2/sq mi)
- Population density calculated based on land area.
- Time zone: UTC−5 (EST)

Lajas Blancas is a corregimiento in Cémaco District, Comarca Emberá, Panama with a population of 9,390 as of 2010. It was created by Law 22 of November 8, 1983. Its population as of 1990 was 2,662; its population as of 2000 was 2,638.
