= Unión Chocó =

Panamanian indigenous territory

Coordinates: 8°06′07.7″N 77°36′21″W

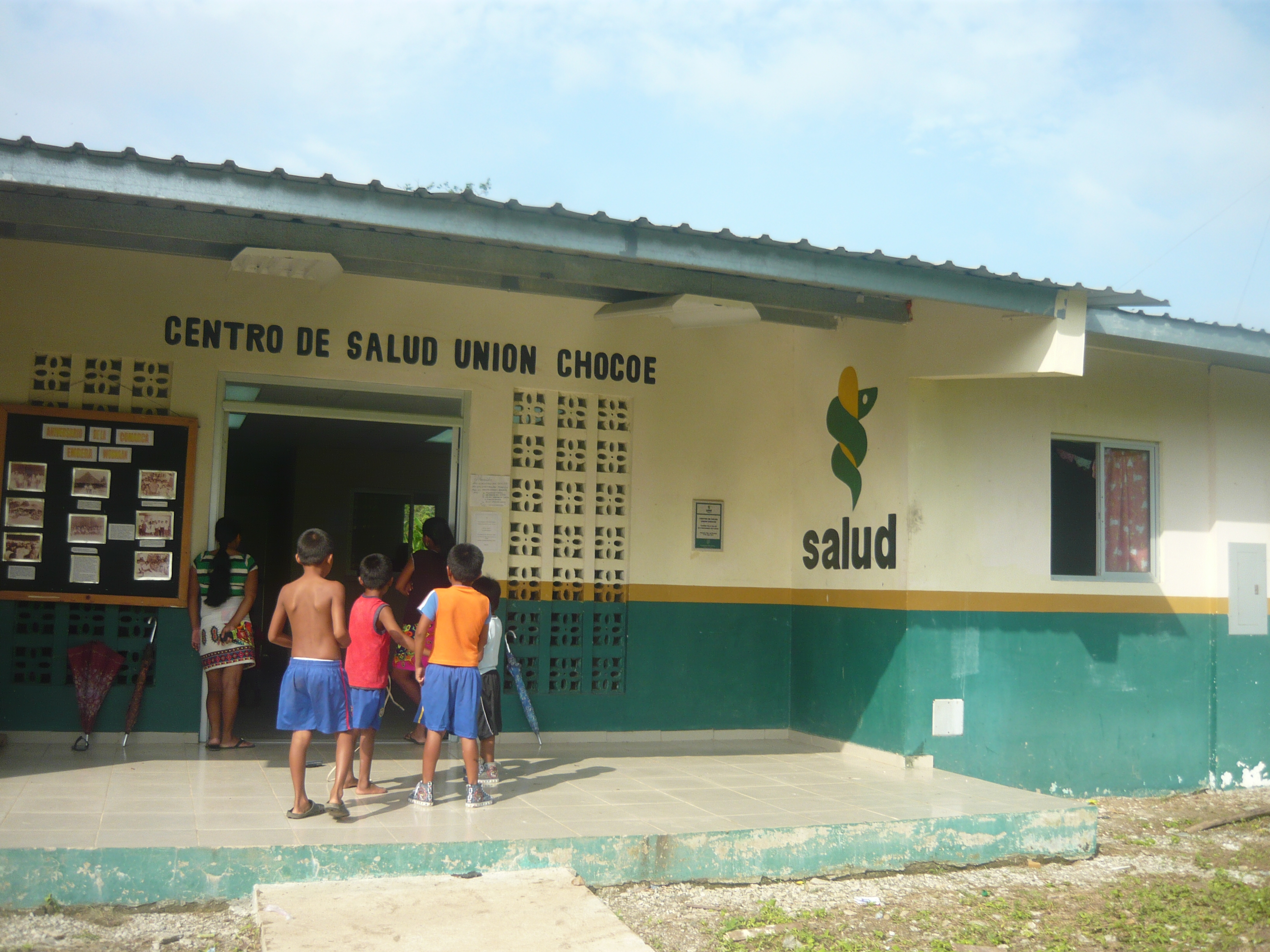
Health Center in Unión Chocó

Unión Chocó (Spanish pronunciation: [uˈnjon tʃoˈko]) is a town in the Panamanian indigenous territory (comarca indígena) of Emberá. It is located in, and is the capital of, Cémaco District. Omar Torrijos designated the land for the village in 1969, and the first houses were built in 1970.
