= Sambú District =

Sambú
- District
- Country: Panama
- Comarca indígena: Emberá-Wounaan
- Capital: Puerto Indio

Area
  - Total: 1,296.4 km^{2} (500.5 sq mi)

Population (2010)
  - Total: 2,286
  - Density: 1.763/km^{2} (4.567/sq mi)
- Time zone: UTC-5 (ETZ)

Sambú District is a district (distrito) of Comarca Emberá-Wounaan in Panama. The capital is Puerto Indio. The area of this district is 1296.4 sq. kilometers. It is on the western part of Comarca Emberá-Wounaan. The other side of the Comarca is Cémaco District.

== Administrative divisions ==
Sambú District is divided administratively into the following corregimientos:

- Río Sábalo
- Jingurudo

== See also ==
- Panama
- Districts of Panama
- Embera-Wounaan, indigenous peoples of Colombia and Panama
- Emberá languages, indigenous language family in Colombia and Panama
