= Cémaco District =

Cémaco
- District
- Country: Panama
- Comarca indígena: Emberá-Wounaan
- Capital: Unión Chocó

Area
  - Total: 3,097.5 km^{2} (1,196.0 sq mi)

Population (2010)
  - Total: 7,715
  - Density: 2.491/km^{2} (6.451/sq mi)
- Time zone: UTC-5 (ETZ)

Cémaco District is a district (distrito) of Comarca Emberá-Wounaan in Panama. The capital is Unión Chocó. The area of this district is 3097.5 sq. kilometers. It is on the eastern part of Comarca Emberá-Wounaan. The other side of the Comarca is Sambú District.

== Administrative divisions ==
Cémaco District is divided administratively into the following corregimientos:

- Cirilo Guainora
- Lajas Blancas
- Manuel Ortega

== See also ==
- Panama
- Districts of Panama
- Embera-Wounaan, indigenous peoples of Colombia and Panama
- Emberá languages, indigenous language family in Colombia and Panama
