= Jingurudó =

- Corregimiento
- Location within Panama
- Country: Panama
- Comarca: Emberá
- District: Sambú
- Established: November 8, 1983

Area
  - Land: 734.2 km^{2} (283.5 sq mi)

Population (2010)
  - Total: 486
  - Density: 0.7/km^{2} (1.8/sq mi)
- Population density calculated based on land area.
- Time zone: UTC−5 (EST)

Jingurudó is a corregimiento in Sambú District, Comarca Emberá, Panama with a population of 8,369 as of 2010. It was created by Law 22 of November 8, 1983. Its population as of 1990 was 533; its population as of 2000 was 537.
