= Emberá-Wounaan Comarca =

Indigenous region of Panama

Coordinates: 8°32′03″N 77°32′30″W

Emberá-Wounaan
- Comarca indígena
- Country: Panama
- Capital: Unión Chocó

Area
  - Total: 4,393.9 km^{2} (1,696.5 sq mi)

Population (2023)
  - Total: 12,358

GDP (PPP, constant 2015 values)
  - Year: 2023
  - Total: $100 million
  - Per capita: $4,500
- Time zone: UTC-5 (ETZ)
- ISO 3166 code: PA-EM

Emberá-Wounaan is a comarca indígena (indigenous territory) in eastern Panama. It was created by Law Number 22 on November 8, 1983, out of the former Chepigana and Pinogana districts of the Darién Province. Its capital is Unión Chocó, and it is notable for being composed of two non-contiguous sections. 12,358 people lived here in 2023, with over 95% of them being indigenous peoples.

== Administrative divisions ==
Emberá-Wounaan Comarca is sub-divided into 2 districts and 5 corregimientos. Cemaco is the eastern section, Sambú is the western one.

District	Corregimientos (Subdivisions)	Cabecera (Seat)	Inhabitants (2023)
Cémaco District	Cirilo Guaynora, Lajas Blancas, Manuel Ortega	Unión Chocó	9,547
Sambú District	Río Sábalo, Jingurudo	Puerto Indio	2,811

== See also ==
- Embera-Wounaan, indigenous peoples of Colombia and Panama
- Emberá languages, indigenous language family in Colombia and Panama
