= Reassertion of British sovereignty over the Falkland Islands =

Reassertion of British sovereignty over the Falkland Islands may refer to:

- Falklands Crisis (1770), a dispute over the Falkland Islands between Great Britain and Spain
- Reassertion of British sovereignty over the Falkland Islands (1833) the return of British naval forces to the Falkland Islands in 1833.
- Falklands War, the 1982 invasion of the Falkland Islands by Argentina and subsequent recapture by British forces

== See also ==
- Falklands Crisis (disambiguation)
- Falkland Islands sovereignty dispute
- South Georgia and the South Sandwich Islands sovereignty dispute
