= List of political and geographic subdivisions by total area in excess of 1,000,000 square kilometers =

This is one of a series of comprehensive lists of continents, countries, and first level administrative country subdivisions such as states, provinces, and territories, as well as certain political and geographic features of substantial area. References for the information provided in this table may be found in the individual articles on each body listed herein. Some divisions are listed twice, with one listing including territory that is excluded in the other for various reasons, including territorial disputes. There is intentional overlap among the lists in order to maximize ease of use.

Geographic entity	Area (km^{2})	Notes
Earth	510,065,284	Total surface area (70.8% water coverage and 29.2% land coverage).
Water	361,126,221	Total water coverage (70.8% of Earth's surface).
Pacific Ocean and adjacent seas	165,500,000	Largest ocean, including adjacent Celebes Sea, Coral Sea, East China Sea, Philippine Sea, Sea of Japan, South China Sea, Sulu Sea, Tasman Sea, and Yellow Sea.
Pacific Ocean excluding adjacent seas	155,557,000	Largest ocean.
Land	148,939,063	Total land coverage (29.2% of Earth's surface).
United Nations countries	147,000,000	All countries in the UN.
World Health Organization countries	134,697,385	All countries in the WHO.
World Trade Organization countries	117,870,000	All countries in the WTO.
Atlantic Ocean and adjacent seas	106,400,000	Second largest ocean, including adjacent Denmark Strait, Greenland Sea, Norwegian Sea, Barents Sea, Strait of Gibraltar and Mediterranean Sea, Black Sea, Caribbean Sea, Gulf of Mexico, Hudson Bay, Arctic Ocean, North Sea, Baltic Sea, and Celtic Sea.
Old World	84,980,532	The world known to its population before contact with the "New World" (the Americas).
Afro-Eurasia	84,211,532	Largest contiguous landmass.
Holarctic	77,000,000	Biogeographic realm that encompasses the majority of habitats found throughout the northern continents of the world.
Atlantic Ocean excluding adjacent seas	76,762,000	Second largest ocean.
Indian Ocean and adjacent seas	73,556,000	Third largest ocean, including Andaman Sea, Arabian Sea, Bay of Bengal, Great Australian Bight, Gulf of Aden, Gulf of Oman, Laccadive Sea, Mozambique Channel, Persian Gulf, Red Sea, and Strait of Malacca.
Indian Ocean excluding adjacent seas	68,556,000	Third largest ocean.
Palearctic	54,100,000	Largest of the eight biogeographic realms of the Earth.
Eurasia	53,990,000	Largest broadly connected contiguous landmass, comprising the traditional continents of Europe and Asia; sometimes considered a single continent, it covers 10.6% of Earth's surface (36.2% of the land area).
Asia Cooperation Dialogue	46,872,864	Supranational political entity.
Asia	44,579,000	Largest continent.
Americas	42,549,000	Large contiguous landmass viewed in some parts of the world as single continent.
Organization of American States	40,275,678	International organization contains most countries in the Americas.
Moon	37,930,000	Satellite in orbit around the Earth, excluded by treaty from national claims of ownership.
(China) (France) (Russia) (United Kingdom) (United States) Permanent members of the United Nations Security Council	37,411,898	The sovereign states to whom the UN Charter of 1945 grants permanent seats on the UN Security Council.
British Empire	35,500,000	Largest ever multi-country empire, as of its greatest extent in 1920.
Commonwealth of Nations	31,462,574	Supranational political entity.
Africa	30,221,532	Second largest continent.
African Union	29,797,500	Supranational political entity.
North Atlantic Treaty Organization (NATO)	26,552,127	Intergovernmental military alliance.
North America	24,490,000	Continent.
Mongol Empire	24,000,000	Multi-country empire, in 1309.
Far East	23,250,309	Geographic concept to call East Asia, Southeast Asia, and Russian Far East by European historically.
Warsaw Pact	23,140,845	Collective defense treaty led by Soviet Union.
Nearctic	22,900,000	One of the eight biogeographic realms of Earth.
Russian Empire	22,800,000	Multi-country empire, in 1895.
Sub-Saharan Africa	22,341,158	Region of Africa south of the Sahara Desert.
Soviet Union	22,402,200	Largest country in the world from 1922 until its dissolution in 1991.
Afrotropic	22,100,000	One of the eight biogeographic realms of the Earth.
Northern America	21,780,142	United Nations geoscheme region. Contains Canada, United States, Greenland, St. Pierre and Miquelon and Bermuda.
USMCA	21,578,137	Free trade agreement concluded between Canada, Mexico, and the United States.
South Atlantic Peace and Cooperation Zone	20,552,728	An organization between many South Atlantic nations.
Collective Security Treaty Organization (CSTO)	20,403,694	Intergovernmental military alliance in Eurasia.
Commonwealth of Independent States	20,368,759	A regional intergovernmental organization of nine members, plus two founding non-member, post-Soviet republics in Eurasia.
Southern Ocean	20,327,000	Ocean.
Eurasian Economic Union	20,229,248	Economic union of states located in Eastern Europe, Western Asia, and Central Asia.
Latin America	20,111,457	Region in the Americas where Romance languages are predominantly spoken.
Neotropic	19,000,000	One of the eight biogeographic realms of the Earth.
South America	17,840,000	Continent.
UNASUR/UNASUL	17,715,335	Supranational political entity including most nations of South America.
Russia	17,125,200	Largest country in the world; crosses Europe and Asia.
Mercosur	14,869,775	Officially called Southern Common Market.
Qing Empire, China	14,700,000	Multi-country empire in Asia under the Yongzheng Emperor (r. 1723–1735) and his son the Qianlong Emperor (r. 1735–1796).
Arctic sea ice (maximum extent, February 2015)	14,540,000	Oceanic feature.
Antarctica	14,200,000	Continent.
Arctic Ocean	14,056,000	Ocean.
Arable land (2012)	13,958,000	Land capable of being ploughed and used to grow crops.
Arab League	13,953,041	Supranational political entity.
(Spain) Spanish Empire	13,700,000	Multi-country empire, in 1810; size is approximate.
(Russia) Siberia	13,138,242	Traditional historic and geographic region of Russia.
East Asia	11,796,365	United Nations geoscheme region. Contains China, Mongolia, North Korea, South Korea and Japan.
(France) Second French colonial empire	11,500,000	Multi-country empire, in 1920.
Taiwan (ROC, including disputed areas)	11,420,000	Including disputed territories administered by Bhutan, Myanmar, Russia, Tajikistan, Afghanistan, Pakistan, Nepal, North Korea, the People's Republic of China, Mongolia, and India.
Umayyad (Arab Caliphate).	11,100,000	A caliphate, at its greatest territorial extent in 720.
Abbasid (Arab Caliphate).	11,100,000	A caliphate lasting from 750–1258, with its size in 750 shown.
Yuan Khanate, China	11,000,000	Multi-country empire in Asia under the Yuan Khanate 1279–1368. Measured at its maximum extent in 1310.
Tang Empire, China	10,760,000	Chinese Empire from 618–907. Size at greatest extent in 669.
Europe	10,180,000	Continent in classical antiquity.
Canada	9,984,670	Second largest country in the world; largest country in North America, and in the Western Hemisphere.
China (PRC, including disputed areas)	9,742,010	Largest country located entirely in Asia. Including PRC-administered area (Aksai Chin and Trans-Karakoram Tract, both territories claimed by India), South Tibet (controlled by India as the state of Arunachal Pradesh but claimed by China), and the disputed territories of Taiwan, Penghu, Kinmen, and the Matsu Islands which the Republic of China (Taiwan) has continued to govern after the PRC replaced it on the mainland; total of separate UN figures for Mainland China and the Special Administrative Regions of Hong Kong (1,099 km^{2}) and Macau (26 km^{2}).
China (PRC, non-disputed areas)	9,706,961	Largest country located entirely in Asia. Excluding disputed territories not under PRC administration, i.e. excluding South Tibet (Indian state of Arunachal Pradesh) and Republic of China (Taiwan); total of separate UN figures for Mainland China and the Special Administrative Regions of Hong Kong (1,099 km^{2}) and Macau (26 km^{2}).
United States	9,522,055	Country in North America. Includes the 50 states and District of Columbia with Indian Reservations. Includes inland water area of 78,797 mi^{2} (204,083 km^{2}) and Great Lakes water of 60,251 mi^{2} (156,049 km^{2}); excludes coastal water area of 42,225 mi^{2} (109,362 km^{2}) and territorial water area of 75,372 mi^{2} (195,213 km^{2})
Sahara	9,200,000	Largest hot desert in the world.
Australasian Mediterranean Sea	9,080,000	Mediterranean sea located in the area between Southeast Asia and Australasia.
Oceania	9,008,458	Geopolitical area including Australia and other islands and territories in the Pacific Ocean.
Xiongnu Empire	9,000,000	Size at greatest extent in 176 BC.
Brazil	8,514,877	Largest country in South America.
Empire of Brazil	8,337,218	19th-century state in South America.
The Indies	8,063,879	A European Colonial term for South and Southeast Asia.
Australia and New Zealand	8,010,655	United Nations geoscheme region. Contains Australia, New Zealand, Norfolk Island, Christmas Island, Cocos (Keeling) Island and Heard and McDonald Islands.
Australasia	7,955,717	A subdivision of Oceania.
Economic Cooperation Organization	7,937,197	Asian political and economic intergovernmental organization.
Contiguous United States	7,902,634	Includes the 48 contiguous states and District of Columbia, but excludes Alaska and Hawaii.
Northern Africa	7,880,374	United Nations geoscheme region. Contains Egypt, Sudan, Libya, Tunisia, Algeria, Morocco and Western Sahara.
Australia	7,686,848	Continent and country in Oceania. Includes Jervis Bay Territory (73 km^{2}), Cocos (Keeling) Islands (14 km^{2}), Christmas Island (135 km^{2}) and Lord Howe Island (56 km^{2}). Also includes the uninhabited Ashmore and Cartier Islands (5 km^{2}), Coral Sea Islands Territory (0,9 km^{2}), Heard and McDonald Islands (372 km^{2}) and Macquarie Island (231 km^{2}). Excludes claims on Antarctica (Australian Antarctic Territory, 6,119,818 km^{2}).
Australasian realm	7,600,000	One of the eight biogeographic realms of the Earth.
Mainland Australia	7,595,342	The biggest landmass of Australia, does not include Tasmania, any other islands part of the country, or territories.
Indomalaya	7,500,000	One of the eight biogeographic realms of the Earth.
Middle East	7,207,575	Transcontinental region in Afro-Eurasia.
Akhand Bharat	7,015,501	concept of a greater unified india
Eastern Africa	7,002,969	United Nations geoscheme region. Contains Ethiopia, Eritrea, Djibouti, Somalia, Uganda, Kenya, Tanzania, Rwanda, Burundi, Zambia, Zimbabwe, Mozambique, Malawi, Seychelles, Madagascar, Comoros and Mauritius.
Southern Asia	6,783,786	United Nations geoscheme region. Contains Iran, Afghanistan, Pakistan, India, Sri Lanka, Maldives, British Indian Ocean Territory, Nepal, Bhutan and Bangladesh.
Middle Africa	6,613,058	United Nations geoscheme region. Contains Chad, Cameroon, Central African Republic, Democratic Republic of Congo, Republic of Congo, Gabon, Equatorial Guinea, Sao Tome & Principe and Angola.
Ming China	6,500,000	Chinese Empire after the overthrow of the Yuan Mongol dynasty 1368–1644. Measured at its maximum extent in 1450.
Eastern Han Dynasty	6,500,000	The Chinese Empire lasting from 25 – 220 AD. Size at greatest extent in 100 AD.
Rashidun Caliphate	6,400,000	In 655.
Amazon basin	6,300,000	Drainage basin of Amazon River.
Europe (excluding European Russia)	6,220,000	Traditional region.
(Russia) Far Eastern Federal District	6,215,900	Federal district of Russia created May 2000.
Nordic Council	6,187,000	An official body for former inter-parliamentary between the Nordic countries.
West Africa	6,143,409	United Nations geoscheme region. Contains Mauritania, Mali, Niger, Cabo Verde, Guinea-Bissau, Guinea, Sierra Leone, Liberia, Cote d'Ivoire, Burkina Faso, Ghana, Togo, Benin and Nigeria.
Khanate of the Golden Horde	6,000,000	Multi-country empire in Europe and Asia; a Khanate remnant of the Mongol Empire, lasting from 1240–1502. Size is approximate at its apex in 1310.
Western Han Dynasty	6,000,000	The Chinese Empire lasting from 206 BC – 9 AD. Size at greatest extent in 50 BC.
First Turkic Khaganate	6,000,000	Size at greatest extent in 557.
Australian Antarctic Territory	5,896,500	Australian claim to Antarctica.
Eastern Europe	5,726,128	United Nations geoscheme region. Contains European Russia, Ukraine, Moldova, Romania, Bulgaria, Poland, Czechia, Slovakia and Hungary.
Philippine Sea	5,695,000	Marginal sea of the Western Pacific Ocean east of the Philippine archipelago.
Amazon rainforest	5,500,000	The largest rainforest in the world.
Achaemenid Empire	5,500,000	An empire in Iran and other countries from Greece and Egypt to Uzbekistan from 550–330 BC. Size at greatest extent in 500 BC.
(Portugal) Portuguese Empire	5,500,000	The Portuguese overseas empire at its greatest extent in 1820.
Western China	5,478,097	A geographic concept of the region of western inland China.
Ottoman Empire	5,200,000	Early modern empire centered in Turkey at its greatest extent in 1683.
Macedonia (ancient kingdom)	5,200,000	Ancient empire centered in Macedonia at its greatest extent in 323 BC under Alexander the Great.
South Asian Association for Regional Cooperation (SAARC)	5,130,746	Supranational political entity.
(Russia) Siberian Federal District	5,114,800	Federal district of Russia created May 2000, distinct from but also included in the historical region of the same name.
Arctic sea ice minimum extent (September 2014)	5,020,000	
Brazilian Highlands	5,000,000	Largest plateau in the world by area.
Roman Empire	5,000,000	Multi-country empire in antiquity, under Trajan in AD 117.
Maurya Empire	5,000,000	Indian empire lasted from 321–185 BC, size is calculated to be the greatest extent reached in 250 BC.
British Raj	4,903,312	Unofficially called Indian Empire.
First Mexican Empire	4,874,683	First independent government of Mexico.
Western United States	4,851,700	Region of the United States. Contains the states of California, Oregon, Washington, Idaho, Wyoming, Montana, Colorado, Nevada, Utah, Arizona, New Mexico, Alaska and Hawaii.
Coral Sea	4,791,000	Marginal sea of the South Pacific off the northeast coast of Australia.
Tibetan Empire	4,600,000	The Tibetan state lasting from 650–842, measured at its apex in 800.
First Mexican Republic	4,536,710	North American country existed from 1824 to 1835.
Association of Southeast Asian Nations (ASEAN)	4,465,501	Supranational political entity containing Myanmar, Thailand, Cambodia, Laos, Vietnam, Malaysia, Singapore, Brunei, Philippines, Indonesia and East Timor.
Southeast Asia	4,465,501	United Nations geoscheme region, containing all ASEAN members referenced elsewhere on this list.
Timurid Empire	4,400,000	A Persian Middle Eastern empire, rising after the Mongol Empire lasting from 1355–1740, measured at its apex in 1405.
Indian subcontinent	4,400,000	A peninsular region in south-central Asia, delineated by the Himalayas in the north.
European Union	4,325,675	Supranational political entity.
Organization of Turkic States	4,242,362	Intergovernmental organization compromising Hungary and all internationally recognized Turkic states but Turkmenistan.
Fatimid Caliphate	4,100,000	Western remnant of the Umayyad Caliphate lasting from 909–1171, estimated at its greatest extent in 969.
Central Asia	4,004,451	United Nations geoscheme region. Contains Kazakhstan, Uzbekistan, Turkmenistan, Kyrgyzstan and Tajikistan.
Mughal Empire	4,000,000	An Islamic Empire in India in the early modern period. Size at greatest extent in 1690.
Eastern Turkic Khaganate	4,000,000	Eastern remnant of the Göktürk Khaganate. Size at greatest extent in 624.
Hephthalite Empire	4,000,000	Size at greatest extent in 470.
Hunnic Empire	4,000,000	Size at greatest extent in 441.
European Russia	3,960,000	Traditional historic and geographic region of Russia.
Seleucid Empire	3,900,000	A Greek/Persian Middle Eastern empire lasting from 312–63 BC, was the successor state to the Achaemenid Empire. Measured at its apex in 301 BC.
Rupert's Land	3,900,000	An area of British North America, under the jurisdiction of the Hudson's Bay Company.
Great Seljuq Empire	3,900,000	Turkish empire in the Middle East, was the European antagonist during the Crusades. Lasted from 1037–1194, size is calculated to be the greatest extent reached in 1080.
Arabian Sea	3,862,000	Northern Indian Ocean.
(Brazil) North Region	3,853,676.9	One of the five official regions according to the IBGE. Includes the states of Acre, Amapá, Amazonas, Pará, Rondônia, Roraima, and Tocantins.
Andean Community	3,809,100	A free trade area with the objective of creating a customs union comprising the South American countries.
(Kingdom of Italy) Italian Empire	3,798,000	Includes Italian colonies. Size in 1938.
Ilkhanate	3,750,000	A Khanate remnant of the Mongol Empire, lasting from 1256–1355, measured at its apex in 1310.
Argentina (including claims)	3,748,072	Second largest country in South America. Includes claims over the Falkland Islands, South Georgia and South Sandwich Islands, and Argentine Antarctica, which are not under Argentine de facto control.
Dzungar Khanate	3,600,000	Size in 1650.
Khwarazmian dynasty	3,600,000	Size at greatest extent in 1218.
Northern Canada	3,535,263	Vast northernmost region of Canada.
Sassanid Empire	3,500,000	Successor state to the Parthian Empire in the Middle East and Iran, the last Iranian empire before the rise of Islam, lasting from 224–651, size estimated at its apex in 550.
Zealandia	3,500,000	Largest microcontinent (size is approximate).
Sargasso Sea	3,500,000	Region of the Atlantic Ocean bounded by four currents forming an ocean gyre.
South China Sea	3,500,000	Marginal sea occurring in part of the Pacific Ocean south of China, and bordered predominately by Vietnam, Malaysia, Indonesia, Brunei, and the Philippines.
Gupta Empire	3,500,000	One of the Indian Middle Kingdoms lasting from 320–560, size is estimated at the apex in 400.
Chagatai Khanate	3,500,000	A Khanate remnant of the Mongol Empire, measured at its apex in 1310 and 1350.
Western Turkic Khaganate	3,500,000	Western remnant of the Göktürk Khaganate. Size at greatest extent in 630.
(France) First French colonial empire	3,400,000	Size at greatest extent in 1670.
Ghaznavid Empire	3,400,000	Size at greatest extent in 1029.
India (including disputed areas)	3,287,263	Third largest country in Asia (after Russia and China). Includes all disputed territories.
Delhi Sultanate	3,200,000	Size at greatest extent in 1312.
(German Empire) German Colonial Empire	3,199,015	Size at greatest extent in 1912.
Arabian Peninsula	3,189,612	A geographic region of the Middle East.
India (non-disputed areas)	3,166,414	Third largest country in Asia (after Russia and China). Excludes non-Indian-administered disputed territories (Aksai Chin and Trans-Karakoram Tract in China; Azad Kashmir and Gilgit–Baltistan in Pakistan). Includes all Indian-administered territories, which contains the China-claimed South Tibet, administered by India as part of Arunachal Pradesh.
Northwest China	3,107,701	A statistical region of China.
Sakha Republic	3,103,200	Largest federal subject of Russia.
Song dynasty	3,100,000	The Chinese Empire lasting from 960–1279. Size at greatest extent in 980.
Uyghur Khaganate	3,100,000	Size at greatest extent in 800.
Western Jin Dynasty	3,100,000	Size at greatest extent in 280.
Peru-Bolivian Confederation	3,054,612	A loose confederation existing between 1836 and 1839 in South America.
Khazar Khanate	3,000,000	Size at greatest extent in 850.
Sui dynasty	3,000,000	Size at greatest extent in 589.
Malay Archipelago	2,870,000	Archipelago between mainland Indochina and Australia.
Paratethys sea	2,800,000	largest inland sea/Lake
Byzantine Empire	2,800,000	Remnant of the Roman Empire at its greatest extent in 450.
Parthian Empire	2,800,000	A Persian Middle Eastern empire lasting from 248 BC – 226 AD, was the successor state to the Greek Seleucid Empire and a major antagonist to the Roman Empire. Measured at its apex circa 0 AD.
Medes (Median Empire)	2,800,000	An early Persian Middle Eastern empire lasting from 625–549 BC. Size at greatest extent in 585 BC.
Eastern Jin Dynasty	2,800,000	Size at greatest extent in 347.
Rouran Khaganate	2,800,000	Size in 405.
Weddell Sea	2,800,000	Part of the Southern Ocean.
Eastern Canada	2,783,400	East part of Canada contains six provinces.
Argentina (excluding disputed claims)	2,780,400	Second largest country in South America. Does not include claims over Falkland Islands, South Georgia and the South Sandwich Islands, nor Argentine Antarctica (969,000 km^{2}).
Caribbean Sea	2,754,000	Body of water between North and South America.
Kazakhstan	2,724,900	In Asia; largest landlocked country in the world.
Western Canada	2,703,159	West part of Canada contains four provinces.
Australian Desert	2,700,000	Deserts in Australian mainland.
(Norway) Queen Maud Land	2,700,000	Norwegian Antarctic claim.
Western Asia	2,680,579	United Nations geoscheme region. Contains Turkey, Cyprus, Syria, Lebanon, Israel, Palestine, Jordan, Saudi Arabia, Yemen, Oman, United Arab Emirates, Qatar, Bahrain, Kuwait, Iraq, Georgia, Armenia and Azerbaijan.
Gulf Cooperation Council	2,673,108	Regional intergovernmental political and economic union.
Southern Africa	2,672,831	United Nations geoscheme region. Contains South Africa, Lesotho, Swaziland, Namibia and Botswana.
(United States) Pacific states	2,615,077	Division of the United States. Contains the states of California, Oregon, Washington, Alaska and Hawaii.
Bay of Bengal	2,600,000	Northeastern part of the Indian Ocean.
Western Australia	2,525,500	Largest state of Australia.
Gran Colombia	2,519,954	Republic of Colombia from 1819 to 1831
Former Sudan	2,505,813	Sudan before South Sudan split out of it. Formerly the largest country in Africa.
Mediterranean Sea	2,500,000	Body of water separating Europe and Africa.
Tibetan Plateau	2,500,000	Vast elevated plateau in South Asia, Central Asia and East Asia, the Roof of the World.
Greco-Bactrian Kingdom	2,500,000	A successor state to the Seleucid Empire in what is now Afghanistan and Uzbekistan lasting from 256–125 BC. Size at greatest extent in 184 BC.
Grand Duchy of Moscow	2,500,000	A precursor to the Russian Empire, lasting from 1263–1547. Size in 1505.
Central America	2,486,445	United Nations geoscheme region. Contains Mexico, Belize, Guatemala, El Salvador, Honduras, Nicaragua, Costa Rica and Panama.
East African Community	2,467,202	Intergovernmental organisation composed of six countries in the African Great Lakes region.
Southern United States	2,383,946	Region of the United States. Contains the states of Texas, Louisiana, Arkansas, Oklahoma, Mississippi, Florida, Alabama, Georgia, Tennessee, South Carolina, North Carolina, Kentucky, Virginia, West Virginia, Maryland and Delaware.
Algeria	2,381,741	Largest country in Africa.
Southwest China	2,365,900	A statistical region of China.
Gulf of Guinea	2,350,000	Northeasternmost part of the tropical Atlantic Ocean.
Democratic Republic of the Congo	2,344,858	Second largest country in Africa.
Krasnoyarsk Krai	2,339,700	Federal subject of Russia.
Arabian Desert	2,330,000	Vast desert wilderness in Western Asia.
Qin dynasty	2,300,000	First dynasty of Imperial China.
Central Canada	2,265,154	Sub-region of Eastern Canada.
(United States) Mountain states	2,236,623	Division of the United States. Contains the states of Idaho, Wyoming, Montana, Colorado, Nevada, Utah, Arizona and New Mexico.
Kingdom of Denmark	2,220,093	Including Denmark, Greenland and Faroe Islands.
Greenland	2,175,600	An autonomous country, part of the Kingdom of Denmark.
Saudi Arabia	2,149,690	Largest country in Middle East.
(United States) Louisiana Purchase	2,147,000	Area of the United States purchased from France in 1803, which now comprises all or part of fifteen U.S. states.
Midwestern United States	2,128,257	Region of the United States. Contains the states of Michigan, Wisconsin, Minnesota, Iowa, Missouri, Illinois, Indiana, Ohio, North Dakota, South Dakota, Nebraska and Kansas.
(France) First French Empire	2,100,000	Multi-country empire under Emperor Napoleon I of France, from 1804–1814; size at greatest extent in 1813.
Mainland Southeast Asia (Indochina)	2,071,552	Continental portion of Southeast Asia, compromising Cambodia, Laos, peninsular portion of Malaysia, Myanmar, Singapore, Thailand and Vietnam.
Chile (Including Territorial Claims)	2,007,208	Includes Easter Island (Isla de Pascua; Rapa Nui), Isla Sala y Gómez and Antarctica (1,250,000 km^{2}).
Western Roman Empire	2,000,000	Comprises the western provinces of the Roman Empire.
Inca Empire	2,000,000	Incan Empire along Andean coast in South America lasting from 1438–1533.
Confederate States of America	1,995,392	Unrecognized country in North America, 1861–1865.
Empire of Japan	1,984,000	Size in 1938.
Mexico	1,958,201	Third largest country in North America; also third largest country in Latin America.
Nunavut	1,936,113	Largest sub-federal jurisdiction of Canada, largest territory of Canada.
Indonesia	1,904,569	In Southeast Asia; largest and most populous country situated only on islands.
Sudan	1,886,068	Third largest country in Africa.
Horn of Africa	1,882,757	Peninsula in Eastern Africa.
Northern Europe	1,811,151	United Nations geoscheme region. Contains Norway (including Jan Mayen and Svalbard), Sweden, Finland, Denmark (including Faroe Islands), Iceland, Estonia, Latvia, Lithuania, United Kingdom and Ireland.
(British Empire) Thirteen Colonies	1,876,972	Found by taking the size of the United States less the size of its acquired territories.
(Russia) Urals Federal District	1,788,900	Federal district of Russia created May 2000.
East Indies	1,784,398	A European Colonial term for Maritime Southeast Asia, including Malaysia, East Timor, the Philippines, Brunei, Singapore and Indonesia (less its territory on New Guinea).
Libya	1,759,540	Country in northern Africa.
Queensland	1,727,300	State of Australia.
Alaska	1,717,856	Largest state of the United States.
Sinkiang	1,711,931	Former province of Xinjiang, a province of the Republic of China, also spelled Sinkiang Province.
British Antarctic Territory	1,709,400	British claim to Antarctica
Guiana Island	1,700,000	Region in South America.
(Russia) Northwestern Federal District	1,677,900	Federal district of Russia created May 2000.
(China) Xinjiang	1,660,000	Largest autonomous region of China.
Iran	1,648,195	Second largest country in Middle East.
(Brazil) Central-West Region	1,612,077.2	One of the five official regions according to the IBGE. Includes the states of Distrito Federal, Goiás, Mato Grosso and Mato Grosso do Sul.
Four Oirat	1,600,000	Area in 17th century.
Amazonas	1,570,746	Largest state of Brazil.
Mongolia	1,564,116	Country located between China and Russia.
(Brazil) Northeast Region	1,558,196	One of the five official regions according to the IBGE. Includes the states of Maranhão, Piauí, Ceará, Rio Grande do Norte, Paraíba, Pernambuco, Alagoas, Sergipe and Bahia, along with the Fernando de Noronha archipelago.
North China (including eastern Inner Mongolia)	1,556,061	A statistical region of China.
(Indonesia) Greater Sunda Islands	1,510,709	Four large islands in the Indonesian archipelago. Includes Borneo, Sumatra, Sulawesi and Java.
Qara Khitai	1,500,000	Also known as the Western Liao.
Gulf of Mexico	1,500,000	Body of water in North America.
Canadian Arctic Archipelago	1,407,770	An archipelago of over 36,000 islands in the Arctic Ocean, all part of Canada.
Khoshut Khanate	1,400,000	An Oirat khanate based in the Tibetan Plateau.
Neo-Assyrian Empire	1,400,000	An ancient Middle Eastern empire along the Fertile Crescent, lasting from 934–609 BC.
Quebec	1,365,128	Second largest sub-federal jurisdiction of Canada, largest province of Canada.
Mexican Cession	1,360,000	A large area of the First Mexican Empire, which was lost after the Mexican–American War in 1848 to the US.
(United States) West North Central states	1,347,716	Division of the United States. Contains the states of Minnesota, Iowa, Missouri, North Dakota, South Dakota, Nebraska and Kansas.
Northern Territory	1,346,200	Territory of Australia.
Kalmar Union	1,322,358	A medieval and early modern Kingdom in Scandinavia consisting of Denmark, Iceland, Norway and most of modern Sweden and Finland, lasting from 1397–1523. Size does not include the colonial territories in Greenland.
Westarctica	1,320,000	A micronation in Antarctica.
Republic of New Granada	1,331,250	Modern day Colombia from 1831 to 1858
Southern Europe	1,316,300.44	United Nations geoscheme region. Contains Spain, Portugal, Andorra, Italy, Malta, San Marino, Vatican City, Slovenia, Croatia, Bosnia and Herzegovina, Serbia, Montenegro, Kosovo, Albania, Macedonia and Greece.
Gobi Desert	1,295,000	Desert or brushland region in East Asia.
Peru	1,285,216	Country in South America.
Chad	1,284,000	Country in Africa.
Niger	1,267,000	Country in Africa.
(Magallanes y la Antártica Chilena Region) Chilean Antarctic Territory	1,250,258	Chilean claim to Antarctica
East China Sea	1,249,000	Marginal sea east of China, also bordered by South Korea and Japan.
Pará	1,247,690	Second largest state of Brazil.
Angola	1,246,700	Country in Africa.
Mali	1,240,192	Country in Africa.
Hudson Bay	1,230,000	Body of water in northeastern Canada.
(China) Tibet Autonomous Region	1,228,400	Autonomous region of China.
Ethiopian Empire (Abyssinia)	1,221,900	An African Empire lasting from 980 BC – 1974 AD.
South Africa	1,221,148	Country in Africa. Area of mainland South Africa is 1,220,813 km^{2} (471,359 sq mi), added to which are the Prince Edward Islands – Marion Island, 290 km^{2}, and Prince Edward Island, 45 km^{2}.
Central Europe	1,200,790	United Nations geoscheme region. Contains France, Monaco, Netherlands, Belgium, Luxembourg, Germany, Switzerland, Liechtenstein and Austria.
Carolingian Empire	1,200,000	The maximum extent of Frankish Kingdom under Charlemagne in 814. An immediate precursor to the Holy Roman Empire.
Srivijaya	1,200,000	Buddhist thalassocratic empire based on the island of Sumatra, Indonesia.
Northwest Territories	1,183,085	Territory of Canada.
(China) Inner Mongolia	1,183,000	Autonomous region of China.
Polish–Lithuanian Commonwealth	1,153,465	The maximum extent of bi-confederation of Poland and Lithuania, in 1650.
(United States) West South Central States	1,150,090	Division of the United States. Contains the states of Arkansas, Louisiana, Oklahoma and Texas.
Colombia	1,138,914	Country in South America. Colombian census figure is 1,141,748 which includes three special districts and San Andrés and Providencia islands (52 km^{2}).
Ethiopia	1,104,300	Country in Africa.
Bolivia	1,098,581	Country in South America.
Melanesia	1,040,672	One of the Island subdivisions of Oceania.
French East India Company	1,040,549	The maximum extent of French Colonial rule in India in 1754. Estimated by adding together the areas of the States and territories of India which correspond approximately to the French East India Company.
(Russia) Volga Federal District	1,038,000	Federal district of Russia created May 2000.
Mauritania	1,025,520	Country in Africa.
Tarim Basin	1,020,000	Endorheic basin in Northwest China.
South Central China	1,014,354	A statistical region of China.
Republic of Texas	1,007,935	Briefly independent breakaway state from the First Mexican Empire in 1835, later annexed in 1846 by the United States.
Tierra del Fuego (including claims)	1,002,445	If taken to include claims to the Falkland Islands, South Georgia and South Sandwich Islands, and Argentine Antarctica (none of which are controlled by Argentina). Argentina's largest province, if these claims are included.
New Kingdom of Egypt	1,000,000	The final imperial phase of dynastic Egypt, lasting from 1570–1070 BC.
Khmer Empire	1,000,000	Hindu/Buddhist empire in Southeast Asia.
Oceanian realm	1,000,000	One of the eight biogeographic realms of the Earth.

== See also ==
Other divisions

- 0.1 to 1,000,000+ square kilometers
- 1,000,000+ square kilometers

Smaller divisions

- 200,000+ square kilometers • 100,000 to 1,000,000 square kilometers • 50,000 to 200,000 square kilometers • 20,000 to 50,000 square kilometers
- 5,000 to 20,000 square kilometers • 1,000 to 5,000 square kilometers • 0.1 to 1,000 square kilometers
- 500,000 to 1,000,000 square kilometers • 200,000 to 500,000 square kilometers • 100,000 to 200,000 square kilometers
- 50,000 to 100,000 square kilometers • 30,000 to 50,000 square kilometers • 20,000 to 30,000 square kilometers • 10,000 to 20,000 square kilometers
- 7,000 to 10,000 square kilometers • 5,000 to 7,000 square kilometers • 3,000 to 5,000 square kilometers • 1,000 to 3,000 square kilometers
- 250 to 1,000 square kilometers • 50 to 250 square kilometers • Under 50 square kilometers

Other

- List of countries and dependencies by area
- List of largest empires
- List of administrative divisions by country
- Category:Ranked lists of country subdivisions
