= List of political and geographic subdivisions by total area in excess of 200,000 square kilometers =

This is one of a series of comprehensive lists of continents, countries, and first level administrative country subdivisions such as states, provinces, and territories, as well as certain political and geographic features of substantial area. References for the information provided in this table may be found in the individual articles on each body listed herein. Some divisions are listed twice, with one listing including territory that is excluded in the other for various reasons, including territorial disputes. There is intentional overlap among the lists in order to maximize ease of use.

Geographic entity	Area (km^{2})	Notes
Earth	510,065,284	Total surface area (70.8% water coverage and 29.2% land coverage).
Water	361,126,221	Total water coverage (70.8% of Earth's surface).
Pacific Ocean and adjacent seas	165,500,000	Largest ocean, including adjacent Celebes Sea, Coral Sea, East China Sea, Philippine Sea, Sea of Japan, South China Sea, Sulu Sea, Tasman Sea, and Yellow Sea.
Pacific Ocean excluding adjacent seas	155,557,000	Largest ocean.
Land	148,939,063	Total land coverage (29.2% of Earth's surface).
United Nations countries	147,000,000	All countries in the UN.
World Health Organization countries	134,697,385	All countries in the WHO.
World Trade Organization countries	117,870,000	All countries in the WTO.
Atlantic Ocean and adjacent seas	106,400,000	Second largest ocean, including adjacent Denmark Strait, Greenland Sea, Norwegian Sea, Barents Sea, Strait of Gibraltar and Mediterranean Sea, Black Sea, Caribbean Sea, Gulf of Mexico, Hudson Bay, Arctic Ocean, North Sea, Baltic Sea, and Celtic Sea.
Old World	84,980,532	The world known to its population before contact with the "New World" (the Americas).
Afro-Eurasia	84,211,532	Largest contiguous landmass.
Holarctic	77,000,000	Biogeographic realm that encompasses the majority of habitats found throughout the northern continents of the world.
Atlantic Ocean excluding adjacent seas	76,762,000	Second largest ocean.
Indian Ocean and adjacent seas	73,556,000	Third largest ocean, including Andaman Sea, Arabian Sea, Bay of Bengal, Great Australian Bight, Gulf of Aden, Gulf of Oman, Laccadive Sea, Mozambique Channel, Persian Gulf, Red Sea, and Strait of Malacca.
Indian Ocean excluding adjacent seas	68,556,000	Third largest ocean.
Palearctic	54,100,000	Largest of the eight biogeographic realms of the Earth.
Eurasia	53,990,000	Largest broadly connected contiguous landmass, comprising the traditional continents of Europe and Asia; sometimes considered a single continent, it covers 10.6% of Earth's surface (36.2% of the land area).
Asia Cooperation Dialogue	46,872,864	Supranational political entity.
Asia	44,579,000	Largest continent.
Americas	42,549,000	Large contiguous landmass viewed in some parts of the world as single continent.
Organization of American States	40,275,678	International organization contains most countries in the Americas.
Moon	37,930,000	Satellite in orbit around the Earth, excluded by treaty from national claims of ownership.
(China) (France) (Russia) (United Kingdom) (United States) Permanent members of the United Nations Security Council	37,411,898	The sovereign states to whom the UN Charter of 1945 grants permanent seats on the UN Security Council.
British Empire	35,500,000	Largest ever multi-country empire, as of its greatest extent in 1920.
Commonwealth of Nations	31,462,574	Supranational political entity.
Africa	30,221,532	Second largest continent.
African Union	29,797,500	Supranational political entity.
North Atlantic Treaty Organization (NATO)	26,552,127	Intergovernmental military alliance.
North America	24,490,000	Continent.
Mongol Empire	24,000,000	Multi-country empire, in 1309.
Far East	23,250,309	Geographic concept to call East Asia, Southeast Asia, and Russian Far East by European historically.
Warsaw Pact	23,140,845	Collective defense treaty led by Soviet Union.
Nearctic	22,900,000	One of the eight biogeographic realms of Earth.
Russian Empire	22,800,000	Multi-country empire, in 1895.
Sub-Saharan Africa	22,341,158	Region of Africa south of the Sahara Desert.
Soviet Union	22,402,200	Largest country in the world from 1922 until its dissolution in 1991.
Afrotropic	22,100,000	One of the eight biogeographic realms of the Earth.
Northern America	21,780,142	United Nations geoscheme region. Contains Canada, United States, Greenland, St. Pierre and Miquelon and Bermuda.
USMCA	21,578,137	Free trade agreement concluded between Canada, Mexico, and the United States.
South Atlantic Peace and Cooperation Zone	20,552,728	An organization between many South Atlantic nations.
Collective Security Treaty Organization (CSTO)	20,403,694	Intergovernmental military alliance in Eurasia.
Commonwealth of Independent States	20,368,759	A regional intergovernmental organization of nine members, plus two founding non-member, post-Soviet republics in Eurasia.
Southern Ocean	20,327,000	Ocean.
Eurasian Economic Union	20,229,248	Economic union of states located in Eastern Europe, Western Asia, and Central Asia.
Latin America	20,111,457	Region in the Americas where Romance languages are predominantly spoken.
Neotropic	19,000,000	One of the eight biogeographic realms of the Earth.
South America	17,840,000	Continent.
UNASUR/UNASUL	17,715,335	Supranational political entity including most nations of South America.
Russia	17,125,200	Largest country in the world; crosses Europe and Asia.
Mercosur	14,869,775	Officially called Southern Common Market.
Qing Empire, China	14,700,000	Multi-country empire in Asia under the Yongzheng Emperor (r. 1723–1735) and his son the Qianlong Emperor (r. 1735–1796).
Arctic sea ice (maximum extent, February 2015)	14,540,000	Oceanic feature.
Antarctica	14,200,000	Continent.
Arctic Ocean	14,056,000	Ocean.
Arable land (2012)	13,958,000	Land capable of being ploughed and used to grow crops.
Arab League	13,953,041	Supranational political entity.
(Spain) Spanish Empire	13,700,000	Multi-country empire, in 1810; size is approximate.
(Russia) Siberia	13,138,242	Traditional historic and geographic region of Russia.
East Asia	11,796,365	United Nations geoscheme region. Contains China, Mongolia, North Korea, South Korea and Japan.
(France) Second French colonial empire	11,500,000	Multi-country empire, in 1920.
Taiwan (ROC, including disputed areas)	11,420,000	Including disputed territories administered by Bhutan, Myanmar, Russia, Tajikistan, Afghanistan, Pakistan, Nepal, North Korea, the People's Republic of China, Mongolia, and India.
Umayyad (Arab Caliphate).	11,100,000	A caliphate, at its greatest territorial extent in 720.
Abbasid (Arab Caliphate).	11,100,000	A caliphate lasting from 750–1258, with its size in 750 shown.
Yuan Khanate, China	11,000,000	Multi-country empire in Asia under the Yuan Khanate 1279–1368. Measured at its maximum extent in 1310.
Tang Empire, China	10,760,000	Chinese Empire from 618–907. Size at greatest extent in 669.
Europe	10,180,000	Continent in classical antiquity.
Canada	9,984,670	Second largest country in the world; largest country in North America, and in the Western Hemisphere.
China (PRC, including disputed areas)	9,742,010	Largest country located entirely in Asia. Including PRC-administered area (Aksai Chin and Trans-Karakoram Tract, both territories claimed by India), South Tibet (controlled by India as the state of Arunachal Pradesh but claimed by China), and the disputed territories of Taiwan, Penghu, Kinmen, and the Matsu Islands which the Republic of China (Taiwan) has continued to govern after the PRC replaced it on the mainland; total of separate UN figures for Mainland China and the Special Administrative Regions of Hong Kong (1,099 km^{2}) and Macau (26 km^{2}).
China (PRC, non-disputed areas)	9,706,961	Largest country located entirely in Asia. Excluding disputed territories not under PRC administration, i.e. excluding South Tibet (Indian state of Arunachal Pradesh) and Republic of China (Taiwan); total of separate UN figures for Mainland China and the Special Administrative Regions of Hong Kong (1,099 km^{2}) and Macau (26 km^{2}).
United States	9,522,055	Country in North America. Includes the 50 states and District of Columbia with Indian Reservations. Includes inland water area of 78,797 mi^{2} (204,083 km^{2}) and Great Lakes water of 60,251 mi^{2} (156,049 km^{2}); excludes coastal water area of 42,225 mi^{2} (109,362 km^{2}) and territorial water area of 75,372 mi^{2} (195,213 km^{2})
Sahara	9,200,000	Largest hot desert in the world.
Australasian Mediterranean Sea	9,080,000	Mediterranean sea located in the area between Southeast Asia and Australasia.
Oceania	9,008,458	Geopolitical area including Australia and other islands and territories in the Pacific Ocean.
Xiongnu Empire	9,000,000	Size at greatest extent in 176 BC.
Brazil	8,514,877	Largest country in South America.
Empire of Brazil	8,337,218	19th-century state in South America.
The Indies	8,063,879	A European Colonial term for South and Southeast Asia.
Australia and New Zealand	8,010,655	United Nations geoscheme region. Contains Australia, New Zealand, Norfolk Island, Christmas Island, Cocos (Keeling) Island and Heard and McDonald Islands.
Australasia	7,955,717	A subdivision of Oceania.
Economic Cooperation Organization	7,937,197	Asian political and economic intergovernmental organization.
Contiguous United States	7,902,634	Includes the 48 contiguous states and District of Columbia, but excludes Alaska and Hawaii.
Northern Africa	7,880,374	United Nations geoscheme region. Contains Egypt, Sudan, Libya, Tunisia, Algeria, Morocco and Western Sahara.
Australia	7,686,848	Continent and country in Oceania. Includes Jervis Bay Territory (73 km^{2}), Cocos (Keeling) Islands (14 km^{2}), Christmas Island (135 km^{2}) and Lord Howe Island (56 km^{2}). Also includes the uninhabited Ashmore and Cartier Islands (5 km^{2}), Coral Sea Islands Territory (0,9 km^{2}), Heard and McDonald Islands (372 km^{2}) and Macquarie Island (231 km^{2}). Excludes claims on Antarctica (Australian Antarctic Territory, 6,119,818 km^{2}).
Australasian realm	7,600,000	One of the eight biogeographic realms of the Earth.
Mainland Australia	7,595,342	The biggest landmass of Australia, does not include Tasmania, any other islands part of the country, or territories.
Indomalaya	7,500,000	One of the eight biogeographic realms of the Earth.
Middle East	7,207,575	Transcontinental region in Afro-Eurasia.
Akhand Bharat	7,015,501	concept of a greater unified india
Eastern Africa	7,002,969	United Nations geoscheme region. Contains Ethiopia, Eritrea, Djibouti, Somalia, Uganda, Kenya, Tanzania, Rwanda, Burundi, Zambia, Zimbabwe, Mozambique, Malawi, Seychelles, Madagascar, Comoros and Mauritius.
Southern Asia	6,783,786	United Nations geoscheme region. Contains Iran, Afghanistan, Pakistan, India, Sri Lanka, Maldives, British Indian Ocean Territory, Nepal, Bhutan and Bangladesh.
Middle Africa	6,613,058	United Nations geoscheme region. Contains Chad, Cameroon, Central African Republic, Democratic Republic of Congo, Republic of Congo, Gabon, Equatorial Guinea, Sao Tome & Principe and Angola.
Ming China	6,500,000	Chinese Empire after the overthrow of the Yuan Mongol dynasty 1368–1644. Measured at its maximum extent in 1450.
Eastern Han Dynasty	6,500,000	The Chinese Empire lasting from 25 – 220 AD. Size at greatest extent in 100 AD.
Rashidun Caliphate	6,400,000	In 655.
Amazon basin	6,300,000	Drainage basin of Amazon River.
Europe (excluding European Russia)	6,220,000	Traditional region.
(Russia) Far Eastern Federal District	6,215,900	Federal district of Russia created May 2000.
Nordic Council	6,187,000	An official body for former inter-parliamentary between the Nordic countries.
West Africa	6,143,409	United Nations geoscheme region. Contains Mauritania, Mali, Niger, Cabo Verde, Guinea-Bissau, Guinea, Sierra Leone, Liberia, Cote d'Ivoire, Burkina Faso, Ghana, Togo, Benin and Nigeria.
Khanate of the Golden Horde	6,000,000	Multi-country empire in Europe and Asia; a Khanate remnant of the Mongol Empire, lasting from 1240–1502. Size is approximate at its apex in 1310.
Western Han Dynasty	6,000,000	The Chinese Empire lasting from 206 BC – 9 AD. Size at greatest extent in 50 BC.
First Turkic Khaganate	6,000,000	Size at greatest extent in 557.
Australian Antarctic Territory	5,896,500	Australian claim to Antarctica.
Eastern Europe	5,726,128	United Nations geoscheme region. Contains European Russia, Ukraine, Moldova, Romania, Bulgaria, Poland, Czechia, Slovakia and Hungary.
Philippine Sea	5,695,000	Marginal sea of the Western Pacific Ocean east of the Philippine archipelago.
Amazon rainforest	5,500,000	The largest rainforest in the world.
Achaemenid Empire	5,500,000	An empire in Iran and other countries from Greece and Egypt to Uzbekistan from 550–330 BC. Size at greatest extent in 500 BC.
(Portugal) Portuguese Empire	5,500,000	The Portuguese overseas empire at its greatest extent in 1820.
Western China	5,478,097	A geographic concept of the region of western inland China.
Ottoman Empire	5,200,000	Early modern empire centered in Turkey at its greatest extent in 1683.
Macedonia (ancient kingdom)	5,200,000	Ancient empire centered in Macedonia at its greatest extent in 323 BC under Alexander the Great.
South Asian Association for Regional Cooperation (SAARC)	5,130,746	Supranational political entity.
(Russia) Siberian Federal District	5,114,800	Federal district of Russia created May 2000, distinct from but also included in the historical region of the same name.
Arctic sea ice minimum extent (September 2014)	5,020,000	
Brazilian Highlands	5,000,000	Largest plateau in the world by area.
Roman Empire	5,000,000	Multi-country empire in antiquity, under Trajan in AD 117.
Maurya Empire	5,000,000	Indian empire lasted from 321–185 BC, size is calculated to be the greatest extent reached in 250 BC.
British Raj	4,903,312	Unofficially called Indian Empire.
First Mexican Empire	4,874,683	First independent government of Mexico.
Western United States	4,851,700	Region of the United States. Contains the states of California, Oregon, Washington, Idaho, Wyoming, Montana, Colorado, Nevada, Utah, Arizona, New Mexico, Alaska and Hawaii.
Coral Sea	4,791,000	Marginal sea of the South Pacific off the northeast coast of Australia.
Tibetan Empire	4,600,000	The Tibetan state lasting from 650–842, measured at its apex in 800.
First Mexican Republic	4,536,710	North American country existed from 1824 to 1835.
Association of Southeast Asian Nations (ASEAN)	4,465,501	Supranational political entity containing Myanmar, Thailand, Cambodia, Laos, Vietnam, Malaysia, Singapore, Brunei, Philippines, Indonesia and East Timor.
Southeast Asia	4,465,501	United Nations geoscheme region, containing all ASEAN members referenced elsewhere on this list.
Timurid Empire	4,400,000	A Persian Middle Eastern empire, rising after the Mongol Empire lasting from 1355–1740, measured at its apex in 1405.
Indian subcontinent	4,400,000	A peninsular region in south-central Asia, delineated by the Himalayas in the north.
European Union	4,325,675	Supranational political entity.
Organization of Turkic States	4,242,362	Intergovernmental organization compromising Hungary and all internationally recognized Turkic states but Turkmenistan.
Fatimid Caliphate	4,100,000	Western remnant of the Umayyad Caliphate lasting from 909–1171, estimated at its greatest extent in 969.
Central Asia	4,004,451	United Nations geoscheme region. Contains Kazakhstan, Uzbekistan, Turkmenistan, Kyrgyzstan and Tajikistan.
Mughal Empire	4,000,000	An Islamic Empire in India in the early modern period. Size at greatest extent in 1690.
Eastern Turkic Khaganate	4,000,000	Eastern remnant of the Göktürk Khaganate. Size at greatest extent in 624.
Hephthalite Empire	4,000,000	Size at greatest extent in 470.
Hunnic Empire	4,000,000	Size at greatest extent in 441.
European Russia	3,960,000	Traditional historic and geographic region of Russia.
Seleucid Empire	3,900,000	A Greek/Persian Middle Eastern empire lasting from 312–63 BC, was the successor state to the Achaemenid Empire. Measured at its apex in 301 BC.
Rupert's Land	3,900,000	An area of British North America, under the jurisdiction of the Hudson's Bay Company.
Great Seljuq Empire	3,900,000	Turkish empire in the Middle East, was the European antagonist during the Crusades. Lasted from 1037–1194, size is calculated to be the greatest extent reached in 1080.
Arabian Sea	3,862,000	Northern Indian Ocean.
(Brazil) North Region	3,853,676.9	One of the five official regions according to the IBGE. Includes the states of Acre, Amapá, Amazonas, Pará, Rondônia, Roraima, and Tocantins.
Andean Community	3,809,100	A free trade area with the objective of creating a customs union comprising the South American countries.
(Kingdom of Italy) Italian Empire	3,798,000	Includes Italian colonies. Size in 1938.
Ilkhanate	3,750,000	A Khanate remnant of the Mongol Empire, lasting from 1256–1355, measured at its apex in 1310.
Argentina (including claims)	3,748,072	Second largest country in South America. Includes claims over the Falkland Islands, South Georgia and South Sandwich Islands, and Argentine Antarctica, which are not under Argentine de facto control.
Dzungar Khanate	3,600,000	Size in 1650.
Khwarazmian dynasty	3,600,000	Size at greatest extent in 1218.
Northern Canada	3,535,263	Vast northernmost region of Canada.
Sassanid Empire	3,500,000	Successor state to the Parthian Empire in the Middle East and Iran, the last Iranian empire before the rise of Islam, lasting from 224–651, size estimated at its apex in 550.
Zealandia	3,500,000	Largest microcontinent (size is approximate).
Sargasso Sea	3,500,000	Region of the Atlantic Ocean bounded by four currents forming an ocean gyre.
South China Sea	3,500,000	Marginal sea occurring in part of the Pacific Ocean south of China, and bordered predominately by Vietnam, Malaysia, Indonesia, Brunei, and the Philippines.
Gupta Empire	3,500,000	One of the Indian Middle Kingdoms lasting from 320–560, size is estimated at the apex in 400.
Chagatai Khanate	3,500,000	A Khanate remnant of the Mongol Empire, measured at its apex in 1310 and 1350.
Western Turkic Khaganate	3,500,000	Western remnant of the Göktürk Khaganate. Size at greatest extent in 630.
(France) First French colonial empire	3,400,000	Size at greatest extent in 1670.
Ghaznavid Empire	3,400,000	Size at greatest extent in 1029.
India (including disputed areas)	3,287,263	Third largest country in Asia (after Russia and China). Includes all disputed territories.
Delhi Sultanate	3,200,000	Size at greatest extent in 1312.
(German Empire) German Colonial Empire	3,199,015	Size at greatest extent in 1912.
Arabian Peninsula	3,189,612	A geographic region of the Middle East.
India (non-disputed areas)	3,166,414	Third largest country in Asia (after Russia and China). Excludes non-Indian-administered disputed territories (Aksai Chin and Trans-Karakoram Tract in China; Azad Kashmir and Gilgit–Baltistan in Pakistan). Includes all Indian-administered territories, which contains the China-claimed South Tibet, administered by India as part of Arunachal Pradesh.
Northwest China	3,107,701	A statistical region of China.
Sakha Republic	3,103,200	Largest federal subject of Russia.
Song dynasty	3,100,000	The Chinese Empire lasting from 960–1279. Size at greatest extent in 980.
Uyghur Khaganate	3,100,000	Size at greatest extent in 800.
Western Jin Dynasty	3,100,000	Size at greatest extent in 280.
Peru-Bolivian Confederation	3,054,612	A loose confederation existing between 1836 and 1839 in South America.
Khazar Khanate	3,000,000	Size at greatest extent in 850.
Sui dynasty	3,000,000	Size at greatest extent in 589.
Malay Archipelago	2,870,000	Archipelago between mainland Indochina and Australia.
Paratethys sea	2,800,000	largest inland sea/Lake
Byzantine Empire	2,800,000	Remnant of the Roman Empire at its greatest extent in 450.
Parthian Empire	2,800,000	A Persian Middle Eastern empire lasting from 248 BC – 226 AD, was the successor state to the Greek Seleucid Empire and a major antagonist to the Roman Empire. Measured at its apex circa 0 AD.
Medes (Median Empire)	2,800,000	An early Persian Middle Eastern empire lasting from 625–549 BC. Size at greatest extent in 585 BC.
Eastern Jin Dynasty	2,800,000	Size at greatest extent in 347.
Rouran Khaganate	2,800,000	Size in 405.
Weddell Sea	2,800,000	Part of the Southern Ocean.
Eastern Canada	2,783,400	East part of Canada contains six provinces.
Argentina (excluding disputed claims)	2,780,400	Second largest country in South America. Does not include claims over Falkland Islands, South Georgia and the South Sandwich Islands, nor Argentine Antarctica (969,000 km^{2}).
Caribbean Sea	2,754,000	Body of water between North and South America.
Kazakhstan	2,724,900	In Asia; largest landlocked country in the world.
Western Canada	2,703,159	West part of Canada contains four provinces.
Australian Desert	2,700,000	Deserts in Australian mainland.
(Norway) Queen Maud Land	2,700,000	Norwegian Antarctic claim.
Western Asia	2,680,579	United Nations geoscheme region. Contains Turkey, Cyprus, Syria, Lebanon, Israel, Palestine, Jordan, Saudi Arabia, Yemen, Oman, United Arab Emirates, Qatar, Bahrain, Kuwait, Iraq, Georgia, Armenia and Azerbaijan.
Gulf Cooperation Council	2,673,108	Regional intergovernmental political and economic union.
Southern Africa	2,672,831	United Nations geoscheme region. Contains South Africa, Lesotho, Swaziland, Namibia and Botswana.
(United States) Pacific states	2,615,077	Division of the United States. Contains the states of California, Oregon, Washington, Alaska and Hawaii.
Bay of Bengal	2,600,000	Northeastern part of the Indian Ocean.
Western Australia	2,525,500	Largest state of Australia.
Gran Colombia	2,519,954	Republic of Colombia from 1819 to 1831
Former Sudan	2,505,813	Sudan before South Sudan split out of it. Formerly the largest country in Africa.
Mediterranean Sea	2,500,000	Body of water separating Europe and Africa.
Tibetan Plateau	2,500,000	Vast elevated plateau in South Asia, Central Asia and East Asia, the Roof of the World.
Greco-Bactrian Kingdom	2,500,000	A successor state to the Seleucid Empire in what is now Afghanistan and Uzbekistan lasting from 256–125 BC. Size at greatest extent in 184 BC.
Grand Duchy of Moscow	2,500,000	A precursor to the Russian Empire, lasting from 1263–1547. Size in 1505.
Central America	2,486,445	United Nations geoscheme region. Contains Mexico, Belize, Guatemala, El Salvador, Honduras, Nicaragua, Costa Rica and Panama.
East African Community	2,467,202	Intergovernmental organisation composed of six countries in the African Great Lakes region.
Southern United States	2,383,946	Region of the United States. Contains the states of Texas, Louisiana, Arkansas, Oklahoma, Mississippi, Florida, Alabama, Georgia, Tennessee, South Carolina, North Carolina, Kentucky, Virginia, West Virginia, Maryland and Delaware.
Algeria	2,381,741	Largest country in Africa.
Southwest China	2,365,900	A statistical region of China.
Gulf of Guinea	2,350,000	Northeasternmost part of the tropical Atlantic Ocean.
Democratic Republic of the Congo	2,344,858	Second largest country in Africa.
Krasnoyarsk Krai	2,339,700	Federal subject of Russia.
Arabian Desert	2,330,000	Vast desert wilderness in Western Asia.
Qin dynasty	2,300,000	First dynasty of Imperial China.
Central Canada	2,265,154	Sub-region of Eastern Canada.
(United States) Mountain states	2,236,623	Division of the United States. Contains the states of Idaho, Wyoming, Montana, Colorado, Nevada, Utah, Arizona and New Mexico.
Kingdom of Denmark	2,220,093	Including Denmark, Greenland and Faroe Islands.
Greenland	2,175,600	An autonomous country, part of the Kingdom of Denmark.
Saudi Arabia	2,149,690	Largest country in Middle East.
(United States) Louisiana Purchase	2,147,000	Area of the United States purchased from France in 1803, which now comprises all or part of fifteen U.S. states.
Midwestern United States	2,128,257	Region of the United States. Contains the states of Michigan, Wisconsin, Minnesota, Iowa, Missouri, Illinois, Indiana, Ohio, North Dakota, South Dakota, Nebraska and Kansas.
(France) First French Empire	2,100,000	Multi-country empire under Emperor Napoleon I of France, from 1804–1814; size at greatest extent in 1813.
Mainland Southeast Asia (Indochina)	2,071,552	Continental portion of Southeast Asia, compromising Cambodia, Laos, peninsular portion of Malaysia, Myanmar, Singapore, Thailand and Vietnam.
Chile (Including Territorial Claims)	2,007,208	Includes Easter Island (Isla de Pascua; Rapa Nui), Isla Sala y Gómez and Antarctica (1,250,000 km^{2}).
Western Roman Empire	2,000,000	Comprises the western provinces of the Roman Empire.
Inca Empire	2,000,000	Incan Empire along Andean coast in South America lasting from 1438–1533.
Confederate States of America	1,995,392	Unrecognized country in North America, 1861–1865.
Empire of Japan	1,984,000	Size in 1938.
Mexico	1,958,201	Third largest country in North America; also third largest country in Latin America.
Nunavut	1,936,113	Largest sub-federal jurisdiction of Canada, largest territory of Canada.
Indonesia	1,904,569	In Southeast Asia; largest and most populous country situated only on islands.
Sudan	1,886,068	Third largest country in Africa.
Horn of Africa	1,882,757	Peninsula in Eastern Africa.
Northern Europe	1,811,151	United Nations geoscheme region. Contains Norway (including Jan Mayen and Svalbard), Sweden, Finland, Denmark (including Faroe Islands), Iceland, Estonia, Latvia, Lithuania, United Kingdom and Ireland.
(British Empire) Thirteen Colonies	1,876,972	Found by taking the size of the United States less the size of its acquired territories.
(Russia) Urals Federal District	1,788,900	Federal district of Russia created May 2000.
East Indies	1,784,398	A European Colonial term for Maritime Southeast Asia, including Malaysia, East Timor, the Philippines, Brunei, Singapore and Indonesia (less its territory on New Guinea).
Libya	1,759,540	Country in northern Africa.
Queensland	1,727,300	State of Australia.
Alaska	1,717,856	Largest state of the United States.
Sinkiang	1,711,931	Former province of Xinjiang, a province of the Republic of China, also spelled Sinkiang Province.
British Antarctic Territory	1,709,400	British claim to Antarctica
Guiana Island	1,700,000	Region in South America.
(Russia) Northwestern Federal District	1,677,900	Federal district of Russia created May 2000.
(China) Xinjiang	1,660,000	Largest autonomous region of China.
Iran	1,648,195	Second largest country in Middle East.
(Brazil) Central-West Region	1,612,077.2	One of the five official regions according to the IBGE. Includes the states of Distrito Federal, Goiás, Mato Grosso and Mato Grosso do Sul.
Four Oirat	1,600,000	Area in 17th century.
Amazonas	1,570,746	Largest state of Brazil.
Mongolia	1,564,116	Country located between China and Russia.
(Brazil) Northeast Region	1,558,196	One of the five official regions according to the IBGE. Includes the states of Maranhão, Piauí, Ceará, Rio Grande do Norte, Paraíba, Pernambuco, Alagoas, Sergipe and Bahia, along with the Fernando de Noronha archipelago.
North China (including eastern Inner Mongolia)	1,556,061	A statistical region of China.
(Indonesia) Greater Sunda Islands	1,510,709	Four large islands in the Indonesian archipelago. Includes Borneo, Sumatra, Sulawesi and Java.
Qara Khitai	1,500,000	Also known as the Western Liao.
Gulf of Mexico	1,500,000	Body of water in North America.
Canadian Arctic Archipelago	1,407,770	An archipelago of over 36,000 islands in the Arctic Ocean, all part of Canada.
Khoshut Khanate	1,400,000	An Oirat khanate based in the Tibetan Plateau.
Neo-Assyrian Empire	1,400,000	An ancient Middle Eastern empire along the Fertile Crescent, lasting from 934–609 BC.
Quebec	1,365,128	Second largest sub-federal jurisdiction of Canada, largest province of Canada.
Mexican Cession	1,360,000	A large area of the First Mexican Empire, which was lost after the Mexican–American War in 1848 to the US.
(United States) West North Central states	1,347,716	Division of the United States. Contains the states of Minnesota, Iowa, Missouri, North Dakota, South Dakota, Nebraska and Kansas.
Northern Territory	1,346,200	Territory of Australia.
Kalmar Union	1,322,358	A medieval and early modern Kingdom in Scandinavia consisting of Denmark, Iceland, Norway and most of modern Sweden and Finland, lasting from 1397–1523. Size does not include the colonial territories in Greenland.
Westarctica	1,320,000	A micronation in Antarctica.
Republic of New Granada	1,331,250	Modern day Colombia from 1831 to 1858
Southern Europe	1,316,300.44	United Nations geoscheme region. Contains Spain, Portugal, Andorra, Italy, Malta, San Marino, Vatican City, Slovenia, Croatia, Bosnia and Herzegovina, Serbia, Montenegro, Kosovo, Albania, Macedonia and Greece.
Gobi Desert	1,295,000	Desert or brushland region in East Asia.
Peru	1,285,216	Country in South America.
Chad	1,284,000	Country in Africa.
Niger	1,267,000	Country in Africa.
(Magallanes y la Antártica Chilena Region) Chilean Antarctic Territory	1,250,258	Chilean claim to Antarctica
East China Sea	1,249,000	Marginal sea east of China, also bordered by South Korea and Japan.
Pará	1,247,690	Second largest state of Brazil.
Angola	1,246,700	Country in Africa.
Mali	1,240,192	Country in Africa.
Hudson Bay	1,230,000	Body of water in northeastern Canada.
(China) Tibet Autonomous Region	1,228,400	Autonomous region of China.
Ethiopian Empire (Abyssinia)	1,221,900	An African Empire lasting from 980 BC – 1974 AD.
South Africa	1,221,148	Country in Africa. Area of mainland South Africa is 1,220,813 km^{2} (471,359 sq mi), added to which are the Prince Edward Islands – Marion Island, 290 km^{2}, and Prince Edward Island, 45 km^{2}.
Central Europe	1,200,790	United Nations geoscheme region. Contains France, Monaco, Netherlands, Belgium, Luxembourg, Germany, Switzerland, Liechtenstein and Austria.
Carolingian Empire	1,200,000	The maximum extent of Frankish Kingdom under Charlemagne in 814. An immediate precursor to the Holy Roman Empire.
Srivijaya	1,200,000	Buddhist thalassocratic empire based on the island of Sumatra, Indonesia.
Northwest Territories	1,183,085	Territory of Canada.
(China) Inner Mongolia	1,183,000	Autonomous region of China.
Polish–Lithuanian Commonwealth	1,153,465	The maximum extent of bi-confederation of Poland and Lithuania, in 1650.
(United States) West South Central States	1,150,090	Division of the United States. Contains the states of Arkansas, Louisiana, Oklahoma and Texas.
Colombia	1,138,914	Country in South America. Colombian census figure is 1,141,748 which includes three special districts and San Andrés and Providencia islands (52 km^{2}).
Ethiopia	1,104,300	Country in Africa.
Bolivia	1,098,581	Country in South America.
Melanesia	1,040,672	One of the Island subdivisions of Oceania.
French East India Company	1,040,549	The maximum extent of French Colonial rule in India in 1754. Estimated by adding together the areas of the States and territories of India which correspond approximately to the French East India Company.
(Russia) Volga Federal District	1,038,000	Federal district of Russia created May 2000.
Mauritania	1,025,520	Country in Africa.
Tarim Basin	1,020,000	Endorheic basin in Northwest China.
South Central China	1,014,354	A statistical region of China.
Republic of Texas	1,007,935	Briefly independent breakaway state from the First Mexican Empire in 1835, later annexed in 1846 by the United States.
Tierra del Fuego (including claims)	1,002,445	If taken to include claims to the Falkland Islands, South Georgia and South Sandwich Islands, and Argentine Antarctica (none of which are controlled by Argentina). Argentina's largest province, if these claims are included.
New Kingdom of Egypt	1,000,000	The final imperial phase of dynastic Egypt, lasting from 1570–1070 BC.
Khmer Empire	1,000,000	Hindu/Buddhist empire in Southeast Asia.
Oceanian realm	1,000,000	One of the eight biogeographic realms of the Earth. This is one of a series of comprehensive lists of continents, countries, and first level administrative country subdivisions such as states, provinces, and territories, as well as certain political and geographic features of substantial area. References for the information provided in this table may be found in the individual articles on each body listed herein. Some divisions are listed twice, with one listing including territory that is excluded in the other for various reasons, including territorial disputes. There is intentional overlap among the lists in order to maximize ease of use.: Geographic entity / Area (km^{2}) / Notes <onlyinclude>; (Russia) West Siberian economic region / 992,000 / Economic Region of Russia.; (Nunavut) Qikiqtaaluk Region / 989,879.35 / Largest second-level administrative division in the world.; Manchukuo / 984,195 / A puppet state of the Empire of Japan, existed during 1932–1945.; South Australia / 983,482 / State of Australia.; Egypt / 980,869 / Country in Africa; excluding the Halaib Triangle.; Sea of Japan / 978,000 / Body of water between the Korean Peninsula to the west, Russia to the north, and Japan to the east.; Northeast Greenland National Park / 972,000 / Largest administrative division of Greenland; largest National Park in the world.; Argentine Antarctica / 965,597 / Argentine claim over Antarctica; Tanzania / 945,087 / Country in Africa. Includes the islands of Mafia, Pemba, and Zanzibar.; Argentine Sea / 940,000 / Body of water within the continental shelf off the Argentine mainland. It extends from Buenos Aires Province coast on the North to the Falkland Islands on the South.; British Columbia / 925,186 / Province of Canada. Land area only.; (Brazil) Southeast Region / 924,511.3 / One of the five official regions according to the IBGE. Includes the states of Espírito Santo, Minas Gerais, Rio de Janeiro, and São Paulo.; Nigeria / 923,768 / Country in Africa.; Merovengian Kingdom of Francia / 918,881 / The Frankish Kingdom after the conquest of Burgundy, lasting from 536-768.; Ontario / 917,741 / Second largest province of Canada. Land area only. With water area can excess 1,000,000; Venezuela / 916,445 / Country in South America; does not include claims of the Guyana–Venezuela territorial dispute. If included, the area would be 1,075,945 km^{2}.; Mato Grosso / 903,358 / State of Brazil.; Kalahari Desert / 900,000 / Semi-arid sandy savannah in Southern Africa.; Taymyrsky Dolgano-Nenetsky District / 897,900 / Largest second-level administrative divisions in Russia.; Pakistan (including disputed areas) / 880,254 / Country in South Asia. Includes Pakistani-administered disputed territories (Azad Kashmir and Northern Areas).; Grand Duchy of Lithuania / 876,600 / A large medieval pagan empire in Europe lasting from 1253-1569 as an independent state, prior to its union with Poland. Measured at its greatest extent in the 15th century.; (Libya) Cyrenaica / 855,370 / Eastern coastal region of Libya.; (Alaska) Unorganized Borough / 837,700 / Subdivided part of Alaska, largest "borough" of the state.; Namibia / 824,292 / Country in Africa.; (Russia) Ural economic region / 824,000 / Economic region of Russia.; Holy Roman Empire / 814,415 / Central European Confederacy from 962-1806. Measured at its largest extent under Ferdinand II, Holy Roman Emperor.; Mozambique / 801,590 / Country in Africa.; New South Wales / 800,642 / State of Australia.; Akkadian Empire / 800,000 / An ancient middle eastern empire centered on the Fertile Crescent, lasting from 2400-2200 BC.; Pakistan (non-disputed areas) / 796,095 / Country in South Asia. Excludes all disputed territories.; East China / 795,837 / A statistical region of China.; Northeast China (Without eastern Inner Mongolia) / 793,300 / A statistical region of China.; Khabarovsk Krai / 788,600 / Federal subject of Russia.; New Guinea / 786,000 / Island divided between Indonesia and Papua New Guinea.; Turkey / 783,562 / Country partly in Europe and partly in Asia.; (United States) East North Central states / 780,541 / Division of the United States. Contains the states of Michigan, Wisconsin, Illinois, Indiana, and Ohio.; Union between Sweden and Norway (United Kingdom of Sweden and Norway) / 774,184 / A Kingdom in Scandinavia between 1814-1905.; (Western Australia) Goldfields–Esperance / 771,276 / Largest region of Western Australia.; Irkutsk Oblast / 767,900 / Federal subject of Russia.; Evenkiysky District / 763,200 / Second largest second-level administrative divisions in Russia.; (United States) South Atlantic states / 758,842 / Division of the United States. Contains the states of Virginia, West Virginia, North Carolina, South Carolina, Georgia, Florida, Maryland, Delaware and District of Columbia.; Chile / 756,096 / Includes Easter Island (Isla de Pascua; Rapa Nui) and Isla Sala y Gómez, excludes claims on Antarctica (1,250,000 km^{2}).; Zambia / 752,618 / Country in Africa.; Aerican Empire / 750,503 / A self-proclaimed monarchist micronation in Canada.; Yamalo-Nenets Autonomous Okrug / 750,300 / Federal subject of Russia.; Scandinavian Peninsula / 750,000 / Peninsula in Europe, occupied by Norway and Sweden.; Borneo / 748,168 / Island divided between Brunei, Indonesia and Malaysia.; (Quebec) Nord-du-Québec / 747,191.93 / Largest subdivisions of Quebec.; Chukotka Autonomous Okrug / 737,700 / Federal subject of Russia.; (China) Qinghai / 721,200 / Largest province of China.; Oregon Territory / 720,011 / Territory acquired from Britain by the US in 1848.; Eastern Province, Saudi Arabia (Ash Sharqiyah) / 710,000 / Largest province of Saudi Arabia.; Texas / 696,200 / State of the United States.; Visigothic Kingdom / 684,738 / A Germanic Kingdom on the Iberian peninsula, lasting from 474-723. Measured at its apex in 500.; Austria-Hungary / 676,615 / Central European empire from 1867 to 1918.; Myanmar / 676,578 / Country in Southeast Asia.; Patagonian Desert / 673,000 / Largest desert in South America.; (Niger) Agadez Region / 667,799 / Largest region of Niger.; (Greenland) Qaasuitsup / 660,000 / Largest municipality of Greenland.; (Russia) Central Federal District / 652,800 / Federal district of Russia, created May 2000.; Afghanistan / 652,090 / Country in Central Asia.; (Brazil) (Argentina) (Paraguay) (Bolivia) Gran Chaco / 647,000 / Geographical region in South America.; France / 643,801 / Third largest European country (Metropolitan France only). While not fully part of France, the French Republic also includes French Overseas Collectivity and covers 674,843 km^{2}, excluding claims on Antarctica (432,000 km^{2}). With its overseas territories France precedes Ukraine as the second largest European country.; Alberta / 642,317 / Province of Canada. Land area only; Somalia / 637,657 / Country in Africa.; Nazi Germany / 633,786 / Nazi Germany encompasses present day Germany, and a few other territories.; Austrian Empire / 625,418 / A central European empire lasting from 1804-1867; (South Australia) Outback Communities Authority / 624,339 / Largest second level administrative division of Australia.; Central African Republic / 622,984 / Country in Africa.; South Sudan / 619,745 / Country in Africa.; Merovengian Kingdom of Francia / 611,759 / The Frankish Kingdom at its founding under Clovis I in 481.; Ukraine / 603,700 / Second largest European country.; (Chad) Borkou-Ennedi-Tibesti Region / 600,350 / Largest region of Chad.; Saskatchewan / 591,670 / Province of Canada. Land area only.; Arkhangelsk Oblast / 589,200 / Federal district of Russia, created May 2000.; Madagascar / 587,041 / Island country in Africa. Second largest country composed of a single island (after Australia).; Minas Gerais / 586,528 / State of Brazil.; Ostrogothic Kingdom / 586,046 / A Germanic Kingdom in Italy and Illyria after the fall of the Western Roman Empire, lasting from 476-553. Measurement is approximate.; Iberian Peninsula / 581,471 / A peninsula of Southwest Europe, occupied by Spain and Portugal.; Botswana / 581,730 / Country in Africa.; Kenya / 580,367 / Country in Africa.; (Brazil) South Region / 576,409.6 / One of the five official regions according to the IBGE. Includes the states of Paraná, Rio Grande do Sul, and Santa Catarina.; Caliphate of Córdoba / 570,000 / A Moorish Caliphate in Iberia after the local withdrawal of the Fatimid Caliphate, lasting from 756-1031.; Bahia / 564,693 / State of Brazil.; (Algeria) Tamanrasset Province / 557,906 / Largest province of Algeria.; Manitoba / 553,556 / Province of Canada. Land area only.; (Libya) Fezzan / 551,700 / Southwestern region of modern Libya.; Metropolitan France / 551,500 / The parts of France which are on the European Continent.; German Empire / 540,000 / The unified German state from 1871-1918.; (Saudi Arabia) Al-Ahsa Governorate / 534,000 / Largest second level administrative division of Saudi Arabia.; (Greenland) Sermersooq / 531,900 / Second largest second level administrative division of Greenland.; Yemen / 527,968 / Country in Middle East. Includes Perim, Socotra, the former Yemen Arab Republic (YAR or North Yemen), and the former People's Democratic Republic of Yemen (PDRY or South Yemen).; Khanty–Mansi Autonomous Okrug / 523,100 / Federal subject of Russia.; (Greenland) Avannaata / 522,700 / Third largest second level administrative division of Greenland.; Central America / 521,499 / Region between North America and South America.; Thailand / 513,115 / Country in Southeast Asia.; (Western Australia) Pilbara / 771,276 / Second largest region of Western Australia.; (Canada) Baffin Island / 507,451 / Island in Canadian Arctic.; Spain / 506,030 / Country in Europe. Includes mainland Spain, the Balearic Islands and Canary Islands, as well as the Spanish possessions (Plazas de Soberanía) off the coast of Morocco (Ceuta, Melilla, Islas Chafarinas, Peñón de Alhucemas, and Peñón de Vélez de la Gomera), and Isla de Alborán almost midway between Morocco and Spain, all the latter being claimed by Morocco, and the small enclave of Llívia totally surrounded by France. Excluding Gibraltar Which is part of the UK; Balkan Peninsula / 505,000 / Southeasternmost peninsula of Europe.; Atlantic Canada / 500,531 / Smallest main region of Canada.; Middle Kingdom of Egypt / 500,000 / Second Egyptian dynastic empire lasting from 2080-1640 BC.; Neo-Babylonian Empire / 500,000 / An ancient Middle Eastern empire centered on the Fertile Crescent, lasting from 626 to 539 BC.; Aztec Empire / 500,000 / A Meso-American Empire in Mexico lasting from 1325-1521.; Syrian Desert / 500,000 / Desert in the Middle East.; == See also == Other divisions: 0.1 to 1,000,000+ square kilometers; 1,000,000+ square kilometers; Smaller divisions: 200,000+ square kilometers • 100,000 to 1,000,000 square kilometers • 50,000 to 200,000 square kilometers • 20,000 to 50,000 square kilometers; 5,000 to 20,000 square kilometers • 1,000 to 5,000 square kilometers • 0.1 to 1,000 square kilometers; 500,000 to 1,000,000 square kilometers • 200,000 to 500,000 square kilometers • 100,000 to 200,000 square kilometers; 50,000 to 100,000 square kilometers • 30,000 to 50,000 square kilometers • 20,000 to 30,000 square kilometers • 10,000 to 20,000 square kilometers; 7,000 to 10,000 square kilometers • 5,000 to 7,000 square kilometers • 3,000 to 5,000 square kilometers • 1,000 to 3,000 square kilometers; 250 to 1,000 square kilometers • 50 to 250 square kilometers • Under 50 square kilometers; Other: List of countries and dependencies by area; List of largest empires; List of administrative divisions by country; Category:Ranked lists of country subdivisions
(Mali) Tombouctou Region	496,611	Largest region of Mali
Turkmenistan	488,100	Country in Central Asia
Denmark-Norway	487,476	A Scandinavian kingdom lasting from 1536 to 1814.
(China) Sichuan	485,000	Province of China.
(Libya) Kufra District	483,510	Largest district of Libya. The 32 districts were reorganized into 22 Sha'biyah in 2007, but Kufra appears to have retained its borders.
(Western Australia) Mid West	478,000	Third largest region of Western Australia.
Cameroon	475,442	Country in Africa.
(United States) East South Central states	475,014	Division of the United States. Contains the states of Alabama, Mississippi, Tennessee and Kentucky.
Yukon	474,391	Territory of Canada.
Kamchatka Krai	472,300	Federal subject of Russia.
(China) Bayingolin Mongol Autonomous Prefecture	471,526	Largest autonomous prefecture of China.
Northeastern United States	469,615	Region of the United States. Maine, New York, New Hampshire, Vermont, Massachusetts, Connecticut, Rhode Island, Pennsylvania and New Jersey.
Weimar Republic	468,787	German state from 1918 to 1933.
Papua New Guinea	462,840	Country in Oceania.
Magadan Oblast	461,400	Federal subject of Russia.
(China) Heilongjiang	454,800	Province of China.
(China) Gansu	453,700	Province of China.
(China) Nagqu	450,537	City of China.
Ross Dependency	450,000	New Zealand claim to Antarctica.
Sweden	449,964	Country in Europe. Includes Gotland and Öland.
Uzbekistan	447,400	Country in Central Asia; largest doubly landlocked country of the world.
Morocco	446,550	Country in Africa; excluding Western Sahara.
(Indonesia) Sumatra	443,066	Island in Indonesia.
Iraq	438,317	Country in Middle East.
(Russia) North Caucasus Economic Region (including disputed areas)	433,228	Economic region of Russia, including Sevastopol and the Republic of Crimea.
(French Southern and Antarctic Lands) Adélie Land	432,000	French claim to Antarctica; largest district of the French Southern and Antarctic Lands.
Zabaykalsky Krai	431,500	Federal subject of Russia.
(Kazakhstan) Karagandy Province	428,000	Largest province of Kazakhstan.
(Algeria) Adrar Province	427,368	Second largest province of Algeria.
(Western Australia) Kimberley	424,517	Most northern region of Western Australia.
California	423,970	State of the United States.
Papua	421,981	Province of Indonesia, status uncertain following Indonesian declaration of intent to subdivide into smaller provinces.
(Canada) Queen Elizabeth Islands	419,061	Subsection of islands in the Arctic Archipelago.
Komi Republic	415,900	Federal subject of Russia.
(Saudi Arabia) Riyadh Province	412,000	Second largest province of Saudi Arabia.
Arkhangelsk Oblast	410,700	Federal subject of Russia.
Gulf of Aden	410,000	Sea in between the Horn of Africa and the Arabian Peninsula.
Paraguay	406,752	Country in South America.
(Russia) North Caucasus Economic Region (non-disputed areas)	405,400	Economic region of Russia, not including Sevastopol and the Republic of Crimea.
Old Kingdom	400,000	The first unified Egyptian empire lasting from 2686–2134 BC.
Middle Assyrian period	400,000	An ancient Middle Eastern kingdom in the Fertile Crescent, lasting from 1365–1000 BC.
(China) Yunnan	394,000	Province of China.
(China) Nagqu	391,817	Largest prefecture-level city of China.
Zimbabwe	390,757	Country in Africa.
Kurdistan	390,000(Est.)	Region in the Middle East; homeland of the Kurds
Second Polish Republic	389,720	Country in Interwar Europe. Size accounts for area peak in 1939.
Norway (total)	385,155	Country in Europe. Includes mainland Norway (324,220 km^{2}) and the integral overseas areas of Svalbard and Jan Mayen (60,980 km^{2}); excludes the dependency of Bouvet Island (49 km^{2}) and the Antarctic dependency claims of Queen Maud Land and Peter I Island (~2,500,000 km^{2}).
Yukon-Koyukuk Census Area	382,810	Census area in the U.S. State of Alaska, largest county-equivalent in the United States.
Montana	380,838	State of the United States.
Japan	377,873	Country in Asia. Includes Ryukyu Islands (including Daitō Islands), Ogasawara Islands (Bonin Islands), Minami-Torishima (Marcus Island), Okino-Torishima and Volcano Islands (Kazan Islands); excludes the southern Kuril Islands.
Baltic Sea	377,000	Sea in Europe, bordered to the north by Sweden and Finland, to the east by Finland, Russia, Estonia, Latvia, and Lithuania, on the south by Poland and Germany, and on the West by Denmark.
New Valley Governorate	376,505	Largest governorate of Egypt.
Newfoundland and Labrador	373,872	Province of Canada.
(South Africa) Northern Cape	372,889	Largest province of South Africa.
Caspian Sea	371,000	Body of water in Central Asia variously classed as the world's largest lake or a full-fledged sea. Between Russia, Kazakhstan, Azerbaijan, Turkmenistan, and Iran.
Santa Cruz Department	370,621	Largest department of Bolivia.
Loreto Region	368,852	Largest region of Peru.
Amur Oblast	363,700	Federal subject of Russia.
Mato Grosso do Sul	357,125	State of Brazil.
Germany	357,022	Country in Europe; before the German reunification took place on 3 October 1990, Germany consisted of the former Federal Republic of Germany (FRG, West Germany) with 248,689 km^{2} and the German Democratic Republic (GDR, East Germany) with 108,333 km^{2}.
(Ethiopia) Oromia Region	353,632	Largest region of Ethiopia.
(Libya) Tripolitania	353,000	Historic region and former province of Libya.
(Buryatia) Buryat Republic	351,300	Federal subject of Russia.
Adélie Land	351,000	District French southern territories.
(Libya) Murzuq District	349,790	2nd largest district of Libya. The 32 districts were reorganized into 22 Sha'biyah in 2007, but Murzuq appears to have retained its borders.
Kingdom of Prussia	348,779	Former European kingdom-state between 1701 1918. Measured area from 1871.
(Sudan) Northern	348,765	Largest state of Sudan.
(Balochistan, Pakistan) Balochistan	347,190	Largest province of Pakistan.
Rajasthan	342,236	Largest state of India.
Republic of the Congo	342,000	Country in Africa.
Goiás	340,087	State of Brazil.
Finland	338,145	Country in Europe. Includes Åland.
South Yemen	332,970	Former country in the Middle East from 1967 to 1990; now reunified into Yemen.
Maranhão	331,983	State of Brazil.
Vietnam	331,689	Country in Southeast Asia.
Malaysia	329,847	Country in Southeast Asia.
(China) Haixi Mongol and Tibetan Autonomous Prefecture	325,785	Second largest autonomous prefecture of China.
Norway (excluding self-governing territories)	323,941	Country in Europe. Includes mainland Norway; excludes the integral overseas areas of Svalbard and Jan Mayen (60,980 km^{2}), the dependency of Bouvet Island (49 km^{2}) and the Antarctic dependency claims of Queen Maud Land and Peter I Island (~2,500,000 km^{2}).
Côte d'Ivoire	322,463	Country in Africa.
Tomsk Oblast	316,900	Federal subject of Russia.
British Isles	315,134	A series of islands in northern Europe.
New Mexico	314,915	State of the United States.
Poland	312,685	Country in Central Europe.
Oman	309,500	Country in Middle East.
Madhya Pradesh	308,144	State of India.
Maharashtra	307,713	State of India
Buenos Aires Province	307,571	Largest province of Argentina
Italy	301,318	Country in Europe
(Kazakhstan) Aktobe Province	300,600	Second-largest province of Kazakhstan.
Philippines	300,000	Country in Southeast Asia.
(Sudan) North Darfur	296,420	Second largest state of Sudan.
Arizona	295,254	State of the United States
Kingdom of Romania	295,049	Kingdom of Romania (1881–1947) at its greater extent in between 1919 and 1940
(Anadyrsky District) Anadyrsky	287,900	Administrative and municipal district of Chukotka.
Nevada	286,351	State of the United States
Yugoslavia	284,710	A Balkan country lasting from 1918 to 1992.
(Algeria) Illizi Province	284,618	Province of Algeria.
Ecuador	283,561	Country in South America. Includes Galápagos Islands.
East Kazakhstan Province	283,300	Third largest province of Kazakhstan.
(United States) Mid-Atlantic states	283,168	Division of the United States. New York, Pennsylvania and New Jersey.
Rio Grande do Sul	281,749	State of Brazil.
Somali Region	279,252	Second largest region of Ethiopia.
Tocantins	277,621	State of Brazil.
Andhra Pradesh	275,068	State of India.
Burkina Faso	274,000	Country in Africa.
New Zealand	270,534	Country in Oceania. Includes Antipodes Islands, Auckland Islands, Bounty Islands, Campbell Island, Chatham Islands, and Kermadec Islands. Excludes Niue (260 km^{2}), the Cook Islands (236 km^{2}) and Tokelau (12 km^{2}), as well as the Antarctic claim of Ross Dependency (450,000 km^{2}).
Colorado	269,601	State of the United States.
Gabon	267,668	Country in Africa.
Western Sahara	266,000	Country in Africa; largely occupied by Morocco, some territory administered by the Sahrawi Arab Democratic Republic.
(Russia) Volga-Vyatka	265,400	Economic Region of Russia.
Lake Agassiz	260,000	Former Largest glacial lake
Oregon	254,805	State of the United States.
Wyoming	253,348	State of the United States.
Michigan	253,266	State of the United States.
(Mauritania) Tiris Zemmour	252,900	Largest region of Mauritania.
Piauí	251,529	State of Brazil.
Serbian Empire	250,000	Serbian medieval empire from 1346–1371.
West Germany	248,689	Former country in Europe from 1949 to 1990; now reunified into Germany.
São Paulo	248,209	State of Brazil.
Guinea	245,857	Country in Africa.
North Slope Borough, Alaska	245,436	County of Alaska; largest county in the United States, and largest organized political subdivision that is not a state.
East Kalimantan	245,238	Province of Indonesia.
Chihuahua	244,938	Largest state of Mexico.
Great Lakes	244,100	Lake system in North America, predominately between Canada and the United States.
Santa Cruz	243,943	Second largest province of Argentina.
United Kingdom	242,900	Country in Europe. Excludes the three Crown dependencies (768 km^{2}), the 13 British overseas territories (17,027 km^{2}) and the British Antarctic Territory (1,395,000 km^{2}).
(Castile (historical region)) Crown of Castile	241,782	Royal union of Kingdoms in Spain lasting from 1230–1760, also known as the Kingdom of Castile y Leon.
Uganda	241,038	Country in Africa.
Uttar Pradesh	238,566	State of India.
Ghana	238,533	Country in Africa.
Romania	238,391	Country in Central Europe.
Bolívar	238,000	Largest state of Venezuela.
(China) Guangxi	237,600	Autonomous region of China.
Rondônia	237,576	State of Brazil.
Laos	236,800	Country in Southeast Asia.
Caribbean	234,917	Also known as the West Indies, all the islands of the Caribbean Sea including the Greater Antilles, the Lesser Antilles and the Lucayan Archipelago.
Sichuan Basin	229,500	Lowland region in southwestern China.
Victoria	227,146	State of Australia.
(Kazakhstan) Kyzylorda Province	226,000	Province of Kazakhstan.
Minnesota	225,365	State of the United States.
(Japan) Honshu	225,800	The biggest of the four main islands of Japan.
Chubut	224,686	Third largest province of Argentina.
Roraima	224,299	State of Brazil.
(Kazakhstan) Almaty Province	224,000	Province of Kazakhstan.
Korea	223,915	Peninsular region in East Asia.
(Angola) Moxico Province	223,023	Largest province of Angola.
Jammu and Kashmir	222,236	State of India.
North Kurdufan	221,900	Third largest state of Sudan.
Korea	220,186	Country in Asia prior to 1948; now divided into North Korea and South Korea.
Utah	219,887	State of the United States.
Kingdom of Hungary	218,915	A European Kingdom lasting from 1000–1804. Measured at its apex in 1450.
(Sudan) Red Sea	218,887	State of Sudan.
(Canada) Victoria Island	217,291	Second-largest island in the Arctic Archipelago.
Idaho	216,446	State of the United States.
(Mauritania) Adrar	215,300	Second largest region of Mauritania.
Guyana	214,969	Country in South America.
Beni Department	213,564	Second largest department of Bolivia.
Kansas	213,096	State of the United States.
(Matrouh Governorate) Matruh Governorate	212,112	Second largest governorate of Egypt.
(Algeria) Ouargla Province	211,980	Province of Algeria.
(China) Hunan	210,000	Province of China.
Great Britain	209,331	An island of the British Isles, largest of that group.
Belarus	207,600	Largest landlocked country in Europe.
Greater Antilles	207,435	An island grouping in the Caribbean.
(China) Shaanxi	205,600	Province of China.
(Punjab, Pakistan) Punjab	205,344	Second largest province of Pakistan.
Red Sea Governorate	203,685	Third largest governorate of Egypt.
Río Negro	203,013	Province of Argentina.
Nebraska	200,345	State of the United States.

== See also ==
Other divisions

- 0.1 to 1,000,000+ square kilometers
- 1,000,000+ square kilometers

Smaller divisions

- 200,000+ square kilometers • 100,000 to 1,000,000 square kilometers • 50,000 to 200,000 square kilometers • 20,000 to 50,000 square kilometers
- 5,000 to 20,000 square kilometers • 1,000 to 5,000 square kilometers • 0.1 to 1,000 square kilometers
- 500,000 to 1,000,000 square kilometers • 200,000 to 500,000 square kilometers • 100,000 to 200,000 square kilometers
- 50,000 to 100,000 square kilometers • 30,000 to 50,000 square kilometers • 20,000 to 30,000 square kilometers • 10,000 to 20,000 square kilometers
- 7,000 to 10,000 square kilometers • 5,000 to 7,000 square kilometers • 3,000 to 5,000 square kilometers • 1,000 to 3,000 square kilometers
- 250 to 1,000 square kilometers • 50 to 250 square kilometers • Under 50 square kilometers

Other

- List of countries and dependencies by area
- List of largest empires
- List of administrative divisions by country
- Category:Ranked lists of country subdivisions
