= Falklands Crisis =

Falklands Crisis may refer to:

- Falklands Crisis (1770), a dispute over the Falkland Islands between Great Britain and Spain
- Falklands Crisis (1982), the 1982 invasion of the Falkland Islands by Argentina and subsequent recapture by British forces

== See also ==
- Falkland Islands sovereignty dispute
- Reassertion of British sovereignty over the Falkland Islands (disambiguation)
- South Georgia and the South Sandwich Islands sovereignty dispute
