= List of political and geographic subdivisions by total area from 100,000 to 200,000 square kilometers =

This is one of a series of comprehensive lists of continents, countries, and first level administrative country subdivisions such as states, provinces, and territories, as well as certain political and geographic features of substantial area. References for the information provided in this table may be found in the individual articles on each body listed herein. Some divisions are listed twice, with one listing including territory that is excluded in the other for various reasons, including territorial disputes. There is intentional overlap among the lists in order to maximize ease of use.

Geographic entity	Area (km^{2})	Notes
Kyrgyzstan	199,900	Country in Central Asia.
South Dakota	199,731	State of the United States.
(Democratic Republic of the Congo) Tshopo	199,567	Province of the Democratic Republic of the Congo.
Paraná	199,315	State of Brazil.
(China) Ruoqiang County	199,222	County of China. Largest third-level administrative division in the world.
(Angola) Cuando Cubango Province	199,049	Second largest province of Angola.
Senegal	196,722	Country in Africa.
(Canada) Ellesmere Island	196,236	Third-largest island in the Arctic Archipelago.
Gujarat	196,024	State of India.
(Kazakhstan) Kostanay Province	196,000	Province of Kazakhstan.
North Yemen	195,000	Former country in the Middle East from 1967 to 1990; now reunified into Yemen.
Sverdlovsk Oblast	194,800	Federal subject of Russia.
Karnataka	191,791	State of India.
Kingdom of the Lombards	189,418	A Germanic Kingdom in northern Italy, lasting from 568-774.
(China) Hebei	187,700	Province of China.
(China) Jilin	187,400	Province of China.
(United States) New England	186,447	Division of the United States. Maine, New Hampshire, Vermont, Massachusetts, Connecticut and Rhode Island.
(China) Hubei	185,900	Province of China.
Syria (including disputed areas)	185,180	Country in Middle East. Including the Golan Heights.
Washington	184,665	State of the United States.
Syria (non-disputed areas)	183,885	Country in Middle East. Excluding the Golan Heights.
North Dakota	183,112	State of the United States.
(Mauritania) Hodh Ech Chargui	182,700	Third largest region of Mauritania.
Sonora	182,052	State of Mexico.
(Iran) Sistan and Baluchestan province	181,785	Largest province of Iran.
Yorubaland	181,300	Homeland and the cultural region of the Yoruba people.
Oklahoma	181,035	State of the United States.
Cambodia	181,035	Country in Southeast Asia.
(Iran) Kerman province	180,836	Second largest province of Iran.
(Indonesia) Sulawesi	180,681	Island of Indonesia.
Missouri	180,533	State of the United States.
Amazonas (Venezuelan state)	180,145	Second largest state of Venezuela.
(China) Guangdong	180,000	Province of China.
Novosibirsk Oblast	178,200	Federal subject of Russia.
Nenets Autonomous Okrug	176,700	Federal subject of Russia.
Somaliland	176,210	Historic region of Somalia.
(China) Guizhou	176,000	Province of China.
Uruguay	175,016	Country in South America.
(Kenya) Rift Valley Province	173,854	Largest province of Kenya.
(Saudi Arabia) Al Madinah (Medina)	173,000	Third largest province of Saudi Arabia.
Republic of Karelia	172,400	Federal subject of Russia.
(Mali) Gao Region	170,572	Second largest region of Mali.
Tuva Republic	170,500	Federal subject of Russia.
Florida	170,304	State of the United States.
(Democratic Republic of the Congo) Kasai-Oriental	170,302	Province of the Democratic Republic of the Congo.
Wisconsin	169,639	State of the United States.
Altai Krai	169,100	Federal subject of Russia.
Eastern Cape	168,966	Second largest province of South Africa.
(Yemen) Hadhramaut Governorate	167,280	Largest governorate of Yemen.
(China) Jiangxi	167,000	Province of China.
(China) Henan	167,000	Province of China.
Primorsky Krai	165,900	Federal subject of Russia.
(Kazakhstan) Mangystau Province	165,600	Province of Kazakhstan.
Karakalpakstan	165,600	Largest region of Uzbekistan.
(Ömnögovi Province) Ömnögovi	165,400	Largest aimag of Mongolia.
Córdoba	165,321	Province of Argentina.
Kingdom of the Burgundians	164,166	A Germanic Kingdom in west-central France, lasting from 411-533.
(Saudi Arabia) Makkah Province	164,000	Province of Saudi Arabia.
Suriname	163,820	Country in South America.
Tunisia	163,610	Country in Africa.
(Algeria) Béchar Province	162,200	Province of Algeria.
Tyumen Oblast	161,800	Federal subject of Russia.
(Madagascar) Toliara Province	161,405	Largest Province of Madagascar.
(Namibia) ǁKaras Region	161,215	Largest region of Namibia.
Padania	160,908	Regional Area of Northern Italy as claimed by the Lega Nord
Perm Krai	160,600	Federal subject of Russia.
(Kenya) Eastern Province	159,891	Second largest Province of Kenya.
Amhara Region	159,174	Third largest region of Ethiopia.
(Algeria) Tindouf Province	159,000	Province of Algeria.
(Sudan) South Kordufan	158,355	State of Sudan.
Shan State	158,222	Largest state of Myanmar (Myanmar has certain administrative divisions titled as Divisions, and others titled as States).
(China) Shanxi	156,300	Province of China.
Odisha	155,707	State of India.
Salta	155,488	Province of Argentina.
Georgia (U.S. state)	153,909	State of the United States.
(China) Shandong	153,800	Province of China.
Central Kalimantan	153,564	Province of Indonesia.
Acre	152,581	State of Brazil.
(Mali) Kidal Region	151,430	Third largest region of Mali.
West Kazakhstan Province	151,300	Province of Kazakhstan.
(New Zealand) South Island	150,437	Largest island of New Zealand.
(Madagascar) Mahajanga Province	150,023	Second largest Province of Madagascar.
Old Assyrian period	150,000	An ancient Middle Eastern kingdom in the Fertile Crescent, lasting from 1920-1740 BC.
Illinois	149,998	State of the United States.
Coahuila	149,982	State of Mexico.
Mendoza	148,827	Province of Argentina.
Ceará	148,826	State of Brazil.
(Democratic Republic of the Congo) Bas-Uele	148,331	Province of the Democratic Republic of the Congo.
(Zambia) Northern Province	147,826	Largest province of Zambia.
(Botswana) Central District	147,730	Largest district of Botswana.
Nepal	147,181	Country in South Asia.
West Kalimantan	146,807	Province of Indonesia.
(China) Liaoning	145,900	Province of China.
Iowa	145,743	State of the United States.
Vologda Oblast	145,700	Federal subject of Russia.
(Niger) Zinder Department	145,430	Second largest department of Niger.
Murmansk Oblast	144,900	Federal subject of Russia.
(Iran) Razavi Khorasan province	144,681	Third largest province of Iran.
(Kazakhstan) Zhambyl Province	144,000	Province of Kazakhstan.
Bangladesh	143,998	Country in Southeast Asia.
Bashkortostan	143,600	Federal subject of Russia.
La Pampa	143,440	Province of Argentina.
Tajikistan	143,100	Country in Central Asia.
Amapá	142,815	State of Brazil.
(Govi-Altai Province) Govi-Altai	141,400	Second largest aimag of Mongolia.
New York	141,299	State of the United States.
Sindh	140,914	Third largest province of Pakistan.
(Niger) Diffa Department	140,216	Third largest department of Niger.
Omsk Oblast	139,700	Federal subject of Russia.
(China) Anhui	139,700	Province of China.
(Morocco) Laâyoune-Boujdour-Sakia El Hamra	139,480	Largest region of Morocco.
Republic of Yucatán	139,426	Sovereign country in North America, 1841–1848.
North Carolina	139,389	State of the United States.
(Saudi Arabia) Al Jawf Province	139,000	Province of Saudi Arabia.
(Indonesia) Java	138,794	Island of Indonesia.
(Turkmenistan) Balkan Province	138,000	Largest province of Turkmenistan.
Arkansas	137,732	State of the United States.
Santiago del Estero	136,351	Province of Argentina.
Alabama	135,765	State of the United States.
Chhattisgarh	135,194	State of India.
(Democratic Republic of the Congo) Tanganyika Province	134,940	Province of the Democratic Republic of the Congo.
Louisiana	134,264	State of the United States.
La Paz Department	133,985	Third largest department of Bolivia.
Santa Fe	133,007	Province of Argentina.
(Democratic Republic of the Congo) Tshuapa	132,940	Province of the Democratic Republic of the Congo.
(Democratic Republic of the Congo) Haut-Katanga Province	132,425	Province of the Democratic Republic of the Congo.
(Antártica Chilena Province) Magallanes and Antártica Chilena	132,297	Largest region of Chile (including Antarctic claims).
(Democratic Republic of the Congo) Maniema	132,250	Province of the Democratic Republic of the Congo.
Greece	131,957	Country in Europe.
England	130,395	Largest constituent country of the United Kingdom.
Tamil Nadu	130,058	State of India.
Nicaragua	130,000	Largest country in Central America; excludes San Andrés y Providencia islands (disputed territories with Colombia).
(Botswana) North-West District	129,930	Second largest district of Botswana.
Free State (South African province)	129,825	Third largest province of South Africa.
Kingdom of Poland	129,707	Medieval central European Kingdom, lasting from 1025-1569 when it formed a union with Lithuania. Size is approximate.
Western Cape	129,462	Province of South Africa.
(Iran) Yazd province	129,285	Province of Iran.
(Mozambique) Niassa Province	129,056	Largest province of Mozambique.
Czechoslovakia	127,900	Central European country between 1918 and 1992.
(Democratic Republic of the Congo) Mai-Ndombe Province	127,465	Province of the Democratic Republic of the Congo.
(Sudan) South Darfur	127,300	State of Sudan.
(Saudi Arabia) Northern Borders Region	127,000	Province of Saudi Arabia.
(Kenya) North Eastern Province	126,902	Third largest province of Kenya.
(Zambia) Western Province	126,386	Second largest province of Zambia.
(Zambia) North-Western Province	125,827	Third largest province of Zambia.
Limpopo	125,754	Province of South Africa.
Mississippi	125,434	State of the United States.
(Antofagasta Region) Antofagasta	125,306	Largest region of Chile (excluding Antarctic claims).
(Saudi Arabia) Ha'il Province	125,000	Province of Saudi Arabia.
(Kazakhstan) Pavlodar Province	124,800	Province of Kazakhstan.
Sarawak	124,450	Largest state of Malaysia.
Orenburg Oblast	124,000	Federal subject of Russia.
(Dornod Province) Dornod	123,600	Third largest aimag of Mongolia.
North Kazakhstan Province	123,200	Province of Kazakhstan.
Durango	123,181	State of Mexico.
(Morocco) Guelmim-Es Semara	122,825	Second largest region of Morocco.
(Iran) Fars province	122,608	Province of Iran.
(Sudan) Jungoli	122,479	State of Sudan.
(Tsardom of Bulgaria (1908–1946)) Kingdom of Bulgaria	122,134	Measured at apex before WWI.
(Sudan) River Nile	122,123	State of Sudan.
(Kazakhstan) Akmola Province	121,400	Province of Kazakhstan.
(Democratic Republic of the Congo) Lualaba Province	121,308	Province of the Democratic Republic of the Congo.
(China) Fujian	121,300	Province of China.
Kirov Oblast	120,800	Federal subject of Russia.
North Korea	120,538	Country in Asia.
Emirate of Granada	120,337	Moorish Vassal to the Kingdom of Castile lasting from 1228-1492, measured at its apex in 1228.
(Mali) Kayes Region	119,743	Region of Mali.
Overseas France	119,396	Consists of all the French-administered territories outside Europe.
Pennsylvania	119,283	State of the United States.
(Saudi Arabia) Najran Province	119,000	Province of Saudi Arabia.
South Kazakhstan Province	118,600	Province of Kazakhstan.
(Kazakhstan) Atyrau Province	118,600	Province of Kazakhstan.
Malawi	118,484	Country in Africa.
Potosí Department	118,218	Department of Bolivia.
(Botswana) Ghanzi District	117,910	Third largest district of Botswana.
Eritrea	117,600	Country in Africa. Includes Badme region.
Lake Michigan-Huron	117,300	Lake in North America, between Canada and the United States.
Ohio	116,096	State of the United States.
(Bayankhongor Province) Bayankhongor	116,000	Aimag of Mongolia.
Puntland	116,000	Historic region of Somalia.
(Greenland) Qeqqata	115,500	Second smallest municipality of Greenland.
(Namibia) Kunene Region	115,293	Second largest region of Namibia.
Telangana	114,840	A state of India, which was formed on 2 June 2014.
(Chad) Kanem	114,520	Second largest region of Chad.
Volgograd Oblast	113,900	Federal subject of Russia.
(New Zealand) North Island	113,729	Second largest island of New Zealand.
Benin	112,622	Country in Africa.
(Ethiopia) Southern Nations, Nationalities, and People's Region	112,343	Region of Ethiopia.
(Magallanes y la Antártica Chilena Region) Magallanes and Antártica Chilena	112,310	Second largest region of Chile (excluding Antarctic claims).
Honduras	112,088	Country in Central America.
Kingdom of Sicily	111,900	A medieval kingdom centered on the Island of Sicily and in southern Italy, lasting from 1130-1282.
Kingdom of the Two Sicilies	111,900	A kingdom centered on the Island of Sicily and in southern Italy, lasting from 1811-1861.
Liberia	111,369	Country in Africa.
Bulgaria	110,912	Country in Europe.
Cuba	110,861	Largest country in the Caribbean.
(Uzbekistan) Navoiy Region	110,800	Second largest region of Uzbekistan.
Virginia	110,785	State of the United States.
(Philippines) Luzon	109,965	Island of the Philippines.
(Amazonas (Colombian department)) Amazonas Department	109,665	Largest district of Colombia.
(Namibia) Hardap Region	109,651	Third largest region of Namibia.
(Dornogovi Province) Dornogovi	109,500	Aimag of Mongolia.
Tennessee	109,151	State of the United States.
(Cameroon) East Province	109,011	Largest province of Cameroon.
Guatemala	108,889	Country in Central America.
(Canada) Newfoundland	108,860	Island in Canada.
East Germany	108,333	Former country in Europe from 1949 to 1990; now reunified into Germany.
(Democratic Republic of the Congo) Haut-Lomami Province	108,204	Province of the Democratic Republic of the Congo.
(Saudi Arabia) Tabuk Province	108,000	Province of Saudi Arabia.
(Aysén Region) Aisén	107,153	Third largest region of Chile.
(Iran) Isfahan province	107,029	Province of Iran.
(Botswana) Kgalagadi District	106,940	District of Botswana.
(Niger) Tahoua Department	106,677	Department of Niger.
Cuba (main island)	105,806	Main island of the Caribbean country of Cuba.
(Namibia) Otjozondjupa	105,185	Region of Namibia.
(Mozambique) Zambezia Province	105,008	Second largest province of Mozambique.
(Democratic Republic of the Congo) Sankuru	105,000	Province of the Democratic Republic of the Congo.
(South Africa) North West	104,882	Province of South Africa.
Kentucky	104,659	State of the United States.
Kingdom of Aragon	103,088	Constituent Kingdom of Spain lasting from 1035-1515.
Iceland	103,000	Country in Europe.
Anangu Pitjantjatjara Yankunytjatja	103,000	Australian local government area
(Angola) Lunda Norte Province	102,783	Third largest province of Angola.
Catamarca	102,602	Province of Argentina.
(China) Jiangsu	102,600	Province of China.
(Madagascar) Fianarantsoa Province	102,373	Third largest Province of Madagascar.
(China) Zhejiang	102,000	Province of China.
(Department of Ucayali) Ucayali Region	101,831	Second largest region of Peru.
Rostov Oblast	100,800	Federal subject of Russia.
(Mozambique) Tete Province	100,724	Third largest province of Mozambique.
(Khövsgöl Province) Khövsgöl	100,600	Aimag of Mongolia.
Vichada Department	100,242	Second largest district of Colombia.
Saratov Oblast	100,200	Federal subject of Russia.

== See also ==
Other divisions

- 0.1 to 1,000,000+ square kilometers
- 1,000,000+ square kilometers

Smaller divisions

- 200,000+ square kilometers • 100,000 to 1,000,000 square kilometers • 50,000 to 200,000 square kilometers • 20,000 to 50,000 square kilometers
- 5,000 to 20,000 square kilometers • 1,000 to 5,000 square kilometers • 0.1 to 1,000 square kilometers
- 500,000 to 1,000,000 square kilometers • 200,000 to 500,000 square kilometers • 100,000 to 200,000 square kilometers
- 50,000 to 100,000 square kilometers • 30,000 to 50,000 square kilometers • 20,000 to 30,000 square kilometers • 10,000 to 20,000 square kilometers
- 7,000 to 10,000 square kilometers • 5,000 to 7,000 square kilometers • 3,000 to 5,000 square kilometers • 1,000 to 3,000 square kilometers
- 250 to 1,000 square kilometers • 50 to 250 square kilometers • Under 50 square kilometers

Other

- List of countries and dependencies by area
- List of largest empires
- List of administrative divisions by country
- Category:Ranked lists of country subdivisions
