= List of political and geographic subdivisions by total area from 500,000 to 1,000,000 square kilometers =

This is one of a series of comprehensive lists of continents, countries, and first level administrative country subdivisions such as states, provinces, and territories, as well as certain political and geographic features of substantial area. References for the information provided in this table may be found in the individual articles on each body listed herein. Some divisions are listed twice, with one listing including territory that is excluded in the other for various reasons, including territorial disputes. There is intentional overlap among the lists in order to maximize ease of use.

Geographic entity	Area (km^{2})	Notes
(Russia) West Siberian economic region	992,000	Economic Region of Russia.
(Nunavut) Qikiqtaaluk Region	989,879.35	Largest second-level administrative division in the world.
Manchukuo	984,195	A puppet state of the Empire of Japan, existed during 1932–1945.
South Australia	983,482	State of Australia.
Egypt	980,869	Country in Africa; excluding the Halaib Triangle.
Sea of Japan	978,000	Body of water between the Korean Peninsula to the west, Russia to the north, and Japan to the east.
Northeast Greenland National Park	972,000	Largest administrative division of Greenland; largest National Park in the world.
Argentine Antarctica	965,597	Argentine claim over Antarctica
Tanzania	945,087	Country in Africa. Includes the islands of Mafia, Pemba, and Zanzibar.
Argentine Sea	940,000	Body of water within the continental shelf off the Argentine mainland. It extends from Buenos Aires Province coast on the North to the Falkland Islands on the South.
British Columbia	925,186	Province of Canada. Land area only.
(Brazil) Southeast Region	924,511.3	One of the five official regions according to the IBGE. Includes the states of Espírito Santo, Minas Gerais, Rio de Janeiro, and São Paulo.
Nigeria	923,768	Country in Africa.
Merovengian Kingdom of Francia	918,881	The Frankish Kingdom after the conquest of Burgundy, lasting from 536-768.
Ontario	917,741	Second largest province of Canada. Land area only. With water area can excess 1,000,000
Venezuela	916,445	Country in South America; does not include claims of the Guyana–Venezuela territorial dispute. If included, the area would be 1,075,945 km^{2}.
Mato Grosso	903,358	State of Brazil.
Kalahari Desert	900,000	Semi-arid sandy savannah in Southern Africa.
Taymyrsky Dolgano-Nenetsky District	897,900	Largest second-level administrative divisions in Russia.
Pakistan (including disputed areas)	880,254	Country in South Asia. Includes Pakistani-administered disputed territories (Azad Kashmir and Northern Areas).
Grand Duchy of Lithuania	876,600	A large medieval pagan empire in Europe lasting from 1253-1569 as an independent state, prior to its union with Poland. Measured at its greatest extent in the 15th century.
(Libya) Cyrenaica	855,370	Eastern coastal region of Libya.
(Alaska) Unorganized Borough	837,700	Subdivided part of Alaska, largest "borough" of the state.
Namibia	824,292	Country in Africa.
(Russia) Ural economic region	824,000	Economic region of Russia.
Holy Roman Empire	814,415	Central European Confederacy from 962-1806. Measured at its largest extent under Ferdinand II, Holy Roman Emperor.
Mozambique	801,590	Country in Africa.
New South Wales	800,642	State of Australia.
Akkadian Empire	800,000	An ancient middle eastern empire centered on the Fertile Crescent, lasting from 2400-2200 BC.
Pakistan (non-disputed areas)	796,095	Country in South Asia. Excludes all disputed territories.
East China	795,837	A statistical region of China.
Northeast China (Without eastern Inner Mongolia)	793,300	A statistical region of China.
Khabarovsk Krai	788,600	Federal subject of Russia.
New Guinea	786,000	Island divided between Indonesia and Papua New Guinea.
Turkey	783,562	Country partly in Europe and partly in Asia.
(United States) East North Central states	780,541	Division of the United States. Contains the states of Michigan, Wisconsin, Illinois, Indiana, and Ohio.
Union between Sweden and Norway (United Kingdom of Sweden and Norway)	774,184	A Kingdom in Scandinavia between 1814-1905.
(Western Australia) Goldfields–Esperance	771,276	Largest region of Western Australia.
Irkutsk Oblast	767,900	Federal subject of Russia.
Evenkiysky District	763,200	Second largest second-level administrative divisions in Russia.
(United States) South Atlantic states	758,842	Division of the United States. Contains the states of Virginia, West Virginia, North Carolina, South Carolina, Georgia, Florida, Maryland, Delaware and District of Columbia.
Chile	756,096	Includes Easter Island (Isla de Pascua; Rapa Nui) and Isla Sala y Gómez, excludes claims on Antarctica (1,250,000 km^{2}).
Zambia	752,618	Country in Africa.
Aerican Empire	750,503	A self-proclaimed monarchist micronation in Canada.
Yamalo-Nenets Autonomous Okrug	750,300	Federal subject of Russia.
Scandinavian Peninsula	750,000	Peninsula in Europe, occupied by Norway and Sweden.
Borneo	748,168	Island divided between Brunei, Indonesia and Malaysia.
(Quebec) Nord-du-Québec	747,191.93	Largest subdivisions of Quebec.
Chukotka Autonomous Okrug	737,700	Federal subject of Russia.
(China) Qinghai	721,200	Largest province of China.
Oregon Territory	720,011	Territory acquired from Britain by the US in 1848.
Eastern Province, Saudi Arabia (Ash Sharqiyah)	710,000	Largest province of Saudi Arabia.
Texas	696,200	State of the United States.
Visigothic Kingdom	684,738	A Germanic Kingdom on the Iberian peninsula, lasting from 474-723. Measured at its apex in 500.
Austria-Hungary	676,615	Central European empire from 1867 to 1918.
Myanmar	676,578	Country in Southeast Asia.
Patagonian Desert	673,000	Largest desert in South America.
(Niger) Agadez Region	667,799	Largest region of Niger.
(Greenland) Qaasuitsup	660,000	Largest municipality of Greenland.
(Russia) Central Federal District	652,800	Federal district of Russia, created May 2000.
Afghanistan	652,090	Country in Central Asia.
(Brazil) (Argentina) (Paraguay) (Bolivia) Gran Chaco	647,000	Geographical region in South America.
France	643,801	Third largest European country (Metropolitan France only). While not fully part of France, the French Republic also includes French Overseas Collectivity and covers 674,843 km^{2}, excluding claims on Antarctica (432,000 km^{2}). With its overseas territories France precedes Ukraine as the second largest European country.
Alberta	642,317	Province of Canada. Land area only
Somalia	637,657	Country in Africa.
Nazi Germany	633,786	Nazi Germany encompasses present day Germany, and a few other territories.
Austrian Empire	625,418	A central European empire lasting from 1804-1867
(South Australia) Outback Communities Authority	624,339	Largest second level administrative division of Australia.
Central African Republic	622,984	Country in Africa.
South Sudan	619,745	Country in Africa.
Merovengian Kingdom of Francia	611,759	The Frankish Kingdom at its founding under Clovis I in 481.
Ukraine	603,700	Second largest European country.
(Chad) Borkou-Ennedi-Tibesti Region	600,350	Largest region of Chad.
Saskatchewan	591,670	Province of Canada. Land area only.
Arkhangelsk Oblast	589,200	Federal district of Russia, created May 2000.
Madagascar	587,041	Island country in Africa. Second largest country composed of a single island (after Australia).
Minas Gerais	586,528	State of Brazil.
Ostrogothic Kingdom	586,046	A Germanic Kingdom in Italy and Illyria after the fall of the Western Roman Empire, lasting from 476-553. Measurement is approximate.
Iberian Peninsula	581,471	A peninsula of Southwest Europe, occupied by Spain and Portugal.
Botswana	581,730	Country in Africa.
Kenya	580,367	Country in Africa.
(Brazil) South Region	576,409.6	One of the five official regions according to the IBGE. Includes the states of Paraná, Rio Grande do Sul, and Santa Catarina.
Caliphate of Córdoba	570,000	A Moorish Caliphate in Iberia after the local withdrawal of the Fatimid Caliphate, lasting from 756-1031.
Bahia	564,693	State of Brazil.
(Algeria) Tamanrasset Province	557,906	Largest province of Algeria.
Manitoba	553,556	Province of Canada. Land area only.
(Libya) Fezzan	551,700	Southwestern region of modern Libya.
Metropolitan France	551,500	The parts of France which are on the European Continent.
German Empire	540,000	The unified German state from 1871-1918.
(Saudi Arabia) Al-Ahsa Governorate	534,000	Largest second level administrative division of Saudi Arabia.
(Greenland) Sermersooq	531,900	Second largest second level administrative division of Greenland.
Yemen	527,968	Country in Middle East. Includes Perim, Socotra, the former Yemen Arab Republic (YAR or North Yemen), and the former People's Democratic Republic of Yemen (PDRY or South Yemen).
Khanty–Mansi Autonomous Okrug	523,100	Federal subject of Russia.
(Greenland) Avannaata	522,700	Third largest second level administrative division of Greenland.
Central America	521,499	Region between North America and South America.
Thailand	513,115	Country in Southeast Asia.
(Western Australia) Pilbara	771,276	Second largest region of Western Australia.
(Canada) Baffin Island	507,451	Island in Canadian Arctic.
Spain	506,030	Country in Europe. Includes mainland Spain, the Balearic Islands and Canary Islands, as well as the Spanish possessions (Plazas de Soberanía) off the coast of Morocco (Ceuta, Melilla, Islas Chafarinas, Peñón de Alhucemas, and Peñón de Vélez de la Gomera), and Isla de Alborán almost midway between Morocco and Spain, all the latter being claimed by Morocco, and the small enclave of Llívia totally surrounded by France. Excluding Gibraltar Which is part of the UK
Balkan Peninsula	505,000	Southeasternmost peninsula of Europe.
Atlantic Canada	500,531	Smallest main region of Canada.
Middle Kingdom of Egypt	500,000	Second Egyptian dynastic empire lasting from 2080-1640 BC.
Neo-Babylonian Empire	500,000	An ancient Middle Eastern empire centered on the Fertile Crescent, lasting from 626 to 539 BC.
Aztec Empire	500,000	A Meso-American Empire in Mexico lasting from 1325-1521.
Syrian Desert	500,000	Desert in the Middle East.

== See also ==
Other divisions

- 0.1 to 1,000,000+ square kilometers
- 1,000,000+ square kilometers

Smaller divisions

- 200,000+ square kilometers • 100,000 to 1,000,000 square kilometers • 50,000 to 200,000 square kilometers • 20,000 to 50,000 square kilometers
- 5,000 to 20,000 square kilometers • 1,000 to 5,000 square kilometers • 0.1 to 1,000 square kilometers
- 500,000 to 1,000,000 square kilometers • 200,000 to 500,000 square kilometers • 100,000 to 200,000 square kilometers
- 50,000 to 100,000 square kilometers • 30,000 to 50,000 square kilometers • 20,000 to 30,000 square kilometers • 10,000 to 20,000 square kilometers
- 7,000 to 10,000 square kilometers • 5,000 to 7,000 square kilometers • 3,000 to 5,000 square kilometers • 1,000 to 3,000 square kilometers
- 250 to 1,000 square kilometers • 50 to 250 square kilometers • Under 50 square kilometers

Other

- List of countries and dependencies by area
- List of largest empires
- List of administrative divisions by country
- Category:Ranked lists of country subdivisions
