= List of political and geographic subdivisions by total area from 200,000 to 500,000 square kilometers =

This is one of a series of comprehensive lists of continents, countries, and first level administrative country subdivisions such as states, provinces, and territories, as well as certain political and geographic features of substantial area. References for the information provided in this table may be found in the individual articles on each body listed herein. Some divisions are listed twice, with one listing including territory that is excluded in the other for various reasons, including territorial disputes. There is intentional overlap among the lists in order to maximize ease of use.

Geographic entity	Area (km^{2})	Notes
(Mali) Tombouctou Region	496,611	Largest region of Mali
Turkmenistan	488,100	Country in Central Asia
Denmark-Norway	487,476	A Scandinavian kingdom lasting from 1536 to 1814.
(China) Sichuan	485,000	Province of China.
(Libya) Kufra District	483,510	Largest district of Libya. The 32 districts were reorganized into 22 Sha'biyah in 2007, but Kufra appears to have retained its borders.
(Western Australia) Mid West	478,000	Third largest region of Western Australia.
Cameroon	475,442	Country in Africa.
(United States) East South Central states	475,014	Division of the United States. Contains the states of Alabama, Mississippi, Tennessee and Kentucky.
Yukon	474,391	Territory of Canada.
Kamchatka Krai	472,300	Federal subject of Russia.
(China) Bayingolin Mongol Autonomous Prefecture	471,526	Largest autonomous prefecture of China.
Northeastern United States	469,615	Region of the United States. Maine, New York, New Hampshire, Vermont, Massachusetts, Connecticut, Rhode Island, Pennsylvania and New Jersey.
Weimar Republic	468,787	German state from 1918 to 1933.
Papua New Guinea	462,840	Country in Oceania.
Magadan Oblast	461,400	Federal subject of Russia.
(China) Heilongjiang	454,800	Province of China.
(China) Gansu	453,700	Province of China.
(China) Nagqu	450,537	City of China.
Ross Dependency	450,000	New Zealand claim to Antarctica.
Sweden	449,964	Country in Europe. Includes Gotland and Öland.
Uzbekistan	447,400	Country in Central Asia; largest doubly landlocked country of the world.
Morocco	446,550	Country in Africa; excluding Western Sahara.
(Indonesia) Sumatra	443,066	Island in Indonesia.
Iraq	438,317	Country in Middle East.
(Russia) North Caucasus Economic Region (including disputed areas)	433,228	Economic region of Russia, including Sevastopol and the Republic of Crimea.
(French Southern and Antarctic Lands) Adélie Land	432,000	French claim to Antarctica; largest district of the French Southern and Antarctic Lands.
Zabaykalsky Krai	431,500	Federal subject of Russia.
(Kazakhstan) Karagandy Province	428,000	Largest province of Kazakhstan.
(Algeria) Adrar Province	427,368	Second largest province of Algeria.
(Western Australia) Kimberley	424,517	Most northern region of Western Australia.
California	423,970	State of the United States.
Papua	421,981	Province of Indonesia, status uncertain following Indonesian declaration of intent to subdivide into smaller provinces.
(Canada) Queen Elizabeth Islands	419,061	Subsection of islands in the Arctic Archipelago.
Komi Republic	415,900	Federal subject of Russia.
(Saudi Arabia) Riyadh Province	412,000	Second largest province of Saudi Arabia.
Arkhangelsk Oblast	410,700	Federal subject of Russia.
Gulf of Aden	410,000	Sea in between the Horn of Africa and the Arabian Peninsula.
Paraguay	406,752	Country in South America.
(Russia) North Caucasus Economic Region (non-disputed areas)	405,400	Economic region of Russia, not including Sevastopol and the Republic of Crimea.
Old Kingdom	400,000	The first unified Egyptian empire lasting from 2686–2134 BC.
Middle Assyrian period	400,000	An ancient Middle Eastern kingdom in the Fertile Crescent, lasting from 1365–1000 BC.
(China) Yunnan	394,000	Province of China.
(China) Nagqu	391,817	Largest prefecture-level city of China.
Zimbabwe	390,757	Country in Africa.
Kurdistan	390,000(Est.)	Region in the Middle East; homeland of the Kurds
Second Polish Republic	389,720	Country in Interwar Europe. Size accounts for area peak in 1939.
Norway (total)	385,155	Country in Europe. Includes mainland Norway (324,220 km^{2}) and the integral overseas areas of Svalbard and Jan Mayen (60,980 km^{2}); excludes the dependency of Bouvet Island (49 km^{2}) and the Antarctic dependency claims of Queen Maud Land and Peter I Island (~2,500,000 km^{2}).
Yukon-Koyukuk Census Area	382,810	Census area in the U.S. State of Alaska, largest county-equivalent in the United States.
Montana	380,838	State of the United States.
Japan	377,873	Country in Asia. Includes Ryukyu Islands (including Daitō Islands), Ogasawara Islands (Bonin Islands), Minami-Torishima (Marcus Island), Okino-Torishima and Volcano Islands (Kazan Islands); excludes the southern Kuril Islands.
Baltic Sea	377,000	Sea in Europe, bordered to the north by Sweden and Finland, to the east by Finland, Russia, Estonia, Latvia, and Lithuania, on the south by Poland and Germany, and on the West by Denmark.
New Valley Governorate	376,505	Largest governorate of Egypt.
Newfoundland and Labrador	373,872	Province of Canada.
(South Africa) Northern Cape	372,889	Largest province of South Africa.
Caspian Sea	371,000	Body of water in Central Asia variously classed as the world's largest lake or a full-fledged sea. Between Russia, Kazakhstan, Azerbaijan, Turkmenistan, and Iran.
Santa Cruz Department	370,621	Largest department of Bolivia.
Loreto Region	368,852	Largest region of Peru.
Amur Oblast	363,700	Federal subject of Russia.
Mato Grosso do Sul	357,125	State of Brazil.
Germany	357,022	Country in Europe; before the German reunification took place on 3 October 1990, Germany consisted of the former Federal Republic of Germany (FRG, West Germany) with 248,689 km^{2} and the German Democratic Republic (GDR, East Germany) with 108,333 km^{2}.
(Ethiopia) Oromia Region	353,632	Largest region of Ethiopia.
(Libya) Tripolitania	353,000	Historic region and former province of Libya.
(Buryatia) Buryat Republic	351,300	Federal subject of Russia.
Adélie Land	351,000	District French southern territories.
(Libya) Murzuq District	349,790	2nd largest district of Libya. The 32 districts were reorganized into 22 Sha'biyah in 2007, but Murzuq appears to have retained its borders.
Kingdom of Prussia	348,779	Former European kingdom-state between 1701 1918. Measured area from 1871.
(Sudan) Northern	348,765	Largest state of Sudan.
(Balochistan, Pakistan) Balochistan	347,190	Largest province of Pakistan.
Rajasthan	342,236	Largest state of India.
Republic of the Congo	342,000	Country in Africa.
Goiás	340,087	State of Brazil.
Finland	338,145	Country in Europe. Includes Åland.
South Yemen	332,970	Former country in the Middle East from 1967 to 1990; now reunified into Yemen.
Maranhão	331,983	State of Brazil.
Vietnam	331,689	Country in Southeast Asia.
Malaysia	329,847	Country in Southeast Asia.
(China) Haixi Mongol and Tibetan Autonomous Prefecture	325,785	Second largest autonomous prefecture of China.
Norway (excluding self-governing territories)	323,941	Country in Europe. Includes mainland Norway; excludes the integral overseas areas of Svalbard and Jan Mayen (60,980 km^{2}), the dependency of Bouvet Island (49 km^{2}) and the Antarctic dependency claims of Queen Maud Land and Peter I Island (~2,500,000 km^{2}).
Côte d'Ivoire	322,463	Country in Africa.
Tomsk Oblast	316,900	Federal subject of Russia.
British Isles	315,134	A series of islands in northern Europe.
New Mexico	314,915	State of the United States.
Poland	312,685	Country in Central Europe.
Oman	309,500	Country in Middle East.
Madhya Pradesh	308,144	State of India.
Maharashtra	307,713	State of India
Buenos Aires Province	307,571	Largest province of Argentina
Italy	301,318	Country in Europe
(Kazakhstan) Aktobe Province	300,600	Second-largest province of Kazakhstan.
Philippines	300,000	Country in Southeast Asia.
(Sudan) North Darfur	296,420	Second largest state of Sudan.
Arizona	295,254	State of the United States
Kingdom of Romania	295,049	Kingdom of Romania (1881–1947) at its greater extent in between 1919 and 1940
(Anadyrsky District) Anadyrsky	287,900	Administrative and municipal district of Chukotka.
Nevada	286,351	State of the United States
Yugoslavia	284,710	A Balkan country lasting from 1918 to 1992.
(Algeria) Illizi Province	284,618	Province of Algeria.
Ecuador	283,561	Country in South America. Includes Galápagos Islands.
East Kazakhstan Province	283,300	Third largest province of Kazakhstan.
(United States) Mid-Atlantic states	283,168	Division of the United States. New York, Pennsylvania and New Jersey.
Rio Grande do Sul	281,749	State of Brazil.
Somali Region	279,252	Second largest region of Ethiopia.
Tocantins	277,621	State of Brazil.
Andhra Pradesh	275,068	State of India.
Burkina Faso	274,000	Country in Africa.
New Zealand	270,534	Country in Oceania. Includes Antipodes Islands, Auckland Islands, Bounty Islands, Campbell Island, Chatham Islands, and Kermadec Islands. Excludes Niue (260 km^{2}), the Cook Islands (236 km^{2}) and Tokelau (12 km^{2}), as well as the Antarctic claim of Ross Dependency (450,000 km^{2}).
Colorado	269,601	State of the United States.
Gabon	267,668	Country in Africa.
Western Sahara	266,000	Country in Africa; largely occupied by Morocco, some territory administered by the Sahrawi Arab Democratic Republic.
(Russia) Volga-Vyatka	265,400	Economic Region of Russia.
Lake Agassiz	260,000	Former Largest glacial lake
Oregon	254,805	State of the United States.
Wyoming	253,348	State of the United States.
Michigan	253,266	State of the United States.
(Mauritania) Tiris Zemmour	252,900	Largest region of Mauritania.
Piauí	251,529	State of Brazil.
Serbian Empire	250,000	Serbian medieval empire from 1346–1371.
West Germany	248,689	Former country in Europe from 1949 to 1990; now reunified into Germany.
São Paulo	248,209	State of Brazil.
Guinea	245,857	Country in Africa.
North Slope Borough, Alaska	245,436	County of Alaska; largest county in the United States, and largest organized political subdivision that is not a state.
East Kalimantan	245,238	Province of Indonesia.
Chihuahua	244,938	Largest state of Mexico.
Great Lakes	244,100	Lake system in North America, predominately between Canada and the United States.
Santa Cruz	243,943	Second largest province of Argentina.
United Kingdom	242,900	Country in Europe. Excludes the three Crown dependencies (768 km^{2}), the 13 British overseas territories (17,027 km^{2}) and the British Antarctic Territory (1,395,000 km^{2}).
(Castile (historical region)) Crown of Castile	241,782	Royal union of Kingdoms in Spain lasting from 1230–1760, also known as the Kingdom of Castile y Leon.
Uganda	241,038	Country in Africa.
Uttar Pradesh	238,566	State of India.
Ghana	238,533	Country in Africa.
Romania	238,391	Country in Central Europe.
Bolívar	238,000	Largest state of Venezuela.
(China) Guangxi	237,600	Autonomous region of China.
Rondônia	237,576	State of Brazil.
Laos	236,800	Country in Southeast Asia.
Caribbean	234,917	Also known as the West Indies, all the islands of the Caribbean Sea including the Greater Antilles, the Lesser Antilles and the Lucayan Archipelago.
Sichuan Basin	229,500	Lowland region in southwestern China.
Victoria	227,146	State of Australia.
(Kazakhstan) Kyzylorda Province	226,000	Province of Kazakhstan.
Minnesota	225,365	State of the United States.
(Japan) Honshu	225,800	The biggest of the four main islands of Japan.
Chubut	224,686	Third largest province of Argentina.
Roraima	224,299	State of Brazil.
(Kazakhstan) Almaty Province	224,000	Province of Kazakhstan.
Korea	223,915	Peninsular region in East Asia.
(Angola) Moxico Province	223,023	Largest province of Angola.
Jammu and Kashmir	222,236	State of India.
North Kurdufan	221,900	Third largest state of Sudan.
Korea	220,186	Country in Asia prior to 1948; now divided into North Korea and South Korea.
Utah	219,887	State of the United States.
Kingdom of Hungary	218,915	A European Kingdom lasting from 1000–1804. Measured at its apex in 1450.
(Sudan) Red Sea	218,887	State of Sudan.
(Canada) Victoria Island	217,291	Second-largest island in the Arctic Archipelago.
Idaho	216,446	State of the United States.
(Mauritania) Adrar	215,300	Second largest region of Mauritania.
Guyana	214,969	Country in South America.
Beni Department	213,564	Second largest department of Bolivia.
Kansas	213,096	State of the United States.
(Matrouh Governorate) Matruh Governorate	212,112	Second largest governorate of Egypt.
(Algeria) Ouargla Province	211,980	Province of Algeria.
(China) Hunan	210,000	Province of China.
Great Britain	209,331	An island of the British Isles, largest of that group.
Belarus	207,600	Largest landlocked country in Europe.
Greater Antilles	207,435	An island grouping in the Caribbean.
(China) Shaanxi	205,600	Province of China.
(Punjab, Pakistan) Punjab	205,344	Second largest province of Pakistan.
Red Sea Governorate	203,685	Third largest governorate of Egypt.
Río Negro	203,013	Province of Argentina.
Nebraska	200,345	State of the United States.

== See also ==
Other divisions

- 0.1 to 1,000,000+ square kilometers
- 1,000,000+ square kilometers

Smaller divisions

- 200,000+ square kilometers • 100,000 to 1,000,000 square kilometers • 50,000 to 200,000 square kilometers • 20,000 to 50,000 square kilometers
- 5,000 to 20,000 square kilometers • 1,000 to 5,000 square kilometers • 0.1 to 1,000 square kilometers
- 500,000 to 1,000,000 square kilometers • 200,000 to 500,000 square kilometers • 100,000 to 200,000 square kilometers
- 50,000 to 100,000 square kilometers • 30,000 to 50,000 square kilometers • 20,000 to 30,000 square kilometers • 10,000 to 20,000 square kilometers
- 7,000 to 10,000 square kilometers • 5,000 to 7,000 square kilometers • 3,000 to 5,000 square kilometers • 1,000 to 3,000 square kilometers
- 250 to 1,000 square kilometers • 50 to 250 square kilometers • Under 50 square kilometers

Other

- List of countries and dependencies by area
- List of largest empires
- List of administrative divisions by country
- Category:Ranked lists of country subdivisions
