= Lists of political and geographic subdivisions by total area =

This is an index of a series of comprehensive lists of continents, countries, and first level administrative country subdivisions such as states, provinces, and territories, as well as certain political and geographic features of substantial area. Due to the substantial size of these lists, references for the information provided in this table may generally be found in the individual articles on each of the bodies listed therein. Some divisions are listed twice, with one listing including territory that is excluded in the other for various reasons, including territorial disputes. There is intentional overlap between the lists in order to maximize ease of use.

== Longer lists ==
- List of political and geographic subdivisions by total area (all)
- List of political and geographic subdivisions by total area in excess of 200,000 square kilometers
- List of political and geographic subdivisions by total area from 100,000 to 1,000,000 square kilometers
- List of political and geographic subdivisions by total area from 50,000 to 200,000 square kilometers
- List of political and geographic subdivisions by total area from 20,000 to 50,000 square kilometers
- List of political and geographic subdivisions by total area from 5,000 to 20,000 square kilometers
- List of political and geographic subdivisions by total area from 1,000 to 5,000 square kilometers
- List of political and geographic subdivisions by total area from 0.1 to 1,000 square kilometers

== Shorter lists ==
- List of political and geographic subdivisions by total area in excess of 1,000,000 square kilometers
- List of political and geographic subdivisions by total area from 500,000 to 1,000,000 square kilometers
- List of political and geographic subdivisions by total area from 200,000 to 500,000 square kilometers
- List of political and geographic subdivisions by total area from 100,000 to 200,000 square kilometers
- List of political and geographic subdivisions by total area from 50,000 to 100,000 square kilometers
- List of political and geographic subdivisions by total area from 30,000 to 50,000 square kilometers
- List of political and geographic subdivisions by total area from 20,000 to 30,000 square kilometers
- List of political and geographic subdivisions by total area from 10,000 to 20,000 square kilometers
- List of political and geographic subdivisions by total area from 7,000 to 10,000 square kilometers
- List of political and geographic subdivisions by total area from 5,000 to 7,000 square kilometers
- List of political and geographic subdivisions by total area from 3,000 to 5,000 square kilometers
- List of political and geographic subdivisions by total area from 1,000 to 3,000 square kilometers
- List of political and geographic subdivisions by total area from 250 to 1,000 square kilometers
- List of political and geographic subdivisions by total area from 50 to 250 square kilometers
- List of political and geographic subdivisions by total area under 50 square kilometers

== See also ==
- List of countries and dependencies by area
- List of administrative divisions by country
- Category:Ranked lists of country subdivisions
- List of largest empires
- Orders of magnitude (area)
