= South Georgia and the South Sandwich Islands sovereignty dispute =

International dispute between Argentina and the UK

Location of South Georgia and the South Sandwich Islands (red and white), alongside the United Kingdom (white), with Argentina (beige) claiming them.

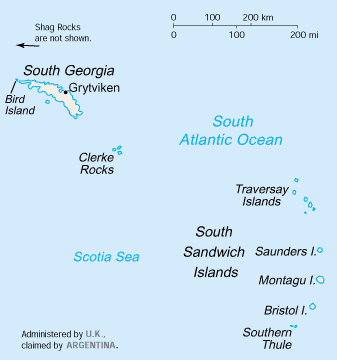
Map of South Georgia and the South Sandwich Islands

British sovereignty of South Georgia and the South Sandwich Islands is disputed by Argentina. The United Kingdom claimed South Georgia in 1775 (at the time it was the Kingdom of Great Britain), annexed the islands in 1908, and has exercised de facto control with the exception of a brief period during the Falklands War in 1982, when the islands were partially controlled by Argentina. The dispute started in 1927 when Argentina claimed sovereignty over South Georgia, and subsequently expanded in scope with Argentina claiming the South Sandwich Islands in 1938. The islands have no indigenous population, and currently only have about 30 inhabitants.

== History of the claims ==
=== Origins of the British claim ===
The South Georgia archipelago was first claimed for Great Britain by James Cook in January 1775, having been previously discovered by Englishman Anthony de la Roché. However, the British did little to enforce this claim until 1843, when Letters Patent was issued to provide for the government of the islands, which were to be governed as a Falkland Islands Dependency. These were revised in 1876 and 1892.

In 1908, following inquiries regarding the sovereignty of the area currently covered by the British Antarctic Territory from the Norwegian government, the British government stated that the islands were British, and issued Letters Patent to include "South Orkney, South Georgia and South Shetland islands, and Graham Land situated in the South Atlantic Ocean to the south of the 50th parallel of south latitude and lying between the 20th and 80th degrees of west longitude" as Falkland Islands Dependencies. It was made clear at this time that the association with the Falkland Islands was intended as an administrative convenience.

As it had been observed within the British government that a literal interpretation of this claim would include parts of the South American mainland, the letters patent were clarified on 28 March 1917, redefining the limits to exclude all territories north of 58°S and west of 50°W, but to otherwise include all land in this region. Though the Argentine government was given details of the 1908 letters patent (at their request), neither Argentina nor Chile objected to either claim.

=== Origins of the Argentine claim ===
The Compañía Argentina de Pesca (CAP), an Argentine-registered whaling company run by Norwegian Carl Anton Larsen, was the first company to set up operations on South Georgia in 1904. This company founded the settlement of Grytviken and its employees (including Larsen himself) became the first permanent residents of the island. In 1905, the Argentine government authorised a weather station on the island.

In 1906, the CAP signed a lease with the Falkland Islands government, and following the 1908 annexation the company started to use British whaling licences and leases for land at Grytviken and Jason Harbour. Also in 1908, the CAP started looking to the South Sandwich Islands for the expansion of their business. Larsen adopted British citizenship in 1910. Argentina's first explicit claim to South Georgia was made in 1927 and to the South Sandwich Islands in 1938.

=== Later developments ===
Following the Argentine claims, the UK offered (in 1947, 1951, 1953 and 1954) to take the matter to the International Court of Justice in The Hague but this was turned down by Argentina. When the United Kingdom took the issue to the court unilaterally in 1955, Argentina declined to cooperate, citing a lack of jurisdiction. The British divided the Falkland Islands dependencies in 1962, in accordance with the newly signed Antarctic Treaty. Those areas south of 60°S became the British Antarctic Territory, while the remainder – South Georgia and the South Sandwich Islands – retained their previous status.

=== Falklands War ===
Argentina established a base, Corbeta Uruguay, on Thule Island at the far south of the South Sandwich Islands in November 1976. When this base was discovered by the British that December, the British protested diplomatically, and sent a task force (Operation Journeyman) to protect the Falkland Islands from potential invasion.

On 19 March 1982, a group of 50 Argentines posing as scrap metal merchants landed at Leith Harbour on South Georgia aboard the ARA Bahía Buen Suceso and hoisted the Argentine flag. The British government responded by sending HMS Endurance with 22 Royal Marines to expel the Argentines, but they were held off to avoid increasing the tension. Further Argentine troops, led by Lieutenant Alfredo Astiz (known as the "blond angel of death") were landed and the British set up a station to monitor the activities there. Argentine forces invaded the Falkland Islands on 2 April 1982 and took Grytviken the following day, leaving 44 marines. Despite seizing Grytviken and Leith, the Argentines were not able to take the entire island and several British Antarctic Survey field camps remained in the hands of the United Kingdom throughout the length of the war.

In response to the Argentine invasion, the British launched Operation Corporate (the recapture of the Falkland Islands) of which Operation Paraquet was part. Royal Marines retook Grytviken in two hours on 25 April 1982 using intelligence from the SBS who had infiltrated the island, following an attack on the ARA Santa Fe by Royal Naval helicopters. The garrison at Leith Harbour surrendered the following day, and Corbeta Uruguay surrendered on 20 June 1982. It was demolished that December.

=== Current status ===
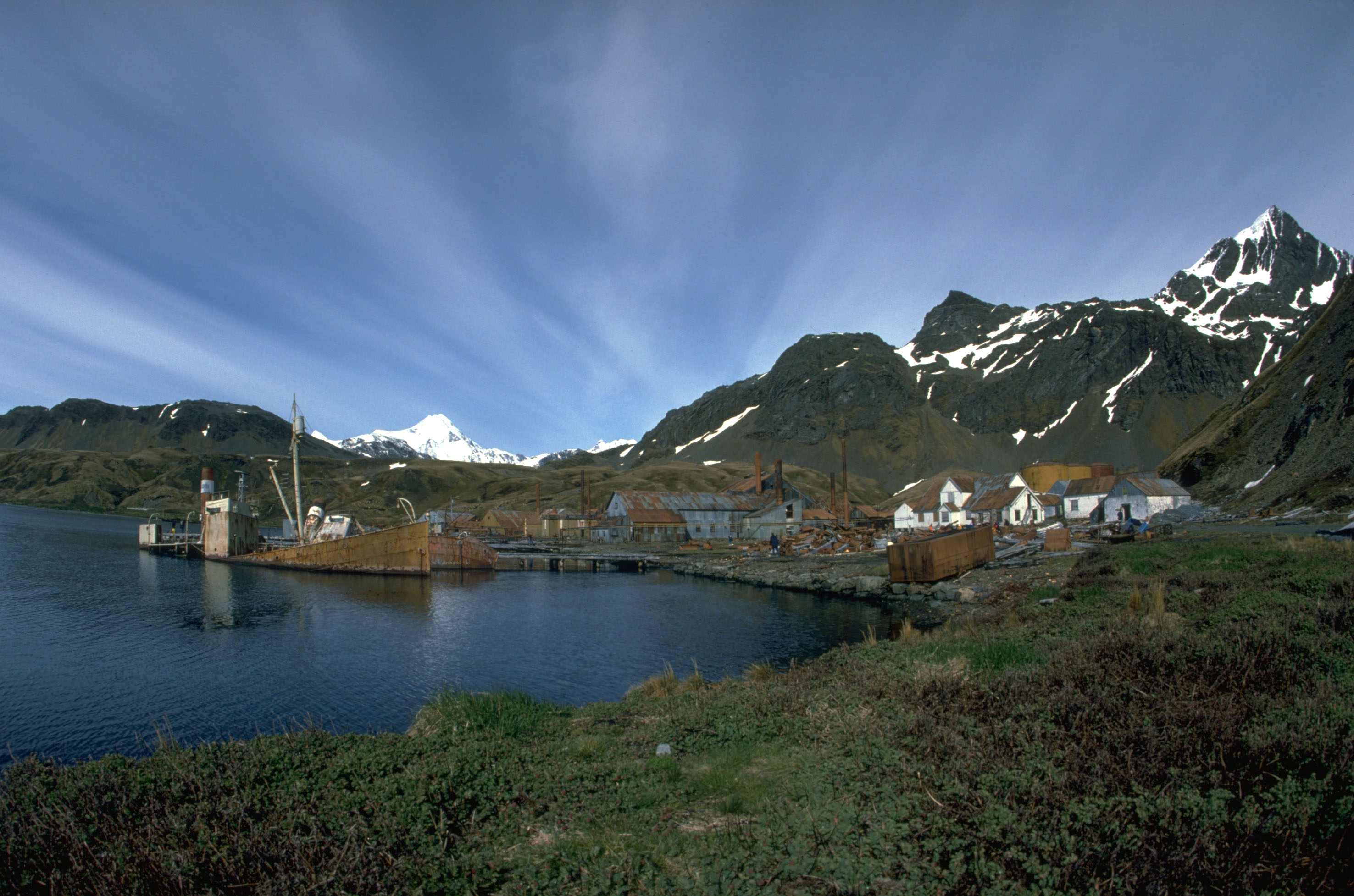
Grytviken in 1989

The United Kingdom has administered South Georgia and the South Sandwich Islands separately from the Falklands since the islands were made a British dependent territory in their own right in 1985. The status of the territory was altered by the British Overseas Territories Act 2002, and the terminology now used is British overseas territory.

Argentina considers the islands to be part of the Islas del Atlántico Sur Department of Tierra del Fuego Province. The claim to South Georgia and the South Sandwich Islands is written into the 1994 Argentine constitution alongside the claim to the Falkland Islands.

== Current claims ==
=== Claims by Argentina ===
Argentina claims that:

- Argentina has, since 1927, protested every British action that it has known about that contradicted Argentine sovereignty of South Georgia and the South Sandwich Islands.

=== Claims by the United Kingdom ===
The United Kingdom claims that:

- South Georgia was claimed for Great Britain under Captain Cook in 1775.
- The United Kingdom annexed South Georgia and the South Sandwich Islands in 1908.
- Whaling stations on the islands (including the CAP) operated under British licence.
- The islands have been administered legally by the United Kingdom since 1908, with the exception of being "briefly occupied by Argentinean forces in 1982".

== See also ==
- Falkland Islands sovereignty dispute
- South American territorial disputes
