= List of administrative divisions by country =

World map showing first-level divisions for every country

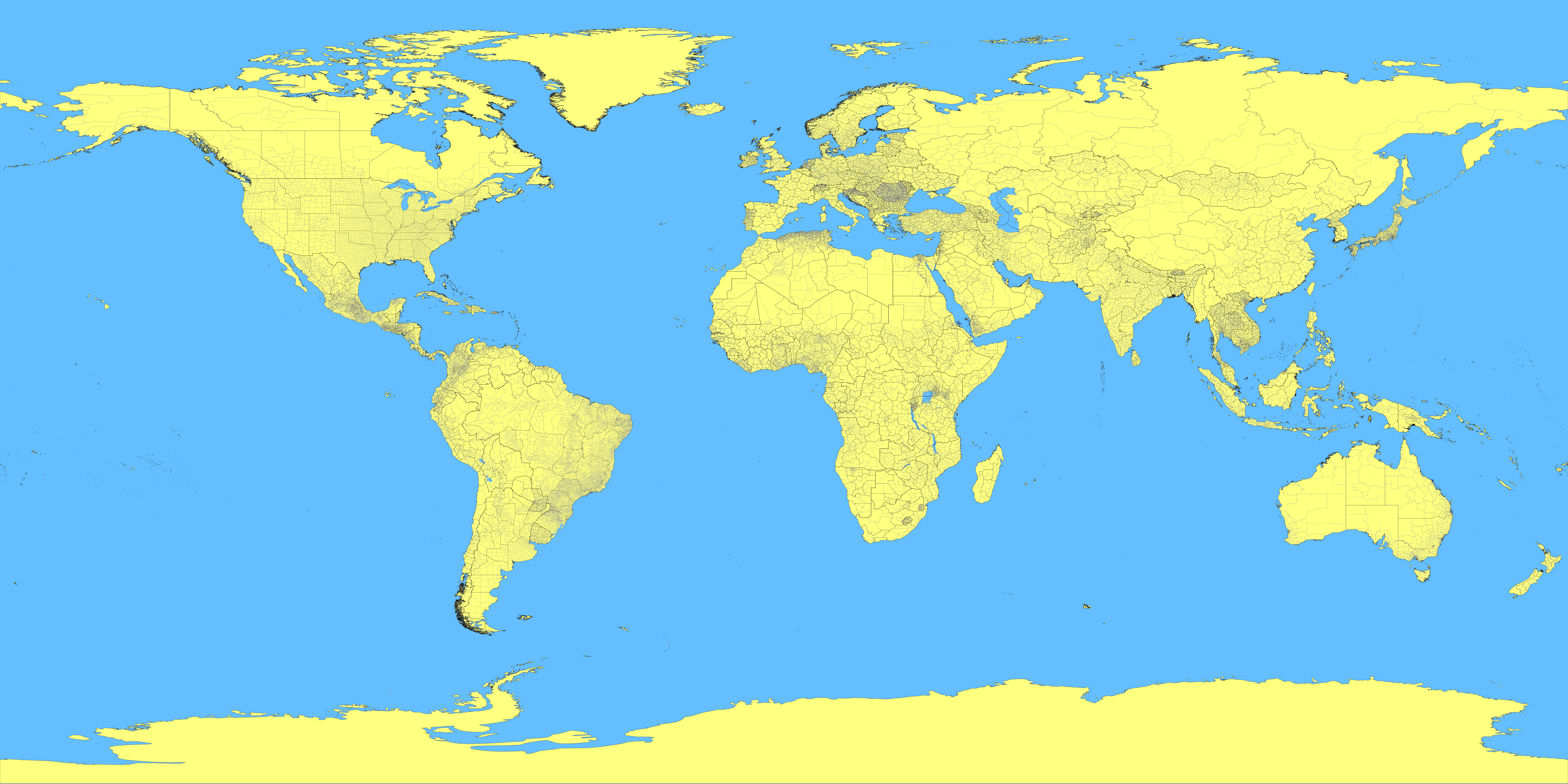
World map showing Global Administrative Unit Layers second-level subdivisions

== Administrative divisions by sovereign state ==
=== Legend ===
- The "Type" column indicates a federation (which includes lower-level units that exercise some sovereignty), unitary state (where the highest-level entity is the only sovereign), or regional state (unitary with substantial delegation of power)
- Terms in italics are terms in languages other than English, in plural form (except languages that take the singular form with numbers, such as Hungarian).
- Square brackets indicate a term that has not yet been confirmed.

The table below indicates the types and, where known, numbers of administrative divisions used by countries and their major dependent territories:

=== Member and observer states of the United Nations ===
Country	Type	Administrative divisions				
Country	Type	First-level	Second-level	Third-level	Fourth-level	Fifth-level+
Afghanistan	Unitary	34 provinces (velaya'at)	421 districts (woleswali)	subdistricts (alaqadari)	* villages (kali) * neighborhoods (gawandi)	
Albania	Unitary	12 counties (qarqe)	61 municipalities (bashki)	373 units of local governance (njësite të qeverisjes vendore)	2,972 villages (fshatra)	
Algeria	Unitary	69 provinces (wilayat)	547 districts (daïras)	1,541 communes (baladiyahs)	localities	
Andorra	Unitary	7 parishes (parròquies)	53 populated places (llocs poblats or poblacions): * quarters (quarts) * neighbourhoods (veinats) in Canillo			
Angola	Unitary	21 provinces (províncias)	326 municipalities (municípios)	618 communes (comunas)	villages (aldeias)	
Antigua and Barbuda	Unitary	6 parishes	15 divisions 8 districts	116 communities	353 localities	
Antigua and Barbuda	Unitary	2 dependencies	15 divisions 8 districts	116 communities	353 localities	
Argentina	Federal	23 provinces (provincias)	378 departments (departamentos) (Note: Including 2 departments of disputed sovereignty in Tierra del Fuego Province: Argentine Antarctica and South Atlantic Islands (the latter includes the Falkland Islands and South Georgia and the South Sandwich Islands))	1,218 municipalities (municipios); 559 communes ("comunas"); 113 rural communes ("comunas rurales"); 110 developmental commissions ("comisiones de fomento"); 178 municipal commissions ("comisiones municipales"); 138 governing boards ("juntas de gobierno")	localities (localidades) settlements (asentamientos)	
Argentina	Federal	23 provinces (provincias)	135 partidos (Note: Buenos Aires Province only)	1,218 municipalities (municipios); 559 communes ("comunas"); 113 rural communes ("comunas rurales"); 110 developmental commissions ("comisiones de fomento"); 178 municipal commissions ("comisiones municipales"); 138 governing boards ("juntas de gobierno")	localities (localidades) settlements (asentamientos)	
Argentina	Federal	1 autonomous city:				
Argentina	Federal	Buenos Aires	15 communes (comunas)		48 neighbourhoods (barrios)	
Armenia	Unitary	10 provinces (marzer)	70 municipalities (hamaynkner)			
Armenia	Unitary	1 autonomous city:				
Armenia	Unitary	Yerevan	12 districts			
Australia	Federal	6 states:				
Australia	Federal	New South Wales	58 shires	wards (electoral unit)	suburbs [urban] and localities [rural]	
Australia	Federal	New South Wales	28 cities	wards (electoral unit)	suburbs [urban] and localities [rural]	
Australia	Federal	New South Wales	28 councils	wards (electoral unit)	suburbs [urban] and localities [rural]	
Australia	Federal	New South Wales	8 regional councils	wards (electoral unit)	suburbs [urban] and localities [rural]	
Australia	Federal	New South Wales	6 municipalities	wards (electoral unit)	suburbs [urban] and localities [rural]	
Australia	Federal	New South Wales	2 unincorporated areas	wards (electoral unit)	suburbs [urban] and localities [rural]	
Australia	Federal	Queensland	30 regions	wards (electoral unit)	suburbs [urban] and localities [rural]	
Australia	Federal	Queensland	28 shires	wards (electoral unit)	suburbs [urban] and localities [rural]	
Australia	Federal	Queensland	12 Aboriginal shires	wards (electoral unit)	suburbs [urban] and localities [rural]	
Australia	Federal	Queensland	7 cities	wards (electoral unit)	suburbs [urban] and localities [rural]	
Australia	Federal	Queensland	1 town	wards (electoral unit)	suburbs [urban] and localities [rural]	
Australia	Federal	South Australia	25 district councils	wards (electoral unit)	suburbs [urban] and localities [rural]	
Australia	Federal	South Australia	21 cities	wards (electoral unit)	suburbs [urban] and localities [rural]	
Australia	Federal	South Australia	15 councils	wards (electoral unit)	suburbs [urban] and localities [rural]	
Australia	Federal	South Australia	5 Aboriginal councils	wards (electoral unit)	suburbs [urban] and localities [rural]	
Australia	Federal	South Australia	4 regional councils	wards (electoral unit)	suburbs [urban] and localities [rural]	
Australia	Federal	South Australia	2 towns	wards (electoral unit)	suburbs [urban] and localities [rural]	
Australia	Federal	South Australia	1 rural city	wards (electoral unit)	suburbs [urban] and localities [rural]	
Australia	Federal	South Australia	1 unincorporated area	wards (electoral unit)	suburbs [urban] and localities [rural]	
Australia	Federal	Tasmania	23 municipalities	wards (electoral unit)	suburbs [urban] and localities [rural]	
Australia	Federal	Tasmania	6 cities	wards (electoral unit)	suburbs [urban] and localities [rural]	
Australia	Federal	Victoria	39 shires	wards (electoral unit)	suburbs [urban] and localities [rural]	
Australia	Federal	Victoria	33 cities	wards (electoral unit)	suburbs [urban] and localities [rural]	
Australia	Federal	Victoria	10 unincorporated areas	wards (electoral unit)	suburbs [urban] and localities [rural]	
Australia	Federal	Victoria	6 rural cities	wards (electoral unit)	suburbs [urban] and localities [rural]	
Australia	Federal	Victoria	1 borough	wards (electoral unit)	suburbs [urban] and localities [rural]	
Australia	Federal	Western Australia	104 shires	wards (electoral unit)	suburbs [urban] and localities [rural]	
Australia	Federal	Western Australia	29 cities	wards (electoral unit)	suburbs [urban] and localities [rural]	
Australia	Federal	Western Australia	8 towns	wards (electoral unit)	suburbs [urban] and localities [rural]	
Australia	Federal	2 internal territories that are self-governing:				
Australia	Federal	Australian Capital Territory				
Australia	Federal	Northern Territory	9 regional councils	wards (electoral unit)	suburbs [urban] and localities [rural]	
Australia	Federal	Northern Territory	5 unincorporated areas	wards (electoral unit)	suburbs [urban] and localities [rural]	
Australia	Federal	Northern Territory	3 municipalities	wards (electoral unit)	suburbs [urban] and localities [rural]	
Australia	Federal	Northern Territory	3 shires	wards (electoral unit)	suburbs [urban] and localities [rural]	
Australia	Federal	Northern Territory	2 cities	wards (electoral unit)	suburbs [urban] and localities [rural]	
Australia	Federal	1 internal territory that is not self-governing:				
Australia	Federal	Jervis Bay Territory				
Australia	Federal	7 external territories:				
Australia	Federal	Ashmore and Cartier Islands				
Australia	Federal	Australian Antarctic Territory (Note: Claim frozen by the Antarctic Treaty.)				
Australia	Federal	Christmas Island	1 shire			
Australia	Federal	Cocos (Keeling) Islands	1 shire			
Australia	Federal	Coral Sea Islands				
Australia	Federal	Heard Island and McDonald Islands				
Australia	Federal	Norfolk Island				
Austria	Federal	9 states (Bundesländer)	94 districts (Bezirke) (Note: Not counting Vienna being a state, a district and a statutory city) (Note: The districts of Vienna are not considered to be administrative subdivisions of any level.) (Note: Including 14 statutory cities (Statutarstädte))	2,095 municipalities (Gemeinden) (Note: Not counting statutory cities) (Note: Including 186 towns (Städte), and 771 market towns (Marktgemeinden))	villages (Ortschaften)	
Azerbaijan	Unitary	57 districts (rayonlar) 10 cities of republican significance (respublika tabeli şəhər)	12 city districts (şəhər rayonları)	1,857 administrative-territorial circuits (inzibati ərazi dairələri)	4,374 settlements (yaşayış məntəqələri)	
Azerbaijan	Unitary	Nakhchivan Autonomous Republic:				
Azerbaijan	Unitary	7 districts (rayonlar) 1 cities of republican significance (respublika tabeli şəhər)		166 administrative-territorial circuits (inzibati ərazi dairələri)	212 settlements (yaşayış məntəqələri)	
The Bahamas	Unitary	33 districts	32+ town committees			
The Bahamas	Unitary	New Providence	24 supervisory districts			
Bahrain	Unitary	4 governorates (muḥāfaẓāt)				
Bangladesh	Unitary	8 divisions (bibhag)	64 districts (zila)	495 sub-districts (upazila); 12 City corporations	4,596 union councils (union parishads); 327 municipal corporations (paurasabhas)	
Barbados	Unitary	11 parishes				
Belarus	Unitary	6 regions (oblasti or voblastsi)	118 districts (raiony)			
Belarus	Unitary	1 autonomous city:				
Belarus	Unitary	Minsk				
Belgium	Federal	3 communities (Dutch: gemeenschappen; French: communautés; German: Gemeinschaften) (Note: Belgium has a complex system of federalism where language community and regional governments exercise different powers over often the same geographical areas in parallel.)				
Belgium	Federal	3 regions (Dutch: gewesten; French: régions; German: Regionen):				
Belgium	Federal	Brussels-Capital (Region)	Brussels-Capital (Region) at the Provincial level, the region is taken to fill the gap in a map, but Brussels isn't called a Province.	Brussels-Capital (Arrondissement)	Brussels (City)	Brussels (municipal section)
Belgium	Federal	Flanders; Wallonia	10 provinces (Note: The Brussels-Capital Region is not divided into provinces.) (Dutch: provincies; French: provinces; German: Provinzen)	43 arrondissements (Dutch: arrondissementen; French: arrondissements; German: Arrondisements)	565 municipalities (Dutch: gemeenten; French: communes; German: Gemeinden)	2616 municipal sections (Dutch: deelgemeenten; French: sections de communes; German: Teilgemeinde)
Belize	Unitary	6 districts	247 municipalities			
Benin	Unitary	12 departments (départements)	77 communes (communes)	545 districts (arrondissements)		
Bhutan	Unitary	20 districts (dzongkhag)	205 blocks (gewogs)	1,044 chiwogs	5,000+ villages (yue or depa)	
Bhutan	Unitary	20 districts (dzongkhag)	61 "thromdes"			
Bolivia	Regional	9 departments (departamentos)	112 provinces (provincias)	340 municipalities (municipios)		
Bosnia and Herzegovina	Federal	2 federal entities:				
Bosnia and Herzegovina	Federal	Federation of Bosnia and Herzegovina	10 cantons (kantona)	79 municipalities (općine or opštine)	local communities	
Bosnia and Herzegovina	Federal	Republika Srpska (Note: lit. 'Serb Republic')	6 regions	64 municipalities (opštine)	local communities	
Bosnia and Herzegovina	Federal	1 condominium of the federal entities:				
Bosnia and Herzegovina	Federal	Brčko District				
Botswana	Unitary	10 rural districts	23 sub-districts (Note: Chobe District and all six of Botswana's urban districts are not divided into second-level administrative subdivisions.)	519 villages	localities	
Botswana	Unitary	7 urban districts	23 sub-districts	519 villages	localities	
Brazil	Federal	26 states (estados)	5,569 municipalities (municípios) 1 state district (distrito estadual)	10,751 municipal districts (distritos municipais)	611 municipal subdistricts (subdistritos municipais)	
Brazil	Federal	1 federal district (distrito federal)	1 federal capital (capital federal)	10,751 municipal districts (distritos municipais)	35 administrative regions (regiões administrativas)	
Brunei	Unitary	4 districts (daerah)	39 subdistricts (mukim)	406 villages (kampung)		
Bulgaria	Unitary	28 provinces or regions (oblasti, области)	265 municipalities (obshtini, общини)	villages (selo, село)		
Burkina Faso	Unitary	17 regions (régions)	45 provinces	325 departments (départements) (Note: Consisting of urban and rural communes)	* villages (villages) * neighbourhoods (quartiers)	
Burundi	Unitary	5 provinces	42 communes	3,044 collines (Note: lit. 'hills')		
Cambodia	Unitary	24 provinces (khaet)	163 districts (srok and khan)	1,652 communes and quarters (khum and sangkat)	14,578 villages (phum)	blocks (krŏm)
Cambodia	Unitary	24 provinces (khaet)	33 municipalities (krong)	1,652 communes and quarters (khum and sangkat)	14,578 villages (phum)	blocks (krŏm)
Cambodia	Unitary	1 autonomous municipality (reachtheani): (Note: lit. 'capital')		1,652 communes and quarters (khum and sangkat)	14,578 villages (phum)	blocks (krŏm)
Cambodia	Unitary	Phnom Penh	14 sections (khan)	1,652 communes and quarters (khum and sangkat)	14,578 villages (phum)	blocks (krŏm)
Cameroon	Unitary	10 regions (régions)	58 departments (départements)	360 communes, or districts (arrondissements)	* villages (villages) * localities (localités)	
Canada	Federal	10 provinces:				
Canada	Federal	Alberta	264 municipalities			
Canada	Federal	Alberta	8 Metis settlements			
Canada	Federal	Alberta	63 counties	403 hamlets		
Canada	Federal	Alberta	7 improvement districts (Note: Improvement districts are almost always coterminous with a national or provincial park.)	403 hamlets		
Canada	Federal	Alberta	6 specialized municipalities	403 hamlets		
Canada	Federal	Alberta	3 special areas	403 hamlets		
Canada	Federal	British Columbia	27 regional districts	162 municipalities 160 electoral areas		
Canada	Federal	British Columbia	1 unincorporated area	162 municipalities 160 electoral areas		
Canada	Federal	Manitoba	98 rural municipalities	37 municipalities 2 local government districts		
Canada	Federal	Manitoba	unincorporated areas (Note: With the exceptions of Riding Mountain National Park, and Duck Mountain Provincial Park and Forest, the vast majority of unincorporated areas in the province are within Northern Manitoba.) (Note: Statistics Canada divides the province into census divisions that do cover Northern Manitoba, however, these serve no provincial or local governmental functions.)	37 municipalities 2 local government districts		
Canada	Federal	New Brunswick	12 regional service commissions	8 cities		
Canada	Federal	New Brunswick	12 regional service commissions	28 towns		
Canada	Federal	New Brunswick	12 regional service commissions	21 villages		
Canada	Federal	New Brunswick	12 regional service commissions	1 regional municipality		
Canada	Federal	New Brunswick	12 regional service commissions	17 rural communities		
Canada	Federal	New Brunswick	12 regional service commissions	12 rural districts		
Canada	Federal	Newfoundland and Labrador	277 municipalities			
Canada	Federal	Nova Scotia	9 county municipalities	21 villages		
Canada	Federal	Nova Scotia	11 district municipalities	21 villages		
Canada	Federal	Nova Scotia	25 towns			
Canada	Federal	Nova Scotia	4 regional municipalities			
Canada	Federal	Ontario	173 single-tier municipalities (Note: Note that only 11 single-tier municipalities are located in an independent census division. The remaining 162 single-tier municipalities are known as separated municipalities and are counted as part of the statistical area of a neighbouring regional municipality, county, or district by Statistics Canada despite their separated government structures.)			
Canada	Federal	Ontario	8 regional municipalities	241 lower-tier municipalities 46 local services boards		
Canada	Federal	Ontario	22 counties	241 lower-tier municipalities 46 local services boards		
Canada	Federal	Ontario	10 districts (Note: In Ontario, districts are only used in some instances to streamline services delivered by the provincial government, and for statistical purposes, and have no elected government of their own. Areas of districts that are not part of a single-tier municipality or First Nations indian reserves are either administered directly by the government of Ontario or a local services board.)	241 lower-tier municipalities 46 local services boards		
Canada	Federal	Prince Edward Island	2 cities			
Canada	Federal	Prince Edward Island	10 towns			
Canada	Federal	Prince Edward Island	44 rural municipalities			
Canada	Federal	Prince Edward Island	1 resort municipality			
Canada	Federal	Quebec	87 regional county municipalities (municipalités régionale de comté) (RCM/MRC) 17 territories equivalent to a regional county municipality (territoires équivalents) (TE): 5 TEs coextensive (or nearly coextensive) with an urban agglomeration (agglomérations); 9 cities (cités/villes) independent of any RCM; 3 other equivalent territories: Jamésie; Eeyou Istchee; Kativik	1,108 municipalities (municipalités)	45 boroughs (arrondissements) (Note: Only in 8 municipalities)	
Canada	Federal	Saskatchewan	296 rural municipalities	478 municipalities		
Canada	Federal	Saskatchewan	2 unincorporated areas: Northern Saskatchewan Administration District; Prince Albert National Park	478 municipalities		
Canada	Federal	3 territories:				
Canada	Federal	Northwest Territories	5 regions (Note: In the Northwest Territories, regions are used to streamline services delivered by the territorial government, and have no government of their own.)	24 municipalities		
Canada	Federal	Nunavut	3 regions (Note: In Nunavut, regions are used to streamline services delivered by the territorial government, and have no government of their own.)	25 municipalities		
Canada	Federal	Yukon	(unorganized)	8 municipalities		
Canada	Federal	3,406 Indian reserves				
Cape Verde	Unitary	22 councils or municipalities (concelhos (Note: Also referred to as municípios.))	32 parishes (freguesias)			
Central African Republic	Unitary	7 regions (régions)	20 prefectures (préfectures)	85 sub-prefectures (sous-préfectures)	198 communes	* villages (villages) * neighbourhoods (quartiers)
Chad	Unitary	23 provinces (provinces)	120 departments (départements)	454 sub-prefectures (sous-préfectures)		
Chile	Regional	16 regions (regiones)	56 provinces (provincias)	346 communes (comunas)	neighborhood units (unidades vecinales) (Note: According to article 118 paragraph 7 of the Constitution of Chile, their establishment is a voluntary faculty for the municipalities.)	
China, People's Republic of	Regional	23 provinces (shěng) (Note: Including Taiwan Province, which is claimed by the People's Republic of China, but is de facto administered by the Republic of China (Taiwan).)	280+ prefecture-level cities (dìjíshī) 17 prefectures (dìqū) 30 autonomous prefectures (zìzhìzhōu)	1,400+ counties (xiàn) 110+ autonomous counties (zìzhìxiàn) 850+ county-level districts ((shìxiá)qū) 1 special district (tèqū) 370+ county-level cities (xiànjíshì) 1 forestry district (línqū)	19,500+ towns (zhèn) 14,600+ townships (xiāng) 1,000+ ethnic townships (mínzúxiāng) 6,100+ subdistricts (jiēbàn or jiēdàobànshìchù) 11 district public offices (qūgōngsuǒ) Urban areas: (residential) communities (shèqū) or neighbourhoods (jūmínqū) Rural areas: villages (cūnjí), village areas or village groups (Note: Either zìráncūnjí ("natural" villages) or xíngzhèngcūnjí (bureaucratic villages))	
China, People's Republic of	Regional	5 autonomous regions (zìzhìqū)	280+ prefecture-level cities (dìjíshī) 17 prefectures (dìqū) 30 autonomous prefectures (zìzhìzhōu)	1,400+ counties (xiàn) 110+ autonomous counties (zìzhìxiàn) 850+ county-level districts ((shìxiá)qū) 1 special district (tèqū) 370+ county-level cities (xiànjíshì) 1 forestry district (línqū)	19,500+ towns (zhèn) 14,600+ townships (xiāng) 1,000+ ethnic townships (mínzúxiāng) 6,100+ subdistricts (jiēbàn or jiēdàobànshìchù) 11 district public offices (qūgōngsuǒ) Urban areas: (residential) communities (shèqū) or neighbourhoods (jūmínqū) Rural areas: villages (cūnjí), village areas or village groups	
China, People's Republic of	Regional	4 municipalities (zhíxiáshì)	280+ prefecture-level cities (dìjíshī) 17 prefectures (dìqū) 30 autonomous prefectures (zìzhìzhōu)	1,400+ counties (xiàn) 110+ autonomous counties (zìzhìxiàn) 850+ county-level districts ((shìxiá)qū) 1 special district (tèqū) 370+ county-level cities (xiànjíshì) 1 forestry district (línqū)	19,500+ towns (zhèn) 14,600+ townships (xiāng) 1,000+ ethnic townships (mínzúxiāng) 6,100+ subdistricts (jiēbàn or jiēdàobànshìchù) 11 district public offices (qūgōngsuǒ) Urban areas: (residential) communities (shèqū) or neighbourhoods (jūmínqū) Rural areas: villages (cūnjí), village areas or village groups	
China, People's Republic of	Regional	2 special administrative regions (tèbié xíngzhèngqū):				
China, People's Republic of	Regional	Hong Kong	18 districts			
China, People's Republic of	Regional	Macau	7 parishes (freguesias)			
Colombia	Unitary	32 departments (departamentos)	1,102 municipalities (municipios)	2,000+ corregimientos (towns)	veredas	
Colombia	Unitary	32 departments (departamentos)	1,102 municipalities (municipios)	communes (comunas)	neighbourhoods (barrios)	
Colombia	Unitary	1 Capital District (Distrito Capital):			neighbourhoods (barrios)	
Colombia	Unitary	Bogotá	20 localities (localidades)		neighbourhoods (barrios)	
Comoros	Federal	3 autonomous islands(îles autonomes) (Note: Not including Mayotte, which is claimed by the Comoros, but is administered by France.)	16 prefectures (préfectures)	54 communes	318 villes or villages	
Congo, Democratic Republic of the (Note: Also known as Congo-Kinshasa)	Unitary	25 provinces	145 territories 33 cities	264 chiefdoms 470 sectors 313 communes	6,070 groupings 2,401 quarters	
Congo, Democratic Republic of the	Unitary	1 Capital City:	145 territories 33 cities	264 chiefdoms 470 sectors 313 communes	6,070 groupings 2,401 quarters	
Congo, Democratic Republic of the	Unitary	Kinshasa	145 territories 33 cities	264 chiefdoms 470 sectors 313 communes	6,070 groupings 2,401 quarters	
Congo, Republic of the (Note: Also known as Congo-Brazzaville)	Unitary	15 departments	80+ districts	communes		
Costa Rica	Unitary	7 provinces (provincias)	84 cantons (cantones)	492 districts (distritos) 3 special cities (ciudades especiales)	Urban: asentamiento, caserío, ciudad, localidad Rural: barrio, poblado	
Costa Rica	Unitary	7 provinces (provincias)	24 indigenous territories	492 districts (distritos) 3 special cities (ciudades especiales)	Urban: asentamiento, caserío, ciudad, localidad Rural: barrio, poblado	
Croatia	Unitary	20 counties (županije)	128 towns (gradovi)	4,117+ local communities (mjesnih odbora) (gradske četvrti [Zagreb], gradski kotari [Split])	6,700+ settlements (naselja)	
Croatia	Unitary	20 counties (županije)	428 municipalities (općine)	4,117+ local communities (mjesnih odbora) (gradske četvrti [Zagreb], gradski kotari [Split])	6,700+ settlements (naselja)	
Cuba	Unitary	15 provinces (provincias)	160+ municipalities (municipios)			
Cuba	Unitary	1 special municipality (municipio especial):	160+ municipalities (municipios)			
Cuba	Unitary	Isla de la Juventud	160+ municipalities (municipios)			
Cyprus	Unitary	6 districts (eparchies) (Note: Including 4 districts that are partially or entirely occupied by the Turkish Republic of Northern Cyprus (Northern Cyprus).)	20 municipalities (dímoi)			
Czech Republic	Unitary	13 regions (kraje)	76 districts (okresy)	393 municipalities with commissioned local authority (Note: 2nd level municipalities) (obce s pověřeným obecním úřadem)	6,254 1st level municipalities (obce)	
Czech Republic	Unitary	13 regions (kraje)	205 municipalities with extended competence (Note: 3rd level municipalities) (obce s rozšířenou působností)	393 municipalities with commissioned local authority (obce s pověřeným obecním úřadem)	4 military training areas (vojenské újezdy)	
Czech Republic	Unitary	1 capital city:				
Czech Republic	Unitary	Capital City of Prague (Hlavní město Praha)	10 districts (obvody) (Note: Judicial only)	57 municipal districts (městské části)	112 cadastral communities (katastrální území)	
Czech Republic	Unitary	Capital City of Prague (Hlavní město Praha)	22 administrative districts (správní obvody)	57 municipal districts (městské části)	112 cadastral communities (katastrální území)	
Denmark, Kingdom of	Regional	Denmark	5 regions (regioner)	98 municipalities (kommuner)		
Denmark, Kingdom of	Regional	2 autonomous territories:				
Denmark, Kingdom of	Regional	Faroe Islands	6 regions (Faroese: sýsla; Danish: syssel)	29 municipalities (kommunur)		
Denmark, Kingdom of	Regional	Greenland	5 municipalities (kommuner)			
Denmark, Kingdom of	Regional	Greenland	1 national park (Greenlandic: Kalaallit Nunaanni nuna eqqissisimatitaq; Danish: Nationalpark):			
Denmark, Kingdom of	Regional	Greenland	Northeast Greenland National Park			
Djibouti	Unitary	6 regions (régions)	15 sub-prefectures (Note: Due to be replaced by [communes])			
Djibouti	Unitary	6 regions (régions)	6 arrondissements (Note: Only within Djibouti City)			
Dominica	Unitary	10 parishes	41 local authorities:			
Dominica	Unitary	10 parishes	1 city			
Dominica	Unitary	10 parishes	1 town			
Dominica	Unitary	10 parishes	1 urban district			
Dominica	Unitary	10 parishes	1 territory			
Dominica	Unitary	10 parishes	37 village districts			
Dominican Republic	Unitary	31 provinces (provincias)	158 municipalities (municipios)	40+ municipal districts (distritos municipales)		
Dominican Republic	Unitary	1 National District (Distrito Nacional):	158 municipalities (municipios)	40+ municipal districts (distritos municipales)		
Dominican Republic	Unitary	Distrito Nacional	158 municipalities (municipios)	40+ municipal districts (distritos municipales)		
Ecuador	Unitary	24 provinces (provincias)	221 cantons (cantones)	1,000+ parishes (parroquias)	populated places (lugares poblados): * caseríos * barrios * recintos * comunas * anejos * colonias, etc.	
Egypt	Unitary	27 governorates (muḥāfaẓāt)	351 municipal divisions:			
Egypt	Unitary	27 governorates (muḥāfaẓāt)	177 kism	4,617+ villages or districts (qura or ahya)	residential districts (sheyakha)	
Egypt	Unitary	27 governorates (muḥāfaẓāt)	162 markaz	4,617+ villages or districts (qura or ahya)	residential districts (sheyakha)	
Egypt	Unitary	27 governorates (muḥāfaẓāt)	9 new cities	4,617+ villages or districts (qura or ahya)	residential districts (sheyakha)	
Egypt	Unitary	27 governorates (muḥāfaẓāt)	3 police-administered areas	4,617+ villages or districts (qura or ahya)	residential districts (sheyakha)	
El Salvador	Unitary	14 departments (departamentos)	44 municipalities (municipios)	262 districts (distritos)	* downtown areas/centres (cabeceras) [urban]; * cantons (cantones) [rural]	* neighborhoods (barrios) & colonies (colonias) [urban]; * villages (aldeas) & hamlets (caserios) [rural]
Equatorial Guinea	Unitary	8 provinces (provincias)	32 districts (distritos)			
Eritrea	Unitary	6 regions (zoba)	58 districts	communes (kebabis)	villages and towns	
Estonia (Note: Estonia's linnad (towns) and vallad (parishes) are known collectively as omavalitsused (municipalities).)	Unitary	15 counties (maakonnad)	15 towns (linnad)	districts (linnaosad)	subdistricts (asumid)	
Estonia	Unitary	15 counties (maakonnad)	64 parishes (vallad)	quarters (kandid)	32 towns (linnad)	
Estonia	Unitary	15 counties (maakonnad)	64 parishes (vallad)	quarters (kandid)	12 boroughs (alevid)	
Estonia	Unitary	15 counties (maakonnad)	64 parishes (vallad)	quarters (kandid)	188 small boroughs (alevikud)	
Estonia	Unitary	15 counties (maakonnad)	64 parishes (vallad)	quarters (kandid)	4,455 villages (külad)	
Eswatini	Unitary	4 regions (tifundza)	50+ constituencies (tinkhundla)	360+ chiefdoms (imiphakatsi)		
Ethiopia	Federal	12 regions (kililoch)	68 zones (zonoch)	600+ districts (woreda)	16,000+ wards (kebele)	
Ethiopia	Federal	2 chartered cities (astedader akababiwach)	68 zones (zonoch)	600+ districts (woreda)	16,000+ wards (kebele)	
Fiji	Unitary	4 divisions	14 provinces	+ 50 districts (tikina)	1,000+ villages (koro)	
Fiji	Unitary	1 dependency:				
Fiji	Unitary	Rotuma	7 districts			
Finland	Regional	18 regions (maakuntaa)	70+ subregions (seutukuntaa)	293 municipalities (kuntaa) (Note: Consisting of kaupungit (urban communes) and kunnat (communes))	wards (suuralueet)	* districts (kaupunginosat) [urban] * villages (kylät) [rural]
Finland	Regional	1 autonomous region (itsehallinnollinen maakunta):				
Finland	Regional	Åland	16 municipalities (kommuner (kuntaa))		wards (suuralueet)	* districts (kaupunginosat) [urban] * villages (kylät) [rural]
France	Regional	18 regions (régions) (Note: Including 5 overseas regions (French Guiana, Guadeloupe, Martinique, Mayotte, and Réunion).)	101 departments (départements)	332 arrondissements	2,054 cantons (electoral constituencies)	
France	Regional	18 regions (régions)	101 departments (départements)	332 arrondissements	12,159 intercommunalities	35,357 communes (Note: The 3 communes of Paris, Lyon, and Marseille are further subdivided into municipal arrondissements.)
France	Regional	18 regions (régions)	Metropolis of Lyon	332 arrondissements	12,159 intercommunalities	35,357 communes
France	Regional	5 overseas collectivities (collectivités d'outre-mer):				
France	Regional	French Polynesia (Note: also known as a pays d'outre-mer (overseas country).)	5 administrative subdivisions (subdivisions administratives)	40+ communes		
France	Regional	Saint-Barthélemy	2 parishes	40 quarters		
France	Regional	Saint-Martin				
France	Regional	Saint-Pierre and Miquelon	2 communes			
France	Regional	Wallis and Futuna	3 traditional kingdoms (royaumes coutumiers)	3 districts (Note: Uvea only)		
France	Regional	1 sui generis collectivity (collectivité sui generis):				
France	Regional	New Caledonia	3 provinces	30+ communes		
France	Regional	1 overseas territory (territoire d'outre-mer):				
France	Regional	French Southern and Antarctic Lands (Note: Claim frozen by the Antarctic Treaty.)	5 districts			
France	Regional	1 state private property under the direct authority of the French government:				
France	Regional	Clipperton Island				
Gabon	Unitary	9 provinces	49 departments (départements)	152 cantons		
Gabon	Unitary	9 provinces	49 departments (départements)	52 communes		
Gabon	Unitary	9 provinces	49 departments (départements)	29 arrondissements		
Gambia	Unitary	5 regions	8 Local Government Areas	43 districts	electoral wards	settlements
Gambia	Unitary	1 city	8 Local Government Areas	43 districts	electoral wards	settlements
Georgia	Regional	9 regions (mkhare)	69 municipalities (munitsip’alit’et’ebi): 64 communities (temi) 5 cities (k'alak'i)	1,000s+ administrative units (administ’ratsiuli erteulebi) ? rural communities (sasoplo temebi)	10,000s+ populated places/settlements (dasakhlebuli p’unkt’ebi) ? townlets (kalakebi) ? urban-type settlements (dabebi) ? villages (soplebi)	
Georgia	Regional	2 autonomous republics:	69 municipalities (munitsip’alit’et’ebi): 64 communities (temi) 5 cities (k'alak'i)	1,000s+ administrative units (administ’ratsiuli erteulebi) ? rural communities (sasoplo temebi)	10,000s+ populated places/settlements (dasakhlebuli p’unkt’ebi) ? townlets (kalakebi) ? urban-type settlements (dabebi) ? villages (soplebi)	
Georgia	Regional	Abkhazia	69 municipalities (munitsip’alit’et’ebi): 64 communities (temi) 5 cities (k'alak'i)	1,000s+ administrative units (administ’ratsiuli erteulebi) ? rural communities (sasoplo temebi)	10,000s+ populated places/settlements (dasakhlebuli p’unkt’ebi) ? townlets (kalakebi) ? urban-type settlements (dabebi) ? villages (soplebi)	
Georgia	Regional	Adjara	69 municipalities (munitsip’alit’et’ebi): 64 communities (temi) 5 cities (k'alak'i)	1,000s+ administrative units (administ’ratsiuli erteulebi) ? rural communities (sasoplo temebi)	10,000s+ populated places/settlements (dasakhlebuli p’unkt’ebi) ? townlets (kalakebi) ? urban-type settlements (dabebi) ? villages (soplebi)	
Georgia	Regional	1 area without a constitutionally defined status: (Note: South Ossetia is not currently under Georgia's de facto jurisdiction, and has no final defined constitutional status in Georgia's territorial arrangement.)	69 municipalities (munitsip’alit’et’ebi): 64 communities (temi) 5 cities (k'alak'i)	1,000s+ administrative units (administ’ratsiuli erteulebi) ? rural communities (sasoplo temebi)	10,000s+ populated places/settlements (dasakhlebuli p’unkt’ebi) ? townlets (kalakebi) ? urban-type settlements (dabebi) ? villages (soplebi)	
Georgia	Regional	South Ossetia (Note: South Ossetia's status is disputed. It considers itself to be an independent state, but this is recognised by only a few other countries. The Georgian government and most of the world's other states consider South Ossetia de jure a part of Georgia's territory.)	69 municipalities (munitsip’alit’et’ebi): 64 communities (temi) 5 cities (k'alak'i)	1,000s+ administrative units (administ’ratsiuli erteulebi) ? rural communities (sasoplo temebi)	10,000s+ populated places/settlements (dasakhlebuli p’unkt’ebi) ? townlets (kalakebi) ? urban-type settlements (dabebi) ? villages (soplebi)	
Georgia	Regional	1 city with special status:				
Georgia	Regional	Tbilisi	10 districts (raions)			
Germany	Federal	16 states (Länder): (Note: or, informally, Bundesländer (federal states).)				
Germany	Federal	Baden-Württemberg; Bavaria; Hesse; North Rhine-Westphalia	19 administrative districts (Regierungsbezirke)	3 special regional associations (Kommunalverbände besonderer Art) (Note: Region Hannover, Regionalverband Saarbrücken and Städteregion Aachen) 294 rural districts (Landkreise or Kreise)	1281 municipal associations (Gemeindeverbände) (Note: usually in rural areas and known by various names in different states, e.g. Amt, Samtgemeinde, Verbandsgemeinde and Verwaltungsgemeinschaft) 10907 municipalities (Gemeinden), including 1951 towns (Städte) 386 market towns (Märkte) (only in Bavaria)	
Germany	Federal	Brandenburg; Lower Saxony; Mecklenburg-Vorpommern; Rhineland-Palatinate; Saarland; Saxony; Saxony-Anhalt; Schleswig-Holstein; Thuringia		3 special regional associations (Kommunalverbände besonderer Art) 294 rural districts (Landkreise or Kreise)	1281 municipal associations (Gemeindeverbände) 10907 municipalities (Gemeinden), including 1951 towns (Städte) 386 market towns (Märkte) (only in Bavaria)	
Germany	Federal	Brandenburg; Lower Saxony; Mecklenburg-Vorpommern; Rhineland-Palatinate; Saarland; Saxony; Saxony-Anhalt; Schleswig-Holstein; Thuringia		103 cities (urban districts) (Kreisfreie Städte or Stadtkreise)		
Germany	Federal	Bremen	2 cities (Städte)	7 boroughs (Stadtbezirke)	32 quarters (Stadtteile)	113 neighbourhoods (Ortsteile)
Germany	Federal	Berlin	12 boroughs (Bezirke)	97 neighbourhoods (Ortsteile)		
Germany	Federal	Hamburg	7 boroughs (Bezirke)	104 quarters (Stadtteile)	181 neighbourhoods (Ortsteile)	
Ghana	Unitary	16 regions	216 districts	Communities tema		
Ghana	Unitary	16 regions	8 municipal districts	zones		
Ghana	Unitary	16 regions	3 metropolitan districts	submetropolitan districts		
Greece	Regional	7 decentralized administrations (apokentroménes dioikíseis)	13 administrative regions (peripheries)	74 regional units (perifereiakés enótites)	332 municipalities (dímoi)	
Greece	Regional	1 autonomous monastic state (aftonomi monastiki politeia):				
Greece	Regional	Agio Oros				
Grenada	Unitary	6 parishes				
Grenada	Unitary	1 dependency:				
Grenada	Unitary	Carriacou and Petite Martinique				
Guatemala	Unitary	22 departments (departamentos)	340 municipalities (municipios)	sub-municipal zones (zonas sub-municipales)	populated places (lugares poblados): * villages (aldeas) * settlements (asentamientos) * quarters (colonias) * rural estates/farmsteads/hamlets (fincas) * spots (parajes)	
Guinea	Unitary	8 regions (régions)	33 prefectures (préfectures)	330+ sub-prefectures (sous-préfectures)	4,142 units: * districts * villages	15,741 sub-units: * quarters (quartiers) * sectors (secteurs)
Guinea	Unitary	8 regions (régions)	5 communes	330+ sub-prefectures (sous-préfectures)	4,142 units: * districts * villages	15,741 sub-units: * quarters (quartiers) * sectors (secteurs)
Guinea	Unitary	8 regions (régions)	5 communes	330+ sub-prefectures (sous-préfectures)	? units: * districts * villages	? sub-units: * quarters (quartiers) * sectors (secteurs)
Guinea-Bissau	Unitary	8 regions (regiões)	39 sectors (setores)	sections (secções)	populated places (locais povoados): towns (cidades) villages (aldeias) localities (localidades) settlements (povoações) communities (comunidades)	
Guinea-Bissau	Unitary	1 autonomous sector (sector autónomo):	39 sectors (setores)	sections (secções)	populated places (locais povoados): towns (cidades) villages (aldeias) localities (localidades) settlements (povoações) communities (comunidades)	
Guinea-Bissau	Unitary	Bissau	39 sectors (setores)	sections (secções)	populated places (locais povoados): towns (cidades) villages (aldeias) localities (localidades) settlements (povoações) communities (comunidades)	
Guyana	Unitary	10 regions	64 neighborhood councils			
Haiti	Unitary	10 departments (départements)	42 arrondissements	144 communes	571 communal sections (sections communales)	10,180 villages
Honduras	Unitary	18 departments (departamentos)	298 municipalities (municipios)	3,731 villages (aldeas)		
Hungary	Unitary	19 counties (vármegye)	174 districts (járás)	3,154 municipalities (városok/községek)		
Hungary	Unitary	1 autonomous city:				
Hungary	Unitary	Budapest	23 districts (kerület)			
Hungary	Unitary	Budapest	1 non-district			
Iceland	Unitary	61 municipalities (sveitarfélög)				
India	Federal	28 states (rajya)	103 divisions (mandal)	788 districts/revenue districts (zilā)	sub-divisions/revenue divisions	6057 subdistricts (tahsīl) (Note: Fifth-level administrative division)
India	Federal	28 states (rajya)	103 divisions (mandal)	788 districts/revenue districts (zilā)	sub-divisions/revenue divisions	community development blocks/tribal development blocks (Note: Sixth-level administrative division)
India	Federal	28 states (rajya)	103 divisions (mandal)	788 districts/revenue districts (zilā)	sub-divisions/revenue divisions	revenue villages (Note: Seventh-level administrative division)
India	Federal	28 states (rajya)	103 divisions (mandal)	788 districts/revenue districts (zilā)	255 municipal corporations (nagar nigam)	wards
India	Federal	8 union territories (kendra-shāsit pradesh)	103 divisions (mandal)	788 districts/revenue districts (zilā)	255 municipal corporations (nagar nigam)	wards
India	Federal	8 union territories (kendra-shāsit pradesh)	103 divisions (mandal)	788 districts/revenue districts (zilā)	1,897 municipal councils/municipalities (nagar pālikā)	wards
India	Federal	8 union territories (kendra-shāsit pradesh)	103 divisions (mandal)	788 districts/revenue districts (zilā)	2,437 town councils (nagar pañcāyat)	wards
India	Federal	8 union territories (kendra-shāsit pradesh)	103 divisions (mandal)	788 districts/revenue districts (zilā)	665 district councils (zilā parishad)	6,711 block councils (panchayat samiti) (Note: Fifth-level administrative division)
India	Federal	8 union territories (kendra-shāsit pradesh)	103 divisions (mandal)	788 districts/revenue districts (zilā)	665 district councils (zilā parishad)	255,219 village councils (grām pañcāyat) (Note: Sixth-level administrative division)
Indonesia	Regional	38 provinces (provinsi) (Note: Including 9 special regions (daerah istimewa/khusus))	416 regencies (kabupaten)	7,266 districts (kecamatan/distrik/kapanewon/kemantren)	83,467 villages (kelurahan/desa)	
Indonesia	Regional	38 provinces (provinsi)	98 cities (kota)	7,266 districts (kecamatan/distrik/kapanewon/kemantren)	83,467 villages (kelurahan/desa)	
Iran	Unitary	31 provinces (ostanha)	467 counties (shahrestan)	districts (bakhsh)	rural districts (dehestan)	villages (rosta)
Iran	Unitary	31 provinces (ostanha)	467 counties (shahrestan)	districts (bakhsh)	cities (shahr)	neighbourhoods (mahalleh)
Iraq	Federal	19 governorates (muḥāfaẓāt) (Note: Including 4 governorates in the autonomous Kurdistan Region (counting Halabja).)	120 districts (aqḍyat)	300+ subdistricts (naḥiyat)	villages (qaryat)	
Ireland	Unitary	26 counties (contaetha)	89 municipal districts (ceantair bardasacha) 4 borough districts (ceantair buirge 2 metropolitan districts (ceantair cathracha)	3,440 electoral divisions (toghroinn ceantair)	51,430 townlands (bailte)	
Ireland	Unitary	3 cities (cathracha)	89 municipal districts (ceantair bardasacha) 4 borough districts (ceantair buirge 2 metropolitan districts (ceantair cathracha)	3,440 electoral divisions (toghroinn ceantair)	51,430 townlands (bailte)	
Ireland	Unitary	2 combined cities and counties	89 municipal districts (ceantair bardasacha) 4 borough districts (ceantair buirge 2 metropolitan districts (ceantair cathracha)	3,440 electoral divisions (toghroinn ceantair)	18,641 small areas (ceantair beaga)	
Israel	Regional	6 districts (meḥozot)	15 sub-districts (nafot)	52 natural regions	255 local authority units (reshut mekomiot) 77 cities (arim); 124 local councils (moaṣot mekomiot); 54 regional councils (moaṣot azoriot)	populated places (mekomot me'uchlasim) on urban local authorities: * internal municipal divisions (chalukot pnimiyot) * municipal districts (mechozot) * neighborhoods (shkhunot) on rural local authorities: * community settlements (yishuvim kahilti'im) * institutional localities (yishuvim musdi'im) * farm clusters (kibbutzum) * farm settlements (moshavim) * collective farm villages (moshavim shitufiim) * rural localities (yishuvim kifri'im)
Israel	Regional	Judea and Samaria Area (Note: Israeli designation for the West Bank. The West Bank (including East Jerusalem) and Gaza Strip are considered occupied Palestinian territories by the United Nations, the United States, the International Court of Justice, and the European Union.)	15 sub-districts (nafot)	52 natural regions	255 local authority units (reshut mekomiot) 77 cities (arim); 124 local councils (moaṣot mekomiot); 54 regional councils (moaṣot azoriot)	populated places (mekomot me'uchlasim) on urban local authorities: * internal municipal divisions (chalukot pnimiyot) * municipal districts (mechozot) * neighborhoods (shkhunot) on rural local authorities: * community settlements (yishuvim kahilti'im) * institutional localities (yishuvim musdi'im) * farm clusters (kibbutzum) * farm settlements (moshavim) * collective farm villages (moshavim shitufiim) * rural localities (yishuvim kifri'im)
Italy	Regional	20 regions (regioni):				
Italy	Regional	15 ordinary regions (regioni ordinarie):				
Italy	Regional	Abruzzo; Apulia; Basilicata; Calabria; Campania; Emilia-Romagna; Lazio; Liguria; Lombardy; Marche; Molise; Piedmont; Tuscany; Umbria; Veneto	82 provinces (province) 2 autonomous provinces (province autonome) 4 regional decentralization entities (enti di decentramento regionale) 6 free municipal consortia (liberi consorzi comunali) 15 metropolitan cities (città metropolitane)	7,896 communes (comuni)	60,101 fractions (frazioni) and circumscriptions (circoscrizioni)	
Italy	Regional	5 autonomous regions (regioni autonome):	82 provinces (province) 2 autonomous provinces (province autonome) 4 regional decentralization entities (enti di decentramento regionale) 6 free municipal consortia (liberi consorzi comunali) 15 metropolitan cities (città metropolitane)	7,896 communes (comuni)	60,101 fractions (frazioni) and circumscriptions (circoscrizioni)	
Italy	Regional	Friuli-Venezia Giulia; Sardinia; Sicily; Trentino-South Tyrol	82 provinces (province) 2 autonomous provinces (province autonome) 4 regional decentralization entities (enti di decentramento regionale) 6 free municipal consortia (liberi consorzi comunali) 15 metropolitan cities (città metropolitane)	7,896 communes (comuni)	60,101 fractions (frazioni) and circumscriptions (circoscrizioni)	
Italy	Regional	Aosta Valley		7,896 communes (comuni)	60,101 fractions (frazioni) and circumscriptions (circoscrizioni)	
Ivory Coast	Regional	14 districts (districts autonomes)	31 regions (régions)	111 departments (départements)	510 sub-prefectures (sous-préfectures)	8,000+ villages (localités)
Ivory Coast	Regional	14 districts (districts autonomes)	31 regions (régions)	1 unincorporated area	510 sub-prefectures (sous-préfectures)	8,000+ villages (localités)
Jamaica	Unitary	14 parishes				
Japan	Regional	47 prefectures (ken) (Note: Including: 1 metropolis (to) (Tokyo); 1 regional prefecture (dō) (Hokkaido); 2 urban prefectures (fu) (Kyoto and Osaka))	792 Cities (shi) 307 districts (gun) 18 subprefectures (shichō) 23 special wards (tokubetsu-ku)	1,719 municipalities (shichōsonku)	ōaza aza chō chōme	
Jordan	Unitary	12 governorates (muḥāfaẓāt)	52 Districts (Alwia'a)	89 Subdistricts (Nahiya)	qurah	
Kazakhstan	Regional	17 regions (oblys); 3 cities with region rights (qala); Baikonur (Note: The city has a special status because it is currently being leased to Russia with Baikonur Cosmodrome until the year 2050)	319 raions (audan) oblystyq qala	kent	auyl aimaq	
Kenya	Regional	47 counties (kaunti)	262 sub-counties (kaunti ndogo)	2,400+ locations (mtaa)	Cities, Municipalities and Towns villages (vijiji)	
Kiribati	Unitary	24 unitary councils				
Kuwait	Unitary	6 governorates (muḥāfaẓāt)	132 areas (manāṭiq)			
Kyrgyzstan	Unitary	7 regions (oblus); 2 independent cities (shaar (kengesh))	44 districts (rayon); 14 towns (gorkengesh)	rural communities or rural districts (aiyl aimagy)		
Laos	Unitary	17 provinces (khoueng); 1 prefecture	140+ districts (muang or muong)	villages (baan)		
Latvia	Unitary	35 municipalities (novadi); 7 republic cities (Republikas pilsētas)	71 cities/towns (pilsētas); 512 parishes (pagasti)			
Lebanon	Unitary	9 governorates (muḥāfaẓāt)	26 districts (qaḍya)	1,030 municipalities		
Lesotho	Unitary	10 districts	80+ constituencies	120+ community councils		
Liberia	Unitary	15 counties	60+ districts			
Libya	Unitary	22 districts (sha'biyat)	99 baladiyat			
Liechtenstein	Unitary	11 municipalities (Gemeinden)				
Lithuania	Unitary	10 counties (apskritys)	60 municipalities (savivaldybės)	500+ elderships (seniūnijos)	sub-eldership (seniūnaitija)	
Luxembourg	Unitary	12 cantons (Note: French; alternatively German:Kantone.)	100 communes (Note: French; alternatively German:Gemeinden.)	24 quarters (Note: Luxembourgish: quartierën; alternatively French:quartiers, German:Stadtvierteln.)		
Madagascar	Unitary	24 regions (faritra)	114 districts (distrika)	1,579 communes (kaominina); 17,485 villages (fokontany)		
Malawi	Unitary	3 regions	28 districts	130+ traditional authorities	60+ subchiefdoms	
Malaysia	Federal	13 states (negeri); 3 federal territories (wilayah persekutuan)	155 local government areas			
Maldives	Unitary	17 atolls 4 cities	189 islands			
Mali	Unitary	19 regions (régions); 1 capital district	40+ cercles (circles)	1,400+ arrondissements	700+ communes	
Malta	Unitary	5 regions (reġjuni)	68 local councils (kunsilli lokali)			
Marshall Islands	Unitary	24 municipalities				
Mauritania	Regional	15 regions (wilayat); capital city of Nouakchott spans 3 regions	44 departments or moughataas	216 communes (some of which are consolidated with departments)		
Mauritius	Unitary	Rodrigues	14 zones	120+ villages, 4 Towns; 173 localities		
Mauritius	Unitary	Mauritius	9 districts	120+ villages, 4 Towns; 173 localities		
Mauritius	Unitary	2 outer islands with no government (+2 claimed)		120+ villages, 4 Towns; 173 localities		
Mexico	Federal	31 states (estados)	2,458 municipalities (municipios)	A few municipalities are further divided into boroughs, some incompletely.		
Mexico	Federal	1 autonomous city, Mexico City (Ciudad de México)	16 boroughs (demarcaciones territoriales)			
Federated States of Micronesia	Federal	4 states	70+ municipalities			
Moldova	Regional	32 districts or raions (Romanian: raioane) 3 municipalities (municipii): Chișinău, Bălți, and Tighina; 2 autonomous territorial units: Gagauzia and Left Bank of the Dniester (claimed but administered as the unrecognized independent country of Transnistria)	10 municipalities (municipii) 50 cities 60+ city localities 660+ villages (Romanian: sate); 880+ village localities			
Monaco	Unitary	1 municipality	5 quarters	10 wards		
Mongolia	Unitary	21 provinces (aimags)	331 districts (sum)	1,538 bags		
Mongolia	Unitary	1 capital city, Ulaanbaatar	9 districts (düüregs)	173 subdistricts (khoroos)		
Montenegro	Unitary	25 municipalities (opštine)	1,256 naselja			
Morocco	Unitary	12 regions (3 containing parts of occupied Western Sahara)	13 prefectures 62 provinces	circles	rural communes	
Morocco	Unitary	12 regions (3 containing parts of occupied Western Sahara)	13 prefectures 62 provinces		communes urbaines arrondissements	
Mozambique	Unitary	11 provinces (provincias)	128 districts (distritos)	405 administrative posts (postos)	[urban districts] localities (localidades)	
Myanmar	Unitary	7 States	67 Districts	330 Townships	3,183 Wards; 13,602 Village tracts	70,838 Villages
Myanmar	Unitary	7 Regions	67 Districts	330 Townships	3,183 Wards; 13,602 Village tracts	70,838 Villages
Myanmar	Unitary	1 Union Territory	67 Districts	330 Townships	3,183 Wards; 13,602 Village tracts	70,838 Villages
Myanmar	Unitary	5 Self-Administered Zones		330 Townships	3,183 Wards; 13,602 Village tracts	70,838 Villages
Myanmar	Unitary	1 Self-Administered Division		330 Townships	3,183 Wards; 13,602 Village tracts	70,838 Villages
Namibia	Unitary	14 regions	121 constituencies	cities towns villages settlements		
Nauru	Unitary	14 districts				
Nepal	Federal	7 provinces (Pradesh)	77 districts (jilla)	6 metropolitan cities (mahānagarpālikā); 11 sub-metropolitan cities (upa-mahānagarpālikā); 276 municipalities (nagarpālikā) 486 rural municipalities (gāunpālikā)	6,743 wards (wadā)	
Netherlands, Kingdom of the	Regional	4 constituent countries (landen):				
Netherlands, Kingdom of the	Regional	Netherlands	12 provinces (provincies)	342 municipalities (gemeenten)	urban districts (deelgemeenten)	
Netherlands, Kingdom of the	Regional	Netherlands	3 public bodies (openbare lichamen) (Caribbean Netherlands region)	Bonaire	2 towns, neighbourhoods	
Netherlands, Kingdom of the	Regional	Netherlands	3 public bodies (openbare lichamen) (Caribbean Netherlands region)	Sint Eustatius	neighbourhoods	
Netherlands, Kingdom of the	Regional	Netherlands	3 public bodies (openbare lichamen) (Caribbean Netherlands region)	Saba	4 villages	
Netherlands, Kingdom of the	Regional	Aruba	8 regions			
Netherlands, Kingdom of the	Regional	Curaçao	2 districts and 1 special city	10 areas	4 town quarters	
Netherlands, Kingdom of the	Regional	Sint Maarten	8 administrative units			
New Zealand	Regional	Realm of New Zealand:				
New Zealand	Regional	New Zealand	11 non-unitary regions	13 cities 53 districts	110 community boards 21 Auckland local boards	
New Zealand	Regional	New Zealand	5 unitary authorities		110 community boards 21 Auckland local boards	
New Zealand	Regional	New Zealand	1 special territorial authority: Chatham Islands			
New Zealand	Regional	New Zealand	3 outlying islands: Kermadec Islands; Subantarctic Islands; Three Kings Islands			
New Zealand	Regional	Ross Dependency (Note: Claim frozen by the Antarctic Treaty.)				
New Zealand	Regional	1 self-administering territory:				
New Zealand	Regional	Tokelau	3 island councils			
New Zealand	Regional	2 states in free-association:				
New Zealand	Regional	Cook Islands	10 island councils	districts	tapere	
New Zealand	Regional	Niue	14 villages			
Nicaragua	Regional	15 departments (departamentos); 2 autonomous regions (regiones autónomas)	153 municipalities (municipios)	populated places (lugares poblados) *barrios *comarcas *sectores *caserios *comunidades		
Niger	Unitary	7 regions (régions); Capital district, Niamey Urban Community	63 départements	265 communes, 122 cantons, and 81 groupements		
Nigeria	Federal	36 states 1 Federal Capital Territory	774 Local Government Areas	8,813 Wards or Districts		
North Korea	Unitary	9 provinces (do); 4 special cities	150+ cities, counties, workers' districts (in some counties), districts, and wards	towns (in counties), neighborhoods (in cities), villages (rural)		
North Macedonia	Unitary	80 municipalities (opštini)				
Norway	Regional	14 counties (fylker), which also have status as first-level municipalities (fylkeskommuner)	354 second-level municipalities (kommuner); 3 hundreds (herader)			
Norway	Regional	1 combined municipality and county:				
Norway	Regional	Oslo	15 boroughs (bydeler)			
Norway	Regional	Oslo	2 non-boroughs (Note: Marka and Sentrum)			
Norway	Regional	2 integral overseas areas:				
Norway	Regional	Jan Mayen				
Norway	Regional	Svalbard				
Norway	Regional	3 dependencies:				
Norway	Regional	Bouvet Island				
Norway	Regional	Peter I Island (Note: Claim frozen by the Antarctic Treaty.)				
Norway	Regional	Queen Maud Land (Note: Claim frozen by the Antarctic Treaty.)				
Oman	Unitary	11 governorates (muḥāfaẓāt)	61 provinces (wilayat)			
Pakistan	Federal	4 provinces 2 autonomous territories	38 divisions	168 districts	596 Tehsils	Almost 6,000 Union Councils
Pakistan	Federal	1 federal capital territory	5 zones	27 union councils		
Palau	Unitary	16 states	town council(s) village hall(s) traditional villages			
Palestine	Unitary	16 governorates	121 municipal councils 355 village councils	local councils (East Jerusalem)		
Panama	Unitary	10 provinces (provincias)	68 districts (distritos)	587 corregimientos (corregimientos) 2 corregimiento-level indigenous regions (comarcas indígenas)	populated places (lugares poblados)	
Panama	Unitary	4 indigenous regions (comarcas indígenas)	11 districts	79 corregimientos	populated places (lugares poblados)	
Papua New Guinea	Regional	20 provinces 1 autonomous region 1 National Capital District	districts	Local-Level Government areas		
Paraguay	Unitary	17 departments (departamentos); Asunción, the capital district (distrito capital)	262 districts (distritos)			
Peru	Regional	26 regional level circumscriptions (gobiernos regionales): 24 departments (departamentos)(constitutional); Regional Government of Callao; Metropolitan Municipality of Lima	196 provinces (provincias)	1,869 districts (distritos)	94,922 populated centers (centros poblados) (Note: 2,959 of them have populated center municipality status, formally recognized by the State.)	
Philippines	Regional	16 administrative regions (rehiyong pampangasiwaan) Bangsamoro, an autonomous region (awtonomong rehiyon)	82 provinces (lalawigan or probinsya)	107 component cities (bahaging lungsod); 1,488 municipalities (bayan or munisipalidad)	42,027 barangays (formerly barrios), some grouped into districts	
Philippines	Regional	16 administrative regions (rehiyong pampangasiwaan) Bangsamoro, an autonomous region (awtonomong rehiyon)	22 independent cities (17 Highly Urbanized Cities and 5 Independent Component Cities)		42,027 barangays (formerly barrios), some grouped into districts	
Philippines	Regional	Metro Manila, the National Capital Region (pambansang punong rehiyon)	16 Highly Urbanized Cities Pateros, an independent municipality		42,027 barangays (formerly barrios), some grouped into districts	
Poland	Unitary	16 voivodeships (województwo)	314 land counties (powiat ziemski)	2,478 municipalities (gminy of 3 types)	40,740 sołectwa (rural) dzielnice or osiedla (urban)	
Poland	Unitary	16 voivodeships (województwo)	66 city counties (powiat grodzki)		40,740 sołectwa (rural) dzielnice or osiedla (urban)	
Portugal	Regional	2 autonomous regions (regiões autónomas); 21 intermunicipal communities (comunidades intermunicipais); 2 metropolitan areas (áreas metropolitanas) 18 districts (distritos)	308 municipalities (concelhos or municípios)	3,259 parishes (freguesias)	localities (localidades)	
Qatar	Unitary	8 municipalities (baladiya'at)	98 Zones			
Romania	Unitary	41 counties (județe)	320 cities and towns (orașe (including 103 major cities, municipii); 2,856 communes (divided into 12,955 villages, sate)			
Romania	Unitary	1 autonomous municipality	6 sectors			
Russia	Federal	89 federal subjects: (Note: Federal subjects, grouped into 7 federal districts) (Note: Including the Republic of Crimea, Sevastopol, the Donetsk People's Republic, Kherson Oblast, the Lugansk People's Republic and Zaporozhye Oblast, which were illegally annexed by Russia in 2014 and 2022 but internationally recognized as part of Ukraine)				
Russia	Federal	48 oblasts (Note: Including Kherson and Zaporizhzhia oblasts which are internationally recognized as part of Ukraine); 24 republics (Note: Including the Republic of Crimea (annexed by Russia in 2014) and the Donetsk and Lugansk People's Republics (annexed in 2022) which are internationally recognized as part of Ukraine); 4 autonomous okrugs 9 krais (territories); 1 autonomous oblast	2,027 districts 561 cities and towns of federal subject significance	416 Towns of district significance 767 urban-type settlements of district significance 15,002 selsoviets and equivalents		
Russia	Federal	3 federal cities (Note: Including Sevastopol which was illegally annexed in 2014 but internationally recognized as part of Ukraine)				
Russia	Federal	Moscow	12 administrative okrugs	125 districts (raions)		
Russia	Federal	St. Petersburg	18 districts (raions)	81 okrugs		
Russia	Federal	Sevastopol (Note: Illegally annexed in 2014 but internationally recognized as part of Ukraine)	4 districts (raions)	9 municipal okrugs and the Town of Inkerman		
Rwanda	Unitary	4 provinces (intara); 1 city (umujyi)	30 districts (uturere, singular akarere)	410+ sectors (imirenge)	2,148 cells (utugari, singular akagali)	14,000+ villages (imidugudu, singular umudugudu)
Saint Kitts and Nevis	Federal	2 islands:				
Saint Kitts and Nevis	Federal	Saint Kitts	14 parishes			
Saint Kitts and Nevis	Federal	Nevis	14 parishes			
Saint Lucia	Unitary	10 districts (formerly 12 quarters)				
Saint Vincent and the Grenadines	Unitary	6 parishes				
Samoa	Unitary	11 districts (itūmālō)	43 subdistricts			
San Marino	Unitary	9 castelli ("castles")	42 curazie			
São Tomé and Príncipe	Regional	6 districts Autonomous Region of Príncipe				
Saudi Arabia	Unitary	13 provinces (manaṭiq)	150 governorates (muḥafaẓat)	1528 centers (marakiz)		
Senegal	Unitary	14 regions	46 departments	133 arrondissements	communes	
Serbia	Regional	29 districts (okruga); 1 autonomous city 1 autonomous province (+1 claimed) (Note: Administered by the partially recognized Republic of Kosovo)	150 municipalities (opština); 24 cities (grada)	4,500+ settlements (naselja)		
Seychelles	Unitary	26 districts				
Sierra Leone	Unitary	4 provinces 1 area	16 districts	190 chiefdoms	1,300+ sections	populated places: * towns * villages
Singapore	Unitary	None				
Slovakia	Unitary	8 regions (kraje)	79 districts (okresy)	2,891 municipalities (obcí) of which 141 are cities or towns (mestá)	cadastraal areas (katastrálne územia)	
Slovenia	Unitary	212 municipalities (občine)				
Solomon Islands	Regional	9 provinces & Honiara, the capital territory	constituencies	wards	enumeration areas	villages
Somalia	Federal	6 states	18 regions (gobolada)	75 districts	settlements	
South Africa	Regional	9 provinces	44 district municipalities	205 local municipalities	4,468 wards	
South Africa	Regional	9 provinces	8 metropolitan municipalities		4,468 wards	
South Korea	Unitary	1 Special City (teukbyeolsi)	Autonomous districts ( jachigu); 5 counties		Neighborhoods (dong) Towns (eup); Townships (myeon)	Rural villages (ri, fifth level) Urban villages (tong, fifth level) Hamlets (ban, sixth level)
South Korea	Unitary	6 Metropolitan Cities (gwangyeoksi)	Autonomous districts ( jachigu); 5 counties		Neighborhoods (dong) Towns (eup); Townships (myeon)	Rural villages (ri, fifth level) Urban villages (tong, fifth level) Hamlets (ban, sixth level)
South Korea	Unitary	6 Metropolitan Cities (gwangyeoksi)	75 cities (si); 77 counties (gun)		Neighborhoods (dong) Towns (eup); Townships (myeon)	Rural villages (ri, fifth level) Urban villages (tong, fifth level) Hamlets (ban, sixth level)
South Korea	Unitary	6 provinces (do)	75 cities (si); 77 counties (gun)	Districts(non-administrative) (ilbangu, haengjeonggu)	Neighborhoods (dong) Towns (eup); Townships (myeon)	Rural villages (ri, fifth level) Urban villages (tong, fifth level) Hamlets (ban, sixth level)
South Korea	Unitary	2 Special Self-Governing Provinces(multi-leveled) (teukbyeol jachido(dacheungje))	75 cities (si); 77 counties (gun)	Districts(non-administrative) (ilbangu, haengjeonggu)	Neighborhoods (dong) Towns (eup); Townships (myeon)	Rural villages (ri, fifth level) Urban villages (tong, fifth level) Hamlets (ban, sixth level)
South Korea	Unitary	1 Special Self-Governing Province(single-leveled) (teukbyeol jachido(dancheungje))		2cities(non-administrative) (haengjeongsi)	Neighborhoods (dong) Towns (eup); Townships (myeon)	Rural villages (ri, fifth level) Urban villages (tong, fifth level) Hamlets (ban, sixth level)
South Korea	Unitary	1 Special Self-Governing City (teukbyeol jachisi)			Neighborhoods (dong) Towns (eup); Townships (myeon)	Rural villages (ri, fifth level) Urban villages (tong, fifth level) Hamlets (ban, sixth level)
South Sudan	Federal	10 States; 2 Administrative Areas; 1 Area with Special Administrative Status	183 counties	540 Payams	2,500 Bomas	
Spain	Regional	17 autonomous communities (comunidades autónomas)	50 provinces (provincias)	477 comarcas	8,129 municipalities (municipios)	
Spain	Regional	2 autonomous municipalities, Ceuta and Melilla, North African coast				
Spain	Regional	3 places of sovereignty (plazas de soberanía)				
Sri Lanka	Regional	9 provinces	25 districts	331 divisions	14,020 Grama Niladhari	
Sudan	Federal	18 states (wilayat)	86 districts			
Suriname	Unitary	10 districts (districten)	62 resorts (ressorten)			
Sweden	Unitary	21 counties (län)	290 municipalities (kommuner)	2,523 registration districts		
Switzerland	Federal	26 cantons (Note: (French; alternatively German:Kantone, Italian:cantoni or Romansh:chantuns). Six cantons, formerly called demi-cantons (French; alternatively German:Halbkantone or Romansh:mez-chantuns), have only one representative in the Council of States instead of two.)	137 districts (not in all cantons, names vary)	2,131 municipalities or communes (varies by canton)		
Syria	Unitary	14 governorates (muḥāfaẓāt)	60 districts (mintaqah)	subdistricts (nawaḥi)	villages	
Tajikistan	Regional	3 regions (viloyatho); Gorno-Badakhshan Autonomous Province; Dushanbe, capital city	60+ districts (nohiya, formerly raion); 18 cities 2 city councils (hukumati)	368 village communes (jamoats)	65 towns 4223 villages	
Tanzania	Regional	31 regions (mikoa), including Zanzibar, a semi-autonomous region spanning five regions	120+ districts (wilayat)	divisions	[wards]	[villages]
Thailand	Unitary	76 provinces (changwat)	878 districts (amphoe)	7,255 subdistricts (tambons)	74,944 villages (muban) Community associations (chum-chon)	
Thailand	Unitary	76 provinces (changwat)	Municipalities (thesaban) of 3 types take some responsibilities of districts and subdistricts (Note: 30 city-municipalities (thesaban nakhon); 178 town-municipalities (thesaban mueang); 2,232 subdistrict-municipalities (thesaban tambon)) Pattaya special administrative area		74,944 villages (muban) Community associations (chum-chon)	
Thailand	Unitary	Bangkok special administrative area	50 districts (khet)	180 subdistricts (kwaeng)		
Timor-Leste (Note: Also known as East Timor.)	Unitary	13 municipalities (municípios, munisípiu)	65 administrative posts (postos administrativos)	442 villages (sucos)	2,336 communities (aldeias)	
Timor-Leste	Unitary	1 special administrative region (região administrativa especial):	65 administrative posts (postos administrativos)	442 villages (sucos)	2,336 communities (aldeias)	
Timor-Leste	Unitary	Oecusse	65 administrative posts (postos administrativos)	442 villages (sucos)	2,336 communities (aldeias)	
Togo	Unitary	5 regions (régions)	30 prefectures (préfectures)			
Tonga	Unitary	5 administrative divisions	23 districts			
Trinidad and Tobago	Regional	7 regions 5 boroughs 2 cities 1 ward (Tobago)				
Tunisia	Unitary	24 governorates (Wilayah)	264 delegations (Mutamadiyat)	350 municipalities (Baladiyah)	2073 sectors (Imadats)	
Turkey	Unitary	81 provinces (il)	403 districts (ilçe)	403 district capitals 388 towns (belde); 18,260 villages (köy)	32,244 neighborhoods (mahalle) (not in villages)	
Turkey	Unitary	30 metropolitan municipalities (consolidated province-municipalities)	519 consolidated district-municipalities		32,244 neighborhoods (mahalle) (not in villages)	
Turkmenistan	Unitary	5 regions (welaýatlar) (also known as provinces)	* 37 districts (etraplar) * 7 cities with district status (etrap hukukly)	* 469 rural councils (or rural municipal units) (geňeşlikler, singular geňeşlik); *68 towns (şäherçeler)	* 1,690 villages (or rural settlements) (oba ilatly ýerler)	
Turkmenistan	Unitary	Ashgabat, the capital city-region	4 boroughs or districts (uly etraplar) (as of 2018)			
Tuvalu	Unitary	9 districts				
Uganda	Unitary	4 regions	15 sub-regions 135 districts 1 city	167 counties 31 municipalities 25 city divisions	1,496 subcounties 580 town councils 89 municipal divisions/boroughs	10,717 parishes 71,213 villages
Ukraine	Regional	24 oblasts (regions) (Note: Currently, one oblast (Luhansk) is fully under Russian control, and three more (Donetsk, Kherson, and Zaporizhzhia) are partially under Russian control.); 2 cities with special status (Note: One city (Sevastopol) is currently under Russian control.); 1 autonomous republic (Note: Currenltly under Russian control)	136 raions (districts)	1469 hromadas (communities)	7567 starosta okruhs (elderships)	
United Arab Emirates	Federal	7 emirates (imarat):				
United Arab Emirates	Federal	Abu Dhabi	3 regions	districts	neighborhoods	
United Arab Emirates	Federal	Ajman	8 sectors	76 neighborhoods		
United Arab Emirates	Federal	Dubai	9 sectors	226 communities		
United Arab Emirates	Federal	Fujairah	6 cities/areas (zones)	neighborhoods		
United Arab Emirates	Federal	Ras Al Khaimah	5 administrative areas	99 neighborhoods		
United Arab Emirates	Federal	Sharjah	9 municipalities	106 districts	neighborhoods	
United Arab Emirates	Federal	Umm Al Quwain	8 sectors	92 zones		
United Kingdom	Regional	4 constituent countries:				
United Kingdom	Regional	1 constituent country without devolution:				
United Kingdom	Regional	England	Greater London	City of London	25 wards	
United Kingdom	Regional	England	Greater London	32 London boroughs (including 1 city)	areas	
United Kingdom	Regional	England	Greater London	32 London boroughs (including 1 city)	10,449 parishes with some unparished areas	
United Kingdom	Regional	England	6 metropolitan counties (covered by combined authorities)	36 metropolitan boroughs (a.k.a. metropolitan districts)	10,449 parishes with some unparished areas	
United Kingdom	Regional	England	21 two-tier non-metropolitan counties	164 non-metropolitan districts	10,449 parishes with some unparished areas	
United Kingdom	Regional	England	Berkshire (non-governing, non-metropolitan)	6 non-metropolitan districts (de facto unitary authorities)	10,449 parishes with some unparished areas	
United Kingdom	Regional	England	56 unitary authorities Isles of Scilly (sui generis)		10,449 parishes with some unparished areas	
United Kingdom	Regional	3 constituent countries with devolution:				
United Kingdom	Regional	Northern Ireland	11 districts			
United Kingdom	Regional	Scotland	32 council areas (comhairlean)	1,369 communities		
United Kingdom	Regional	Wales	22 principal areas (prif ardaloedd)	878 communities (cymunedau)		
United Kingdom	Regional	3 crown dependencies:				
United Kingdom	Regional	Bailiwick of Guernsey	3 jurisdictions:			
United Kingdom	Regional	Bailiwick of Guernsey	Alderney	(contiguous with non-administrative parish of St Anne)		
United Kingdom	Regional	Bailiwick of Guernsey	Guernsey	10 parishes	Parish of Saint Peter Port is divided into four cantons, excluding Herm and Jethou	
United Kingdom	Regional	Bailiwick of Guernsey	Sark	(contiguous with non-administrative parish of St Peter)		
United Kingdom	Regional	Isle of Man	6 sheadings	15 parishes, 9 towns and villages		
United Kingdom	Regional	Jersey	12 parishes	48 vingtaines		
United Kingdom	Regional	Jersey	12 parishes	6 cueillettes		
United Kingdom	Regional	14 British Overseas Territories:				
United Kingdom	Regional	Akrotiri and Dhekelia				
United Kingdom	Regional	Anguilla	14 districts			
United Kingdom	Regional	Bermuda	9 parishes 2 municipalities			
United Kingdom	Regional	British Antarctic Territory (Note: Claim frozen by the Antarctic Treaty.)				
United Kingdom	Regional	British Indian Ocean Territory	2 island groups			
United Kingdom	Regional	British Virgin Islands	5 districts			
United Kingdom	Regional	Cayman Islands	7 districts			
United Kingdom	Regional	Falkland Islands	2 constituencies			
United Kingdom	Regional	Gibraltar	7 major residential areas	70 enumeration areas		
United Kingdom	Regional	Montserrat	3 parishes			
United Kingdom	Regional	Pitcairn Islands	4 islands			
United Kingdom	Regional	Saint Helena, Ascension and Tristan da Cunha	3 constituent parts:			
United Kingdom	Regional	Saint Helena, Ascension and Tristan da Cunha	Ascension Island			
United Kingdom	Regional	Saint Helena, Ascension and Tristan da Cunha	Saint Helena	8 districts		
United Kingdom	Regional	Saint Helena, Ascension and Tristan da Cunha	Tristan da Cunha			
United Kingdom	Regional	South Georgia and the South Sandwich Islands	2 island groups			
United Kingdom	Regional	Turks and Caicos Islands	6 districts			
United States	Federal	50 states:				
United States	Federal	Alabama; Arizona; Arkansas; California; Colorado; Delaware; Florida; Georgia; Hawaii; Idaho; Illinois; Indiana; Iowa; Kansas; Kentucky; Maine; Maryland; Massachusetts; Michigan; Minnesota; Mississippi; Missouri; Montana; Nebraska; Nevada; New Hampshire; New Jersey; New Mexico; New York; North Carolina; North Dakota; Ohio; Oklahoma; Oregon; Pennsylvania; Rhode Island; South Carolina; South Dakota; Tennessee; Texas; Utah; Vermont; Virginia; Washington; West Virginia; Wisconsin; Wyoming	3,040 counties (including 41 independent cities) (Note: Not all have active governments. No county-level government exists in: 8 of 14 counties of Massachusetts; Any counties of Rhode Island; Oglala Lakota and Todd Counties in South Dakota, which are administered by neighboring counties.)	Local government in the United States varies widely by state; some entities cross county and other boundaries. The US Census in 2012 counted 19,522 municipalities, 16,364 townships, 37,203 special districts, and 12,884 independent school districts which have active governments. Many states use township as a governmental level between county and municipality. Most states have counties with unincorporated areas (no municipal government). Municipal governments are called cities, towns, villages, boroughs, and townships, and can form 1-3 layers of government. Many municipalities are administratively divided into boroughs, wards, districts, neighborhoods, or villages, which may or may not have an active government. One of the municipalities in the country is even divided into 5 counties, as the 5 boroughs of New York City also are counties. The US Census defines minor civil divisions and census county divisions for top-level county divisions, many only for statistical purposes.		
United States	Federal	Alaska	19 boroughs			
United States	Federal	Alaska	Unorganized Borough			
United States	Federal	Connecticut	9 councils of governments			
United States	Federal	Louisiana	64 parishes			
United States	Federal	1 federal district:				
United States	Federal	Washington, D.C.				
United States	Federal	326 Indian reservations				
United States	Federal	4 unincorporated organized territories:				
United States	Federal	Guam	19 villages (Note: also known as municipalities.)			
United States	Federal	Northern Mariana Islands	4 municipalities			
United States	Federal	Puerto Rico	78 municipalities	902 barrios		
United States	Federal	United States Virgin Islands	3 districts	20 subdistricts		
United States	Federal	1 unincorporated unorganized self-governing territory:				
United States	Federal	American Samoa	3 districts	15 counties	76 villages	
United States	Federal	American Samoa	2 unorganized atolls			
United States	Federal	United States Minor Outlying Islands:				
United States	Federal	Baker Island; Howland Island; Jarvis Island; Johnston Atoll; Kingman Reef; Midway Islands; Palmyra Atoll (Note: Incorporated); Wake Island; Bajo Nuevo Bank (Note: Disputed); Navassa Island (Note: Disputed); Serranilla Bank (Note: Disputed)				
Uruguay	Unitary	19 departments (departamentos)	125 municipalities (municipios)			
Uzbekistan	Regional	12 regions (viloyatlar)	144 districts (tumanlar)	Citizen assembly of villages Urban-type settlements Cities of district subordination		
Uzbekistan	Regional	12 regions (viloyatlar)	Cities of regional subordination	Cities Citizen assembly of villages Urban-type settlement		
Uzbekistan	Regional	Karakalpakstan, an autonomous republic	Cities of republican subordination	Urban-type settlements		
Uzbekistan	Regional	Karakalpakstan, an autonomous republic	16 districts	Village citizen assemblies Urban-type settlements Cities of district subordination		
Uzbekistan	Regional	Tashkent, an independent city	15 districts	Urban-type settlements		
Vanuatu	Unitary	6 provinces	municipalities, local councils			
Vatican City	Unitary	None				
Venezuela	Federal	23 states (estados)	335 municipalities (municipios)	1,136 parishes (parroquias)	populated centers (centros poblados)	
Venezuela	Federal	1 capital district, Caracas	335 municipalities (municipios)	1,136 parishes (parroquias)	populated centers (centros poblados)	
Venezuela	Federal	Federal dependencies of 12 island groups	Francisco de Miranda Insular Territory, directly administered remainder			
Vietnam	Unitary	25 provinces (tỉnh)	709 wards (phường); 2,599 communes (xã); 13 special zones (đặc khu)	neighborhoods (khu phố) hamlets (xóm, ấp) villages (làng, thôn, bản)		
Vietnam	Unitary	9 cities (thành phố)	709 wards (phường); 2,599 communes (xã); 13 special zones (đặc khu)	neighborhoods (khu phố) hamlets (xóm, ấp) villages (làng, thôn, bản)		
Yemen	Unitary	21 governorates (muḥāfaẓāt); 1 municipality	333 districts	2,210+ [subdistricts]	38,284 [villages]	
Zambia	Unitary	10 provinces	89 districts	wards	villages	
Zimbabwe	Unitary	10 provinces	59 districts	1,200 wards	villages	

=== Member states of United Nations specialized agencies ===
Country	Type	Administrative divisions			
Country	Type	First-level	Second-level	Third-level	Fourth-level+
Kosovo	Unitary	7 districts	38 municipalities	1,400+ settlements (naselja)	

=== Other states ===
Country	Type	Administrative divisions			
Country	Type	First-level	Second-level	Third-level	Fourth-level+
Abkhazia	Unitary	7 districts (araion); City of Sukhumi	123 municipalities		
South Ossetia	Unitary	4 districts (raions); 2 cities			
Taiwan (Republic of China)	Regional	6 special municipalities (zhíxiáshì); 2 (streamlined) provinces (shěng) (Note: Nominal. All provincial governments are de facto abolished.)	13 counties (xiàn); 3 provincial cities (shì)	170 districts (qū); 12 county-administered cities (xiànxiáshì); 40 urban townships (zhèn); 146 rural townships (xiāng)	Urban villages (lǐ); Rural villages (cūn)
Somaliland	Unitary	6 regions (gobolada)	18 districts		
Northern Cyprus	Unitary	6 districts (ilçe)	subdistricts	components, quarters	
Transnistria	Unitary	5 districts 1 municipality, Tiraspol			
Sahrawi Arab Democratic Republic (notional, mostly occupied by Morocco)	Unitary	7 military regions 4 provinces (wilayat) (claimed)	25 districts (daïras) (claimed)		

== See also ==
- ISO 3166-2, codes for country subdivisions
- Capital districts and territories
- List of terms for country subdivisions
- List of national capitals serving as administrative divisions
- List of autonomous areas by country
- List of sovereign states
- Lists of political and geographic subdivisions by total area, comparing continents, countries, and first-level administrative country subdivisions.
- List of first-level administrative divisions by population
- List of FIPS region codes in FIPS 10-4, withdrawn from the Federal Information Processing Standard (FIPS) in 2008
- Nomenclature of Territorial Units for Statistics (NUTS), which covers the subdivisions of the members of the European Union
