= ISO 3166-2:BJ =

Entry for Benin in ISO 3166-2

ISO 3166-2:BJ is the entry for Benin in ISO 3166-2, part of the ISO 3166 standard published by the International Organization for Standardization (ISO), which defines codes for the names of the principal subdivisions (e.g., provinces or states) of all countries coded in ISO 3166-1.

Currently for Benin, ISO 3166-2 codes are defined for 12 departments.

Each code consists of two parts, separated by a hyphen. The first part is BJ, the ISO 3166-1 alpha-2 code of Benin. The second part is two letters.

== Current codes ==
Subdivision names are listed as in the ISO 3166-2 standard published by the ISO 3166 Maintenance Agency (ISO 3166/MA).

Click on the button in the header to sort each column.

Code	Subdivision name (fr)
BJ-AL	Alibori
BJ-AK	Atacora
BJ-AQ	Atlantique
BJ-BO	Borgou
BJ-CO	Collines
BJ-KO	Couffo
BJ-DO	Donga
BJ-LI	Littoral
BJ-MO	Mono
BJ-OU	Ouémé
BJ-PL	Plateau
BJ-ZO	Zou

== Changes ==
The following changes to the entry have been announced in newsletters by the ISO 3166/MA since the first publication of ISO 3166-2 in 1998. ISO stopped issuing newsletters in 2013.

Newsletter	Date issued	Description of change in newsletter	Code/Subdivision change
Newsletter I-2	2002-05-21	New subdivision layout: 12 departments. Six with previous names and six with new names	Subdivisions added: BJ-AL Alibori; BJ-CO Collines; BJ-DO Donga; BJ-KO Kouffo; BJ-LI Littoral; BJ-PL Plateau

The following changes to the entry are listed on ISO's online catalogue, the Online Browsing Platform:

Effective date of change	Short description of change (en)
2015-11-27	Change of spelling of BJ-AK, BJ-KO; update List Source

== See also ==
- Subdivisions of Benin
- FIPS region codes of Benin
- Neighbouring countries: BF, NE, NG, TG
