= ISO 3166-2:BF =

Entry for Burkina Faso in ISO 3166-2

ISO 3166-2:BF is the entry for Burkina Faso in ISO 3166-2, part of the ISO 3166 standard published by the International Organization for Standardization (ISO), which defines codes for the names of the principal subdivisions (e.g., provinces or states) of all countries coded in ISO 3166-1.

Currently for Burkina Faso, ISO 3166-2 codes are defined for two levels of subdivisions:

- 13 regions
- 45 provinces

Each code consists of two parts, separated by a hyphen. The first part is BF, the ISO 3166-1 alpha-2 code of Burkina Faso. The second part is either of the following:

- two digits (01–13): regions
- three letters: provinces

== Current codes ==
Subdivision names are listed as in the ISO 3166-2 standard published by the ISO 3166 Maintenance Agency (ISO 3166/MA).

Click on the button in the header to sort each column.

=== Regions ===
Code	Subdivision name (fr)
BF-01	Boucle du Mouhoun
BF-02	Cascades
BF-03	Centre
BF-04	Centre-Est
BF-05	Centre-Nord
BF-06	Centre-Ouest
BF-07	Centre-Sud
BF-08	Est
BF-09	Hauts-Bassins
BF-10	Nord
BF-11	Plateau-Central
BF-12	Sahel
BF-13	Sud-Ouest

=== Provinces ===
Code	Subdivision name (fr)	In region
BF-BAL	Balé	01
BF-BAM	Bam	05
BF-BAN	Banwa	01
BF-BAZ	Bazèga	07
BF-BGR	Bougouriba	13
BF-BLG	Boulgou	04
BF-BLK	Boulkiemdé	06
BF-COM	Comoé	02
BF-GAN	Ganzourgou	11
BF-GNA	Gnagna	08
BF-GOU	Gourma	08
BF-HOU	Houet	09
BF-IOB	Ioba	13
BF-KAD	Kadiogo	03
BF-KEN	Kénédougou	09
BF-KMD	Komondjari	08
BF-KMP	Kompienga	08
BF-KOS	Kossi	01
BF-KOP	Koulpélogo	04
BF-KOT	Kouritenga	04
BF-KOW	Kourwéogo	11
BF-LER	Léraba	02
BF-LOR	Loroum	10
BF-MOU	Mouhoun	01
BF-NAO	Nahouri	07
BF-NAM	Namentenga	05
BF-NAY	Nayala	01
BF-NOU	Noumbiel	13
BF-OUB	Oubritenga	11
BF-OUD	Oudalan	12
BF-PAS	Passoré	10
BF-PON	Poni	13
BF-SNG	Sanguié	06
BF-SMT	Sanmatenga	05
BF-SEN	Séno	12
BF-SIS	Sissili	06
BF-SOM	Soum	12
BF-SOR	Sourou	01
BF-TAP	Tapoa	08
BF-TUI	Tuy	09
BF-YAG	Yagha	12
BF-YAT	Yatenga	10
BF-ZIR	Ziro	06
BF-ZON	Zondoma	10
BF-ZOU	Zoundwéogo	07

== Changes ==
The following changes to the entry have been announced in newsletters by the ISO 3166/MA since the first publication of ISO 3166-2 in 1998. ISO stopped issuing newsletters in 2013.

Newsletter	Date issued	Description of change in newsletter	Code/Subdivision change
Newsletter II-2	2010-06-30	Update of the administrative structure and of the list source	Subdivisions added: 13 regions

The following changes to the entry are listed on ISO's online catalogue, the Online Browsing Platform:

Effective date of change	Short description of change (en)	Code/Subdivision change
2014-04-15	Correction of the short name lowercase in French	
2016-11-15	Change of spelling of BF-TUI; update list source	Spelling change: BF-TUI Tui → Tuy

== See also ==
- Subdivisions of Burkina Faso
- FIPS region codes of Burkina Faso
- Neighbouring countries: BJ, CI, GH, ML, NE, TG
