= ISO 3166-2:MR =

Entry for Mauritania in ISO 3166-2

ISO 3166-2:MR is the entry for Mauritania in ISO 3166-2, part of the ISO 3166 standard published by the International Organization for Standardization (ISO), which defines codes for the names of the principal subdivisions (e.g., provinces or states) of all countries coded in ISO 3166-1.

Currently for Mauritania, ISO 3166-2 codes are defined for 15 regions.

Each code consists of two parts, separated by a hyphen. The first part is MR, the ISO 3166-1 alpha-2 code of Mauritania. The second part is two digits (01–15) for the regions.

== Current codes ==
Subdivision names are listed as in the ISO 3166-2 standard published by the ISO 3166 Maintenance Agency (ISO 3166/MA).

Click on the button in the header to sort each column.

Code	Subdivision name (ar) (conventional names)	Subdivision name (ar) (BGN/PCGN 1956)	Subdivision name (ar) (Note: For reference only, Arabic name in Arabic script not included in the ISO 3166-2 standard.)	Subdivision name (fr) (conventional names)	Subdivision name (en) (Note: For reference only, English name not included in the ISO 3166-2 standard.)
MR-07	Adrar		آدرار		Adrar
MR-03	Assaba		لعصابة		Assaba
MR-05	Brakna		لبراكنة		Brakna
MR-08	Dakhlet Nouâdhibou		داخلت انواذيبو		Nouadhibou Peninsula
MR-04	Gorgol		گورگول		Gorgol
MR-10	Guidimaka		گيدي ماغا		Guidimaka
MR-01	Hodh ech Chargui		الحوض الشرقي		Eastern Basin
MR-02	Hodh el Gharbi		الحوض الغربي		Western Basin
MR-12	Inchiri		إنشيري		Inchiri
MR-14		Nuwākshūţ ash Shamālīyah	انواكشوط الشمالية	Nouakchott-Nord	North Nouakchott
MR-13		Nuwākshūţ al Gharbīyah	انواكشوط الغربية	Nouakchott-Ouest	West Nouakchott
MR-15		Nuwākshūţ al Janūbīyah	انواكشوط الجنوبية	Nouakchott-Sud	South Nouakchott
MR-09	Tagant		تگانت		Tagant
MR-11	Tiris Zemmour		تيرس زمور		Tiris Zemmour
MR-06	Trarza		اترارزة		Trarza

== See also ==
- Subdivisions of Mauritania
- FIPS region codes of Mauritania
- Neighbouring countries: DZ, EH, ML, SN
