= ISO 3166-2:TG =

Entry for Togo in ISO 3166-2

ISO 3166-2:TG is the entry for Togo in ISO 3166-2, part of the ISO 3166 standard published by the International Organization for Standardization (ISO), which defines codes for the names of the principal subdivisions (e.g., provinces or states) of all countries coded in ISO 3166-1.

Currently for Togo, ISO 3166-2 codes are defined for five regions.

Each code consists of two parts, separated by a hyphen. The first part is TG, the ISO 3166-1 alpha-2 code of Togo. The second part is a letter.

== Current codes ==
Subdivision names are listed as in the ISO 3166-2 standard published by the ISO 3166 Maintenance Agency (ISO 3166/MA).

Click on the button in the header to sort each column.

Code	Subdivision name (fr)	Subdivision name (en) (Note: For reference only, English name not included in the ISO 3166-2 standard.)
TG-C	Centrale	Central
TG-K	Kara	Kara
TG-M	Maritime (Région)	Maritime
TG-P	Plateaux	Plateaus
TG-S	Savanes	Savannahs

== See also ==
- Subdivisions of Togo
- FIPS region codes of Togo
- Neighbouring countries: BF, BJ, GH
