= Subdivisions of Togo =

Togo is divided into 5 regions, which are subdivided in turn into 30 prefectures and 1 commune, which are further subdivided in turn into 300+ cantons.

== Regions ==
ISO 3166-2:TG assigns codes for the 5 regions.
