= ISO 3166-2:SL =

Entry for Sierra Leone in ISO 3166-2

ISO 3166-2:SL is the entry for Sierra Leone in ISO 3166-2, part of the ISO 3166 standard published by the International Organization for Standardization (ISO), which defines codes for the names of the principal subdivisions (e.g. provinces or states) of all countries coded in ISO 3166-1.

Currently for Sierra Leone, ISO 3166-2 codes are defined for one area and four provinces. The Western Area contains the capital of the country Freetown and has special status equal to the provinces.

Each code consists of two parts, separated by a hyphen. The first part is SL, the ISO 3166-1 alpha-2 code of Sierra Leone. The second part is one or two letters.

== Current codes ==
Subdivision names are listed as in the ISO 3166-2 standard published by the ISO 3166 Maintenance Agency (ISO 3166/MA).

Subdivisions of Sierra Leone

Click on the button in the header to sort each column.

Code	Subdivision name (en)	Subdivision category
SL-E	Eastern	province
SL-NW	North Western	province
SL-N	Northern	province
SL-S	Southern	province
SL-W	Western Area (Freetown)	area

== Changes ==
The following changes to the entry are listed on ISO's online catalogue, the Online Browsing Platform:

Effective date of change	Short description of change (en)
2019-11-22	Addition of an asterisk to SL-NW; Update Code Source
2018-11-26	Addition of province SL-NW; Update List Source

== See also ==
- Subdivisions of Sierra Leone
- FIPS region codes of Sierra Leone
- Neighbouring countries: GN, LR
