= ISO 3166-2:SN =

Entry for Senegal in ISO 3166-2

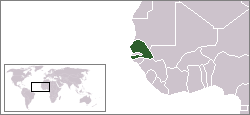
Location of Senegal

ISO 3166-2:SN is the entry for Senegal in ISO 3166-2, part of the ISO 3166 standard published by the International Organization for Standardization (ISO), which defines codes for the names of the principal subdivisions (e.g., provinces or states) of all countries coded in ISO 3166-1.

Currently for Senegal, ISO 3166-2 codes are defined for 14 regions.

Each code consists of two parts, separated by a hyphen. The first part is SN, the ISO 3166-1 alpha-2 code of Senegal. The second part is two letters.

== Current codes ==
Subdivision names are listed as in the ISO 3166-2 standard published by the ISO 3166 Maintenance Agency (ISO 3166/MA).

Click on the button in the header to sort each column.

Code	Subdivision name (fr)
SN-DK	Dakar
SN-DB	Diourbel
SN-FK	Fatick
SN-KA	Kaffrine
SN-KL	Kaolack
SN-KE	Kédougou
SN-KD	Kolda
SN-LG	Louga
SN-MT	Matam
SN-SL	Saint-Louis
SN-SE	Sédhiou
SN-TC	Tambacounda
SN-TH	Thiès
SN-ZG	Ziguinchor

== Changes ==
The following changes to the entry have been announced in newsletters by the ISO 3166/MA since the first publication of ISO 3166-2 in 1998:

Newsletter	Date issued	Description of change in newsletter	Code/Subdivision change
Newsletter I-5	2003-09-05	Addition of one new region. List source updated	Subdivisions added: SN-MT Matam
Newsletter II-2	2010-06-30	Update of the administrative structure and languages and update of the list source	Subdivisions added: SN-KA Kaffrine; SN-KE Kédougou; SN-SE Sédhiou

== See also ==
- Subdivisions of Senegal
- FIPS region codes of Senegal
- Neighbouring countries: GM, GN, GW, ML, MR
