= ISO 3166-2:LR =

Entry for Liberia in ISO 3166-2

ISO 3166-2:LR is the entry for Liberia in ISO 3166-2, part of the ISO 3166 standard published by the International Organization for Standardization (ISO), which defines codes for the names of the principal subdivisions (e.g., provinces or states) of all countries coded in ISO 3166-1.

Currently for Liberia, ISO 3166-2 codes are defined for 15 counties.

Each code consists of two parts, separated by a hyphen. The first part is LR, the ISO 3166-1 alpha-2 code of Liberia. The second part is two letters.

== Current codes ==
Subdivision names are listed as in the ISO 3166-2 standard published by the ISO 3166 Maintenance Agency (ISO 3166/MA).

Click on the button in the header to sort each column.

Code	Subdivision name (en)
LR-BM	Bomi
LR-BG	Bong
LR-GP	Gbarpolu
LR-GB	Grand Bassa
LR-CM	Grand Cape Mount
LR-GG	Grand Gedeh
LR-GK	Grand Kru
LR-LO	Lofa
LR-MG	Margibi
LR-MY	Maryland
LR-MO	Montserrado
LR-NI	Nimba
LR-RI	River Cess (Local variant: Rivercess)
LR-RG	River Gee
LR-SI	Sinoe

== Changes ==
The following changes to the entry have been announced in newsletters by the ISO 3166/MA since the first publication of ISO 3166-2 in 1998:

Edition/Newsletter	Date issued	Description of change in newsletter	Code/Subdivision change
ISO 3166-2:2007	2007-12-13	Second edition of ISO 3166-2 (this change was not announced in a newsletter)	Subdivisions added: LR-GP Gbarpolu; LR-RG River Gee

== See also ==
- Subdivisions of Liberia
- FIPS region codes of Liberia
- Neighboring countries: CI, GN, SL
