= ISO 3166-2:ML =

Entry for Mali in ISO 3166-2

ISO 3166-2:ML is the entry for Mali in ISO 3166-2, part of the ISO 3166 standard published by the International Organization for Standardization (ISO), which defines codes for the names of the principal subdivisions (e.g., provinces or states) of all countries coded in ISO 3166-1.

Currently for Mali, ISO 3166-2 codes are defined for one district and ten regions. The district Bamako is the capital of the country and has special status equal to the regions.

Each code consists of two parts separated by a hyphen. The first part is ML, the ISO 3166-1 alpha-2 code of Mali. The second part is either of the following:

- three letters: district
- 1 or 2 digits (1–10): regions

The codes for the regions are assigned roughly from west to east.

== Current codes ==
Subdivision names are listed as in the ISO 3166-2 standard published by the ISO 3166 Maintenance Agency (ISO 3166/MA).

Click on the button in the header to sort each column.

Code	Subdivision name (fr)	Subdivision category
ML-BKO	Bamako	district
ML-7	Gao	region
ML-1	Kayes	region
ML-8	Kidal	region
ML-2	Koulikoro	region
ML-9	Ménaka	region
ML-5	Mopti	region
ML-4	Ségou	region
ML-3	Sikasso	region
ML-10	Taoudénit (local variants are Taoudenni, Taoudéni)	region
ML-6	Tombouctou	region

== See also ==
- Subdivisions of Mali
- FIPS region codes of Mali
- Neighbouring countries: BF, CI, DZ, GN, MR, NE, SN
