= ISO 3166-2:NE =

Entry for Niger in ISO 3166-2

ISO 3166-2:NE is the entry for Niger in ISO 3166-2, part of the ISO 3166 standard published by the International Organization for Standardization (ISO), which defines codes for the names of the principal subdivisions (e.g., provinces or states) of all countries coded in ISO 3166-1.

Currently for Niger, ISO 3166-2 codes are defined for one urban community and seven regions. The urban community Niamey is the capital of the country and has special status equal to the regions.

Each code consists of two parts separated by a hyphen. The first part is NE, the ISO 3166-1 alpha-2 code of Niger. The second part is a digit:

- 1–7: regions
- 8: urban community

== Current codes ==
Subdivision names are listed as in the ISO 3166-2 standard published by the ISO 3166 Maintenance Agency (ISO 3166/MA).

Click on the button in the header to sort each column.

Code	Subdivision name (fr)	Subdivision category
NE-1	Agadez	region
NE-2	Diffa	region
NE-3	Dosso	region
NE-4	Maradi	region
NE-8	Niamey	urban community
NE-5	Tahoua	region
NE-6	Tillabéri	region
NE-7	Zinder	region

== See also ==
- Subdivisions of Niger
- FIPS region codes of Niger
- Neighbouring countries: BF, BJ, DZ, LY, ML, NG, TD
