= ISO 3166-2:GH =

Entry for Ghana in ISO 3166-2

ISO 3166-2:GH is the entry for Ghana in ISO 3166-2, part of the ISO 3166 standard published by the International Organization for Standardization (ISO), which defines codes for the names of the principal subdivisions (e.g., provinces or states) of all countries coded in ISO 3166-1.

Currently for Ghana, ISO 3166-2 codes are defined for 16 regions.

Each code consists of two parts, separated by a hyphen. The first part is GH, the ISO 3166-1 alpha-2 code of Ghana. The second part is two letters.

== Current codes ==
Subdivision names are listed as in the ISO 3166-2 standard published by the ISO 3166 Maintenance Agency (ISO 3166/MA).

Click on the button in the header to sort each column.

Code	Subdivision name (en)
GH-AF	Ahafo
GH-AH	Ashanti
GH-BO	Bono
GH-BE	Bono East
GH-CP	Central
GH-EP	Eastern
GH-AA	Greater Accra
GH-NE	North East
GH-NP	Northern
GH-OT	Oti
GH-SV	Savannah
GH-UE	Upper East
GH-UW	Upper West
GH-TV	Volta
GH-WP	Western
GH-WN	Western North

== Former codes ==
Code	Subdivision name (en)
GH-BA	Brong-Ahafo

== Changes ==
The following changes to the entry are listed on ISO's online catalogue, the Online Browsing Platform:

Effective date of change	Short description of change (en)
2019-11-22	Deletion of region GH-BA; Addition of regions GH-AF, GH-BE, GH-BO, GH-NE, GH-OT, GH-SV, GH-WN; Update List Source
2015-11-27	Update List Source
2014-11-03	Update List Source

== See also ==
- Subdivisions of Ghana
- FIPS region codes of Ghana
- Neighbouring countries: BF, CI, TG
