= ISO 3166-2:GN =

Entry for Guinea in ISO 3166-2

ISO 3166-2:GN is the entry for Guinea in ISO 3166-2, part of the ISO 3166 standard published by the International Organization for Standardization (ISO), which defines codes for the names of the principal subdivisions (e.g., provinces or states) of all countries coded in ISO 3166-1.

Currently for Guinea, ISO 3166-2 codes are defined for two levels of subdivisions:

- seven administrative regions and one governorate
- 33 prefectures

The governorate Conakry is the capital of the country and has special status equal to the administrative regions.

Each code consists of two parts, separated by a hyphen. The first part is GN, the ISO 3166-1 alpha-2 code of Guinea. The second part is either of the following:

- one letter: administrative regions and governorate
- two letters: prefectures

== Current codes ==
Subdivision names are listed as in the ISO 3166-2 standard published by the ISO 3166 Maintenance Agency (ISO 3166/MA).

Click on the button in the header to sort each column.

=== Administrative regions and governorate ===
Code	Subdivision name (fr)	Subdivision category
GN-B	Boké	administrative region
GN-F	Faranah	administrative region
GN-K	Kankan	administrative region
GN-D	Kindia	administrative region
GN-L	Labé	administrative region
GN-M	Mamou	administrative region
GN-N	Nzérékoré	administrative region
GN-C	Conakry	governorate

=== Prefectures ===
Code	Subdivision name	In administrative region
GN-BE	Beyla	N
GN-BF	Boffa	B
GN-BK	Boké	B
GN-CO	Coyah	D
GN-DB	Dabola	F
GN-DL	Dalaba	M
GN-DI	Dinguiraye	F
GN-DU	Dubréka	D
GN-FA	Faranah	F
GN-FO	Forécariah	D
GN-FR	Fria	B
GN-GA	Gaoual	B
GN-GU	Guékédou	N
GN-KA	Kankan	K
GN-KE	Kérouané	K
GN-KD	Kindia	D
GN-KS	Kissidougou	F
GN-KB	Koubia	L
GN-KN	Koundara	B
GN-KO	Kouroussa	K
GN-LA	Labé	L
GN-LE	Lélouma	L
GN-LO	Lola	N
GN-MC	Macenta	N
GN-ML	Mali	L
GN-MM	Mamou	M
GN-MD	Mandiana	K
GN-NZ	Nzérékoré	N
GN-PI	Pita	M
GN-SI	Siguiri	K
GN-TE	Télimélé	D
GN-TO	Tougué	L
GN-YO	Yomou	N

== Changes ==
The following changes to the entry have been announced in newsletters by the ISO 3166/MA since the first publication of ISO 3166-2 in 1998:

Edition/Newsletter	Date issued	Description of change in newsletter	Code/Subdivision change
Newsletter I-2	2002-05-21	One governorate changed into a city (new subdivision level). One code corrected	Codes: (to correct duplicate use); Koundara: GN-KD → GN-KN
ISO 3166-2:2007	2007-12-13	Second edition of ISO 3166-2 (this change was not announced in a newsletter)	
Newsletter II-1	2010-02-03 (corrected 2010-02-19)	Addition of the country code prefix as the first code element, deletion of the generic term in subdivision names	

== See also ==
- Subdivisions of Guinea
- FIPS region codes of Guinea
- Neighbouring countries: CI, GW, LR, ML, SL, SN
