= List of terms for administrative divisions =

This is a list of English and non-English terms for administrative divisions.

== English ==
- Bailiwick
- Border
- Borough
- Canton
- City
- Commune
- State (constituent)
- County
- Department
- District
- Duchy
- Emirate
- Federal state
- State (federative)
- Governorate
- Hundred
- Metropolitan Area
- Municipality
- Parish
- Prefecture
- Province
- Region
- Regency
- Rural district
- Shire
- Subdistrict
- Subdivision
- Subprefecture
- Town
- Township
- Village
- Viceroyalty
- Voivodeship

== Non-English ==
This is an alphabetical list of native non-English terms for administrative divisions; some, such as arrondissement and okrug, have become English loanwords. Terms in italics are prefixes or suffixes.

Name	Countries	English equivalents
amphoe	Thailand	district
Amt	Germany	county (formerly; the modern term is kreis, which means literally "circle")
amt	Denmark	county (replaced with regions in 2007)
amt	Norway	county (formerly; the modern term is fylke)
apskritis	Lithuania	county
anakhett	Cambodia	prefecture
arrondissement	Netherlands	borough, district
arrondissement	French-speaking countries	borough, district
autónoma	Spanish-speaking countries	autonomous
autônomo, autônoma	Portuguese-speaking countries	autonomous
автоно́мный (avtonomny)	Russia	autonomous
aimag (аймаг)	Mongolia	province
baladiyah (baladiyat)	Arab countries	municipality
barangay	Philippines	village (rural) or ward
bairro	Brazil	neighbourhood, district
bairro	Portugal	neighbourhood, district
bairro	Mozambique	neighbourhood, district
barrio	Spanish-speaking countries	neighbourhood, district
бановина (banovina)	Yugoslavia	banate, province
bayan	Philippines	municipality
Bezirk	Austria	district
Bezirk	Switzerland	district
Bezirk	Germany	district
Bundesland	Germany (colloquial term)	federal state
Bundesland	Austria (colloquial term)	federal state
bibhag	Bangladesh	division
bwrdeistref	Wales	borough county
canton (French) cantone (Italian) chantun (Romansh); Kanton (German)	Switzerland	canton
kanton (Bosnian)	Bosnia and Herzegovina	canton
castello	San Marino	municipality
changwat	Thailand	province
chef-lieu	France	chief town or city
comarca	Portuguese-speaking countries (judicial system)	county
comarca	Spanish-speaking countries	county
comuna	Angola	division of município
comuna	Spanish-speaking countries	commune
comună	Romania	rural commune
comune	Italy	municipality
comunidad	Spain	community
comunidade intermunicipal	Portugal	intermunicipal community
comunidade urbana	Portugal	urban community
concelho	Cape Verde	municipality; synonym of município
concelho	Portugal	municipality; synonym of município
corregimiento	Panama	subdivision of a distrito
daerah	Malay-speaking countries	district
provinsi	Indonesia	province
Daerah Istimewa	Indonesia	Special District, all are first level (provincial level)
Daerah Khusus Ibukota	Indonesia	Exclusive Capital District, refers to DKI Jakarta only.
dào (Mandarin)	China	circuit
deelgemeente	Belgium	submunicipality
demos (δήμος)	Greece	municipality
departamento	Latin America (Spanish-speaking countries)	department
département	French-speaking countries	department
desa	Indonesia	village
district	Suriname	district
distrik	Indonesia	district
distrito	Portugal	group of municipalities
distrito	São Tomé and Príncipe	municipality
distrito	Philippines	district
distrito	Spanish-speaking countries	district
distrito, distritu	Timor-Leste	municipality
distrito federal	Brazil	federal district
dō	Japan	circuit
do	North Korea	circuit
do	South Korea	circuit
dombon	Cambodia	area or region
dzongkhag	Bhutan	district
estado	Brazil	federal state
estado	Mexico	federal state
estado	Venezuela	federal state
etrap	Turkmenistan	district
freguesia	Cape Verde	civil parish
freguesia	Portugal	civil parish
fylke	Norway	county
gemeente	Belgium ( Flanders)	municipality
gemeente	Netherlands	municipality
Gemeinde	Austria	municipality
Gemeinde	Germany	municipality
Gemeinde	Italy	municipality
Gemeinde	Switzerland	municipality
gewog	Bhutan	block
gmina	Poland	commune, municipality
gobolka	Somalia	administrative region
gouvernorat	Guinea	governorate
grande área metropolitana	Portugal	greater metropolitan area
губе́рния (guberniya)	Russian Empire	governorate
hameau	France	hamlet
hanua	Papua New Guinea	village
iduhu	Papua New Guinea	clan
raj	India	empire
rajya	India	state
il or vilayet	Turkey	province
ilçe	Turkey	district
imarah	Arab countries (formerly)	emirate
imarah	United Arab Emirates	emirate
jamoat	Tajikistan	commune or municipality
járás	Hungary	district
Jilla	Nepal	district
județ	Moldova (formerly)	county
județ	Romania	county
jurydyka	Poland	village
kabupaten	Indonesia	regency
kampung or kampong	Malay-speaking countries and Cambodia	village, hamlet, neighbourhood
kasselrij	Netherlands	county or burgraviate
kecamatan	Indonesia	district
kelurahan	Indonesia	(urban) village or subdistrict
ken	Japan	prefecture
khan	Cambodia	district or section
khett	Cambodia	province
khoueng	Laos	province
khum	Cambodia	commune
kilil	Ethiopia	region
kommun	Finland (Swedish speaking)	municipality
kommun	Sweden	municipality
kommune	Denmark	municipality
kommune	Norway	municipality
kota	Indonesia	chartered city
кожуун (kozhuun)	Russia ( Tyva Republic)	rural council
край (krai)	Russia	region
kraj	Czech Republic	region
kraj	Slovakia	region
Kreis	Germany	district
krom	Cambodia	group
krong	Cambodia	municipality
ku	Japan	ward
kunta	Finland	municipality
lääni	Finland	province
lalawigan	Philippines	province
län	Sweden	county
Land	Austria (official term)	state
Land	Germany (official term)	state
lieu-dit	France	place name
linn	Estonia	town or city
lugar	Cape Verde	division of zona in Cape Verde
lugar	Portugal	hamlet
lungsod	Philippines	city
maakond	Estonia	county
մարզ (marz)	Armenia	province or region
maḥoz	Israel	district
mancomunidad	Spain	association of municipalities, commonwealth
merindad	Medieval Spain	county
mesorregião	Brazil	mesoregion (division of estado)
minṭaqah (minṭaqat)	Arab countries	province, region
microrregião	Brazil	microregion (division of mesorregião, group of municípios)
მხარე (mkhare)	Georgia	region
muban	Thailand	village
muḥafaẓah (muḥafaẓat)	Arab countries	governorate
mukim	Malay-speaking countries	subdistrict, subdivision of subdistrict, survey district
municipalidad	Latin America (Spanish-speaking countries)	municipality
municipio	Spanish-speaking countries	municipality
municipio	Portuguese-speaking countries	municipality
nafa	Israel	subdistrict
negeri	Malaysia	state
nomos	Greece	prefecture
novads	Latvia	municipality (amalgamated urban areas without town rights)
NUTS	Europe	Nomenclature of Territorial Units for Statistics
obec	Czech Republic	municipality
obec	Slovakia	municipality
область (oblast)	Countries formerly in the Soviet Union or Yugoslavia	province, region
община (obshtina)	Bulgaria	municipality
okres	Czech Republic	district
okres	Slovakia	district
okrug	Serbia	district
okrug	Russia	district
opština	Republika Srpska	municipality
opština	Montenegro	municipality
opština	Serbia	municipality
ostan (ostan-e)	Iran	province
pagasts	Latvia	parish
panchayati raj	India	village council
paróquia	Portugal	parish (religious division)
paróquia	Cape Verde	parish (religious division)
parroquia	Spain ( Galicia)	parish
parroquia	Andorra	parish
pedanía	Spain	county
Περιφέρειες (periféreia)	Greece	periphery
phum	Cambodia	village
phumpheak	Cambodia	zone
pilseta	Latvia	town/city
povit	Ukraine	county
powiat	Poland	county
pradesh	India	state of India
pradesh	Nepal	province of Nepal
probinsya	Philippines	province
provinsi	Indonesia	province
provincia	Spanish-speaking countries	province
provincia	Italy	province
província	Portugal (formerly)	province
província	Angola	province
província	São Tomé and Príncipe	province
prowincja	Poland	province
purok	Philippines	district or zone
raion	Russia	district
raion	Moldova	district
raion	Ukraine	district
rajons	Latvia	district
região	Brazil	group of estados; also macrorregião
região	Guinea-Bissau	region
região	Portugal	region
região autónoma	Portugal	autonomous region
região autónoma	São Tomé and Príncipe	autonomous region
regierungsbezirk	Germany	district
region	Denmark	region
regione	Italy	region
şäher	Turkmenistan	capital city district
sangkat	Cambodia	commune or quarter
sector	Guinea-Bissau	sector (municipality)
sector autónomo	Guinea-Bissau	autonomous sector (municipality)
сельсовет (selsoviet)	Russia	rural council
shěng/shêng	China; Taiwan	province
shì/shih	China; Taiwan	city
sitio	Philippines	district or zone
շրջան (shrjan)	Republic of Artsakh	province or region
hromada	Ukraine	municipality
srŏk	Cambodia	district
sum	Mongolia	district
subdistrito, subdistritu	Timor-Leste	administrative post
subregião	Portugal	subregion
suco, suku	Timor-Leste	division of administrative post
-stan	Central Asian countries	land (denotes high level of autonomy)
sýsla	Faroe Islands	district
sýsla	Iceland	district
tambon	Thailand	subdistrict
thesaban	Thailand	municipality
tỉnh	Vietnam	province
todōfuken	Japan	prefectural level divisions (collectively)
tuman	Uzbekistan	district
ulus	Russia ( Sakha Republic)	district
upazila	Bangladesh	subdistrict
union parishad	Bangladesh	council or constituency
mouza	Bangladesh	mouza
gram/gaon	Bangladesh	village
Ward	Bangladesh	ward
vald	Estonia	parish, rural municipality
vármegye	Hungary	county
вилоят (viloyat)	Tajikistan	region
вилоят (viloyat)	Uzbekistan	region
во́лость (volost)	Russia	district
wojewodztwo	Poland	voivodeship
waterschap	Netherlands	water board
welaýaty	Turkmenistan	region
wilayah	Arab countries	province, territory
wilayah	Malaysia	province, territory
xiàn/hsien	China; Taiwan	county
země	Czech Republic	land (historical)
zona	Cape Verde	zone (division of freguesia)
ziemia	Poland	land
Zillah	Pakistan	district
Zillah	Bangladesh	district
Zillah	India	district
župa	Slovakia	county (historical)
županija	Bosnia and Herzegovina (Croatian speaking)	county
županija	Croatia	county
maahaanam	Sri Lanka (Tamil speaking)	province
maavattam	Sri Lanka (Tamil speaking)	district
pirathesam/koattam	Sri Lanka (Tamil speaking)	division
palaatha	Sri Lanka (Sinhala speaking)	province
dhisthrikaya	Sri Lanka (Sinhala speaking)	district
kottahsha	Sri Lanka (Sinhala speaking)	division

== See also ==
- Administrative division
- Census division
  - Census-designated place - statistical territorial subdivisions in the United States
- List of administrative divisions by country
