= ISO 3166-2:CI =

Entry for Côte d'Ivoire in ISO 3166-2

ISO 3166-2:CI is the entry for Côte d'Ivoire in ISO 3166-2, part of the ISO 3166 standard published by the International Organization for Standardization (ISO), which defines codes for the names of the principal subdivisions (e.g., provinces or states) of all countries coded in ISO 3166-1.

Currently for Côte d'Ivoire, ISO 3166-2 codes are defined for 12 districts and two autonomous districts.

Each code consists of two parts, separated by a hyphen. The first part is CI, the ISO 3166-1 alpha-2 code of Côte d'Ivoire. The second part is two letters.

== Current codes ==
Subdivision names are listed as in the ISO 3166-2 standard published by the ISO 3166 Maintenance Agency (ISO 3166/MA).

Click on the button in the header to sort each column.

Code	Subdivision name (fr)	Subdivision name (en)	Subdivision category
CI-AB	Abidjan	Abidjan	autonomous district
CI-BS	Bas-Sassandra	Lower Sassandra	district
CI-CM	Comoé	Comoé	district
CI-DN	Denguélé	Denguélé	district
CI-GD	Gôh-Djiboua	Gôh-Djiboua	district
CI-LC	Lacs	Lakes	district
CI-LG	Lagunes	Lagoons	district
CI-MG	Montagnes	Mountains	district
CI-SM	Sassandra-Marahoué	Sassandra-Marahoué	district
CI-SV	Savanes	Savannahs	district
CI-VB	Vallée du Bandama	Bandama Valley	district
CI-WR	Woroba	Woroba	district
CI-YM	Yamoussoukro	Yamoussoukro	autonomous district
CI-ZZ	Zanzan	Zanzan	district

== Changes ==
The following changes to the entry have been announced in newsletters by the ISO 3166/MA since the first publication of ISO 3166-2 in 1998. ISO stopped issuing newsletters in 2013.

Newsletter	Date issued	Description of change in newsletter	Code/Subdivision change
Newsletter I-8	2007-04-17	Modification of the administrative structure	Subdivisions added: CI-17 Bafing; CI-18 Fromager; CI-19 Moyen-Cavally

The following changes to the entry are listed on ISO's online catalogue, the Online Browsing Platform:

Effective date of change	Short description of change (en)
2015-11-27	Deletion of all regions CI-01 to CI-19; addition of districts CI-BS, CI-CM, CI-DN, CI-GD, CI-LC, CI-LG, CI-MG, CI-SM, CI-SV, CI-VB, CI-WR, CI-ZZ; addition of autonomous districts CI-AB, CI-YM; update List Source
2016-11-15	Update Code Source

=== Codes before 27 November 2015 ===
Former code	Subdivision name (fr)
CI-06	18 Montagnes (Région des)
CI-16	Agnébi (Région de l')
CI-17	Bafing (Région du)
CI-09	Bas-Sassandra (Région du)
CI-10	Denguélé (Région du)
CI-18	Fromager (Région du)
CI-02	Haut-Sassandra (Région du)
CI-07	Lacs (Région des)
CI-01	Lagunes (Région des)
CI-12	Marahoué (Région de la)
CI-19	Moyen-Cavally (Région du)
CI-05	Moyen-Comoé (Région du)
CI-11	Nzi-Comoé (Région)
CI-03	Savanes (Région des)
CI-15	Sud-Bandama (Région du)
CI-13	Sud-Comoé (Région du)
CI-04	Vallée du Bandama (Région de la)
CI-14	Worodougou (Région du)
CI-08	Zanzan (Région du)

== See also ==
- Subdivisions of Côte d'Ivoire
- FIPS region codes of Côte d'Ivoire
- Neighbouring countries: BF, GH, GN, LR, ML
