= ISO 3166-2:NG =

Entry for Nigeria in ISO 3166-2

ISO 3166-2:NG is the entry for Nigeria in ISO 3166-2, part of the ISO 3166 standard published by the International Organization for Standardization (ISO), which defines codes for the names of the principal subdivisions (e.g., provinces or states) of all countries coded in ISO 3166-1.

Currently for Nigeria, ISO 3166-2 codes are defined for one capital territory and 36 states. The Federal Capital Territory contains the capital of the country Abuja and has special status equal to the states.

Each code consists of two parts separated by a hyphen. The first part is NG, the ISO 3166-1 alpha-2 code of Nigeria. The second part is two letters.

== Current codes ==
Subdivision names are listed as in the ISO 3166-2 standard published by the ISO 3166 Maintenance Agency (ISO 3166/MA).

Click on the button in the header to sort each column.

Code	Subdivision name (en)	Subdivision category
NG-AB	Abia	state
NG-FC	Abuja Federal Capital Territory	capital territory
NG-AD	Adamawa	state
NG-AK	Akwa Ibom	state
NG-AN	Anambra	state
NG-BA	Bauchi	state
NG-BY	Bayelsa	state
NG-BE	Benue	state
NG-BO	Borno	state
NG-CR	Cross River	state
NG-DE	Delta	state
NG-EB	Ebonyi	state
NG-ED	Edo	state
NG-EK	Ekiti	state
NG-EN	Enugu	state
NG-GO	Gombe	state
NG-IM	Imo	state
NG-JI	Jigawa	state
NG-KD	Kaduna	state
NG-KN	Kano	state
NG-KT	Katsina	state
NG-KE	Kebbi	state
NG-KO	Kogi	state
NG-KW	Kwara	state
NG-LA	Lagos	state
NG-NA	Nasarawa	state
NG-NI	Niger	state
NG-OG	Ogun	state
NG-ON	Ondo	state
NG-OS	Osun	state
NG-OY	Oyo	state
NG-PL	Plateau	state
NG-RI	Rivers	state
NG-SO	Sokoto	state
NG-TA	Taraba	state
NG-YO	Yobe	state
NG-ZA	Zamfara	state

== Changes ==
The following changes to the entry have been announced in newsletters by the ISO 3166/MA since the first publication of ISO 3166-2 in 1998:

Newsletter	Date issued	Description of change in newsletter	Code/Subdivision change
Newsletter I-1	2000-06-21	Addition of 6 new states	Subdivisions added: NG-BY Bayelsa; NG-EB Ebonyi; NG-EK Ekiti; NG-GO Gombe; NG-NA Nassarawa; NG-ZA Zamfara
Newsletter II-2	2010-06-30	Consistency between ISO 3166-1 and ISO 3166-2, addition of names in administrative languages	

== See also ==
- Subdivisions of Nigeria
- FIPS region codes of Nigeria
- Neighbouring countries: BJ, CM, NE, TD
