= Comarca =

Local administrative division in Portugal and Spain

A comarca (Spanish: [koˈmaɾka], Portuguese: [kuˈmaɾkɐ], Catalan: [kuˈmarkə], Galician: [koˈmaɾka̝]) is a traditional region or local administrative division found in Portugal, Spain, and some of their former colonies, like Brazil, Nicaragua, and Panama. The term is derived from the term marca, meaning a "march, mark", plus the prefix co-, meaning "together, jointly".

The comarca is known in Aragonese as redolada (Aragonese pronunciation: [reðoˈlaða]) and in Basque as eskualde (IPA: [es̺kualde]). In addition, in Galician, comarcas are also called bisbarras (IPA: [bizˈβarɐs]).

Although the English word "county" and its near synonym "shire" have similar meanings, they are usually translated into Spanish and Portuguese as condado, a term which in the Iberian Peninsula refers only to regions historically ruled by a conde (count or earl). However, "comarca" is occasionally used such as in the Spanish Wikipedia entry for comarca and some translations of The Lord of the Rings (see below).

== Community of Portuguese Language Countries ==
In the Community of Portuguese Language Countries (CPLP), comarcas are used as follows.

=== Historical ===
From the Middle Ages until the 16th century, the comarcas corresponded to the large administrative divisions of Portugal. There were six such traditional divisions: Entre-Douro-e-Minho, Trás-os-Montes, Beira, Estremadura, Alentejo and Algarve, of which the last had the honorary title of "kingdom". In the 16th century, the comarcas started gradually to be referred to as "provinces".

The name "comarca" was then applied to the new administrative and judicial subdivisions of the provinces, created in the 17th century. Each comarca corresponded to the territorial area of jurisdiction of a corregedor, a high-ranking administrative and judicial officer who represented the Crown in the district.

In the 19th century, the comarcas were replaced by separate administrative and judicial divisions to reflect the implementation of the separation of executive and judicial powers. The new administrative divisions became the administrative districts and the new judicial divisions kept the name comarca.

=== Present ===
In Brazil, Portugal, and some other countries of the Community of Portuguese Language Countries, the comarca now is the basic territorial division in the judicial system. It corresponds to the territorial area of jurisdiction of a court of first instance.

The comarca may correspond to a municipality or group several small municipalities together. Presently, in Brazil, there are 2,680 comarcas. A judiciary organization reform implemented in Portugal in 2014 reduced the number of comarcas from 231 to 23.

According to the new judicial division of 2015, Angola will be again subdivided into 60 comarcas, each with a court of first instance. The courts of comarca will replace the previous provincial and municipal courts.

Comarca is also the name of a suburb of Luanda, the capital of Angola.

== Mexico ==
The ninth-largest metropolitan area in Mexico is known as the Comarca Lagunera. The region is made up of 15 municipalities, including the cities of Torreón, Coahuila, Gómez Palacio and Lerdo Durango.

== Panama ==
In Panama, the comarca indígena is an administrative region for an area with a substantial Amerindian population. Four comarcas (Emberá-Wounaan, Guna Yala, Naso Tjër Di, and Ngöbe-Buglé) exist as equivalent to provinces. Two smaller comarcas (Guna de Madugandí and Guna de Wargandí) are subordinate to a province and considered equivalent to a corregimiento.

== Spain ==
The term comarca is used in several regions in Spain:

- In Asturias, the historic division is the conceyu (pl. conceyos, concejo or municipio in Spanish). Currently, there are several comarcas but they are contemporary creations destined to tourism promotions, without administrative or government powers.
- In Cantabria, the comarca is a traditional or historical division, usually identified with the greatest rivers of the region.
- In Catalonia and Aragon, the comarca is a local government area, administered by a comarcal council.
- In the Valencian Community, the comarca is a traditional region with no administrative competences. They are legally referred as homologated territorial demarcations instead of as comarques.
- In Galicia the comarca or bisbarra are traditional divisions of the land that have limited official recognition, but have no administrative relevance. However, the Galician government is attempting to transform the bisbarras into territorial administrative tiers, to create a new regional network proposed to be more balanced and efficient. Galician comarcas also have a comarcal council.

In other places, such as Extremadura, the comarca may refer simply to a loosely defined region.

Because of the word's long-standing use, comarca is sometimes used as the basis for the promotion of tourism with emphasis on local cultural tradition and history.

== Fiction ==
Some Spanish-language editions of the British writer J. R. R. Tolkien's works use the term La Comarca as a translation for the English "The Shire".

== See also ==
- Comarcas of Aragon
- Comarcas of Asturias
- Comarcas of Galicia
- Comarques of Catalonia
- Comarques of the Valencian Community
- Comarques of Northern Catalonia
- Commune (administrative division)
- Kecamatan
- List of terms for administrative divisions
- Provinces of Panama
