= Villages of Botswana =

Political subdivisions

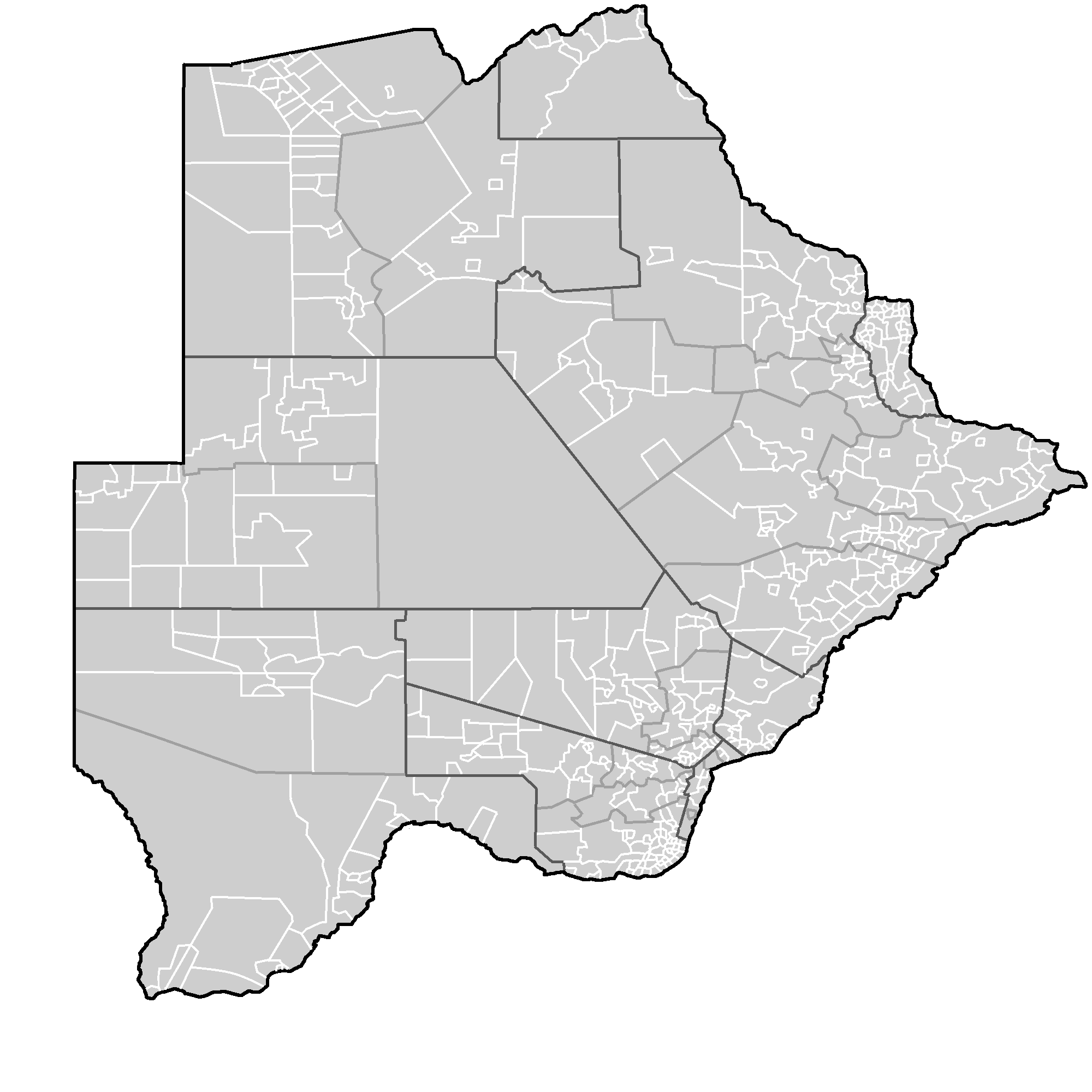
Map of the 519 village divisions of Botswana.

Botswana's 23 sub-districts are further broken up into 519 villages. These are further subdivided into associated localities & non-associated localities.
