= Subdivisions of Benin =

Benin is divided into 12 departments (French: départements), and subdivided into 77 communes.

On the third level are the arrondissements of Benin.

== Departments ==
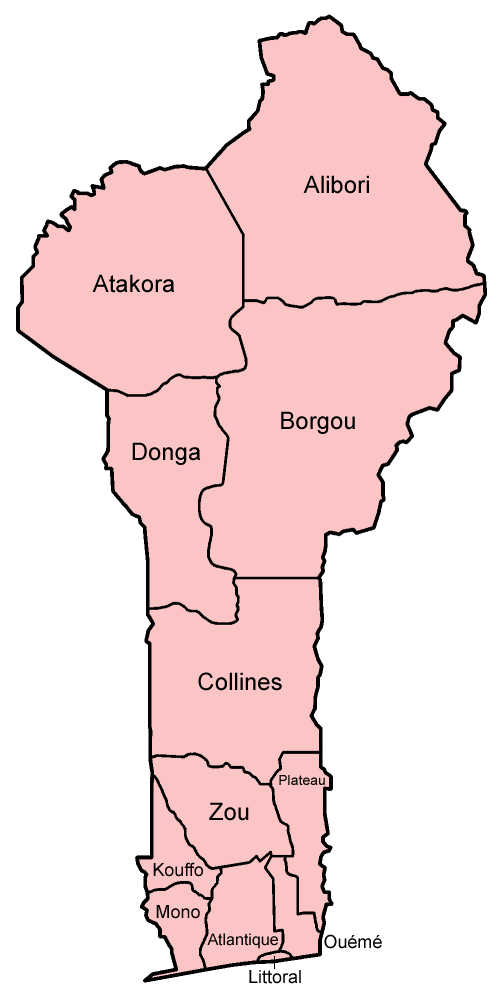
Departments of Benin

In 1999, the previous six departments were each split into two halves, forming the current 12. The six new departments were assigned official capitals in 2008.

Department	Capital	Population (2013)	Area (km^{2})
Alibori	Kandi	868,046	26,242
Atakora	Natitingou	769,337	20,499
Atlantique	Ouidah	1,396,548	3,233
Borgou	Parakou	1,202,095	25,856
Collines	Savalou	716,558	13,931
Kuoffo	Dogbo-Tota	741,895	2,404
Donga	Djougou	542,605	11,126
Littoral	Cotonou	678,874	79
Mono	Lokossa	495,307	1,605
Ouémé	Porto-Novo	1,096,850	1,281
Plateau	Sakete	624,146	3,264
Zou	Abomey	851,623	5,243
