= Subdivisions of Mauritania =

Structure description

Mauritania is divided into 12 wilayahs and capital district in Nouakchott, its capital district. These wilayahs are subdivided into 53 mouaghataas, or departments.

There are 216 communes of Mauritania.

The regions and capital district (in alphabetical order) and their capitals are:

Region	Capital
Adrar	Atar
Assaba	Kiffa
Brakna	Aleg
Dakhlet Nouadhibou	Nouadhibou
Gorgol	Kaédi
Guidimaka	Sélibaby
Hodh Ech Chargui	Néma
Hodh El Gharbi	Ayoun el Atrous
Inchiri	Akjoujt
Nouakchott (capital district)
Tagant	Tidjikdja
Tiris Zemmour	Zouerat
Trarza	Rosso
