= Subdivisions of Burkina Faso =

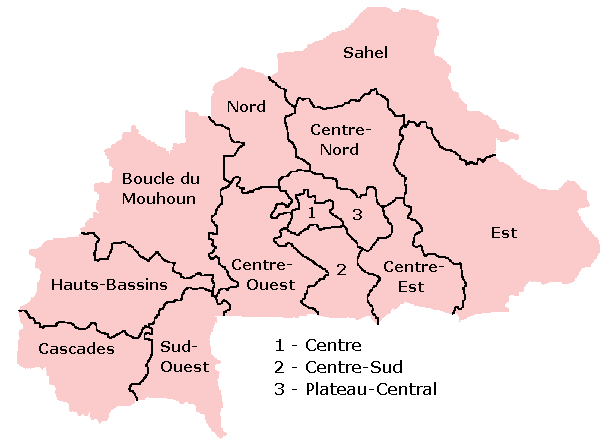
Regions of Burkina Faso prior to 2025.

Burkina Faso is divided into seventeen regions and forty-seven provinces, following a July 2025 restructuring. Before the 2025 reforms, it had thirteen regions, forty-five provinces, and 368 departments, communes, or arrondissements.

Since 2012, every department includes now a single commune (municipality) covering all urbanized areas in the department and representing its population for local elections (by village, or by urban sector within cities and towns). Two very populated departments (Ouagadougou and Bobo-Dioulasso) are also further subdivided into arrondissements, which split their capital city (and also cover all surrounding villages): their urban commune have a specific status.

== Regions ==
In 2025, four new regions were created and the names of the regions were changed from French, the former official language, to Mossi or other national languages. The current list of regions, with their old names in parentheses, is:

- Bankui (was Boucle du Mouhoun)
- Djôrô (was Sud-Ouest)
- Tannounyan (was Cascades)
- Goulmou (was Est)
- Guiriko (was Hauts-Bassins)
- Kadiogo (was Centre)
- Koulsé (was Centre-Nord)
- Liptako (was Sahel)
- Nakambé (was Centre-Est)
- Nando (was Centre-Ouest)
- Nazinon (was Centre-Sud)
- Oubri (was Plateau-Central)
- Sirba (new region)
- Soum (new region)
- Sourou (new region)
- Tapoa (new region)
- Yaadga (was Nord)

Prior to the 2025 reform, the thirteen regions were:

- Boucle du Mouhoun
- Cascades
- Centre
- Centre-Est
- Centre-Nord
- Centre-Ouest
- Centre-Sud
- Est
- Hauts-Bassins
- Nord
- Plateau-Central
- Sahel
- Sud-Ouest
