= ISO 3166-2:GW =

Entry for Guinea-Bissau in ISO 3166-2

ISO 3166-2:GW is the entry for Guinea-Bissau in ISO 3166-2, part of the ISO 3166 standard published by the International Organization for Standardization (ISO), which defines codes for the names of the principal subdivisions (e.g., provinces or states) of all countries coded in ISO 3166-1.

Currently for Guinea-Bissau, ISO 3166-2 codes are defined for two levels of subdivisions:

- three provinces
- one autonomous sector and eight regions

The autonomous sector Bissau is the capital of the country and has special status equal to the regions.

Each code consists of two parts, separated by a hyphen. The first part is GW, the ISO 3166-1 alpha-2 code of Guinea-Bissau. The second part is either of the following:

- one letter: provinces
- two letters: autonomous sector and regions

== Current codes ==
Subdivision names are listed as in the ISO 3166-2 standard published by the ISO 3166 Maintenance Agency (ISO 3166/MA).

Click on the button in the header to sort each column.

=== Provinces ===
Code	Subdivision name (pt)	Subdivision name (en) (Note: For reference only, English name not included in the ISO 3166-2 standard.)
GW-L	Leste	East
GW-N	Norte	North
GW-S	Sul	South

=== Autonomous sector and regions ===
Code	Subdivision name (pt)	Local variant	Subdivision category	In province
GW-BA	Bafatá		region	L
GW-BM	Biombo		region	N
GW-BS	Bissau	SAB	autonomous sector	—
GW-BL	Bolama / Bijagós		region	S
GW-CA	Cacheu		region	N
GW-GA	Gabú		region	L
GW-OI	Oio		region	N
GW-QU	Quinara		region	S
GW-TO	Tombali		region	S

== Changes ==
The following changes to the entry have been announced in newsletters by the ISO 3166/MA since the first publication of ISO 3166-2 in 1998:

Newsletter	Date issued	Description of change in newsletter
Newsletter II-1	2010-02-03 (corrected 2010-02-19)	Addition of the country code prefix as the first code element
Online Browsing Platform (OBP)	2020-11-24	Change of subdivision name of GW-BL; Addition of local variation of GW-BS; Update List Source

== See also ==
- Subdivisions of Guinea-Bissau
- FIPS region codes of Guinea-Bissau
- Neighbouring countries: GN, SN
