= Cansunco =

- Village
- Location in Guinea-Bissau
- Coordinates: 11°42′45″N 14°41′34″W
- Country: Guinea-Bissau
- Region: Bafatá Region
- Sector: Xitole
- Time zone: UTC+0 (GMT)

Cansunco is a village in the Bafatá Region of southern-central Guinea-Bissau. It lies to the northwest of Chumael.
