= Subdivisions of Guinea-Bissau =

Subdivisons of Guinea-Bissau, a West African country

Guinea-Bissau is divided into eight regions (regiões) and one autonomous sector (sector autónomo). These, in turn are subdivided into 37 sectors (singular: setor, plural: setores); which are further subdivided into smaller groups called sections (singular: secção, plural: secções); which are further subdivided into populated places (i.e.: towns, villages, localities, settlements, communities, etc.). Here are the following listed below:

== Regions ==
- Bafatá
- Biombo
- Bissau*
- Bolama
- Cacheu
- Gabu
- Oio
- Quinara
- Tombali

• autonomous sector

Map of the regions of Guinea-Bissau
