= Ondame =

- Village
- Location in Guinea-Bissau
- Coordinates: 11°46′N 15°56′W
- Country: Guinea-Bissau
- Region: Biombo
- Sector: Quinhámel
- Time zone: UTC+0 (GMT)

Ondame is a village in the Biombo Region of Guinea-Bissau.

== Location ==
It lies on the coast, west of Bissau where the Mansoa River flows into the sea.
