= Papel people =

Ethnic group found in Guinea-Bissau, Casamance (Senegal), and Guinea

Papel
Total population
- 183,000 in Guinea Bissau; 9,000 worldwide

Regions with significant populations
- Casamance (Senegal), Guinea Bissau (traditionally in Biombo Region) and Guinea

Languages
- Papel, French, Portuguese

Religion
- Christianity (usually Roman Catholics), Islam, but also practice animism

Related ethnic groups
- Mankagnes, Manjack and Beafada

Papels, also known as Moium, Oium, Papei, Pepel or Pelels, are an ethnic group primarily located in Guinea-Bissau, though are also found in Casamance (Senegal) and Guinea. Their population in Guinea-Bissau is about 183,000, with 9,000 living outside of the country. They traditionally engaged in hunting and agriculture.

== History ==
=== Origins ===
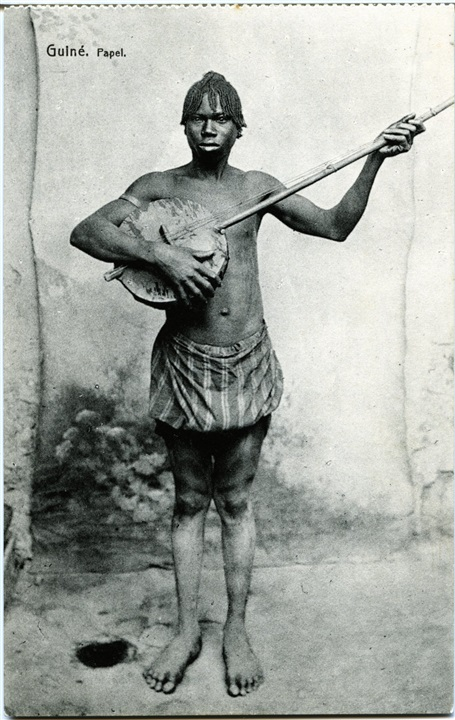
Guinea, Papel people. Probable busunde or ngopata lute, related to the akonting and banjo.

According to oral history, a man named Mecau, the son of a king from the Kingdom of Quinara on the south of the river Geba, arrived at Bissau on one of his hunting trips. He opted to reside there due to its fertile soil and established a kingdom. From Quinara he brought his pregnant sister Punguenhum and his six wives: Intende, Djokom, Mala, Intsoma, Kliker and Intchipolo. Mecau invited other subjects from his father's kingdom to settle the area of Bissau alongside him. From his sister and six wives seven main Papel clans arose.

- The N'nssassun (plural, bossassun) clan comes from the line of Punguenhum. This line inherited commandership roles in the form of kings and nobles (In Kriol, Jagras). They are represented by the Leopard. Surnames tend to be 'Le' and have traditionally lived in the Bissau region.
- The N'nsso (plural, Bosso) clan from the line of Mala traditionally lived in the Bandim region of Bissau. Due to their historical speciality and dedication to agriculture they represented themselves as the Frog. Their surnames tend to be 'Co'.
- The N'ndjukomo (plural, Bodjukumo) clan from the line of Intsoma traditionally lived in the Alto Crim region of Bissau. They are the second most important clan behind the Bossassun. This clan saw themselves as fearless warriors and represented themselves as the Hyena. Surnames tend to be 'Ca'.
- The N'nsafinte (plural, Bosafinte) clan from the line of Djokom traditionally lived in the Safim region of Biombo. They saw themselves as cunning and were represented by the hare. They tend to hold the surname 'Te'.
- The N'niga (plural, Boiga) clan from the line of Kliker traditionally lived in the Calequir region of Bissau, and they represented themselves as the Goat due to their speed. They tend to hold the surname 'Sa'.
- The N'nssuzu (plural, Bossuzu) clan from the line of Intende traditionally lived in the Mindara region of Bissau and were represented by the Aardvark. They usually hold the surname 'Dju'.
- The N'nttat (plural, Bottat) from the line of Intchipolo traditionally lived in the Bissalanca region of Bissau. They were represented by the Monkey because their main occupation was to climb trees and extract palm wine. Their surnames tend to be 'Indi'.

The Kingdom of Bissau and the vassal states that belonged to the Papel in the Biombo used a matrilineal line of succession, in which the son of the sovereign's maternal sister was next in line for kingship, or to the nearest male relative in the King's maternal grandparents' line. Individuals would inherit their mother's clan name, although in later times the father's name could and would be taken.

DNA studies

The paternal lineage of the Papels is suggested to be distinct within the Guinean population, with E1-M33 discovered in high frequencies amongst the Papels. L3e2b was more exclusively found in the Papel, this haplogroup resembles haplogroups found in East and Central Africa. These findings conclude that in the Papel history there was a migration from East Africa, and the conservation of this lineage is due to the short amount of time the Papels have been in Guinea-Bissau, further suggesting that Papels have not been in Guinea-Bissau for as long as previously believed.

The presence of U5b1b in the Papel population represented a possible genetic link to the Saami of Scandinavia and North African Berbers, suggested to be due to post-glacial expansion. This U5b1b lineage suggests expansion coming over the strait of Gibraltar, and developing into a local West African cluster.

=== European contact ===
==== 1600–1700 AD ====
The earliest contact between the Papel and European is dated to as early as the late 16th century. André Álvares de Almada singled out Bissau as a safe haven for the Portuguese and routinely used it as a refuge for ships under attack from other Europeans. The king of Bissau, Equendé, was said to be a 'best friend' of the Portuguese due to an event in which Barreira encountered a king in Bissau in the year 1605. The relationship as mentioned was pleasant with King Equendé ruling in 1663, relations were so friendly Lemos Coelho encouraged a movement of persons from Cacheu to Bissau due to the excellent treatment of Lançados in the Kingdom of Bissau. In 1680, Papel forces aided in the Portuguese liberation of the Cacheu Fort.

Friendly relations carried on until the reign of King Bacompol Co (1687–1696).Evidenced by the exchanging of gifts between Fr. Francisco de Pinhel and the king, friendly relations were to carry on for another six to seven years. The aware of the benefits of trade allowed all Europeans ships into his ports, an example was the French in which negotiations between the French official De la Courbe, and the king ending in the refusal of the construction of a French fort, construction of a trading factory was permitted, and south of the Gambia the kingdom became the French trading centre. Between 1685 and 1688 the French trading factory exported around 2,800 slaves from the area. The main exports traded between the kingdom and the Europeans were slaves, wax, and ivory. The trade was characteristic of a tax that all traders had to pay to the king of Bissau, all traders were subject to this tax whether they were Portuguese, French, American or English.

From 1683 to 1686 three Catholic missionaries oversaw a church in the kingdom in an attempt to Christianise the Papel population, due to conflicting interests and overlap between missionary work and trading this put them at odds with the Portuguese who in later years constituted the majority of the missionaries in Bissau. The Papel referred to the Portuguese as brancos ('whites') and others as estrangeiros ('strangers'). Relations with non-Portuguese Europeans varied; for example, the Papel held a grudge against the French after a French frigate opened fire on the kingdom. The Portuguese and Papel relations became solidified in April 1694 with the conversion of King Bacompol Co to Catholicism, making him the first Christian king of Bissau. This conversion allowed for even closer relations between the Portuguese and Papels with the Portuguese request of a fort being accepted, and the king being willing to keep out other Europeans from his ports in favour of sole Portuguese trade. The concession of the Portuguese fort was significant as earlier in 1687 the fort was attempted but overthrown by the king of Bissau's troops. Soon after, Bacompol Co wrote to King Peter II of Portugal informing him of his conversion and requesting from the Portuguese more weapons, missionaries, footstools, a bed, a sun hat and a gown. He gave eight of his sons to the Cape Verdean Bishop to be educated. The eldest son, Batonto, was sent to Lisbon for his baptism, where the king of Portugal was named his godfather, and he was given the new name of 'Manuel'.

In 1696 in consequence of the kings decision to allow the construction of the Fort of Bissau, Bissau was elevated to the status of captaincy, as prior the overseer of the trade was lieutenant-captain but even this seemed to be purely nominal with no weight behind it, the title was before given to the influential Afro-Portuguese trader Barnabé Lopez who was related to the ruling house of Bissau but it was just 'honorary'. The title of captaincy and Portuguese authority was given to Jose Pinheiro, who at the time was also captain of Cacheu.

The year 1696 was marked by King Bacompol Co's death, and with it the good relations between the Portuguese Empire and Kingdom of Bissau. On 5 May 1696, the kingdom and throne were split between two noblemen: Incinha Te and Toro Co. Toro Co was Bacompol Co's maternal brother, while Incinha Te, through a different maternal line, was by Papel standards the rightful heir to the throne. The Portuguese refrained from outwardly siding with either camp, though both Jose Pinheiro and bishop of Cape Verde Fr Victoriano Portuense favoured Toro Co since he had converted to Christianity. Furthermore, the ecclesiastics of Bissau believed Toro Co more likely to uphold the nine-point policies that the king Bacompol Co had previously agreed to:

1. To build a fort on the previously chosen site
2. To treat Christians with love and courtesy
3. The king was to be a Christian and allow conversion freely
4. Permission to remove Xina (Animist images) from Christian settlements
5. Christians were subject to Portuguese laws, rather than local laws
6. Segregation between Christians and non-Christians
7. Non-Christians were unable to inherit goods of Christians
8. No commerce should be done with other Europeans, and the king should defend the ports against them
9. No Christian should be punished by local law, and only by Portuguese law

A nobleman named Antoma had the right of crowning the king, and crowned Toro Co, making him the rightful king of Bissau. However the issue was not solved, as the king of Guinala also had rights to the throne of Bissau. It was customary after two to three years of ruling for the king of Bissau to request a crown from the king of Guinala. However, Bacompol Co ruled for nine years without doing so, using the crown of his predecessors instead. Incinha Te with his troops requested the crown from the king of Guinala, who acquiesced, and he found another noble to perform the coronation for him. Incinha Te marched to Bissau and seized its port, boycotting trade with Toro Co. After gaining support from Barnabé Lopez and a large amount of the Afro-Portuguese community, he was able to oust Toro Co as the king and make himself the sole ruler of Bissau.

In contrast to Portuguese fears, Incinha Te did support the nine-point policy to an extent. He converted to Christianity and permitted the construction of a fort. But issues arose when Incinha Te complained about the sacrilege of the Xina's by Jose Pinheiro to the king of Portugal. Incinha Te and the bishop had a contentious relationship, unlike his predecessor. Incinha Te accused the bishop of enslaving his relatives, who were sent to Lisbon years prior. It did not help that the bishop supported Toro Co instead of him. Relations were also sour between Jose Pinheiro and the bishop, which culminated in November 1696, when escaped slaves from the fort fled into Balanta territory under the pursuit of four Portuguese and several indigenous soldiers. Two soldiers drowned and the rest were captured by the Balanta. The bishop went to Balanta territory to ransom the soldiers, and on his return an assassination was attempted, speculated to be authorised by both Pinheiro and Incinha Te. In response the bishop had five Papels (two related to the king) seized and sent to Geba. In response, Incinha Te had a church, priests living quarters, and another house within the fort burnt to the ground. The rift between Pinheiro and Incinha Te grew larger, due to Pinheiro placing the blame for the assassination attempt on Incinha Te.

In December 1696 the already fragile relations between the Portuguese and Papel came to a boiling point when Pinheiro turned away two English ships from the port of Bissau. Incinha Te dispatched his governor and three nobleman to confront Pinheiro. Pinheiro claimed that he was doing the duty asked of him by the king of Portugal, and the Portuguese presence was a benefit to the Papels. During a subsequent confrontation, Pinheiro said the Papels would trade with foreigners "over his dead body". In response, Incinha Te sentenced Pinheiro to death. Inside the unfinished fort Pinheiro and his forces were besieged by Papel forces and cut off from food and water. However, rapid assistance from Cacheu and Geba was forthcoming in the form of Captain Santos de Vidigal Castanho with a force of more than 400 troops.A settlement was negotiated between Castanho's and Incinha Te's nobles under the condition that Pinheiro be removed as captain. Four days later Pinheiro fired on a Dutch ship coming into port. Incinha Te warned Pinheiro if he carried on the walls of the fort would be pulled down and the occupants beheaded. On 5 February Pinheiro was captured by Incinha Te, imprisoned, and executed.

Rodrigo de Fonseca, the successor captain to Pinheiro, improved relations with the Papels. He was unable to stop Incinha Te's demand for free trade, but Fonseca was able to persuade Incinha Te to make ships anchor out of range of the fort's guns. Fonseca reported in April 1699 that an Afro-Portuguese trader called Maria Soares returned from Sierra Leone to Bissau with a cargo full of Kola. When asked to pay duties to the Portuguese she protested, and Incinha Te intervened on her behalf. At another point, Fonseca complained that two Dutch ships avoided paying 10% duties to the Portuguese.

The construction of forts were seen as a way to counter the issue of sovereignty in the area, and even when permission was granted by the Kings of Bissau it was never made easy. The Papels refused to provide the Portuguese with any labour or raw material to aid in the construction of their forts, and at times even water would be withheld from the Portuguese. These forts were seen as an encroachment on Papel land, but the granting of them in name allowed commerce to continue.

To the Portuguese the abandoning of the fort made the most sense in light of all these issues, only further accentuated by the sporadic rebellions to their presence by the Papels, and at this time Mandinka in Farim.

==== 1700–1800 AD ====
In 1701 the Fort of Bissau was abandoned for the Fort of Cacheu. At the time the French attempted to negotiate with Incinha Te to allow the construction of a French fort in the area, mirroring the previous response the French were denied. The mid-18th century saw the return of the Portuguese to Bissau, in an attempt to carry on with the construction of their former fort. These plans were protested by the Papel, leading to several violent confrontations, in which the Papel suffered around 500 casualties, leading to a Portuguese victory. A peace treaty was signed between King Palan Co and the Portuguese in 1753, which included permission for the Portuguese to finish the construction of their fort, reinstating the Portuguese captaincy of Bissau using Cape Verdean soldiers to fortify their position. The peace treaty did little in the way of subduing the Papels, and skirmishes and revolts would still be common place between the Portuguese and the Kingdom of Bissau for centuries to come.

==== 1800–1900 AD ====
April 1844 saw the arrival of general governor Francisco de Paula Bastos and several high-ranking officials from Cape Verde. On 11 September the king of Intim, a king from a vassal state to the king of Bissau, was expelled from the Portuguese trading post, and in the following altercation a Papel man was killed by Portuguese soldiers. The Papels retaliated, attacking people inside the fort, sacking several of the trading houses for their contents, and attacking the house of Joao Marques de Barros. Barros, with the aid of machine gun fire, forced the Papels to retreat. The Papel forces set up ambushes outside the fortress walls and resumed hostilities with the Portuguese. The Portuguese, lacking sufficient supplies of ammunition, gunpowder, and soldiers, were forced to request foreign assistance from the British in Gambia and French in Goreia. French assistance arrived on 4 October in the form of a corvette ship stationed on the coast of Bissau. It was positioned there for 12 days, where it continued a series of successful bombardments of the coastal villages and liberated the Portuguese trading post. After the French departure on 16 October, British forces arrived, playing a smaller part than the French but making their presence known. An American ship was also ported at Bissau under the command of a T.W. Freelon. In the face of Portuguese, English, and French forces, the Papel forces carried on with their hostilities up until 19 December 1844, when a peace treaty between the Portuguese and Papels was signed. The peace treaty involved a ceasefire on the Portuguese side. During the time of peace the Portuguese forces reorganised and requested more military units from Cape Verde. On arrival the Cape Verdean forces performed a surprise attack, reigniting the war with the Papels.

A new governor, Pedro Ignácio de Gouveia, was installed on 17 December 1881, with the main aim of subduing the populations of Guinea-Bissau. These aims were called the "Pacification Campaigns" and saw a push to subdue and force the payment of taxes from all the population in 1882. Two years after the start of the campaign in 1884, it reached the areas inhabited by the Papels. On 5 May 1884, the secretary general José Joaquim de Almeida was given the task of subduing the Papels of Biombo and Manjacos of Caió. In Biombo this campaign did not start well, with naval battles taking place on the river Geba between the Portuguese and Papels, who were able to effectively use their war canoes to intercept and harass Portuguese schooners. Later, the war started to favour the Portuguese. On 7 May, due to the refusal of one of the Chiefs of Silho, a village in Biombo, to comply, Silho was machine gunned and bombed by Portuguese forces. The chief persisted in his refusal, resulting in the landing of 30 naval soldiers under four officers. The village was partially destroyed with the Portuguese only receiving three casualties in the assault, and is considered the first Portuguese victory in Biombo in the 19th century.

In 1884–1885 the Berlin Conference sought to partition the territories of Africa between the European powers of the time. The conference motivated the Portuguese to put more effort into subduing the population of Guinea-Bissau, due to the conference requiring a colony to be "effectively occupied" to be seen as legitimate. The Portuguese were not strong enough to defeat the Papel forces, nor able to bring any of the vassal states or Kingdom of Bissau into "effective occupation".

The Papel territory of Bissau was in a constant state of intense warfare, particularly from 1884 to 1915, because of Portuguese and Papel forces. On 14 February 1891, when the Portuguese called a meeting to adjust the current peace treaty between them, Antula, Intim and for them to submit to Portuguese authority of which only chiefs of Antula agreed to. This situation caused war to break out with the other Papel vassal states attacking the Portuguese fortress eight days later, and killing the soldiers guarding the bastions though the Portuguese defended themselves effectively until reinforcements arrived. The attack plunged the region into a state of hostilities with the Portuguese declaration of war on the next day, banning the sales of guns and gunpowder to the natives, and increasing gunboat patrols of the local waters. On 24 February 120 Portuguese troops accompanied by five officers marched into Papel territory, the troops were crushed by the Papels and forced to retreat. On 9 March that year the Portuguese once again were defeated by the Papels, and in the month of May during the Portuguese attempt under Minister Antonio Eanes to extend the wall of one of their fortresses, the Papels opened fire on them handing the Portuguese another defeat, this led to Papel warriors replacing their necklaces usually decorated with beads with the teeth of their fallen enemies. The relationship between the Papels and Portuguese were so sour that the Papels would watch the fortress continuously, waiting for people to leave, this occurred when a Cape Verdean left the fortress and was set upon by Papels and killed, they were reported to then of gathered at the top of Intim celebrating the killing with war dances and making preparations for war. This is what they got, the Portuguese on 1 December declared war on the Papels once again for the murder, they bombarded Bissau with artillery pieces and would regularly enter gunfights with the Papels, this attack did not result in a Papel full out attack which confused the Portuguese into a belief of victory. The Papel lack of response was due to their mobilisation of other ethnicities into the war such as the Balanta, the Papel had planned a sneak attack on 7 December but even though it came as a surprise, the Portuguese were able to escape defeat due to the increased security they prepared around the fortress.

==== 1900–2000 AD ====
The Portuguese suffered major defeats from the Papels during their pacification campaign in the years 1891, 1894, and 1904. After the Republican take over and reformation of Portugal in 1910 changes to the colonial approach in Guinea-Bissau were implemented, such changes were necessary due to the situation in the colony which is summarised in the writings of Portuguese military officer Teixeira Pinto:

… notwithstanding the heroic battles of some Portuguese, after setbacks and cruel massacres to our prestige, our [Portuguese] colony of Guiné had returned to being a simple occupation of fortresses, which were threatened by the consequences of a new revolt more complete or more violent."

Teixeira Pinto was the military officer entrusted by the Republican government to finally subdue the Papels, and in May 1915 Teixeira ordered the Papel to surrender their weapons and pay their taxes in the form of a letter to King N'Kanande Ka of Bissau. He rejected the demand, claiming that "The ground...will forever belong to the Papel people". Teixeira was furious and on 13 May he declared war on the Kingdom of Bissau. Hostilities began on 29 May where observing a shuttle of boats from a river bank Papel forces began unleashing gunfire on to Portuguese troops, in response Portuguese troops set machine gun fire on them. Teixeira gave the orders to continuously bombard the territory of Antula. On 31 May an attack was launched by the Papel on Portuguese troops transporting artillery near a Portuguese town, who in turn returned gunfire. The day after this attack, the Portuguese responded with the use of machine gunning on Papel villages. The war continued with this back and forth style of warfare, at one point in a show of resistance the Papel forces proactively advanced on Portuguese troops and their auxiliaries, the Papels descended upon them from the heights of Intim by the thousands. However, with no real success up to this point, Pinto marched on Bandim and Intim on 5 June with a large collection of artillery, and with a force of 1500 soldiers consisting of Fula's and other indigenous conscripts. This was to cover Abdul Injai who was marching on Antula. The Papels tried to defend their position through the use of continuous gunfire, but in the face of skilled soldiers armed with machine guns they could do little and were defeated at Bandim. Pinto was injured during the battle of Jaal in Safim on 12 June, during an ambush when Papels hiding on higher ground fired on the marching troops. It is believed that a Papel soldier named N'djilonde Ca was the one who shot Teixeira off his horse. Teixeira was replaced with Lieutenant Henrique de Sousa Guerra, who took command of the operations against the Papels in Quisset and Prabis. Antula was conquered due an event in which the majority Papel soldiers of Antula went to a peace talk between their chiefs and the Portuguese governor, here they got drunk and on the way back to Antula they were attacked by the Portuguese and defeated. The Papel response to this was to sack villages and loot the stores the week after.

Once the objective of subduing the Papels was accomplished in these areas of Bissau, the Portuguese marched on to Quinhamel in the area of Biombo. It was in this region on 20 July 1915 that King N'Kanande Ka incorporated a false surrender, firing upon the column of Portuguese forces and signalling the Papel forces to make a final attack. The final attack was a failure and N'Kanande was captured by the Portuguese and sentenced to death by Teixeira Pinto. He was tortured and buried alive while his pregnant wife was shot.

The death of N'Kanande Ka ended the revolts and resistance of the Papels against the Portuguese, and solidified their subsequent submission to Portuguese authority and tax. As a sign of their defeat Teixeira had military posts constructed in the areas of Bor, Safim, Bijimita, and Biombo. The wars against the Papel were some of the bloodiest wars in the whole campaign, according to Abdul Injai, an important warlord whose assistance was instrumental in the conquest of Guinea-Bissau.

== Demography ==
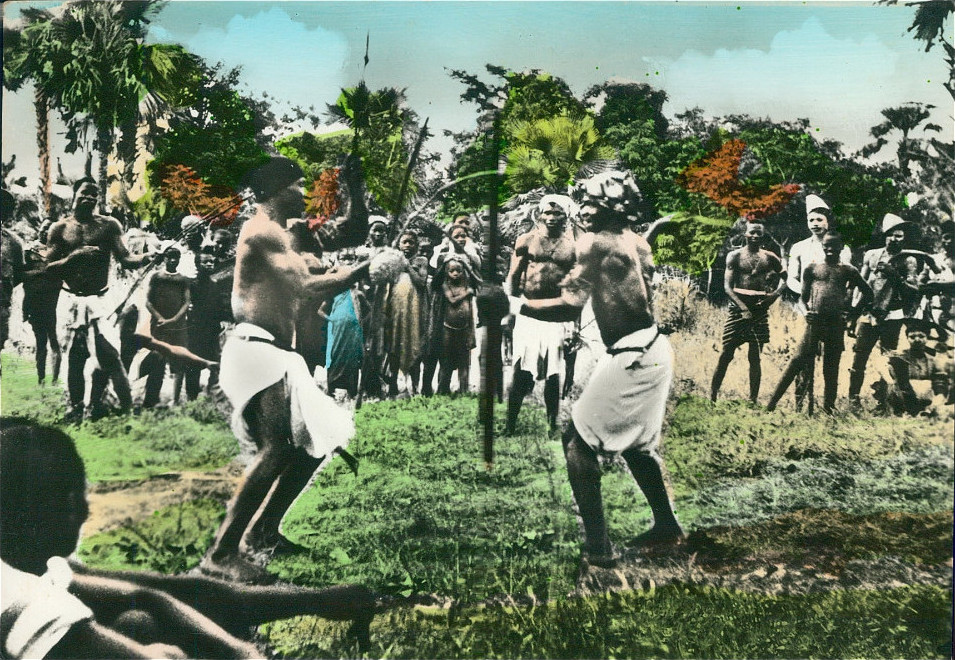
Mantampa Fight of two Papel men (60s).

The Papel people live traditionally around the city of Bissau, in the Biombo Region. They are linguistically and culturally close to mankagnes and Manjack or Manjacas. They are traditionally farmers. So, they have one of the most suitable land for rice cultivation. Like the Manjacks, their names are Portuguese because of the Portuguese occupation of the country from the late 15th century until 1973. Surnames characteristic of this ethnic group are: Pereira, Lopes, Vieira, Correia, Monteiro, Ca, etc.

Their language is the Papel, which is one of the Niger–Congo languages. The estimated number of speakers was 136,000 in Guinea-Bissau in 2006.

== Religion ==
Most Papel are Christians, usually Catholic, but also Animists. Ancestor worship is an important part of the culture, like in many African communities. For example, after a burial ceremony honouring "Toka Chur", held from a few months to several years after the actual funeral, has social prestige.

== Notable people ==
- João Bernardo Vieira
- Ahmad Mendes Moreira
- Bruno Martins Indi
- Carlos Mendes Gomes
- Danilo Pereira
- Eder
- Edinho
- Zé Gomes
- Madger Gomes
- Henri Saivet
- Joseph Mendes
- Jorge Reixa
- Tito Júnior
- Romario Vieira
- Ronaldo Vieira
- Victor Correia
- Welket Bungué
- Whoopi Goldberg
- Marcelino da Mata, Portuguese Army Lieutenant Colonel who served in the Portuguese Colonial War in his native Guinea-Bissau
- Zezinho
- Zé Turbo
