= Dan Ialá =

Bissau-Guinean politician

Member of the National People's Assembly for Catió and Komo
- Incumbent
- Assumed office 2014

Personal details
- Party: PAIGC

Dan Iala N’Canha Baranção, commonly known as Dan Ialá, is a Bissau-Guinean politician from the African Party for the Independence of Guinea and Cape Verde (PAIGC). She was first elected to the National Assembly in the 2014 general election and appointed Second Secretary of the Parliamentary Bureau. In 2015, she served as President of the Organising Committees of the 67th Executive Committee session of the African Parliamentary Union and the 38th Conference of Presidents of African National Parliamentary Assemblies. In February 2018, Ialá was elected by the Central Committee members to the Standing Committee of the PAIGC. During the 2019 presidential election, she served as deputy director for the campaign of Domingos Simões Pereira, the PAIGC's candidate. She was re-elected to the National Assembly in 2019 representing the Catió and Komo sectors of the Tombali Region. Following the 2019 election, she was appointed as First Secretary of the Parliamentary Bureau. In February 2020, after the disputed 2019 Guinea-Bissau presidential election, Ialá unsuccessfully attempted to inaugurate Cipriano Cassamá as president.
