= Mampata =

- Village
- Location in Guinea-Bissau
- Coordinates: 11°38′11″N 14°41′15″W
- Country: Guinea-Bissau
- Region: Bafatá Region
- Sector: Xitole
- Time zone: UTC+0 (GMT)

Mampata is a large village in the Bafatá Region of central Guinea-Bissau. It lies near the northern bank of the Corubal River, southwest of Chumael.

There is another village named Mampata several kilometres to the southwest, to the west of Quebo.
