= Chumael =

- Village
- Location in Guinea-Bissau
- Coordinates: 11°41′N 14°39′W
- Country: Guinea-Bissau
- Region: Bafatá Region
- Sector: Xitole
- Time zone: UTC+0 (GMT)

Chumael is a village in the Bafatá Region of southern-central Guinea-Bissau. It lies to the northeast of Mampata and the Corubal River.
