= List of regions of Guinea-Bissau by Human Development Index =

This is a list of regions of Guinea-Bissau by Human Development Index as of 2025 with data for the year 2023.

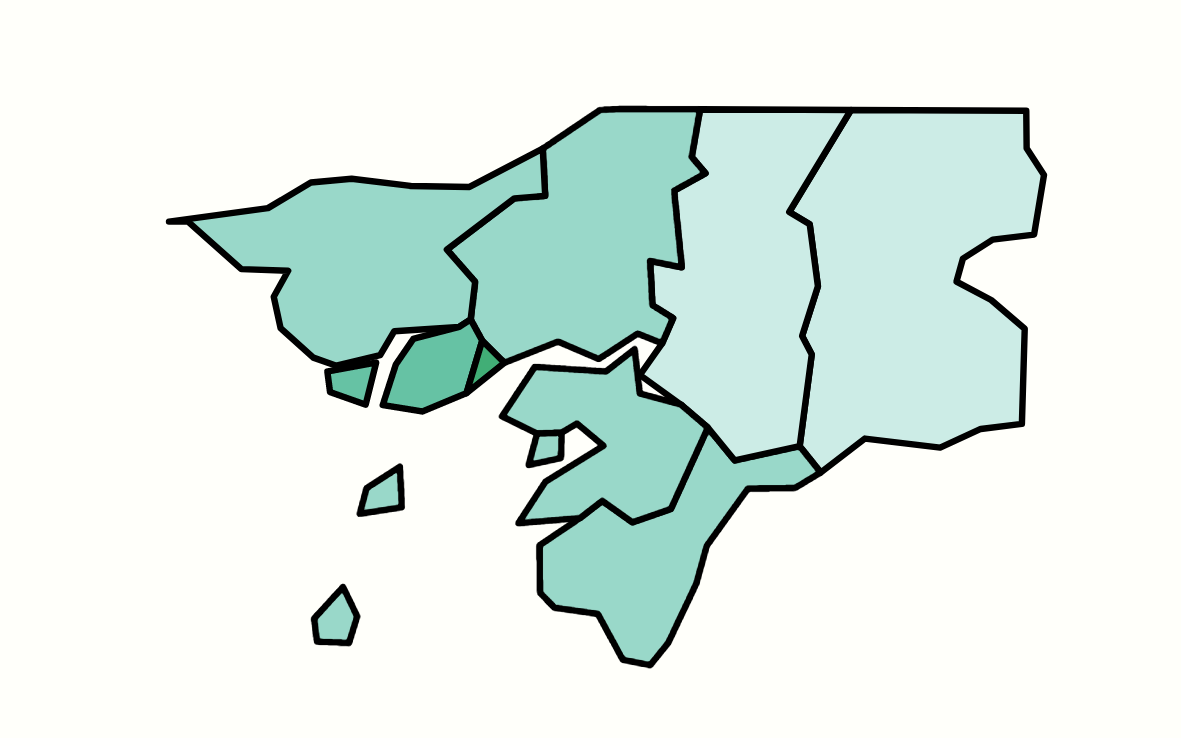
Map of Guinea-Bissau regions by HDI in 2019.500-.541.450-.499.400-.449.350-.299

Rank	Region	HDI (2023)
Medium human development
1	Bissau	0.612
Low human development
2	Cacheu	0.535
–	Guinea-Bissau (average)	0.514
3	Biombo	0.517
4	Bolama	0.507
5	Quinara	0.505
6	Tombali	0.498
7	Bafatá	0.490
8	Oio	0.461
9	Gabú	0.418

== See also ==
- List of countries by Human Development Index
