= Safim =

City and sector in the Biombo Region of Guinea-Bissau

Coordinates: 11°57′N 15°39′W

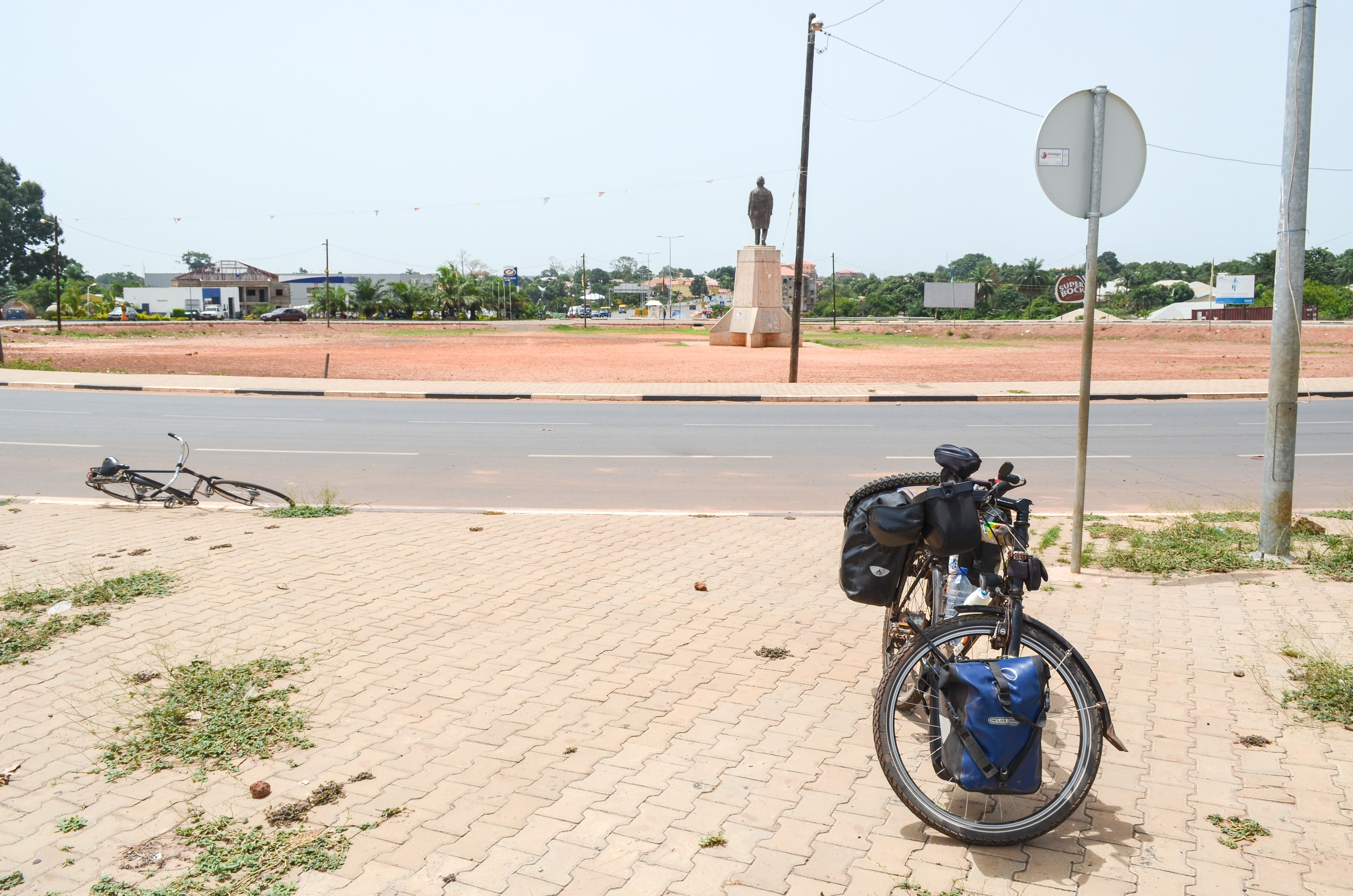
Roundabout in front of Osvaldo Vieira Airport, in the Bissalanca neighborhood, Safim city.

Safim is a city and sector in the Biombo Region of Guinea-Bissau. It has a population of 17,356 inhabitants as of the 2009 national census.

The sector's land area covers 174.8 km^{2}.

Safim is part of the Metropolitan Region of Bissau, a conurbation that includes the cities of Bissau, Prabis and Nhacra.

In this city, in the Bissalanca neighborhood, is the Osvaldo Vieira International Airport, the only international airport in the country.

Its name is a reference to the Safim River, which cuts through the sectorial territory.

== Natives ==
Natives include Rafael Paula Barbosa.
