= Human trafficking in Guinea-Bissau =

Guinea-Bissau ratified the 2000 UN TIP Protocol in September 2007.

== Background in 2010 ==
In 2010 Guinea-Bissau was a source country for children subjected to trafficking in persons, specifically forced labor, principally begging, and forced prostitution. Boys were sent to Senegal, and to a lesser extent Mali and Guinea, under the care of Koranic teachers called marabouts, or their intermediaries, to receive Islamic religious education. These teachers, however, routinely beat and subjected the children, called talibé, to force them to beg, and subjected them to other harsh treatment, sometimes separating them permanently from their families. UNICEF estimated that 200 children were taken from Guinea-Bissau each month for this purpose, and in 2008 a study found that 30 percent of the 8,000 religious students begging on the streets of Dakar were from Guinea-Bissau. Oftentimes, former talibés men from the regions of Bafata and Gabu, were the principal traffickers. In most cases, they operated in the open, protected by their stature in the Muslim community. Some observers believed girls were also targets and may have been subjected to domestic labor in Guinea-Bissau or Senegal.

The Government of Guinea-Bissau did not fully comply with the minimum standards for the elimination of trafficking; however, it made significant efforts to do so, despite limited resources. Despite these efforts, the government demonstrated weak overall progress in combating trafficking during the reporting period, particularly its lack of any effective law enforcement action; therefore, Guinea-Bissau was placed on the Tier 2 Watch List for the third consecutive year.

== International Response ==
The U.S. State Department's Office to Monitor and Combat Trafficking in Persons placed the country in "Tier 3" in 2017 and 2023.

In 2023, the Organised Crime Index noted the prevalence of the crime as well as new legislation.

== Prosecution (2010) ==
The Government of Guinea-Bissau did not increase efforts to prosecute and punish trafficking offenders during the reporting period. Bissau-Guinean law does not prohibit all forms of human trafficking, though it prohibits forced labor under article 37 of the country's penal code, which prescribes a sufficiently stringent penalty of life imprisonment. In the previous reporting period, the National Assembly drafted legislation prohibiting child trafficking, though it was not adopted before the legislature was dissolved in August 2008. Guinea-Bissau does not specifically prohibit forced prostitution. The government could use existing laws to punish trafficking cases, such as the laws against removing children, sexual exploitation, abuse, and kidnapping of children, but did not do so during the reporting period. The government neither investigated nor prosecuted human trafficking offenses during the reporting period, due largely to systemic failures that pervaded the judicial system, such as lack of institutional capacity and corruption.

== Protection (2010) ==
The Government of Guinea-Bissau continued to demonstrate efforts to protect and repatriate victims. However, the government did not demonstrate proactive efforts to identify trafficking victims. While the government did not operate victim shelters or provide other victims services directly, it continued to fund an NGO shelter for child trafficking victims in Gabu, providing about $16,000 to the annual operating budget of the facility. Police continued to refer victims to that NGO shelter, as well as a shelter operated by a separate NGO in Bafata. The government continued efforts, as allowed under Guinea- Bissau law, to intercept and return victims domestically and repatriate victims from abroad. The government, together with the Government of Senegal and the Bissau-Guinean Embassy in Dakar, repatriated 43 children during the reporting period. As part of the repatriation process for talibés, parents must sign a contract with the regional court accepting responsibility for the safety of their children, and can be subject to criminal sanction should the children be trafficked again. The government held some child victims in transition shelters until it could successfully reunite them with family and ensure that the family would not be involved in the child's re-trafficking. No special protections are afforded to witnesses. Police coordinated their repatriation efforts with NGOs, in the last year referring 160 victims to NGO providers of victim services. Victims were frequently too young to contribute meaningfully to any prosecution. However, the government encouraged family members of the victim to assist in any investigation or prosecution of trafficking offenders. Given the widespread cultural acceptance of sending young boys away from home for a religious education, family members often were reluctant to support law enforcement efforts against traffickers.

== Prevention (2010) ==
The Government of Guinea-Bissau continued to make minimal efforts to raise awareness about trafficking during the reporting period. A government-supported NGO trained border guards to identify potential trafficking offenders. Guards detained male adults who could not prove they were the fathers of children trying to cross the border and arranged for their transportation to police headquarters in Gabu. Border guards did not refer these cases to police for investigation, and suspected traffickers were generally released while guards contacted parents to collect their children. National anti-trafficking coordination efforts were hampered by the government's failure to implement new programs in 2009 or adopt a previously drafted national action plan. An inter-ministerial committee, chaired by the president of the Institute of Women and Children, met regularly in an effort to coordinate the government and civil society response to human trafficking, but undertook little action. The government did not take measures to reduce the demand for commercial sex acts or forced labor during the year. Guinea-Bissau is not a party to the 2000 UN TIP Protocol.
