= Bambadinca =

- Sector
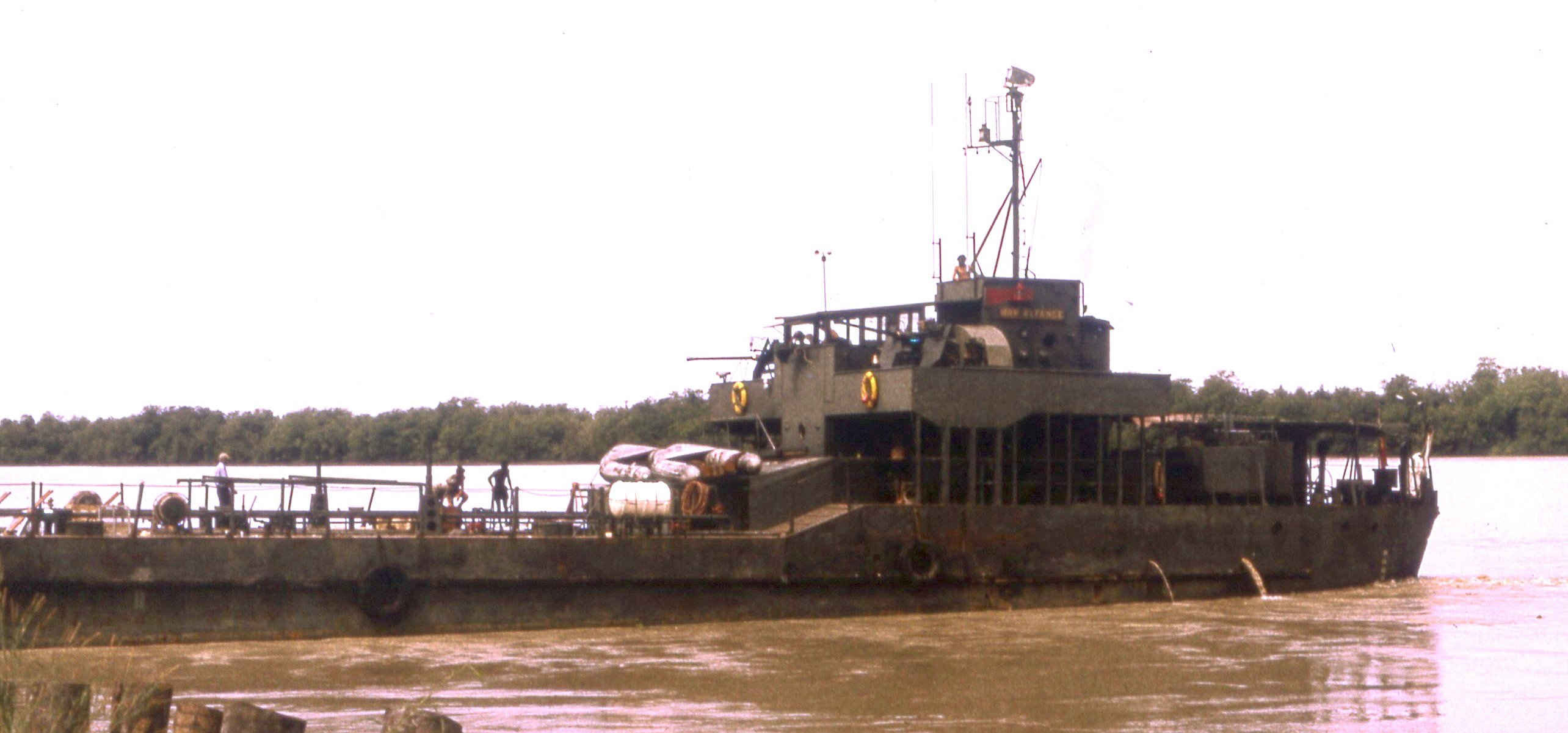
- The large landing craft NRP Alfange supplying the garrison of Bambadinca 1973. During the Portuguese Colonial War, the village was an important Portuguese base

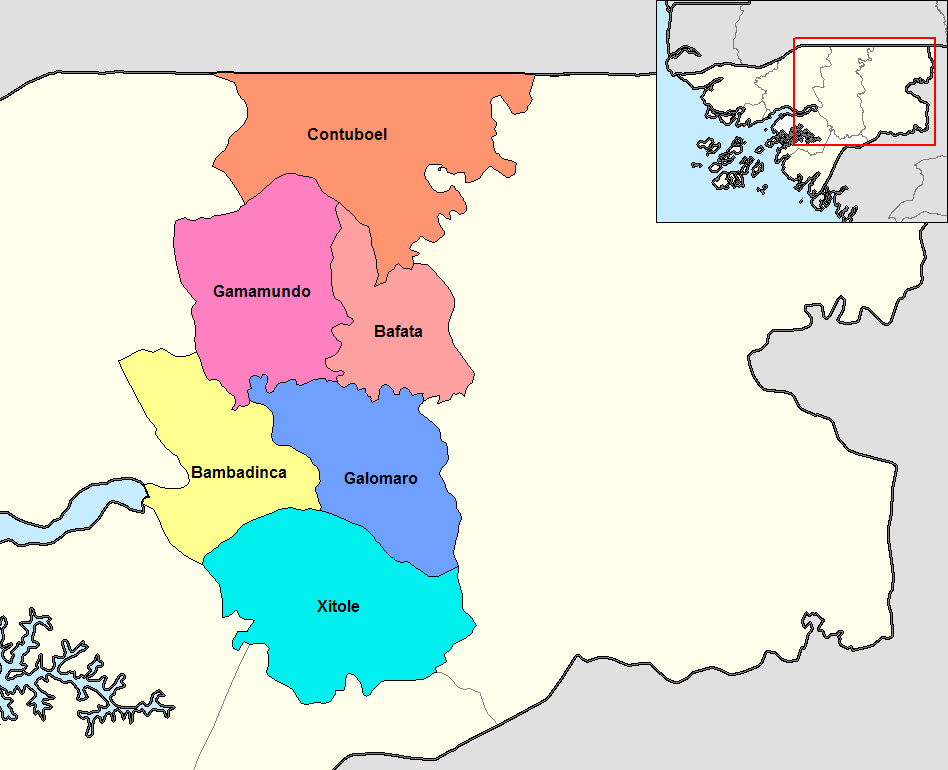
- Bambadinca in Bafatá Region (Yellow)

- Location of Bambadinca in Guinea-Bissau
- Coordinates: 12°02′N 14°52′W
- Country: Guinea-Bissau
- Region: Bafatá Region

Area
  - Total: 843.8 km^{2} (325.8 sq mi)

Population (2009)
  - Total: 32,255
  - Density: 38.23/km^{2} (99.00/sq mi)

Bambadinca is a village in one of seven sectors in the Bafatá Region of Guinea-Bissau, situated in some 59 kilometres (37 mi) east of Bissau, the country's capital city. In 2009 it had 33,255 inhabitants.

Bambadinca is the first developing county, in West Africa, with about 7,000 people with the village rural electrification through a microgrid, providing good quality, reliable and affordable electricity to the population, improving health conditions and supporting fundamental economic activities. To ensure economical and financial sustainability, a three-party participatory management model for the Decentralized System for Production and Distribution of Electricity from Renewable Energy, has been implemented by the community of a local association in cooperation with national authorities.

Bambadinca, with its 6500 inhabitants, was the first settlement of Guinea-Bissau to take advantage of renewable energy produced by a hybrid photovoltaic plant 24 hours a day. 312 kW of installed capacity and consisting of 1248 photovoltaic panels, renewable energy has changed the countryside of Bambadinca.

The central of the photovoltaic energy has 216 batteries to "keep" the solar energy converted into electricity and is hybrid because there are three diesel generators to ensure alternative sources of supply and distribution of energy at all times.
