= Bafata =

Bafata may refer to:

- Bafatá Region of Guinea-Bissau
  - Bafatá, city and seat of the Bafatá Region of Guinea-Bissau
- Bafata, Oio, Guinea-Bissau
