= Bedanda =

Coordinates: 11°21′N 15°07′W

Bedanda is a Sector in the Tombali Region of Guinea-Bissau.

== See also ==
- Jagidiss Bedanda
