= Gamamundo =

Coordinates: 12°16′N 14°44′W

Gamamundo is a sector in the Bafata Region of Guinea-Bissau.
