= Contuboel =

Coordinates: 12°22′N 14°34′W

Contuboel is a sector in the Bafata Region of Guinea-Bissau.
