= Galomaro =

Coordinates: 11.94733°N 14.64069°W

Galomaro is a sector in the Bafata Region of Guinea-Bissau.
