= Tito Júnior =

Bissau-Guinean footballer (born 1995)

Personal information
- Full name: Tito Cabral Júnior
- Date of birth: 28 July 1995 (age 31)
- Place of birth: Bissau, Guinea-Bissau
- Height: 1.75 m (5 ft 9 in)
- Position: Right-back

Team information
- Current team: Atlético CP
- Number: 45

Youth career
- 2008–2013: SL Cartaxo
- 2013–2014: Leiria

Senior career*
| Years | Team | Apps | (Gls) |
| 2014–2016 | Naval | 58 | (1) |
| 2016–2020 | Sertanense | 120 | (6) |
| 2020–2022 | Trofense | 35 | (0) |
| 2022–2023 | Varzim | 26 | (0) |
| 2023–2024 | Anadia | 16 | (0) |
| 2024– | Atlético CP | 19 | (0) |

International career^{‡}
| 2022– | Guinea-Bissau | 2 | (0) |
- * Club domestic league appearances and goals as of 25 June 2025 ‡ National team caps and goals as of 14:33, 16 October 2023 (UTC)

Tito Cabral Júnior (born 28 July 1995) is a Bissau-Guinean professional footballer who plays as a right-back for Portuguese Liga 3 club Atlético CP and the Guinea-Bissau national team.

== Club career ==
Tito Júnior is a youth product of Cartaxo and Leiria. He began his senior career with Naval, before moving to Sertanense. On 9 June 2020, he transferred to Trofense, helping them achieve promotion to the Liga Portugal 2 in 2022. He made his professional debut with Trofense in a 2–0 Liga Portugal 2 win over Benfica B on 28 January 2022.

== International career ==
Tito Júnior was first called up to the Guinea-Bissau national team for a set of friendlies in March 2022. He debuted with Guinea-Bissau in a friendly 3–0 win over Equatorial Guinea on 23 March 2022.
