= Komo, Guinea-Bissau =

Coordinates: 11°11′N 15°18′W

Komo is a sector in Tombali Region, Guinea-Bissau.

According to the 2009 census, its population was 8,777.

In 1973, Komo was an early site of fighting during the Guinea-Bissau War of Independence.
