= East, Guinea-Bissau =

East
- Province
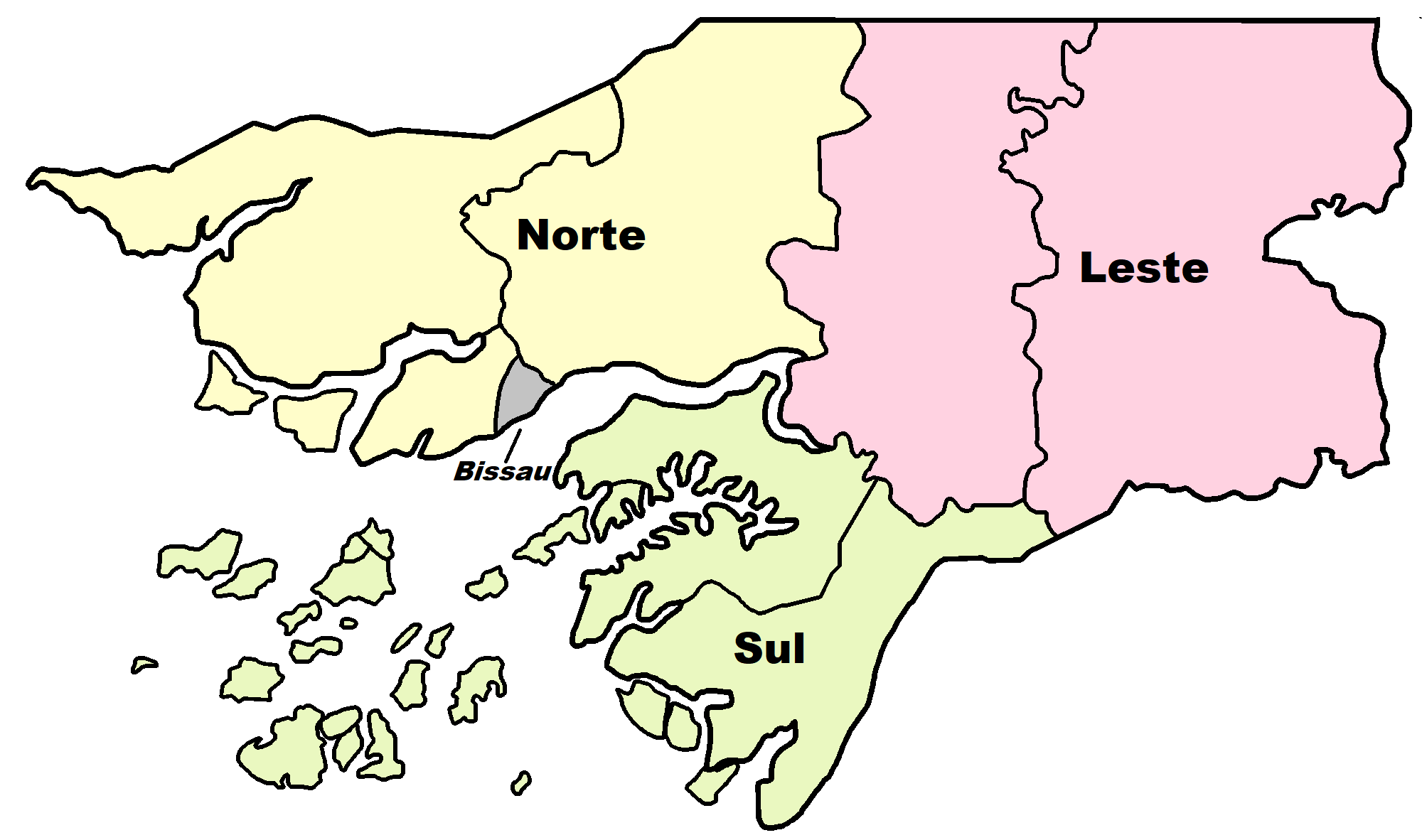

- Location within Guinea-Bissau
- Coordinates: 12.17°N 14.37°W
- Country: Guinea-Bissau

East is a province in Guinea-Bissau. It consists of Bafatá and Gabu regions.
