= North, Guinea-Bissau =

North
- Province
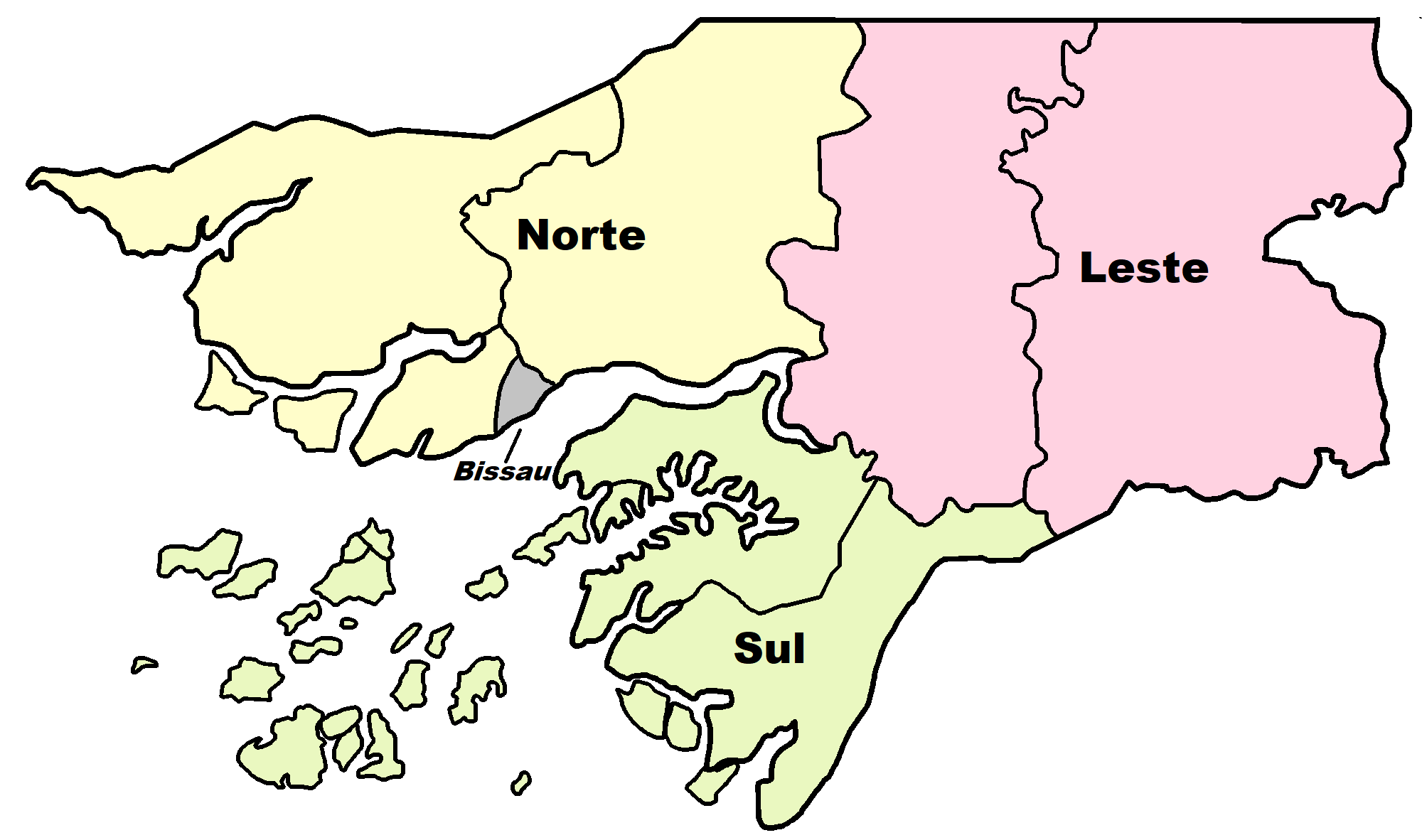

- Location within Guinea-Bissau
- Country: Guinea-Bissau

North is a province in Guinea-Bissau. It consists Biombo, Cacheu and Oio regions.
