= South, Guinea-Bissau =

South
- Province
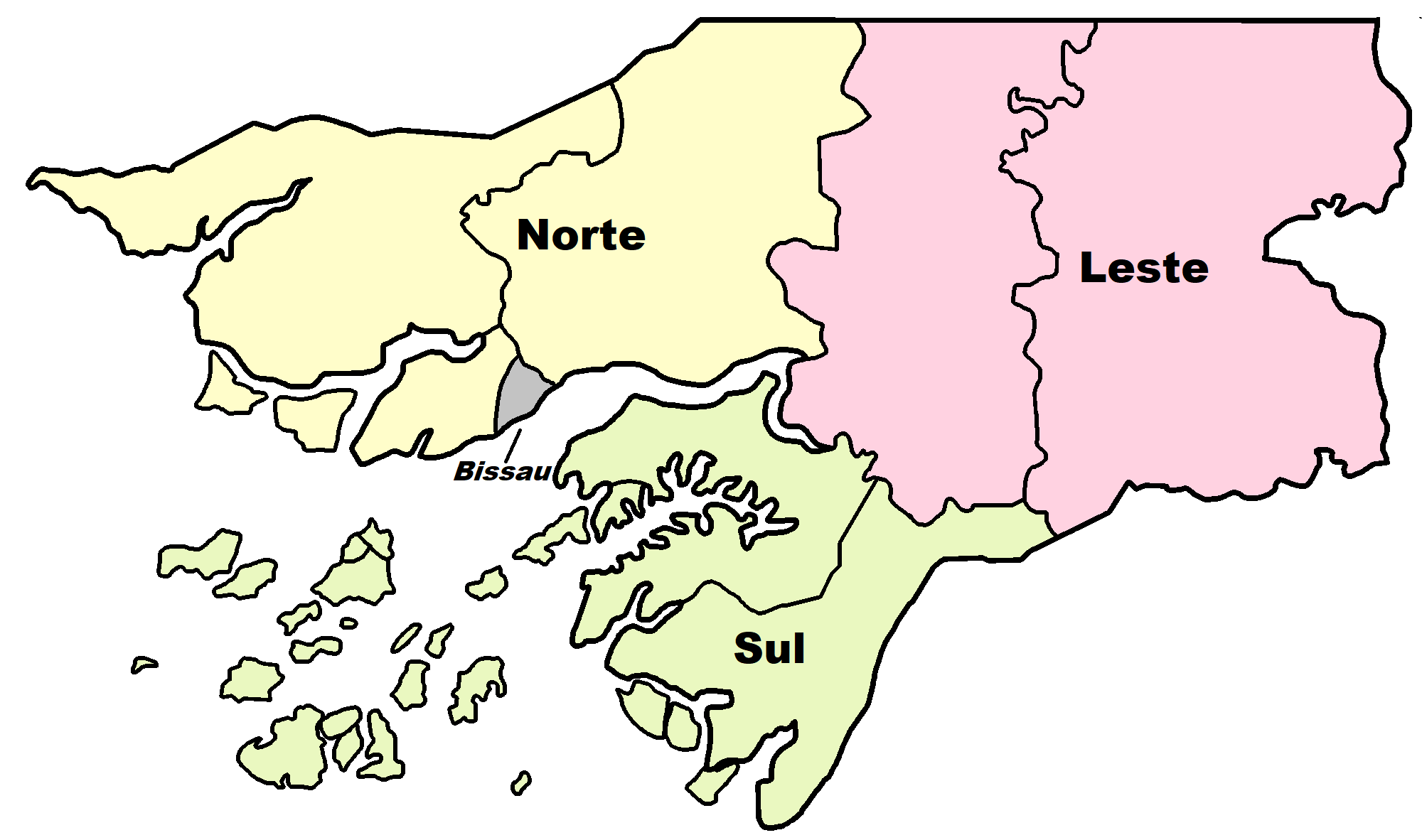

- Location within Guinea-Bissau
- Country: Guinea-Bissau

South is a province in Guinea-Bissau. It consists Bolama, Quinara and Tombali regions.
