= Jagudis de Biombo =

- Full name: Jagudis de Biombo
- Ground: Arena de Biombo; Biombo, Guinea-Bissau
- Capacity: 5,000
- League: Campeonato Assotiation da Guine-Bissau

Jagudis de Biombo is a Guinea-Bissauan football club based in Biombo. They play in the 2 division in Guinean football, the Campeonato Nacional da Guine-Bissau, under the Football Federation of Guinea-Bissau (FFGB).
