= Catió =

- Location in Guinea-Bissau
- Coordinates: 11°17′0″N 15°15′0″W
- Country: Guinea-Bissau
- Region: Tombali Region
- Elevation: 1 m (3.3 ft)

Population (2008 est.)
  - Total: 9,217

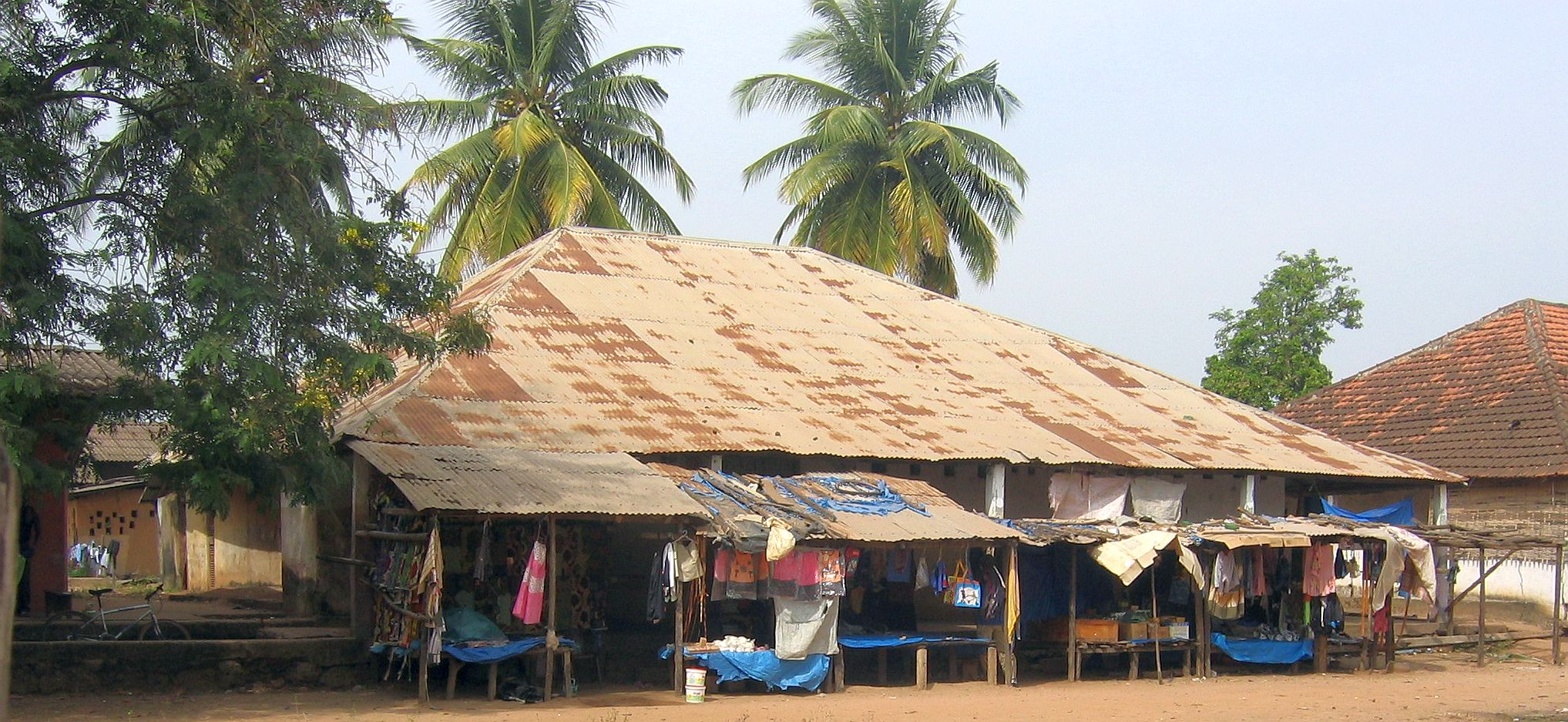
Market, Catió

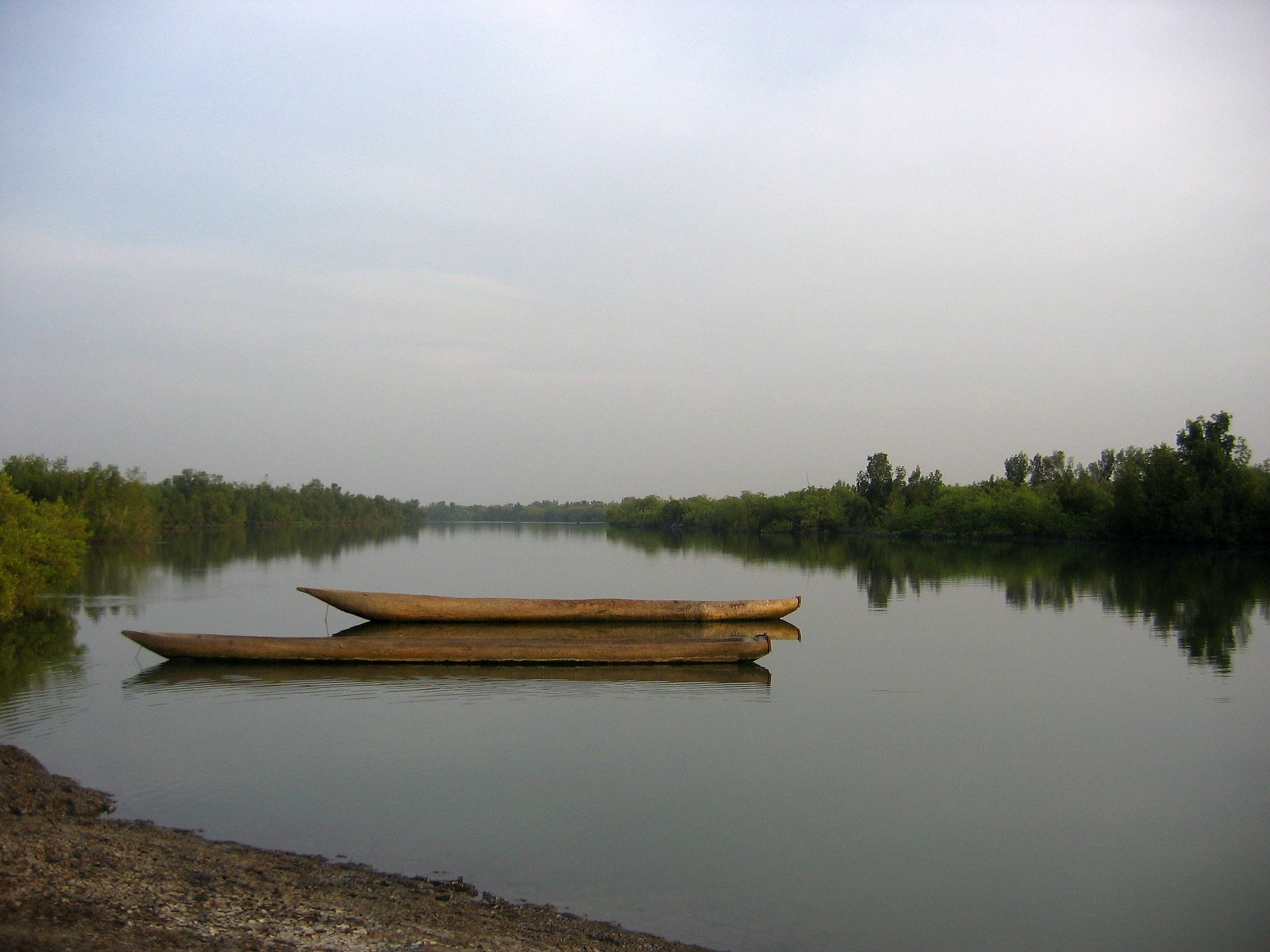
Cumbija river near Catió

Catió is a city in south-western Guinea-Bissau. It is the capital of Tombali Region.

Population 9,217 (2008 est).

Catio, along with Canjadude and other camps were besieged by the Portuguese in 1973.

== Notable people ==
- Abdulai Silá (1958-) -engineer and writer
- Mamadi Camará (2003-) - Footballer for Reading F.C.

== Climate ==
Catió has a tropical monsoon climate (Köppen Am) featuring hot temperatures year-round, little to no rainfall from November to May and heavy to extremely heavy rainfall from June to October.

Climate data for Catió
Month	Jan	Feb	Mar	Apr	May	Jun	Jul	Aug	Sep	Oct	Nov	Dec	Year
Mean daily maximum °C (°F)	31.3 (88.3)	32.4 (90.3)	33.2 (91.8)	33.6 (92.5)	33.0 (91.4)	31.1 (88.0)	29.0 (84.2)	28.2 (82.8)	29.7 (85.5)	30.9 (87.6)	31.5 (88.7)	30.5 (86.9)	31.2 (88.2)
Daily mean °C (°F)	25.4 (77.7)	26.1 (79.0)	27.2 (81.0)	27.9 (82.2)	27.9 (82.2)	26.8 (80.2)	25.8 (78.4)	25.4 (77.7)	26.3 (79.3)	26.9 (80.4)	27.3 (81.1)	25.4 (77.7)	26.5 (79.7)
Mean daily minimum °C (°F)	19.5 (67.1)	19.9 (67.8)	21.2 (70.2)	22.2 (72.0)	22.9 (73.2)	22.6 (72.7)	22.7 (72.9)	22.6 (72.7)	23.0 (73.4)	22.9 (73.2)	23.1 (73.6)	20.4 (68.7)	21.9 (71.5)
Average rainfall mm (inches)	0 (0)	1 (0.0)	0 (0)	1 (0.0)	38 (1.5)	252 (9.9)	632 (24.9)	798 (31.4)	460 (18.1)	267 (10.5)	57 (2.2)	5 (0.2)	2,511 (98.7)
Source: Climate-Data.org
