= Prabis =

Sector in the Biombo region of Guinea-Bissau

Coordinates: 11°48′07″N 15°44′19″W

Prábis is a city and an administrative sector in the Biombo Region of Guinea-Bissau. In 2004, it had a population of 12,312.

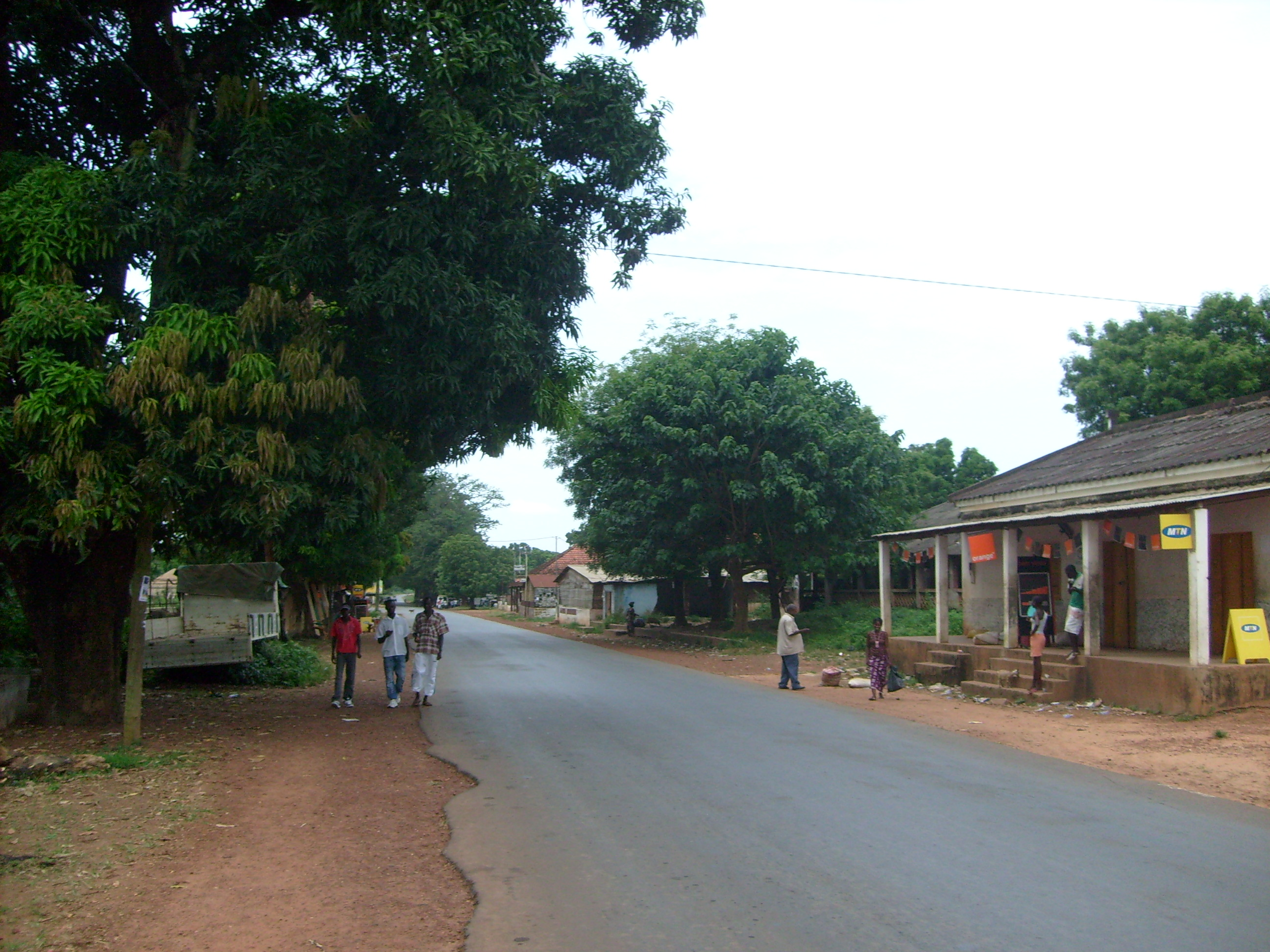
Street view of Prábis town
