= Quinhamel =

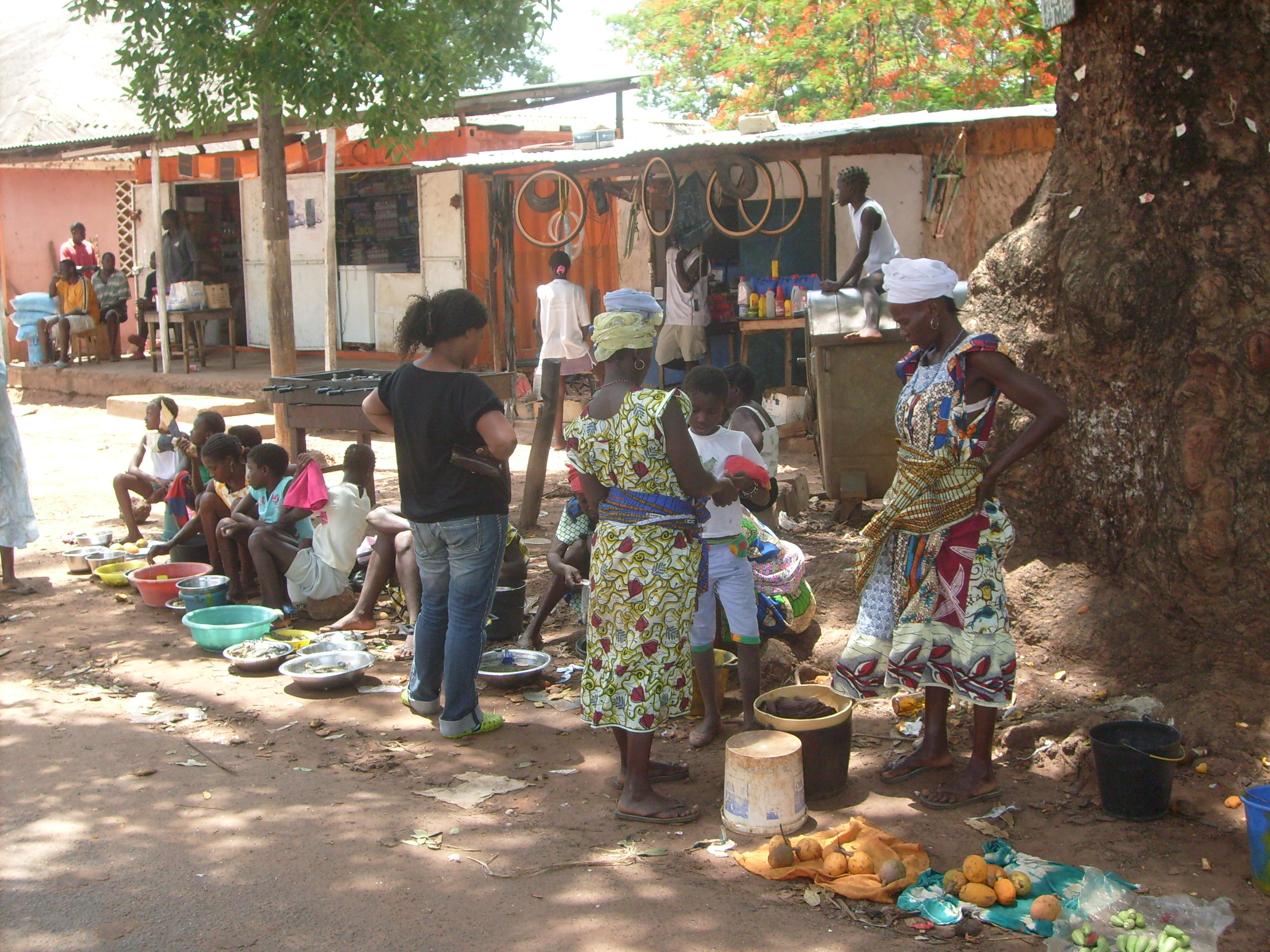
- Main street of Quinhamel

- Location in Guinea-Bissau
- Coordinates: 11°53′N 15°51′W
- Country: Guinea-Bissau
- Region: Biombo Region
- Elevation: 0 m (0 ft)

Population (2008 est.)
  - Total: 2,887

Quinhamel is a city in Guinea-Bissau and the capital of the Biombo Region. It has a population of 2,887 (2008 est).

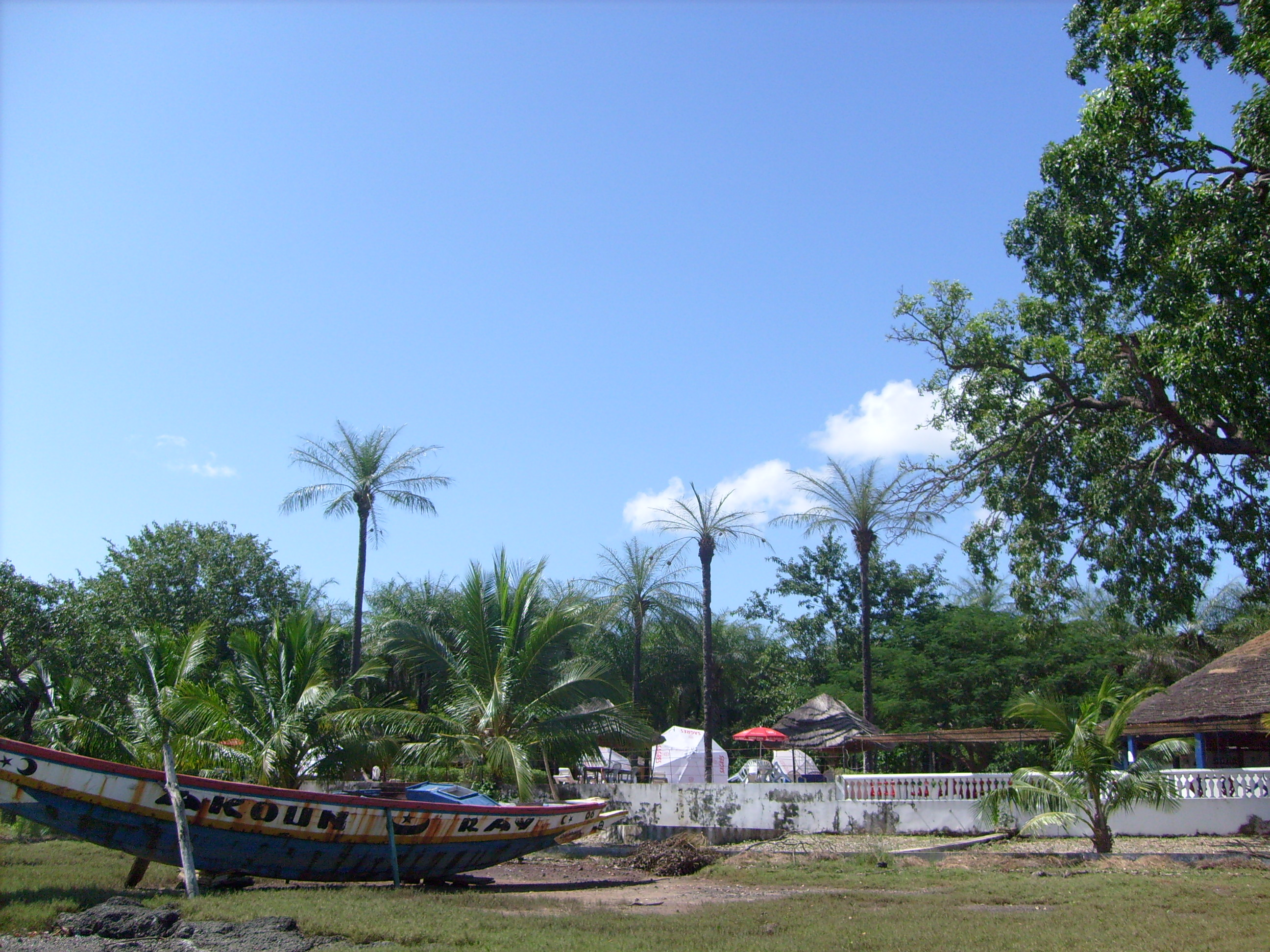
Coastal area at Hotel Mar Azul, serving as port for private boats
