= Regions of Guinea-Bissau =

Guinea-Bissau is divided into 8 regions (singular: região, plural: regiões) and 1 autonomous sector (sector autónomo). The regions are subdivided into a total of 39 sectors (singular: setor, plural: setores); which are further subdivided into smaller groups called sections (singular: secção, plural: secções); which are further subdivided into populated places (i.e.: towns, villages, localities, settlements, communities, etc.).

== Regions ==
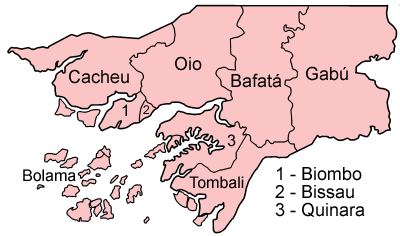
A clickable map of Guinea-Bissau exhibiting its eight regions and one autonomous sector.

Region	Capital	Area		Population (2009)	Pv	#S
Region	Capital	km^{2}	mi^{2}	Population (2009)	Pv	#S
Bafatá	Bafatá	5,981.1	2,309.3	210,007	E	6
Biombo	Quinhámel	838.8	323.9	97,120	N	3
Bissau		77.5	29.9	387,909	—	1
Bolama	Bolama	2,624.4	1,013.3	34,563	S	4
Cacheu	Cacheu	5,174.9	1,998.0	192,508	N	6
Gabú	Gabú	9,150.0	3,532.8	215,530	E	5
Oio	Farim	5,403.4	2,086.3	224,644	N	5
Quinara	Buba	3,138.4	1,211.7	63,610	S	4
Tombali	Catió	3,376.5	1,303.7	94,939	S	5

The regions can also be grouped into 3 provinces:

- Leste (East): Bafatá, Gabu
- Norte (North): Biombo, Cacheu, Oio
- Sul (South): Bolama, Quinara, Tombali

== See also ==
- List of regions of Guinea-Bissau by Human Development Index
- ISO 3166-2:GW
