= Xitole =

Coordinates: 11°44′N 14°49′W

Xitole is a sector in the Bafata Region of Guinea-Bissau. It covers an area of 1,218.6 square kilometres, and with a population of 19,424.
