= Tombali region =

Region of Guinea-Bissau

Coordinates: 11°15′N 15°0′W

Tombali
- Region
- Tombali region
- Country: Guinea-Bissau
- Seat: Catió
- Sectors: Bedanda, Cacine, Catió, Quebo, Komo

Area
  - Total: 3,736.5 km^{2} (1,442.7 sq mi)

Population (2009 census)
  - Total: 94,939
  - Density: 25.409/km^{2} (65.808/sq mi)
- ISO 3166 code: GW-TO

Tombali is one of the eight regions of Guinea-Bissau. It is located in the extreme south of the country and its capital is Catió. There has not been any local administration since the 1998-99 Guinea-Bissau Civil War and all social services are done by organs of civil society and other government agencies. It is a coastal region covered with mangrove swamps, rain forest and tangled forest and receives an annual rainfall of more than 2,000 millimetres or 79 inches.

As of 2009, the total population of the region was 91,089, with the urban population being 12,967 and rural being 78,122. The sex ratio of the region is 94 females for every hundred males. As of 2009, the net activity rate was 54.77 per cent, proportion of employed labour force was 37.86 per cent, proportion of labour force was 75.74 and the proportion of potentially active population was 37.86 per cent, with the major economic activity being fishing. The absolute poverty rate, people earning less than $2 a day, in the region stood at 69.1 per cent, with a regional contribution of 11.2 per cent to the national poverty totals.

== Geography ==
Tombali is a low-lying coastal region and the low-lying coastal areas are periodically submerged during high tide. All the coastal regions have a maximum elevation of 300 m (980 ft). The internal region has plains, which are interspersed with rias. There are many meandering rivers, of which a substantial proportion form estuaries in the coastal regions. The principal river, Cacheu, flows through the region. The climate is tropical savanna (Köppen Aw) north of Catió and tropical monsoon (Köppen Am) south of Catió. Like all of Guinea-Bissau there are two seasons: a dry season from November to May with dusty harmattan winds and typical temperature ranges from 20 °C (68 °F) to 30 °C (86 °F), and a monsoon wet season from May to November with temperatures consistently around 28 °C (82 °F) and heavy thunderstorm rains every day. The region receives an average rainfall of around 2,250 millimetres or 90 inches compared to inland Guinea-Bissau, which receive 1,500 millimetres or 60 inches. The coastal regions are covered with Mangrove swamps, rain forest and tangled forest.

== Administration ==
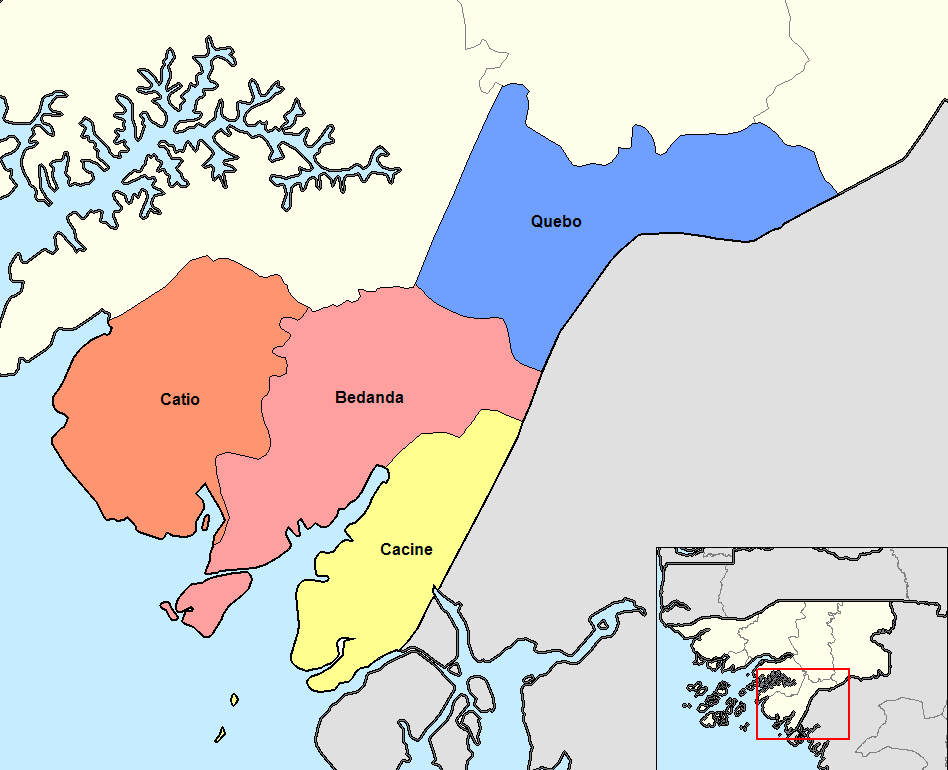
Sectors of Tombali

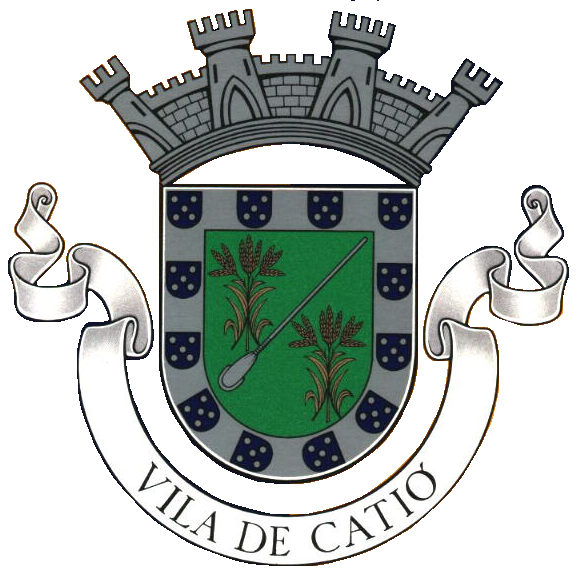
Coat of Arms during Portuguese Rule

Tombali is divided into five sectors namely Bedanda, Cacine, Catio, Quebo and Komo. Guinea-Bissau got independence from Portugal on 24 September 1973 after wars and diplomatic political actions under the African Party for the Independence of Guinea and Cape Verde (PAIGC), while Portugal accepted the independence of Cape Verde on 5 July 1975. PAIGC ruled both countries after independence. While international funds came pouring in for the economic development of the nation, the party was accused of misusing power in authoritarian manner. The one-party state mechanism was turbulent during the period of 1980s and 1990s with army taking control of power more frequently and the resultant civil war resulted in loss of property and lives. To decentralize power, an administrative region and eight regions were created. There has not been any local administration since the civil war of 1998-99 and all the social services are done by organs of civil society and other government agencies. There is minimal health and education services offered by the government and all the government departments have operated in a limited fashion. A transitional government was selected during 2003–4 with an adopted Public Transition Charter. The Military Committee appointed two civilians as interim President and Prime Minister. Elections were held for a five-year term on 24 July 2005 with a multi party representation. There was a military coup in 2012, after which EU and international donations stopped. The latest elections were held during April 2014 with 13 Presidential candidates and representation from 15 parties. The elections were monitored by 550 international observers. Jose Mario Vaz and his party, won the Presidential and parliamentary elections against the military backed Nuno Gomes Nabiam.

== Demographics ==
Historical population
Year	Pop.	±%
2005	86,348	—
2006	87,518	+1.4%
2007	88,697	+1.3%
2008	89,888	+1.3%
2009	91,089	+1.3%
2010	92,300	+1.3%
2011	93,521	+1.3%
2012	94,752	+1.3%

As of 2009, the total population of the region was 91,089, with the urban population being 12,967 and rural being 78,122. The sex ratio of the region is 94 females for every hundred males. The total resident population in the region is 91,089. The total agricultural population in the region is 41,746. The average number of households in the region is 8.1 and the density of the population is 24.4 km^{2}. The intercensal rate of average annual growth (adjusted data) is 1.61 per cent. The non-agricultural population in the country is 49,343. The total number of households per capita in the region is 11,272. The fraction of Christians in the region is 14.7 per cent, Muslims is 43.00 per cent, animists is 24.10 per cent, not detailed was 17.80 per cent and people following no religion was 0.4 per cent.

Faith	Percentage
Christian	14.7%
Muslim	43.0%
Animist	24.1%
Not Detailed	17.8%
No Religion	0.4%

== Economy ==
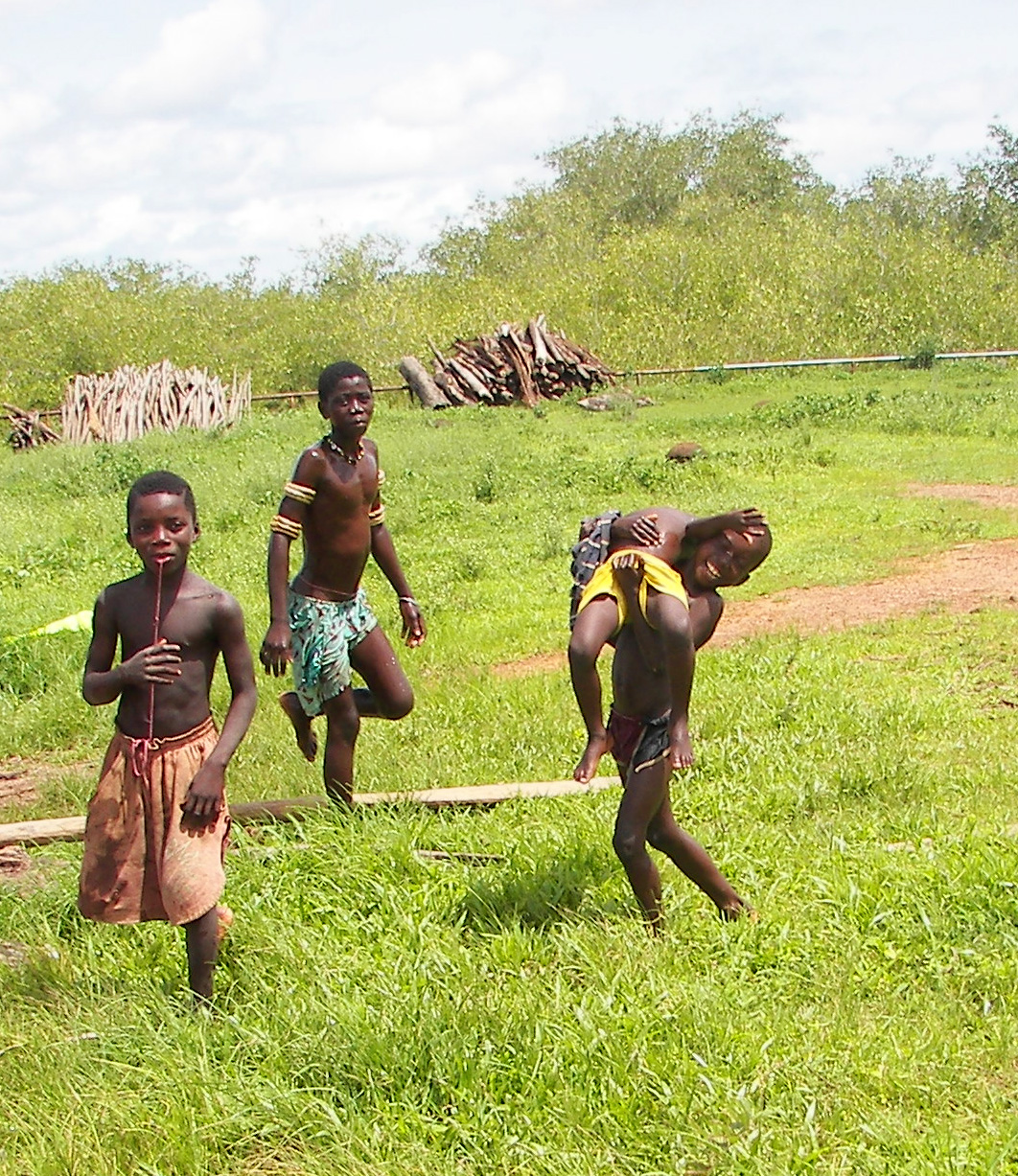
Boys from Catio

As of 2009, the net activity rate was 54.77 per cent, proportion of employed labour force was 37.86 per cent, proportion of labour force was 75.74 and the proportion of potentially active population was 37.86 per cent. The major economic activity in the parts around the rivers and the coastal areas was fishing, while it was agriculture in the inland areas. As of 2011, the total population which was active constitutes 60 per cent nationwide indicating there are lot of employed people. But the poverty rate was very high in the country with an estimated two-thirds below the poverty line. Out of the working population, an estimated 58.4 per cent are employed in freelance activities, while wage earners formed 42 per cent. The unemployment in the region as of 2001 was 10.2 per cent, compared to the capital Bissau which has 19.3 per cent. Totally 63.5 per cent were employed in agriculture (including forestry), 8.9 in industry and 6.1 per cent in public administration. As per IMF report in 2011, people who were engaged in agriculture were poorer compared to others, while educated and higher educated people earned more. The absolute poverty rate, people earning less than $2 a day, in the region stood at 69.1 per cent, with a regional contribution of 11.2 per cent to the national poverty totals.

== See also ==
- Regions of Guinea-Bissau
- Sectors of Guinea-Bissau
