= Sectors of Guinea-Bissau =

Administrative divisions of Guinea-Bissau

Guinea-Bissau is divided into 39 sectors (singular: setor, plural: setores), which subdivide the regions. The sectors are further subdivided into smaller groups called sections (singular: secção, plural: secções); which are further subdivided into populated places (i.e.: towns, villages, localities, settlements, communities, etc.). Here are the following listed below, by region:

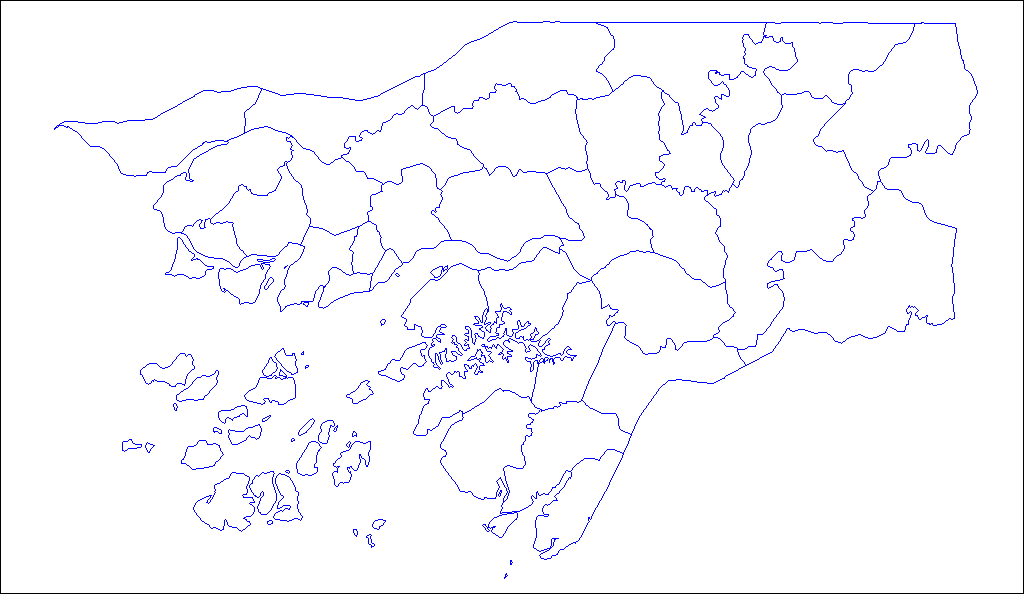
Sectors of Guinea-Bissau

== Eastern Guinea-Bissau ==
=== Bafata region ===
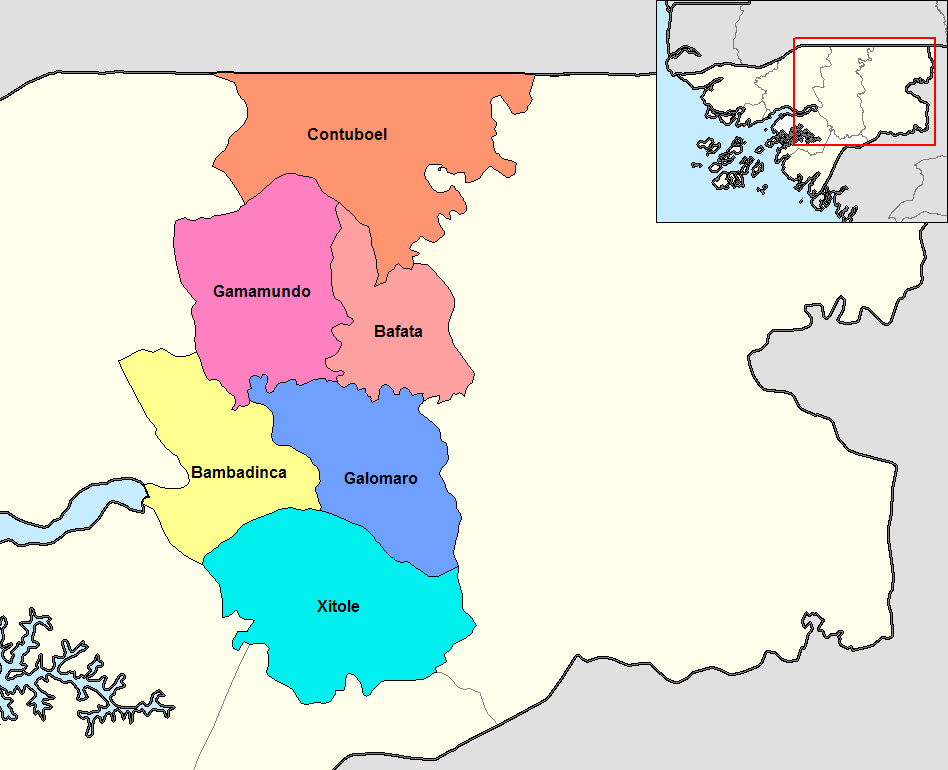
Sectors of Bafata

- Bafata
- Bambadinca
- Contuboel
- Galomaro
- Gamamundo
- Xitole

=== Gabú region ===
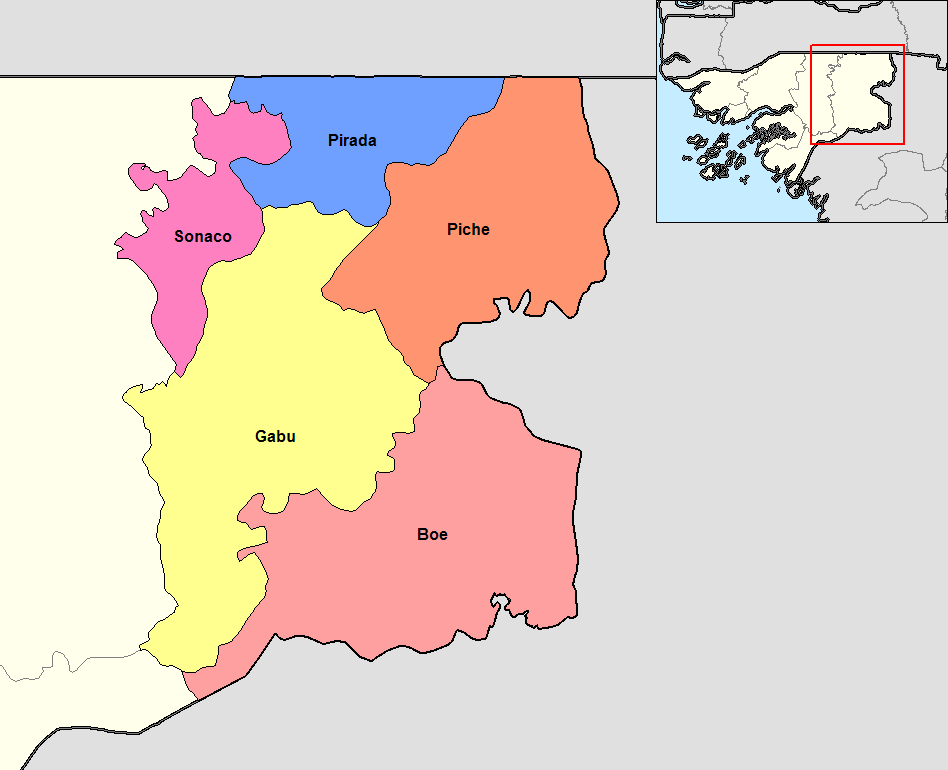
Sectors of Gabu

- Boe
- Gabú
- Piche
- Pirada
- Sonaco

== Northern Guinea-Bissau ==
=== Biombo region ===
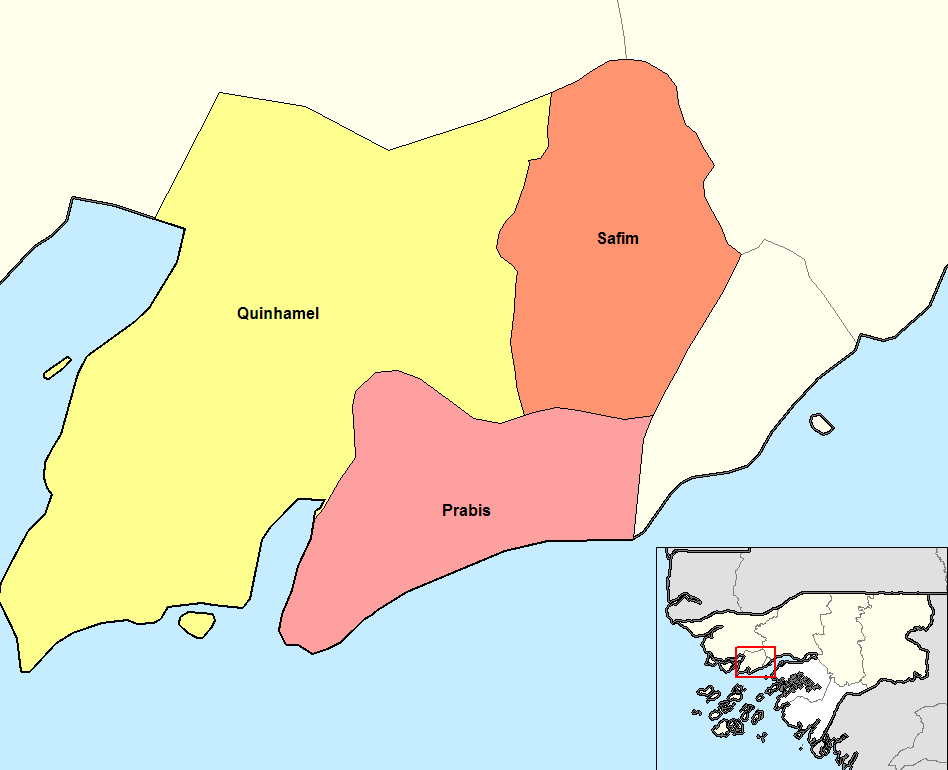
Sectors of Biombo

- Prabis
- Quinhamel
- Safim

=== Cacheu region ===
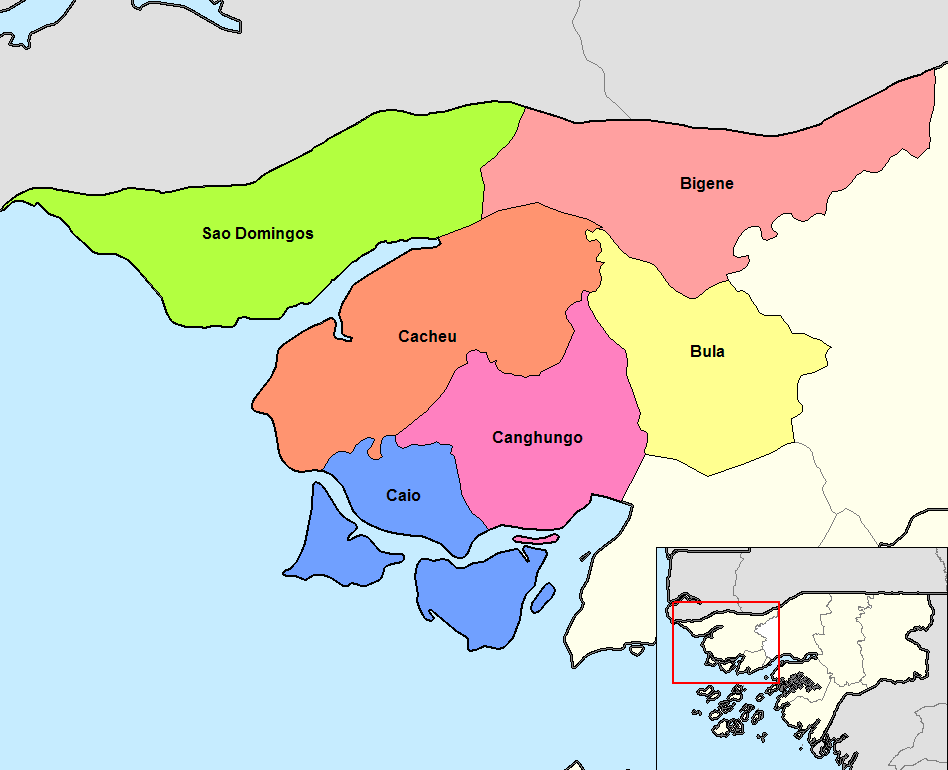
Sectors of Cacheu

- Bigene
- Bula
- Cacheu
- Caio
- Canghungo
- São Domingos

=== Oio region ===
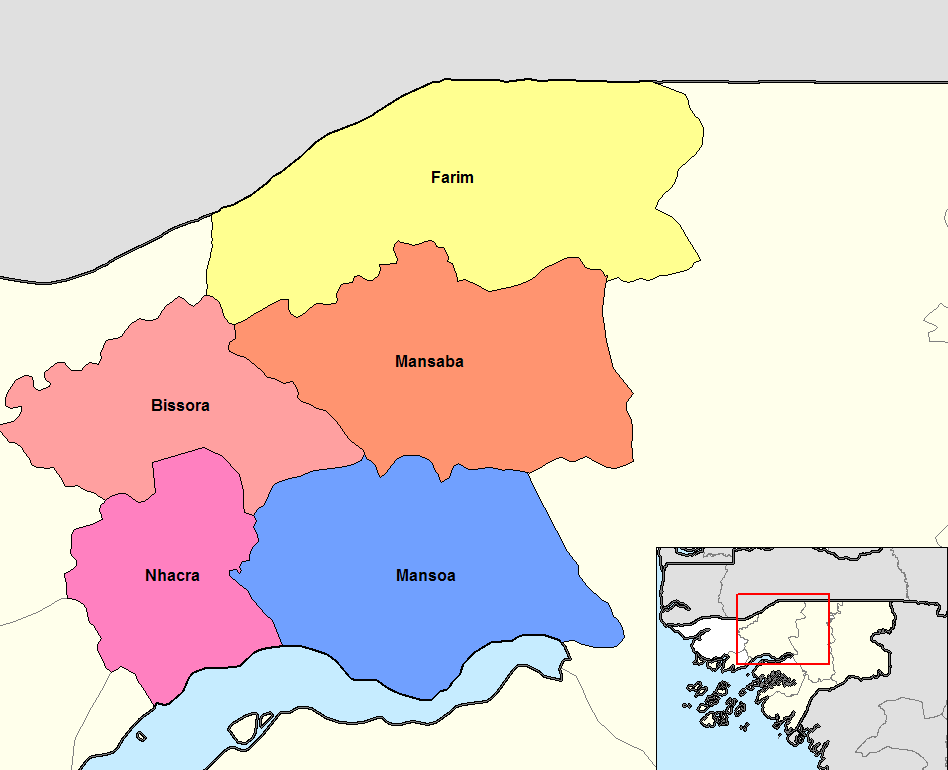
Sectors of Oio

- Bissorã
- Farim
- Mansaba
- Mansôa
- Nhacra

=== Bissau region ===
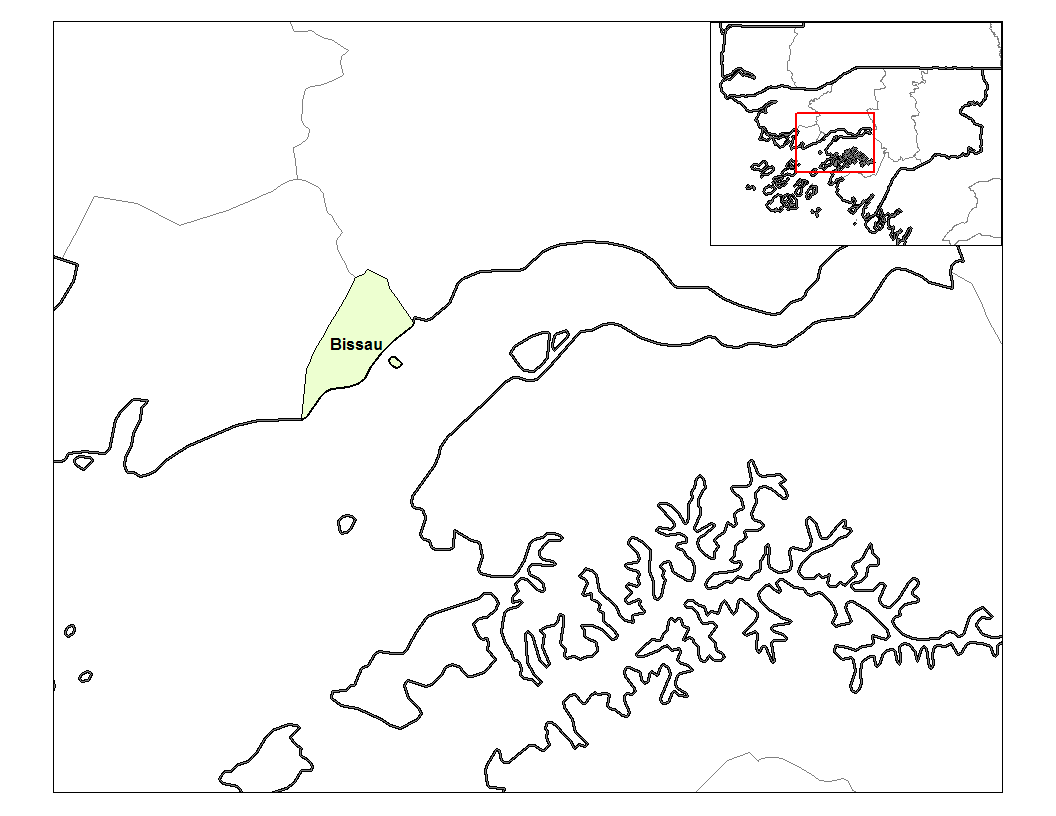
Bissau sector

- Bissau (autonomous sector)

== Southern Guinea-Bissau ==
=== Bolama region ===
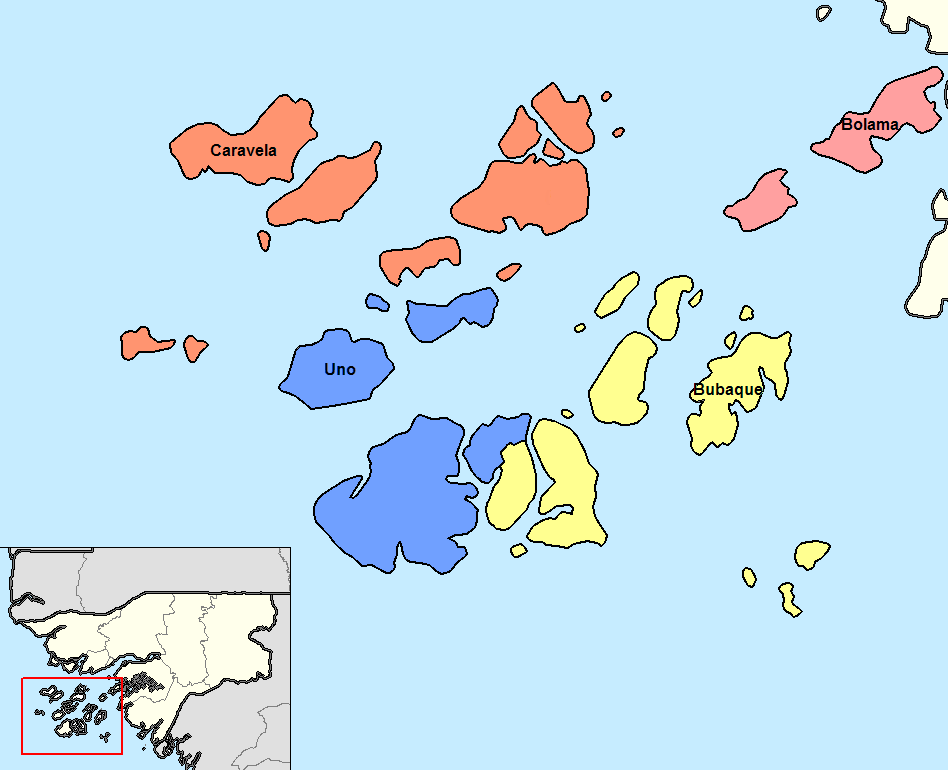
Sectors of Bolama

- Bolama
- Bubaque
- Caravela
- Uno

=== Quinara region ===
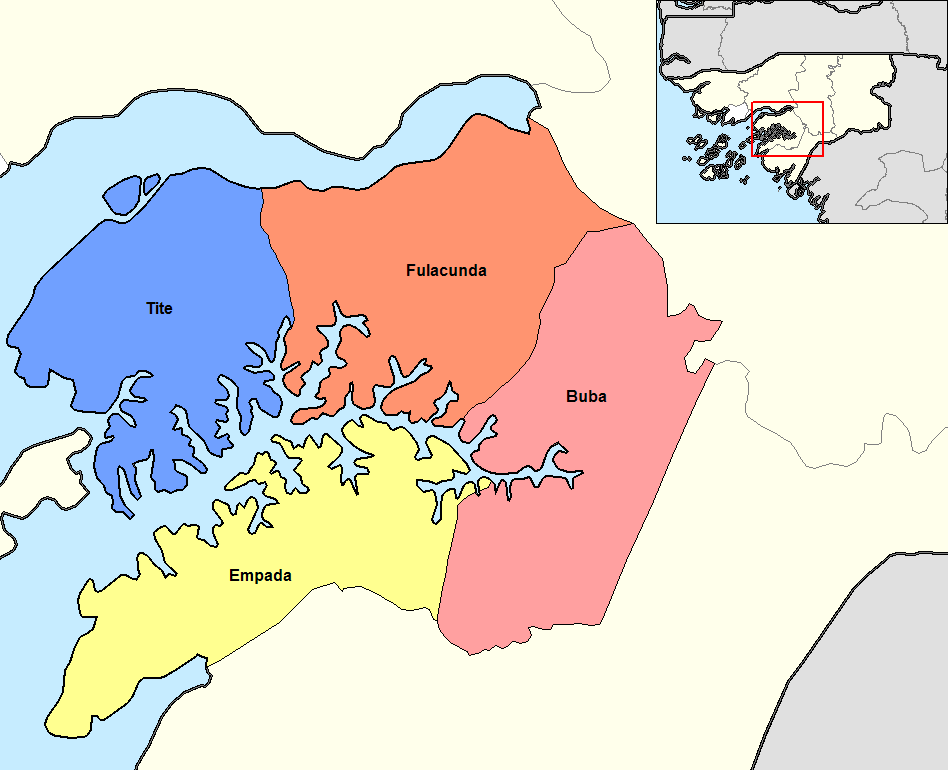
Sectors of Quinara

- Buba
- Empada
- Fulacunda
- Tite

=== Tombali region ===
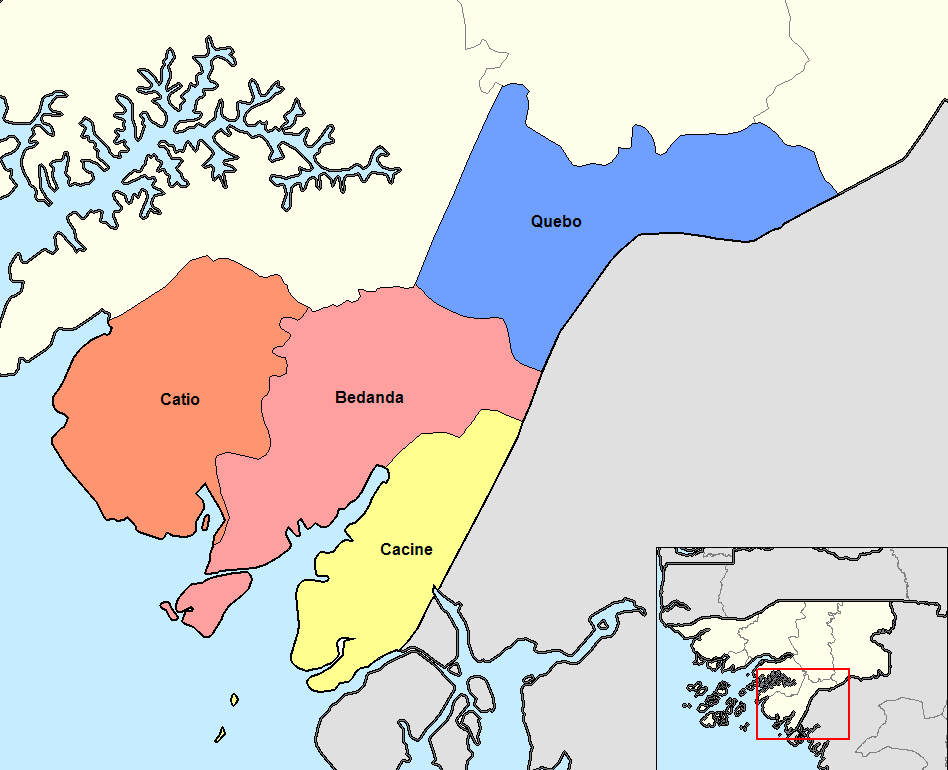
Sectors of Tombali

- Bedanda
- Cacine
- Catió
- Quebo
- Komo
