= List of islands of Guinea-Bissau =

This is a list of islands of Guinea-Bissau.

== Bissagos Islands ==
- Bubaque
- Bolama
- Carache
- Caravela
- Enu
- Formosa
- Galinhas
- João Vieira
- Maio
- Meneque
- Orango
- Orangozinho
- Poilão
- Ponta
- Roxa
- Rubane
- Soga
- Unhacomo
- Uno
- Uracane

== Other islands ==
- Elia Island
- Jeta
- Lisboa Island
- Melo Island
- Mosquitos Island
- Ocurri Island (Mantambua)
- Ongueringao Island
- Pecixe
- Seco Island

== See also ==
- Geography of Guinea-Bissau
