= Lisboa (disambiguation) =

Lisboa (Portuguese for "Lisbon") is the capital city of Portugal.

Lisboa may also refer to:

== Places ==
=== Portugal ===
- Distrito de Lisboa (Portuguese for Lisbon District)
- Lisboa Region (Portuguese for Lisbon Region)

=== Other ===
- Lisboa Island (Antarctica)
- Lisboa Island (Guinea-Bissau)

== Other uses ==
- Lisboa (surname), a Portuguese surname
- Emissores Associados de Lisboa, a defunct Portuguese radio station
- Casino Lisboa (disambiguation)
