= List of protected areas in Guinea-Bissau =

The protected areas of Guinea-Bissau include national parks, natural parks, faunal reserves, forest reserves, natural monuments, and marine protected areas.

== National parks ==
- Boé National Park
- Cantanhez Forest National Park
- Cufada National Park
- Dulombi National Park
- Orango National Park
- Varela National Park

== Marine national parks ==
- João Vieira and Poilão Marine National Park

== Biosphere reserves ==
- Bijagos Archipelago

== Natural parks ==
- Rio Cacheu Mangroves Natural Park
- Lagoas de Cufada Natural Park

== Faunal reserves ==
- Pelundo Faunal Reserve
- Canjambari Faunal Reserve

== Forest reserves ==
- Dungal Forest Reserve
- Sumbundo Forest Reserve
- Canquelifa Forest Reserve
- Mansoa Forest Reserve
- Salifo Forest Reserve

== Natural monuments ==
- Cusselinta Rapids
- Rochas de Nhampassare
- Muralha de Canjadude
- Gruta sagrada de Cabuca
- Fonte de agua quente de Cofra

== Protected areas ==
- Rio Grande de Buba

== Marine community protected areas ==
- Ilhas Formosa, Nago & Tchediã
