= Poilão =

- Location in Guinea-Bissau

Geography
- Location: Atlantic Ocean
- Coordinates: 10°51′53″N 15°43′36″W
- Archipelago: Bijagós Islands
- Area: 0.43 km^{2} (0.17 sq mi)

Administration
- Guinea-Bissau
- Region: Bolama Region
- Sector: Bubaque

Demographics
- Population: 0

Poilão is a small uninhabited island in the Bijagós Archipelago of Guinea-Bissau. It contains the country's southernmost point, at 10°51'53"N,15°43'36"W. It is part of the João Vieira and Poilão Marine National Park. The island is heavily forested. The nearest islands are Meio, 7 nmi (13 km) to the north, Cavalos, 9 nmi (17 km) to the north and João Vieira, 11 nmi (20 km) to the north-northeast. Its area is 43 ha. Between ca. 7000 and 29,000 green sea turtle (Chelonia mydas) nests are laid per year at the globally important site of Poilão Island. There is a lighthouse on the island, with focal height 27 m (89 ft).

== Cultural importance ==
While it is uninhabited, the island of Poilão is a sacred site for the people of the Bijagós Archipelago, and is traditionally owned by the community of the island of Roxa. The fact that it is considered sacred by the indigenous people meant that Poilão was not used as a place to hunt or gather resources. Men do not generally land on the island, with exceptions being allowed for traditional ceremonies. However, researchers carrying out a turtle survey on the island in 2000 found evidence of temporary shelters, including turtle remains, on the island. These are thought to be from non-local fishermen, who have sometimes been observed off-shore. As the ceremonies being held on the island are coming of age ceremonies for men, young women have traditionally been prohibited from the island.

The island is part of the João Vieira and Poilão Marine National Park, which was established in 2000. The archipelago as a whole is considered a biosphere reserve. The island is now regularly monitored by park rangers. Local communities are involved in the management and decision making of the park, and many staff are local. Upon request, these communities are allowed to use land or hunt turtles for traditional ceremonies. During negotiations to create the park, it was agreed that the number of turtles used in traditional ceremonies would be reduced and that access to the sacred islands would be granted to a small number of researchers and tourists (although research is limited to the beach, with the forest remaining off-limits). In turn, it was agreed that locals would be hired to assist with park activities. Regular turtle nest monitoring began in 2007, and youth from Roxa began to be regularly employed from 2010.

== Geography ==
Poilão is 43 ha, with sandy beaches making up 2.3 kilometres (1.4 mi) of its 4 kilometres (2.5 mi) coastline. A rocky intertidal zone stretches around the island. A rainy season occurs from May to November. It is the most remote island in the archipelago, separated from others by open ocean.

== Wildlife ==
The forests on the island are undisturbed.

The islands sacred status has contributed to it becoming a very successful green sea turtle nesting site. A survey in 2000 estimated that 7,400 green sea turtle nests were laid on the island, along with 6 hawksbill sea turtle nests. In 2014 40,000 nests were laid on the island, including more than 1,000 on some individual nights. 5% of the global green sea turtle population nests on Poilão alone, making it the largest breeding site in Africa, and one of the five largest in the world. The local green turtle population has remained stable despite a global decrease. Turtle nests are so plentiful on the island that many nests overlap. Nests here face few risks from predators or floods. Beginning in 2019, eggs from overlapping nests began to be moved to João Vieira. Small numbers of leatherback sea turtle nests are also laid annually. The nesting season runs from July to October.

Monitor lizards on the island occasionally predate turtle nests, as do Ocypode cursor crabs.

Humpback dolphins and bottlenose dolphins inhabit the waters around the island, as do fish including Caranx species, Lutjanus species, and sharks.
