= Tourism in Guinea-Bissau =

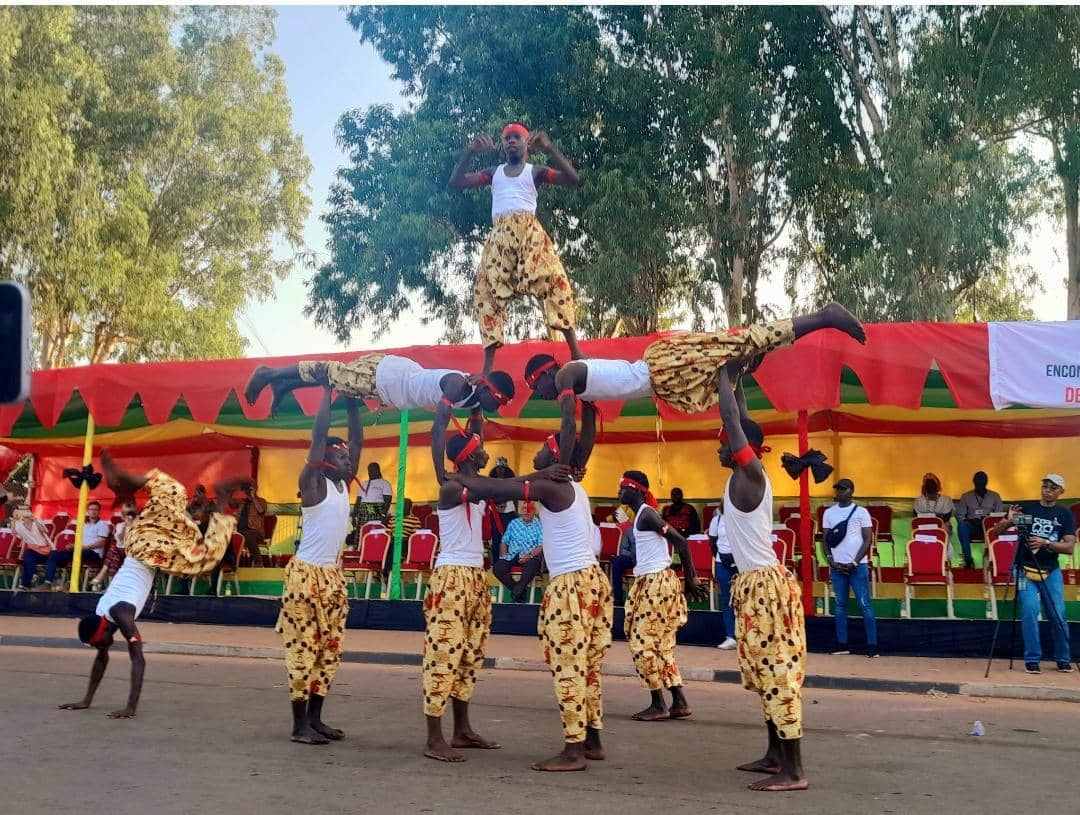
Carnival celebration in Guinea-Bissau

Tourism in Guinea-Bissau is still developing and is not yet well-established. According to the United States Department of State, there is no formal tourism industry infrastructure that exists in the country. In 2019, Guinea-Bissau received 52,400 international visitors, a decrease from 55,000 in 2018. In 2022, the government has identified the tourism sector as having significant growth potential and has dedicated more investment to develop the industry in the country.

== Overview ==
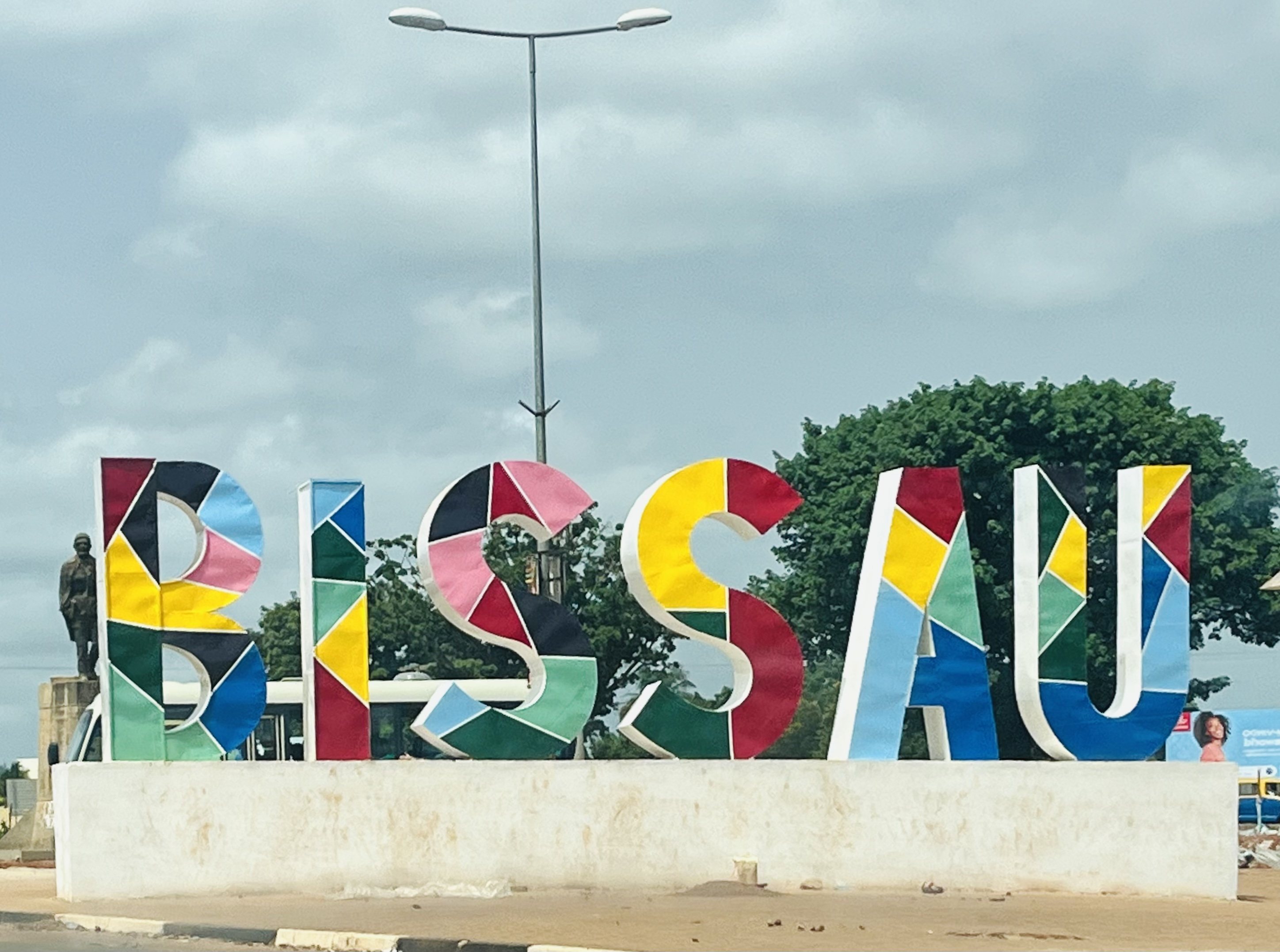
Effigy of Bissau

Guinea-Bissau is a small West African country that is approximately 36,125 square kilometers in area and has a total population of 2,132,325. Guinea-Bissau borders Guinea and Senegal. It is listed by the United Nations as a least developed country. There is just one international airport that serves the country: Osvaldo Vieira International Airport. Guinea-Bissau currently faces threats to its tourism sector from instability and environmental fragility.

Bissau is Guinea-Bissau's capital and largest city. As a former Portuguese colony, Bissau still retains some remnants such as the Bissau Cathedral and Fortaleza de São José da Amura. Bolama is a town that was previously the capital of Portuguese Guinea and some influences still remain.

Guinea-Bissau also has a few designated natural preserves that tourists can visit. These include Orango National Park and Lagoas Cufada Natural Park. The Bissagos Islands is also a tourist destination for those interested in both nature and cultural traditions. The islands are largely uninhabited and are accessible from Bissau by boat or ferry. There are hotels on the islands that also cater to recreational fishing.

== Visa Policy ==
Guinea-Bissau Visa exempt Visa on arrival / eVisa

All persons who are visiting Guinea-Bissau must obtain a visa either on arrival or in advance unless they are from a visa exempt country or territory.
