= Galinhas =

Ilha das Galinhas
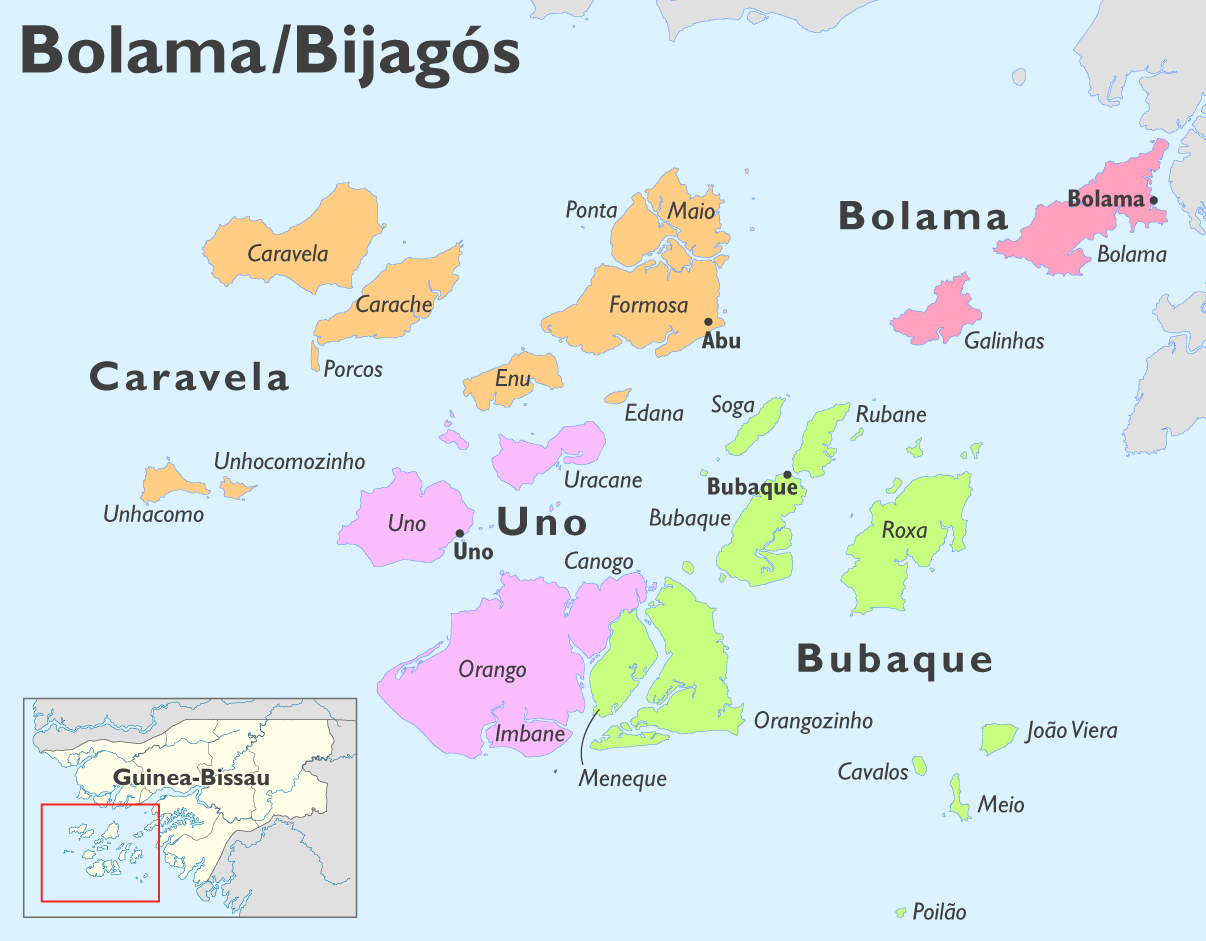
- Map of the sectors of the Bolama Region

- Location within Guinea-Bissau

Geography
- Location: Atlantic Ocean
- Coordinates: 11.4667°N 15.6833°W
- Archipelago: Bissagos Islands
- Area: 50 km^{2} (19 sq mi)
- Length: 10 km (6 mi)
- Width: 6 km (3.7 mi)

Administration
- Guinea Bissau
- Region: Bolama Region

Demographics
- Population: 1633 (2009)

Galinhas (Portuguese: Ilha das Galinhas) is an island in the Bijagós Archipelago of Guinea-Bissau. Galinhas is located about 25 km southwest of Bolama town. The Canal de Bolama separates it from Bolama Island, the easternmost island of the group that lies close to the mainland. The area of the island is 50 km^{2}, its length is 10 km and its width is 6 km.

During the colonial period a prison functioned on the island, called (in Portuguese) Colónia Penal e Agrícola da Ilha das Galinhas.

The island has a population of 1,633 (2009 census). Landmarks on the island include the former Portuguese prison and governor's house. Some boats from Bissau to Bubaque call at the island. Nearby islands and islets include Formosa to the west and Roxa to the south. There is a lighthouse on the island, with focal height 9 m (30 ft).

José Carlos Schwarz (1949-1977), a famous Bissau-Guinean poet and musician, sang a song about the island entitled Diju di Galinha.
