= List of lakes of Guinea-Bissau =

This is a list of lakes of Guinea-Bissau, located completely or partially within the country's borders.

== Lakes ==
- Cufada Lagoon
- Vendu Barássià
- Vendu Boliangà
- Vendu Cambenha
- Vendu Cantoro
- Vendu Chamo
- Vendu Coli
- Vendu Culambai
- Vendu Diderè Nora
- Vendu Jangalá
- Vendu Massabo
