= Elia Island =

Island in Guinea-Bissau

- Location within Guinea-Bissau

Geography
- Location: Cacheu River
- Coordinates: 12.2397°N 16.305°W
- Length: 10.5 km (6.52 mi)
- Width: 4.2 km (2.61 mi)
- Highest elevation: 5 m (16 ft)

Administration
- Guinea-Bissau
- Region: Cacheu Region
- Sector: São Domingos

Elia Island (Portuguese: Ilha de Elia) is an island in Guinea-Bissau. It is located on the right bank of the Cacheu River close to its mouth in the Atlantic Ocean. The island's western end lies east of the confluence with the Elia River with Ongueringao Island on the other bank. Its maximum elevation is 5 m and its length 10.5 km

== See also ==
- List of islands of Guinea-Bissau
