= Flight 331 =

Flight 331 can refer to:

- Aeroflot Flight 331, crashed in Havana, Cuba in 1977
- American Airlines Flight 331, crashed in Kingston, Jamaica in 2009
- Australian National Airways Flight 331, crashed near Nundle, New South Wales, Australia in 1948
