= Jeta (Guinea-Bissau) =

Coastal island in Guinea-Bissau

- Location within Guinea-Bissau

Geography
- Location: Atlantic Ocean
- Coordinates: 11.8833°N 16.25°W
- Area: 109 km^{2} (42 sq mi)
- Highest elevation: 7 m (23 ft)

Administration
- Guinea-Bissau
- Region: Cacheu Region
- Sector: Caió

Jeta is a coastal island in Guinea-Bissau. The island lies 1,500 meters west of the slightly larger Pecixe, and 1,700 meters south of the mainland, separated by Jeta channel. Jeta belongs to the Caió administrative sector in the Cacheu region. Its area is 109 km².

== See also ==
- List of islands of Guinea-Bissau
