= Pecixe =

Island in Guinea-Bissau

- Location within Guinea-Bissau

Geography
- Location: Atlantic Ocean
- Coordinates: 11.8333°N 16.0833°W
- Area: 167 km^{2} (64 sq mi)
- Highest elevation: 6 m (20 ft)

Administration
- Guinea-Bissau
- Region: Cacheu Region
- Sector: Caió

Demographics
- Population: 3,207 (2009)

Pecixe is a coastal island in Guinea-Bissau, belonging to the Cacheu Region and the Caió sector. Its area is 167 km^{2}. The island has a population of 3,207 (2009 census); the most populous village is Cassaca. The language of the island is reported to be Mandjak, a language of Guinea-Bissau with over 72,000 speakers altogether. Jeta island lies to the west. It is 3 km off the mainland, about 50 km west of the capital city Bissau.

== History ==
The chiefs of Pecixe tended to ally with the Papel chiefdoms in the 19th century to the east instead of their northern Manjak neighbors. This was until 1890, when they joined the Manjak Kingdom of Bassarel. However, this proved to be short lived: in 1897, the Chiefdom of Pecixe joined a successful rebellion led by Chief of Pandim with several other chiefdoms against Bassarel, leaving the kingdom with half its previous territory. The island was conquered by Portuguese forces during the Pacification Campaign in the early 20th century.

Under Portugal, Pecixe was administered jointly with Jeta and Caió until the 1940s, when the island became its own district to better exploit its natural resources.

== Climate ==
Cassaga, the largest village on the island has a tropical savanna climate (Aw) with little to no rainfall from November to May and heavy to extremely heavy rainfall from June to October.

Climate data for Cassaga
Month	Jan	Feb	Mar	Apr	May	Jun	Jul	Aug	Sep	Oct	Nov	Dec	Year
Mean daily maximum °C (°F)	31.7 (89.1)	33.3 (91.9)	34.2 (93.6)	34.2 (93.6)	33.4 (92.1)	31.7 (89.1)	29.9 (85.8)	29.1 (84.4)	30.1 (86.2)	31.5 (88.7)	32.1 (89.8)	31.2 (88.2)	31.9 (89.4)
Daily mean °C (°F)	24.4 (75.9)	25.7 (78.3)	26.7 (80.1)	27.3 (81.1)	27.7 (81.9)	27.4 (81.3)	26.5 (79.7)	25.9 (78.6)	26.4 (79.5)	27.2 (81.0)	26.9 (80.4)	24.8 (76.6)	26.4 (79.5)
Mean daily minimum °C (°F)	17.1 (62.8)	18.1 (64.6)	19.3 (66.7)	20.5 (68.9)	22.1 (71.8)	23.1 (73.6)	23.1 (73.6)	22.8 (73.0)	22.8 (73.0)	22.9 (73.2)	21.8 (71.2)	18.5 (65.3)	21.0 (69.8)
Average rainfall mm (inches)	0 (0)	0 (0)	0 (0)	0 (0)	11 (0.4)	151 (5.9)	536 (21.1)	673 (26.5)	411 (16.2)	192 (7.6)	30 (1.2)	3 (0.1)	2,007 (79)
Source: Climate-Data.org

== See also ==
- List of islands of Guinea-Bissau
