= Atlantic Flight =

Atlantic Flight refers to the following films:

- Atlantic Flight (1931 film), Italian short documentary film
- Atlantic Flight (1937 film), American film
