= Lisboa Island (Guinea-Bissau) =

- Location within Guinea-Bissau

Geography
- Location: Mansoa River
- Coordinates: 11.9833°N 15.8667°W
- Length: 9.5 km (5.9 mi)
- Width: 1.9 km (1.18 mi)
- Highest elevation: 9 m (30 ft)

Administration
- Guinea-Bissau
- Region: Cacheu Region
- Sector: Caió

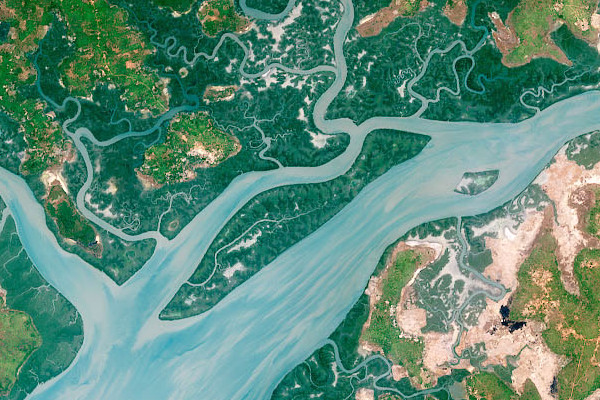
Overhead image of Lisboa Island

Lisboa Island (Portuguese: Ilha de Lisboa) is an island in Guinea-Bissau. It is located in the Mansoa River, just east of the confluence with the Baboque River. Its maximum elevation is 9 m.

== See also ==
- List of islands of Guinea-Bissau
