= Uracane =

Island in Guinea-Bissau

- Location within Guinea-Bissau

Geography
- Coordinates: 11.32038°N 16.09341°W
- Archipelago: Bissagos Islands

Administration
- Guinea-Bissau
- Region: Bolama
- Sector: Uno

Demographics
- Population: 1,181 (2009)

Uracane is an island in the Bissagos archipelago of Guinea-Bissau. The island has a population of 1,181 (2009 census). It is part of the sector of Uno within the Bolama Region. It lies northeast of the island of Uno, and south of Formosa, both of which are also part of the same archipelago.
