= Atlantic Flight (1931 film) =

1931 film

- Written by: Italian Air Force
- Produced by: Italian Air Force
- Starring: Italo Balbo; General Giuseppe Valle; Lieutenant Colonel Umberto Maddalena
- Cinematography: National Film Institute
- Edited by: Italian Air Force
- Production company: Regia Aeronautica Italiana (Italian Air Force)
- Distributed by: Tobis-Melo-Film; Listema Tobis Klangfilm
- Release date: 1931
- Running time: 10 minutes, 51 seconds
- Country: Italy
- Language: Silent film

Atlantic Flight (AKA Lo Stormo Atlantico) is a 1931 short documentary film made by the Regia Aeronautica Italiana, based on the pioneering 1930 transatlantic formation flight made by 12 Savoia-Marchetti S.55 flying boats, commanded by General Italo Balbo. Atlantic Flight is notable as the first Italian aviation film.

== Synopsis ==
The film is a brief account of a very successful Italian aviation feat: the flight of a seaplane squadron led by General Italo Balbo, Minister of Aviation, from Italy to Brazil (December 1930-January 1931)from Orbetello Airfield, Italy to Rio de Janeiro, Brazil between 17 December 1930 and 15 January 1931. Italian Air Force cinematographers filmed the entire expedition, beginning with early preparations at Ortobello Airfield.

At Ortobello, the Italian aviators chosen for the flight, lined up in a seaplane hangar, singing a nationalistic song led by General Balbo, singing alongside other officers including General Valle and Lieutenant Colonel Maddalena.

After the takeoff, a typhoon forced some of the seaplanes to land on the Spanish coast, and find shelter in a Spanish port near Cartagena. The flight continues to the Strait of Gibraltar with its headlands, then onto a stretch of Mediterranean and African coast. On reaching Kenitra on the coast of French Morocco and after visiting the areas around Villa Cisneros, Western Sahara, and Bolama Bay, Balbo planned out the longest long-distance leg, from Bolama-Natal harbor up to Rio de Janeiro.

After successfully completing the transatlantic flight, the crews are feted by Benito Mussolini.

== Cast ==
As appearing in screen titles:

- Italo Balbo
- General Giuseppe Valle
- Lieutenant Colonel Umberto Maddalena

== Production ==
Atlantic Flight was shot as a silent film and was released in Europe and the United States with Italian titles in the spring of 1931. (Note: Atlantic Flight could be considered a propaganda effort, with obvious deference to the Fascist government of Italy.)

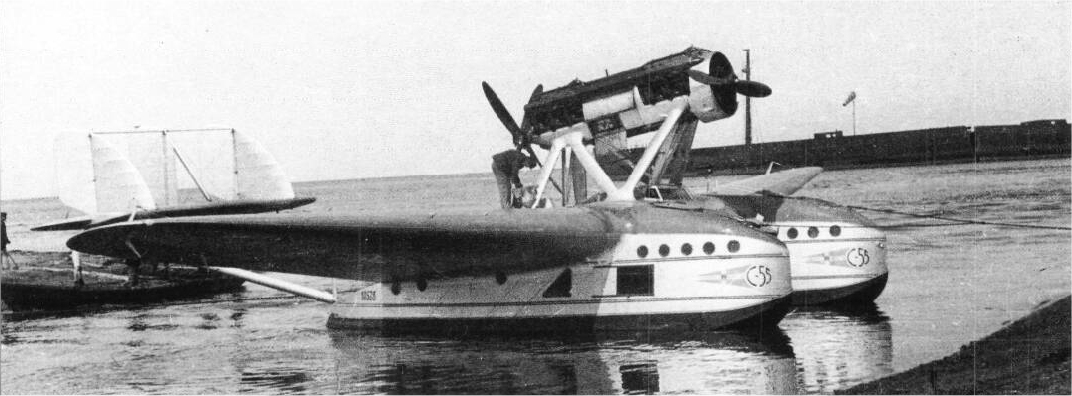
Savoia-Marchetti S.55P c. 1930

== Reception ==
Aviation film historian Stephen Pendo in Aviation in the Cinema (1985) dismissed the film, despite its historical value, as a "routine, uninspired documentary". Aviation film historian Michael Paris in From the Wright Brothers to Top Gun: Aviation, Nationalism, and Popular Cinema (1995) shared a similar perspective on the film. "Although the flight itself was hailed in Italy as a 'modern epic', the cinematic version lacks drama and a proper sense of the achievement ..."
