= João Vieira (island) =

- Location in Guinea-Bissau

Geography
- Location: Atlantic Ocean
- Coordinates: 11°02′N 15°38′W
- Archipelago: Bijagós Islands

Administration
- Guinea-Bissau
- Region: Bolama Region
- Sector: Bubaque

Demographics
- Population: 6

João Vieira is an island in the Bijagós Archipelago of Guinea-Bissau. Its population is 6 (2009 census). It is part of the João Vieira and Poilão Marine National Park. It lies 11 nmi (20 km) north-northeast of the island Poilão. Other nearby islands are Meio and Cavalos. The islands are important nesting grounds for sea turtles. Administratively João Vieira belongs to the Bubaque sector in the Bolama region. It is located south of Roxa Island and northeast of Cavalos and Meio.
