= José Carlos Schwarz =

- Born: December 6, 1949; Bissau, Portuguese Guinea
- Died: May 27, 1977 (aged 27); Havana, Cuba
- Occupations: Poet; Musician

José Carlos Schwarz (Bissau, December 6, 1949 – Havana, May 27, 1977) was a Bissau-Guinean poet and musician.

== Biography ==
José Carlos Schwarz was born in Bissau (Portuguese Guinea) from well-to-do parents of Cape Verdean, Portuguese Guinean, and German descent. After his high school education in Senegal and Cape Verde and a short stay in Lisbon, he returned to Guinea-Bissau in 1969. In 1970 he formed the Le Cobiana Djazz band with a group of friends (Aliu Bari, Mamadu Bá, and Samakê). The band was a considerable local success, partly because the band started to play more and more gumbe, an original West African music style. Schwarz wrote in Portuguese and French, but he sang in Creole.

He also became politically active and joined the resistance against the colonial ruler. He was imprisoned and tortured by the PIDE/DGS and transported to Ilha das Galinhas (Guinea-Bissau) for his participation in the struggle for the independence of his country, where he spent two years in prison. Inspired by this experience, he composed the song "Djiu Di Galinha".

Following the independence of Guinea-Bissau in 1974, Schwarz became director of the Department for Art and Culture, also responsible for Guinea-Bissau's youth policy. In 1977 he got a job at the Guinea-Bissau embassy in Cuba. On May 27 of the same year, Schwarz died in a plane crash near Havana.

== Discography ==
| Title | Storage medium | Year | Label |
|---|---|---|---|
| Djiu Di Galinha | LP (album) | 1978 | Departamento Da Edição-Difusão Do Livro E Do Disco, Do Comissariado De Estado Da Guine-Bissau |
| José Carlos Schwarz Et Le Cobiana Jazz - Vol. 1. Guinée Bissau | LP (album) | 1978 | Sonafric |
| José Carlos Schwarz Et Le Cobiana Jazz - Vol. 2. Guinée Bissau | LP | 1978 | Sonafric |
| José Carlos Schwarz & Le Cobiana Djazz - Lua Ki Di Nos | LP (compilation) | 2021 | Hot Mule Records |

=== Songs ===
- Ke ki mininu na tchora (Why is that child crying?) "Unknown hunters shelled the village";"Black fighters, black just like us", a reference to the conflicts between Bissau-Guineans who fought with the colonial army and the freedom fighters.
- Mindjeris di panu pretu (Women in black clothes), a tribute to the war widows.
- Djiu di Galinha - Ilha das Galinhas - the Chicken Island, the island where Schwarz was imprisoned
