= João Vieira and Poilão Marine National Park =

Protected area in Guinea-Bissau

João Vieira and Poilão Islands Marine National Park
- Parque Nacional Marinho João Vieira e Poilão
- IUCN category II (national park)
- Location within Guinea-Bissau
- Location: Bolama Region, Guinea-Bissau
- Coordinates: 10.9°N 15.7°W
- Area: 495.0 km^{2} (191.1 sq mi)
- Created: August 2000

João Vieira and Poilão Marine National Park (Portuguese: Parque Nacional Marinho João Vieira e Poilão) is a national park in Guinea-Bissau. It was established in August 2000. It covers an area of 495.0 square kilometres (191.1 sq mi) and includes the uninhabited islands of João Vieira, Cavalos, Meio and Poilão, and some smaller islets in the southeastern part of the Bijagós Archipelago. The beaches of the islands are frequented by the sea turtle species Chelonia mydas, Eretmochelys imbricata and Lepidochelys olivacea.

== History and cultural relevance ==
While not permanently inhabited, the islands are visited for fishing, palm tree harvesting, and some agriculture. The island of Poilão is considered a sacred site by indigenous people. Due to this status, turtle eggs from the island were not poached by local communities, unlike those elsewhere in the archipelago. Turtles from the area traditionally served as both an important source of resources and a part of local cultures.

Negotiations with local communities began in the 1990s, to ensure access to what were sacred areas. Locals informed researchers that they believed turtle populations had been decreasing. Turtle tagging began in 1994, and towards the end of the decade instances of itinerant poaching were recorded. The process to establish a protected area began in 1998, and the park was formally established in August 2000 via decree 6-A/2000.

A National Action Plan for the Conservation of Sea Turtles has been created and implemented by the Institute of Biodiversity and Protected Areas to help protect the islands.

== Geography ==
The park covers the southeastern Bijagós Archipelago, in particular the uninhabited islands of João Vieira, Meio, Cavalos, and Poilão, and three smaller islets. The total area is 49,500 ha, of which 47,943 ha is ocean. The larger archipelago is considered a biosphere reserve. Poilão is 43 ha, with sandy beaches making up 2.3 kilometres (1.4 mi) of its 4 kilometres (2.5 mi) coastline.

== Wildlife ==
In addition to mangroves, the islands are covered by sub-humid forests and palm trees, in particular Elaeis guineensis. The forests contain grey parrots, and are breeding spots for West African crested terns, Caspian terns, and black terns. A total of 163 bird species have been identified on the islands.

The beaches serve as nesting grounds for green sea turtles, hawksbill sea turtles, and olive ridley sea turtles. Poilão is a particularly important breeding site for Eastern Atlantic turtle populations. A survey in 2000 estimated that 7,400 green sea turtle nests were laid on the island, along with 6 hawksbill turtle nests. In 2014 40,000 nests were laid on the island, including more than 1,000 on some individual nights. 5% of the global green sea turtle population nests on Poilão alone, making it the largest breeding site in Africa, and one of the five largest in the world. The local green turtle population has remained stable despite a global decrease. Turtle nests are so plentiful on the island that many nests overlap. Meio island faces similar concentrations of turtle nests. On both islands the nests face few risks from predators or floods. Beginning in 2019, eggs from overlapping nests on these two islands began to be moved to João Vieira. While other islands were known by locals to have had historically large populations, many now see little to no nesting. While some turtles range along the West African coastline between nesting seasons, others remain within the local archipelago. Loggerhead sea turtles are found in the waters of Guinea-Bissau, but are not known to nest there.

Humpback dolphins and bottlenose dolphins inhabit the waters of the park, as do fish including Caranx species, Lutjanus species, and sharks.
