= Orangozinho =

Island in the Bissagos Islands

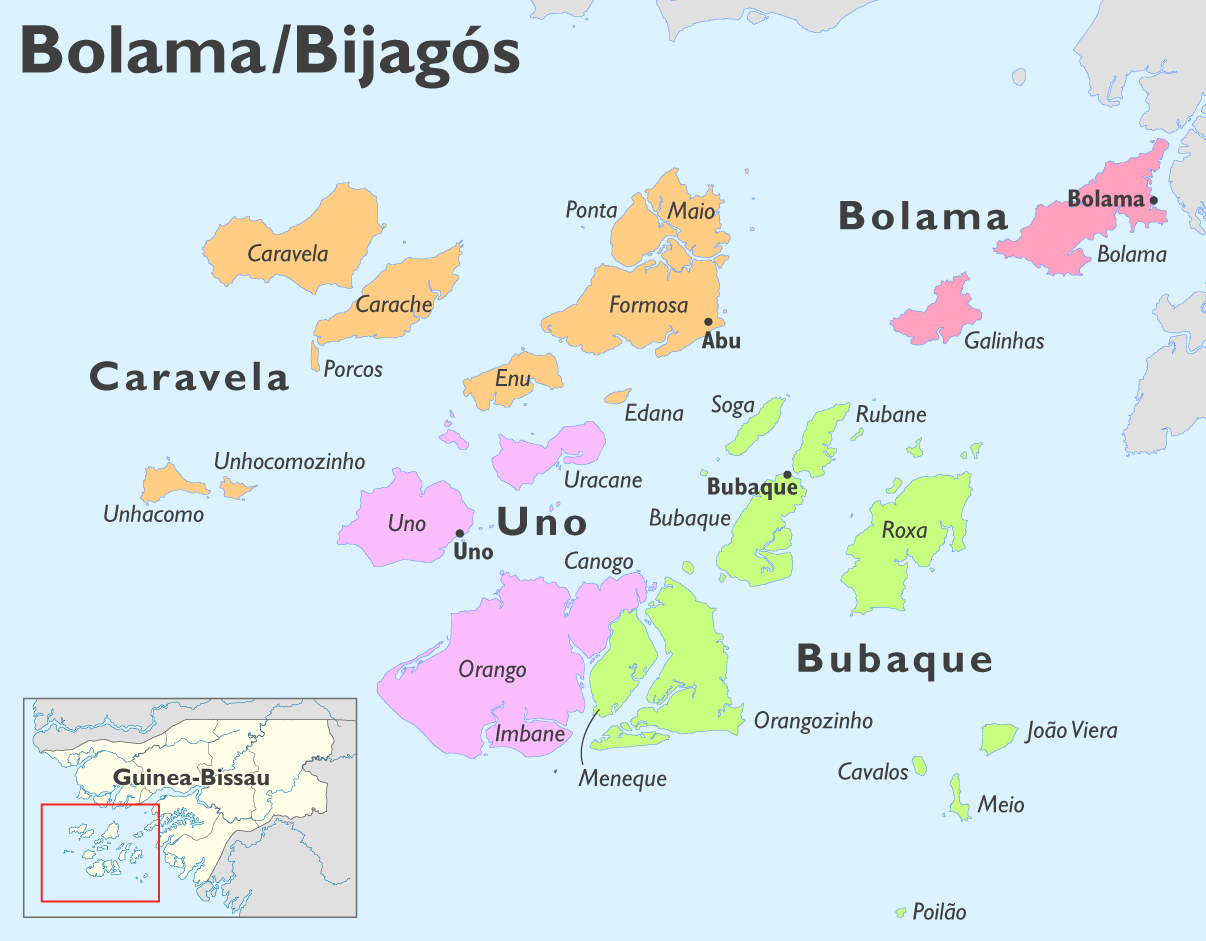
- Orangozinho in the Bubaque Sector
- Interactive map of Orangozinho

Geography
- Location: Atlantic Ocean
- Coordinates: 11.11979°N 15.93155°W
- Archipelago: Bijagós Archipelago
- Area: 107 km^{2} (41 sq mi)
- Length: 19 km (11.8 mi)
- Width: 11.8 km (7.33 mi)

Administration
- Guinea-Bissau
- Region: Bolama

Demographics
- Population: 706 (2009)

Orangozinho (Portuguese meaning Little Orango) is an island in the southern part of the Bijagos Archipelago, in Guinea-Bissau. It is part of the Bubaque sector in the Bolama Region. With an area of 107 km^{2} (41 sq mi), the island is part of the Orango National Park, a UNESCO Biosphere Reserve. The island's terrain is low-lying with extensive mangrove and savannah ecosystems. As of 2009, the island supported around 706 Bijagó people, living in matriarchal, animist communities. The economy is based on fishing, small-scale agriculture, and tourism.

== Geography ==
Orangozinho island is located in the southern part of the Bijagos Archipelago, in Guinea-Bissau. It is part of the Bubaque sector in the Bolama Region. With an area of 107 km^{2} (41 sq mi), the island measures 19 km (12 mi) by length and 11.8 km (7.3 mi) by width, and had a 131 km (81 mi) long coastline.

Neighbouring islands are Bubaque to the north, Roxa or Canhabaque to the northeast, Meneque to the west and Canogo to the northwest. Along with the nearby islands, it forms part of the Orango National Park. The Bijagós archipelago is located along the deltaic system of the Geba River, encompassing mangroves, mudflats, savannas, and tidal zones across numerous islands. The island is predominantly flat, with a mean elevation of 8 m (26 ft) and maximum altitude around 18 m (59 ft), characterized by plains and tidal wetlands. Nearly 48% of the island has a tree cover, chiefly consisting of dense mangrove forests. Inland areas amongst grasslands, lagoons, and palm groves, reflect the typical landscape.

The Orango hosts several reptile, bird and mammal species. Birds found include Caspian tern, (Sterna caspia), grey-headed gull (Larus cirrhocephalus), Senegal parrot (Poicephalus senegalus), and Gray parrot (Psittacus erithacus timneh). Mammals gound in the part include hippopotamus, African manatee, and several species of monkeys. There are several sea turtles along the coast.

== Demographics ==
As of 2009, the island had a population of 706, most of them in the largest village of Wite. The population consists largely of the Bijagó ethnic group.
