= Orango =

Island in the Bijagós Archipelago

Native name: Orango
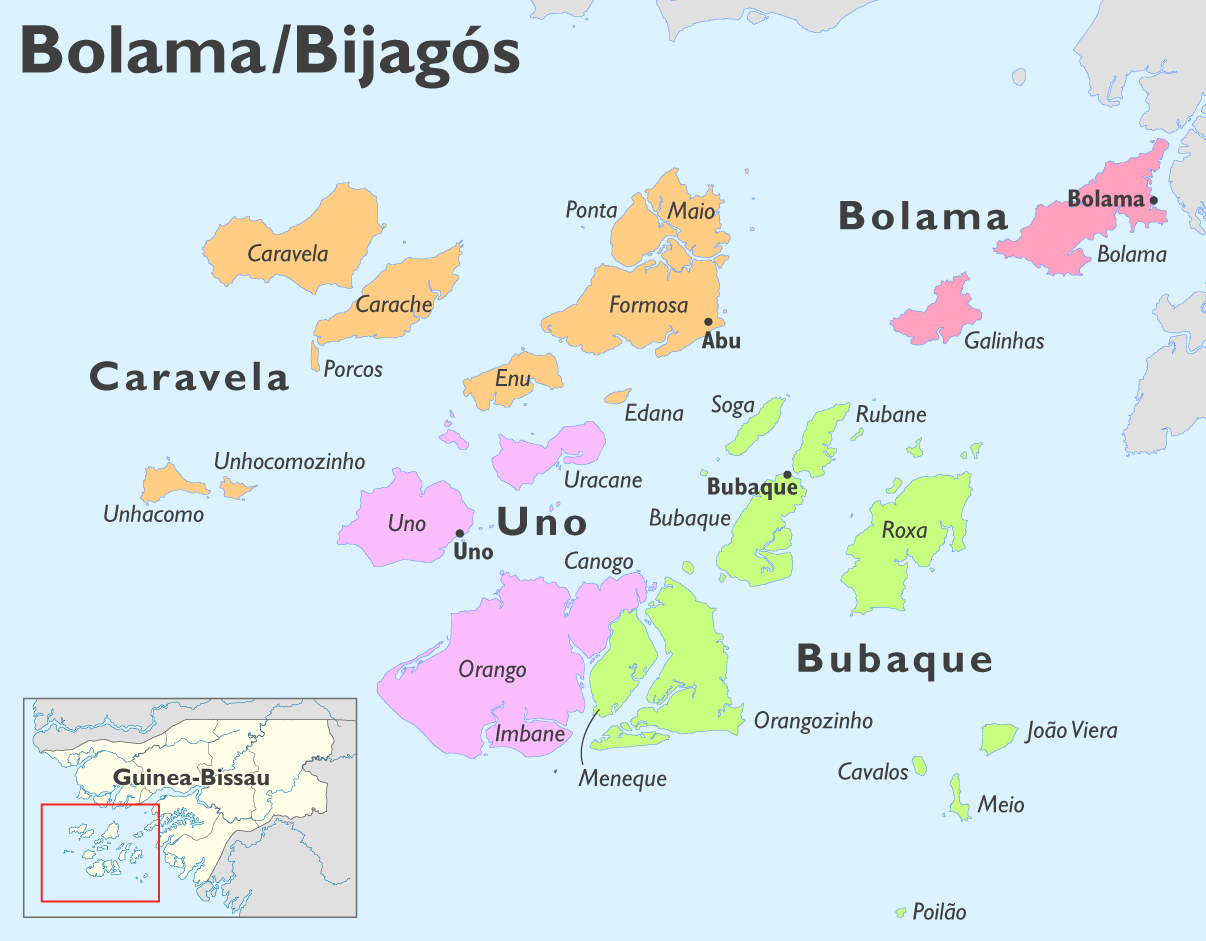
- Orango in the Uno Sector
- Interactive map of Orango

Geography
- Location: Atlantic Ocean
- Coordinates: 11.12°N 16.13°W
- Archipelago: Bijagós Archipelago
- Area: 272.5 km^{2} (105.2 sq mi)
- Length: 22.5 km (13.98 mi)
- Width: 22.5 km (13.98 mi)

Administration
- Guinea-Bissau
- Region: Bolama

Demographics
- Population: 1,250 (2009)

Orango is one of the Bijagós Islands, located 60 kilometres (30 nautical miles) off the coast of mainland Guinea-Bissau. At 272.5 km^{2} (105 1/4 sq mi), it is the largest island in the archipelago. The island has a population of 1,250 (2009 census); the largest village is Eticoga. With the neighbouring islands Imbone, Canongo, Meneque and Orangozinho, it forms the Orango National Park. It belongs to the Uno Sector.

Orango is known for its saltwater hippopotamuses. It was the seat of Okinka Pampa until her death in 1930.

== Matrimonial traditions ==
Orango's inhabitants developed a number of distinct matrimonial traditions which are unique with respect to the role played by women. Marriage is formally proposed by women — their choice of spouse is made public to the groom-to-be and the rest of the community by an offer of a dish of specially prepared fish, marinated in red palm oil. According to tradition, the offer is accepted by eating the fish, and cannot be turned down without dishonor. The marriage becomes official months later, after the bride-to-be, with no help from the groom, builds the couple a new home out of driftwood, blond grass, and mud bricks.

In recent years, the island's traditions are competing with outside influences, both economic and religious. Men increasingly travel to the mainland to work, bringing back the mainland's trappings and ideas. Men and women have adopted religious practices introduced by Protestant missionaries, which have also reduced the influences of the island's matrimonial traditions.
