= Canghungo =

Sector of the Cacheu Region in Guinea-Bissau

Canchungo
- Sector
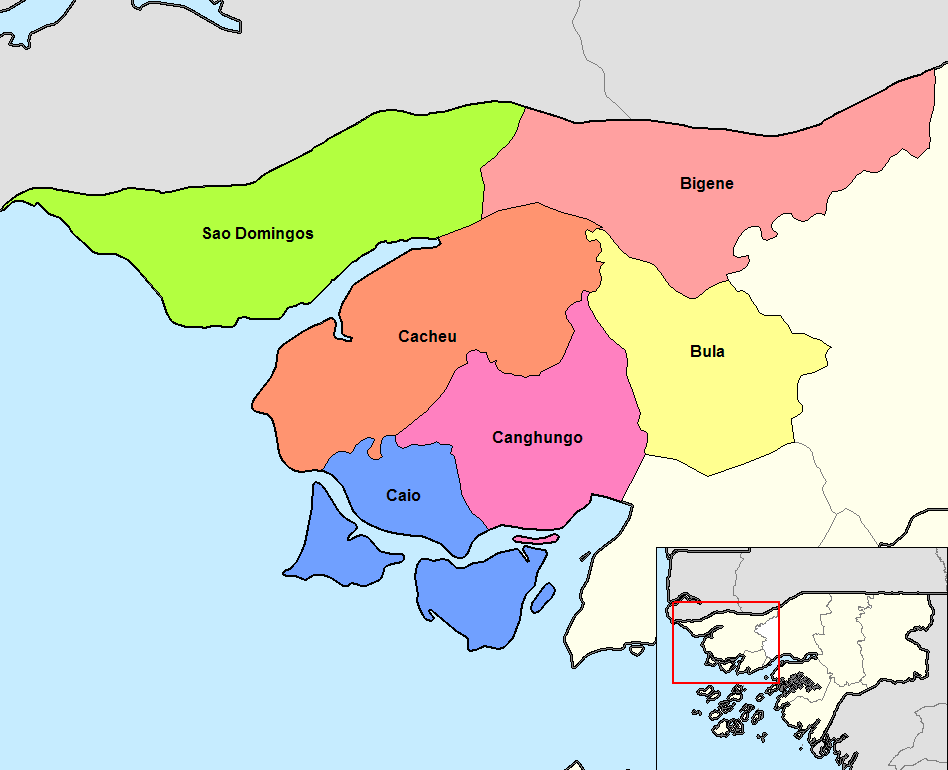
- A map showing the sectors of Guinea-Bissau; Canchungo is on the bottom right in pink.
- Interactive map of Canchungo
- Coordinates: 12°26′39″N 15°52′01″W
- Country: Guinea-Bissau
- Region: Cacheu
- Time zone: UTC+0:00 (GMT)

Canchungo is a Sector in the Cacheu Region of Guinea-Bissau.
