= Rubane =

One of the Bijagós Islands in Guinea-Bissau

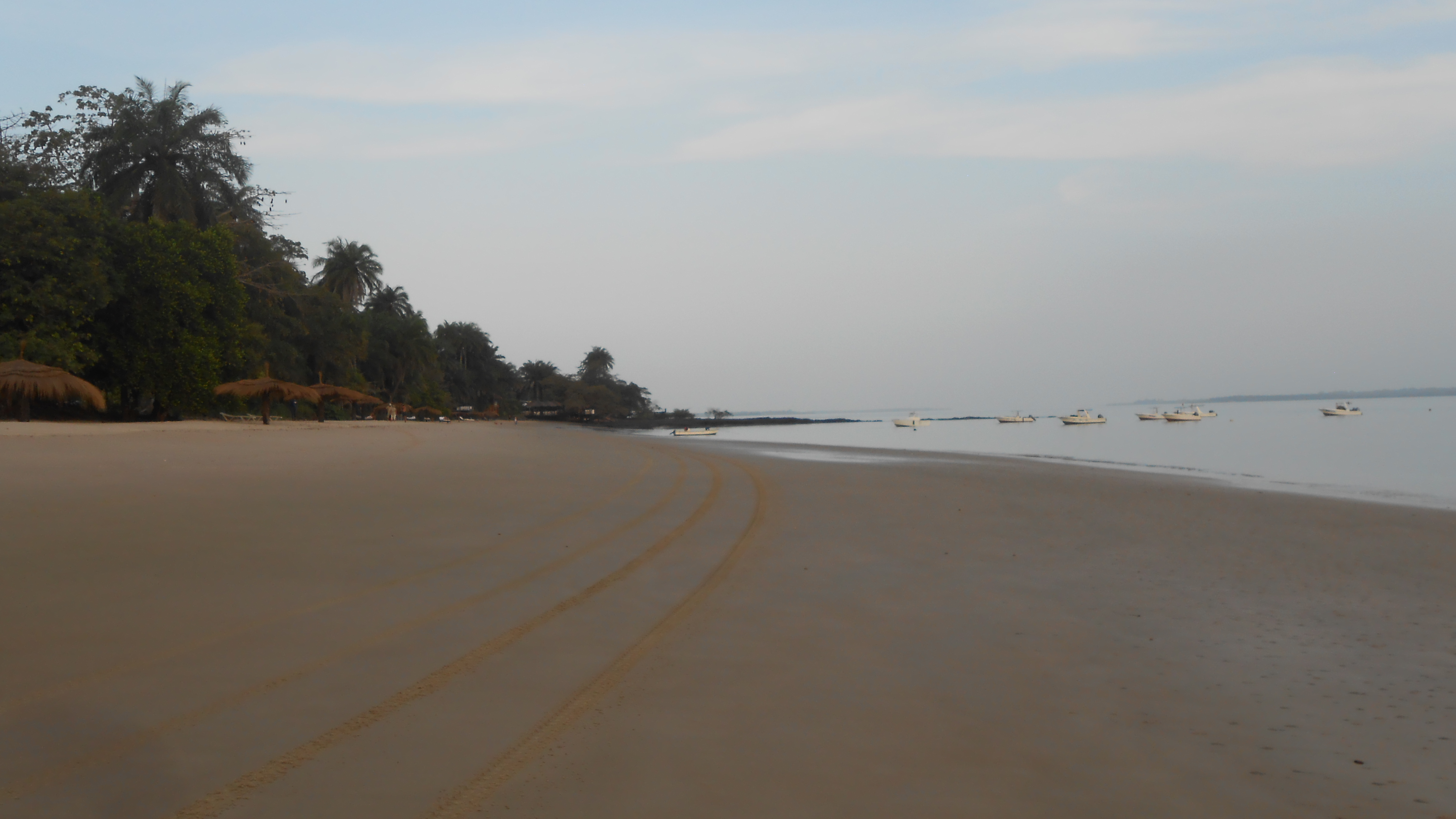

- Location within Guinea-Bissau

Geography
- Coordinates: 11°20′8″N 15°48′41″W
- Archipelago: Bissagos Islands

Administration
- Guinea-Bissau
- Region: Bolama
- Sector: Bubaque

Demographics
- Population: 165 (2009)

Rubane is one of the Bijagós Islands in Guinea-Bissau. The island has a population of 165 (2009 census). The island lies northeast of the larger island of Bubaque, across a narrow strait. Administratively, it is part of Bubaque sector, Bolama Region. The island also forms part of the Boloma Bijagós Biosphere Reserve.
