= Okinka Pampa =

Queen-priestess of the Bijagos of Orango

Okinka Pampa Kanyimpa, sometimes Kanjimpa (died 1930), was a queen and okinka ("priestess") of the Bijagos of Orango, in the Bissagos Islands of Guinea-Bissau. She lived in Angagumé. She reigned in 1910–1930.

Queen Pampa Kanyimpa, member of the Okinka clan, succeeded her father Bankajapa as ruler of the island. She was entrusted to protect the island's ancestors and be the keeper of its traditions around 1910. This was a time when the government of Portugal was preparing to occupy the Bissagos archipelago as part of its territorial claims in Africa. Portugal saw the islands as an opportunity to expand their trade ports and improve the economy for Portuguese settlers. In an attempt to maintain peace, she resisted their campaigns for some time before ultimately signing a peace treaty with them. At the same time, she implemented societal reforms that expanded the rights of women and ended slavery. Okinka Pampa died in 1930 of natural causes; her legacy is today still celebrated in the islands and on the mainland. She was the last queen of the Bijago people. Okinka Pampa is still worshiped throughout the archipelago, and her tomb may still be visited.
