= Melo Island =

Coastal island in Guinea-Bissau

Melo
- Location within Guinea-Bissau

Geography
- Location: Atlantic Ocean
- Coordinates: 11.033°N 15.2167°W
- Length: 14.3 km (8.89 mi)
- Width: 6.8 km (4.23 mi)
- Highest elevation: 8 m (26 ft)

Administration
- Guinea-Bissau
- Region: Tombali Region
- Sector: Bedanda

Melo (Portuguese: Ilha de Melo) is a coastal island in Guinea-Bissau. It is located between the mouths of rivers Cumbijã and Cacine. Its maximum elevation is 8 m.

== See also ==
- List of islands of Guinea-Bissau
