= Uno (Guinea-Bissau) =

Island in Guinea-Bissau

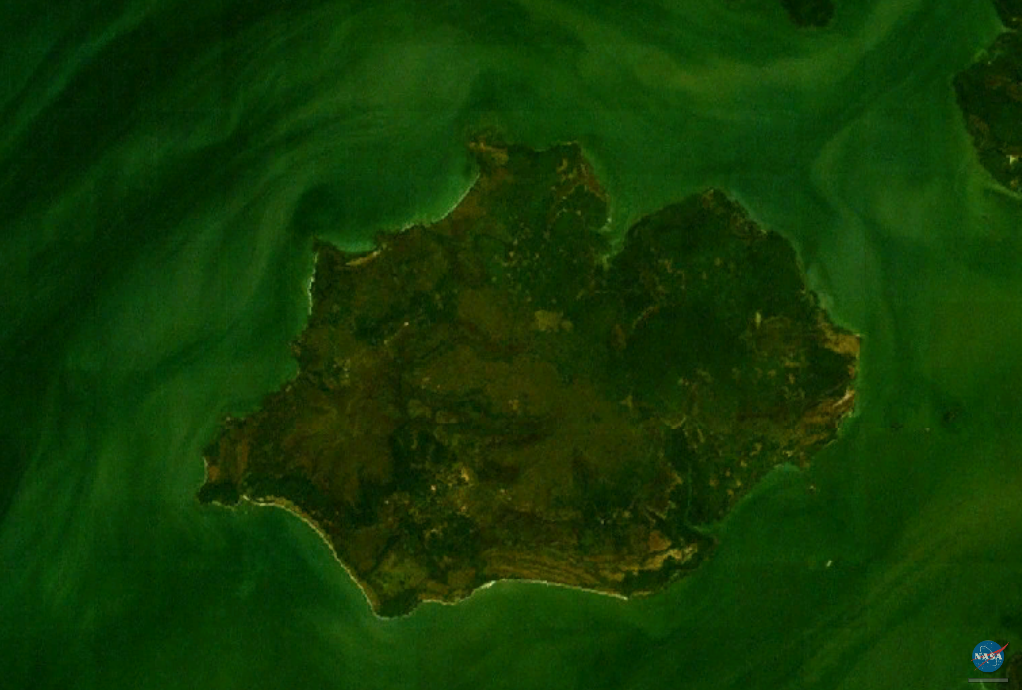
- NASA satellite image of Uno Island

- Location within Guinea-Bissau

Geography
- Coordinates: 11.254°N 16.219°W
- Archipelago: Bissagos Islands
- Area: 104 km^{2} (40 sq mi)

Administration
- Guinea-Bissau
- Region: Bolama

Demographics
- Population: 3,324 (2009)

Additional information
- Time zone: Greenwich Mean Time (UTC+00:00)

Uno is an island in the Bissagos archipelago off the coast of Guinea-Bissau, in the Atlantic Ocean. The land area is 104 km^{2} (40 sq mi), with a population of 3,324 (2009).

Uno and the Bissagos Islands are part of the Boloma Bijagós Biosphere Reserve, a UNESCO Biosphere Reserve designated in 1996.

== Government ==
The Uno Sector, part of the Bolama Region, covers Uno and the nearby islands of Eguba, Orango, Unhocomo, Unhocomozinho and Uracane. The sector's population is 6,751 (2009 census).
