= Bolama region =

Region of Guinea-Bissau

Coordinates: 11°20′N 16°5′W

Bolama
- Region
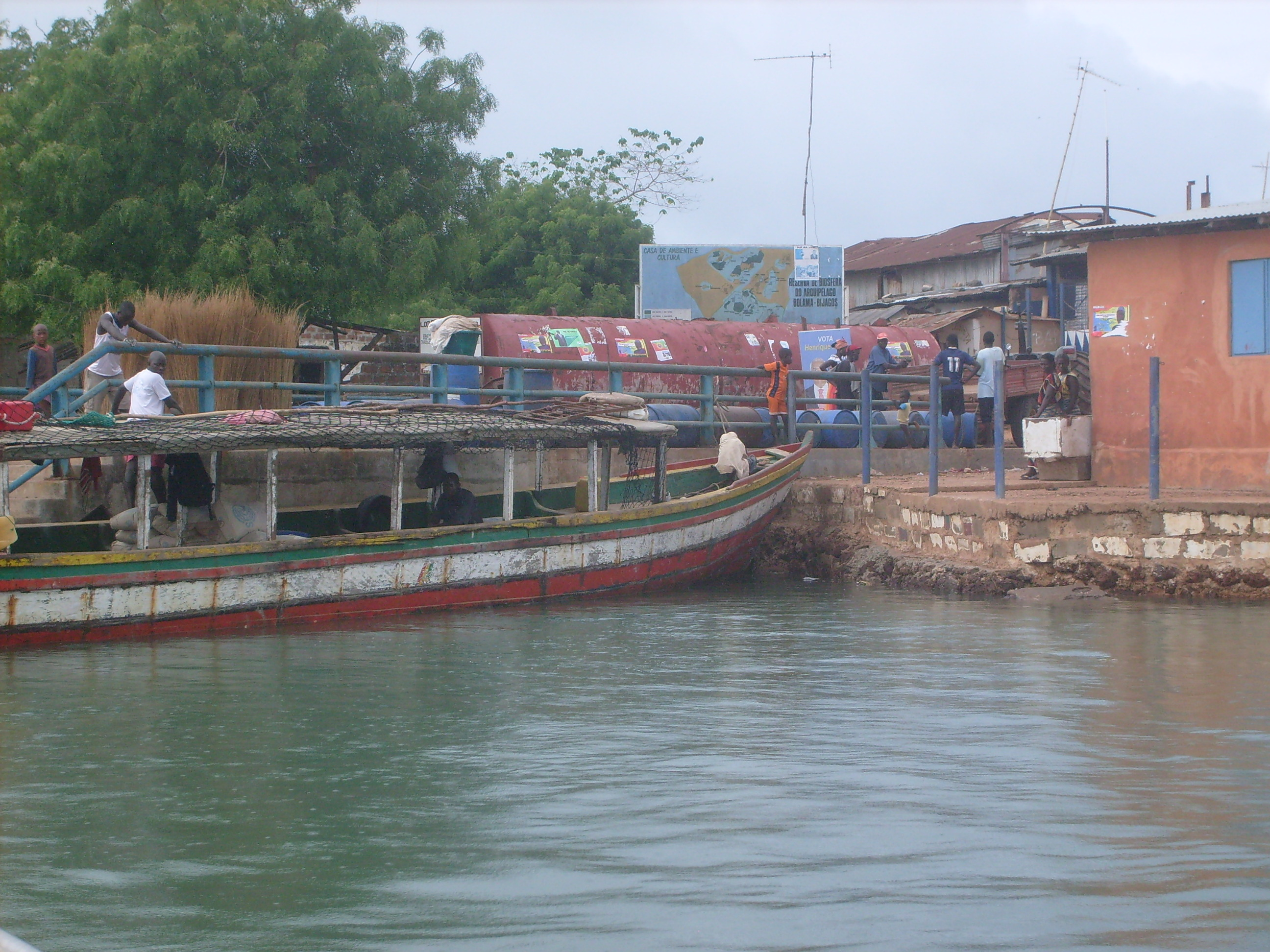

- Bolama Region
- Country: Guinea-Bissau
- Seat: Bolama
- Sectors: Bolama, Bubaque, Caravela

Area
  - Total: 2,624.4 km^{2} (1,013.3 sq mi)

Population (2009)
  - Total: 34,563
  - Density: 13.170/km^{2} (34.110/sq mi)
- ISO 3166 code: GW-BL

Bolama is an administrative region in Guinea-Bissau, consisting primarily of the Bijagós Archipelago off the country's southern coast, together with a small coastal strip centred on the coastal town of São João. It has an area of 2,624 km^{2}. Its capital is Bolama, on the island of the same name. It is a coastal region covered with Mangrove swamps, rain forest and tangled forest and receives an annual rainfall of more than 1,000 mm (39 in).

As of 2009, the total population of the region was 32,424, with the urban population being 9,118 and rural being 23,306. The sex ratio of the region is 97 females for every hundred males. As of 2009, the net activity rate was 48.88 per cent, proportion of employed labour force was 33.32 per cent, proportion of labour force was 75.77 and the proportion of potentially active population was 33.32 per cent. The absolute poverty rate, people earning less than $2 a day, in the region stood at 51.6 per cent, with a regional contribution of 20.6 per cent to the national poverty totals.

== Administration ==
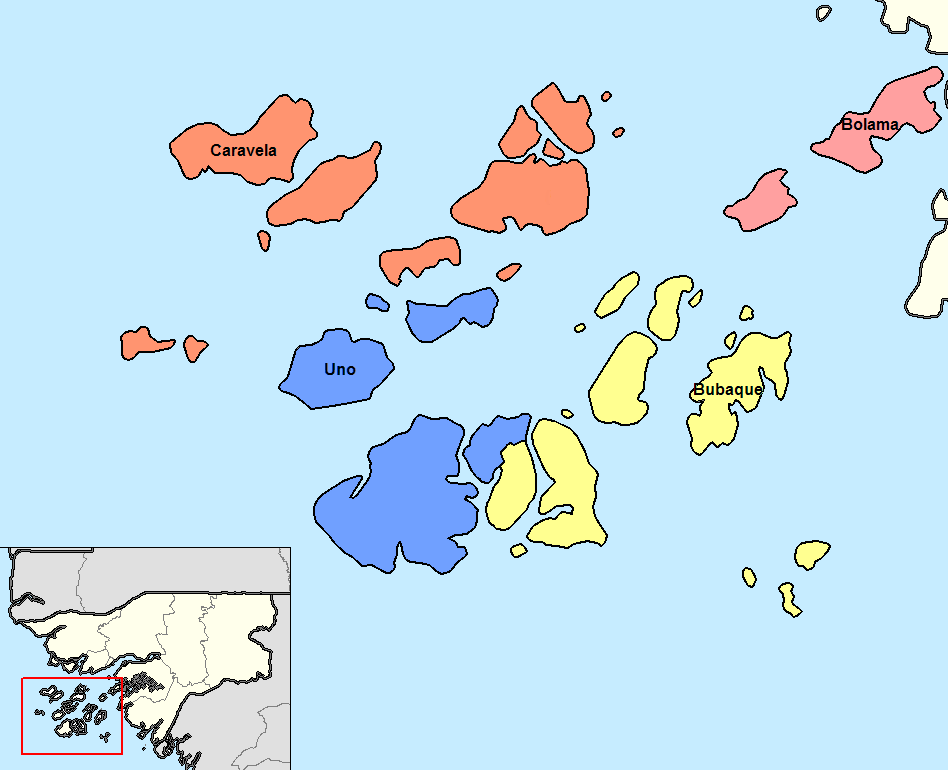
Sectors of the Bolama Region

Bolama is divided into four administrative sectors:

- Bolama, comprising the islands of Bolama and Galinhas, and some adjacent islands in the north-east of the region, together with the coastal strip;
- Bubaque, consisting of various islands including Bubaque, Orangozinho, Meneque, Soga, Rubane, Roxa and João Viera, all in the south-east of the Bijagós Archipelago;
- Caravela, consisting of various islands including Caravela, Carache, Enu, Formosa, Ponta and Maio, all in the north-west of the Bijagós Archipelago;
- Uno, consisting of the islands Uno, Orango, Uracane, Eguba, Unhacomo, Unhocomozinho and others, in the south-west of the region.

Guinea-Bissau unilaterally proclaimed its independence from Portugal on 24 September 1973 after wars and diplomatic political actions under the Partido Africano da Independência da Guiné e Cabo Verde (PAIGC). Portugal acknowledged the independence of Guinea-Bissau in 1974 and Cape Verde on 5 July 1975. PAIGC ruled both the countries after independence. While international funds came pouring in for the economic development of the nation, the party was accused of misusing power in authoritarian manner (Guinea-Bissau only). In 14 November 1980, there was the first military coup in Guinea-Bissau led by João Bernardo Vieira, Nino, removing Luis Cabral from the Presidency of the Republic. The one-party state mechanism was turbulent during the period of 1980s and 1990s with army taking control of power more frequently and the resultant civil war resulted in loss of property and lives. To decentralize power, an administrative region and eight regions were created. There has not been any local administration since the civil war of 1998-99 and all the social services are done by organs of civil society and other government agencies. There is minimal health and education services offered by the government and all the government departments have operated in a limited fashion. A transitional government was selected during 2003-4 with an adopted Public Transition Charter. The Military Committee appointed two civilians as interim President and Prime Minister. Elections were held for a five-year term on 24 July 2005 with a multi party representation. There was a military coup in 2012, after which EU and international donations stopped. The latest elections were held during April 2014 with 13 Presidential candidates and representation from 15 parties. The elections were monitored by 550 international observers. Jose Mario Vaz and his party, won the Presidential and parliamentary elections against the military backed Nuno Gomes Nabiam.

== Geography ==
Bolama is a low-lying coastal archipelago and the low-lying coastal areas are periodically submerged during high tide. All the coastal regions have a maximum elevation of 300 m (980 ft). The internal region has plains, which are interspersed with rias. There are lot of meandering rivers, many of them forming estuaries in the coastal regions. The principal river, Cacheu, flows through the region. The climate is hot and tropical and the region has two seasons. The onset of summer is from December to May with April - May period having temperature ranges from 20 °C (68 °F) to 30 °C (86 °F). The rainy season is usually from May to November. The region receives an average rainfall of around 2,000 mm (79 in) compared to the inland regions, which receive 1,000 mm (39 in). The coastal regions are covered with Mangrove swamps, rain forest and tangled forest.

== Demographics ==
Historical population
Year	Pop.	±%
1979	25,743	—
1991	26,891	+4.5%
2005	31,157	+15.9%
2006	31,472	+1.0%
2007	31,789	+1.0%
2008	32,106	+1.0%
2009	32,424	+1.0%
2010	32,744	+1.0%
2011	33,064	+1.0%
2012	33,385	+1.0%

As of 2009, the total population of the region was 32,424, with the urban population being 9,118 and rural being 23,306. The sex ratio of the region is 97 females for every hundred males. The total resident population in the region is 32,424. The total agricultural population in the region is 7,540. The average number of household in the region is 6.7 and the density of the population is 12.4 km^{2}. The intercensal rate of average annual growth (adjusted data) is 2.39 per cent. The non-agricultural population in the country is 24,884. The total number of households per capita in the region is 4,839. The fraction of Christians in the region is 30.7 per cent, Muslims is 14.90 per cent, animists is 24.60 per cent, not detailed was 25.70 per cent and people following no religion was 4.2 per cent.

Faith	Percentage
Christian	30.7%
Muslim	14.9%
Animist	24.6%
Not Detailed	25.7%
No Religion	4.2%

== Economy ==
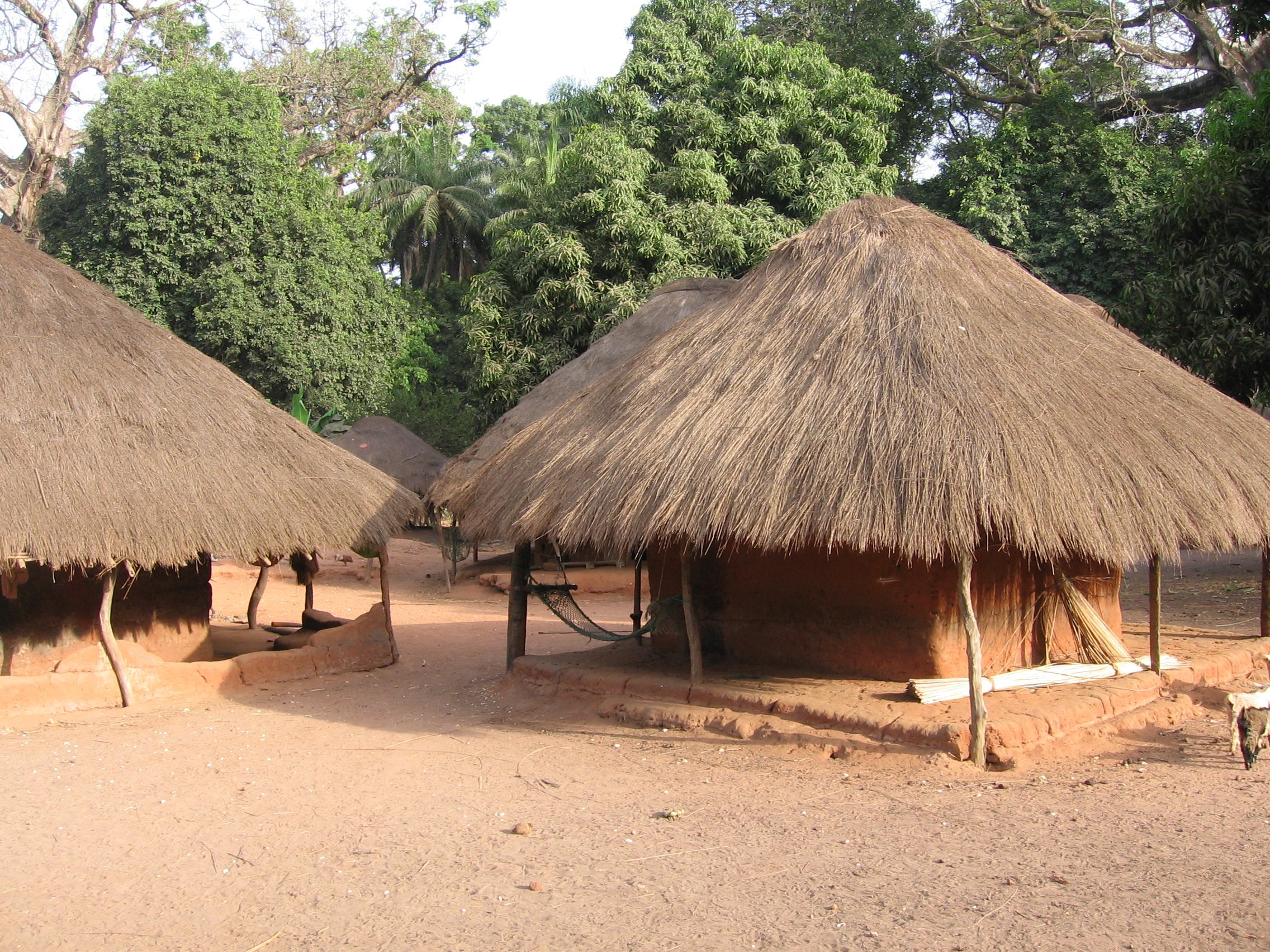
A house in Caravela

As of 2009, the net activity rate was 48.88 per cent, proportion of employed labour force was 33.32 per cent, proportion of labour force was 75.77 and the proportion of potentially active population was 33.32 per cent. The major economic activity in the parts around the rivers and the coastal areas was fishing, while it was agriculture in the inland areas. As of 2011, the total population which was active constitutes 60 per cent nationwide indicating there are lot of employed people. But the poverty rate was very high in the country with an estimated two-thirds below the poverty line. Out of the working population, an estimated 58.4 per cent are employed in freelance activities, while wage earners formed 42 per cent. The unemployment in the region as of 2001 was 10.2 per cent, compared to the capital Bissau which has 19.3 per cent. Totally 63.5 per cent were employed in agriculture (including forestry), 8.9 in industry and 6.1 per cent in public administration. As per IMF report in 2011, people who were engaged in agriculture were poorer compared to others, while educated and higher educated people earned more. The absolute poverty rate, people earning less than $2 a day, in the region stood at 51.6 per cent, with a regional contribution of 20.6 per cent to the national poverty totals.

== See also ==
- Regions of Guinea-Bissau
- Sectors of Guinea-Bissau
