= Lisboa (surname) =

Lisboa is a Portuguese surname. Notable people with the surname include:

- Adriana Lisboa (born 1970), Brazilian writer
- Carlos Lisboa (born 1958), Portuguese basketball player and coach
- Duda Lisboa (born 1998), Brazilian beach volleyball player
- Irene Lisboa (1892–1958), Portuguese writer
- José Camillo Lisboa (1823–1897), Goan botanist and physician
- Lidi Lisboa (born 1984), Brazilian actress
- Mel Lisboa (born 1982), Brazilian actress
- Rafael Lisboa (born 1999), Portuguese basketballer
- Sofia Lisboa (born 1977), Portuguese singer
