= Unhocomo =

Island in the Bissagos archipelago

- Island
- Location in Guinea-Bissau
- Coordinates: 11°17′44″N 16°26′41″W
- Country: Guinea-Bissau
- Archipelago: Bissagos
- Sector: Uno
- Time zone: UTC+0:00 (GMT)

Unhocomo is the westernmost island in the Bissagos archipelago of Guinea-Bissau. It forms part of Uno Sector, Bolams Region. In 2009 its population was 678. It lies 15 km west of Uno island, in the same archipelago.
