= Aeroflot Flight 331 =

1977 aviation accident in Cuba

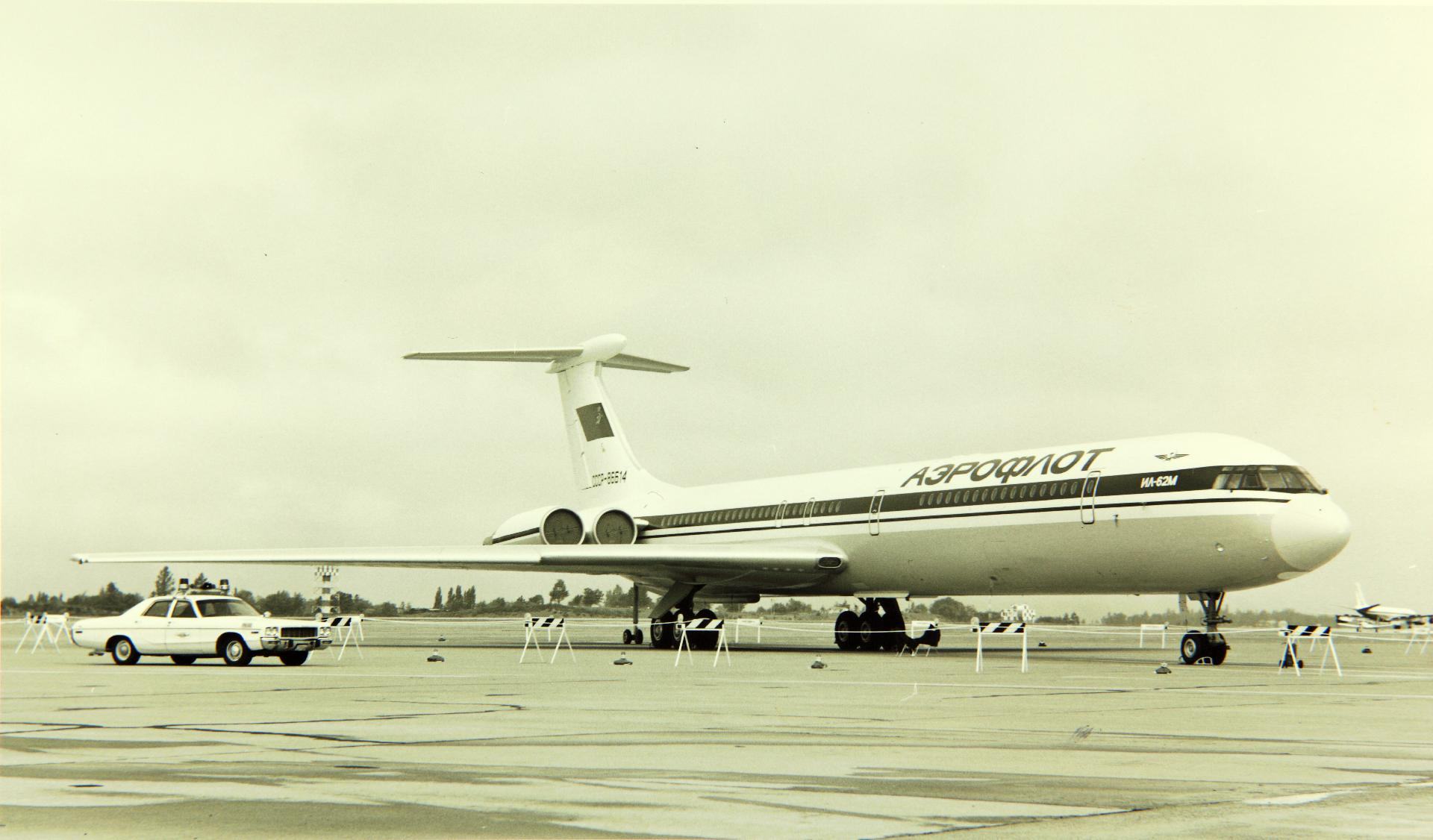
- СССР-86614, the aircraft involved in the accident

Accident
- Date: 27 May 1977
- Summary: Controlled flight into terrain, pilot error aggravated by bad weather
- Site: Off José Martí International Airport; 22°59′21″N 82°24′33″W

Aircraft
- Aircraft type: Ilyushin Il-62M
- Operator: Aeroflot
- Registration: СССР-86614
- Flight origin: Sheremetyevo International Airport
- Stopover: Frankfurt Airport
- Last stopover: Lisbon Airport
- Destination: José Martí International Airport
- Occupants: 69
- Passengers: 59
- Crew: 10
- Fatalities: 67
- Injuries: 2
- Survivors: 2

Aeroflot Flight 331 was an international passenger flight operated by an Ilyushin Il-62M that crashed about 1 km (0.62 mi) from José Martí International Airport, in Havana, Cuba, on 27 May 1977. The accident occurred after the aircraft hit power lines on its final approach to the airport during poor weather. The aircraft was attempting an emergency landing due to a fire in one of its engines. Only two of the 69 occupants on board survived. The cause of the crash was ruled to be pilot error.

== Aircraft ==
The aircraft involved was an Ilyushin Il-62M, registered as CCCP-86614 and operated by the International Civil Aviation Directorate of Aeroflot. At the time of the accident, the aircraft had 5,549 hours of flight and 1,144 use cycles. The aircraft was delivered to Aeroflot in 1975.

== Passengers and crew ==
At a stopover in Lisbon, Portugal, a new crew took command of the aircraft. The five-man crew consisted of Captain Viktor Orlov, Co-pilot Vasily Shevelev, Navigator Anatoly Vorobyov, Flight Engineer Yuri Suslov, and Radio Operator Evgeniy Pankov. Five flight attendants were on the aircraft.

Nationality	Passengers	Crew	Total
Soviet Union	28	10	38
United Kingdom	12	0	12
Cuba	8	0	8
Sweden	3	0	3
Australia	2	0	2
Guinea-Bissau	2	0	2
West Germany	2	0	2
Mexico	1	0	1
Netherlands	1	0	1
Total	59	10	69

== Sequence of events ==
At 03:32 UTC, Flight 331 took off from Lisbon Airport and climbed to 35,000 feet (11,000 m). While on approach to Havana, the crew reported seeing false altitude and air pressure readings. They were then granted permission to descend from 35,000 to 15,000 feet (10,700 to 4,600 m), followed by a descent to 3,000 feet (910 m). At the time, cumulus clouds were present, visibility was 8 kilometres (5.0 mi; 4.3 nmi) with a dense fog at 40 metres (130 ft), atmospheric pressure was 758 mmHg (0.997 atm), and the temperature was 21 °C (70 °F). At 8:45:28 (12:45:28 UTC) local time, still 1,270 metres (1.27 km; 0.79 mi) from the runway, the crew spotted four power lines 28-metre (92 ft) high, and attempted to avoid them by pitching the nose up. However, at 23–25 metres (75–82 ft), they clipped all four lines, slicing the stabilizer and severing the right outboard wing flaps. The damage caused the aircraft to make a sharp 70° bank to the right over the next three seconds. The aircraft then struck the ground with its right wing and nose and caught fire, destroying it. Only the tail section remained.

The only two survivors of the crash were a West German woman and a Soviet man. One of the victims was José Carlos Schwarz, a poet and musician from Guinea-Bissau.

== Investigation ==
An investigation revealed serious errors made by the crew in the last moments of the flight. The main cause of the accident was a blatant violation of approach procedure, errors in calculating altitude that resulted in incorrect altitude readings that led to a premature descent, and the crew's attempt at a visual approach in dense fog. Also cited was the incorrect use of the radio altimeter by the crew.

== See also ==
- Aeroflot accidents and incidents in the 1970s
