= Casino Lisboa =

Casino Lisboa may refer to:

- Casino Lisboa (Macau)
- Casino Lisboa (Portugal)
