= Canal de Bolama =

Strait in the coast of Guinea-Bissau

- Location in Guinea-Bissau
- Coordinates: 11.4833°N 15.6167°W
- Ocean/sea sources: Atlantic Ocean
- Basin countries: Guinea Bissau
- Max. length: 14 km (8.7 mi)
- Max. width: 7 km (4.3 mi)
- Islands: Galinhas Island

Canal de Bolama is a strait off the coast of Guinea-Bissau on the Atlantic Ocean.

== Geography ==
The Canal de Bolama runs from NW to SE and is located to the east of the Bissagos Islands, separating Galinhas, at the eastern end of the group, from Bolama, the easternmost island close to the mainland.
