= Carache =

Island in Guinea-Bissau

Orangozinho
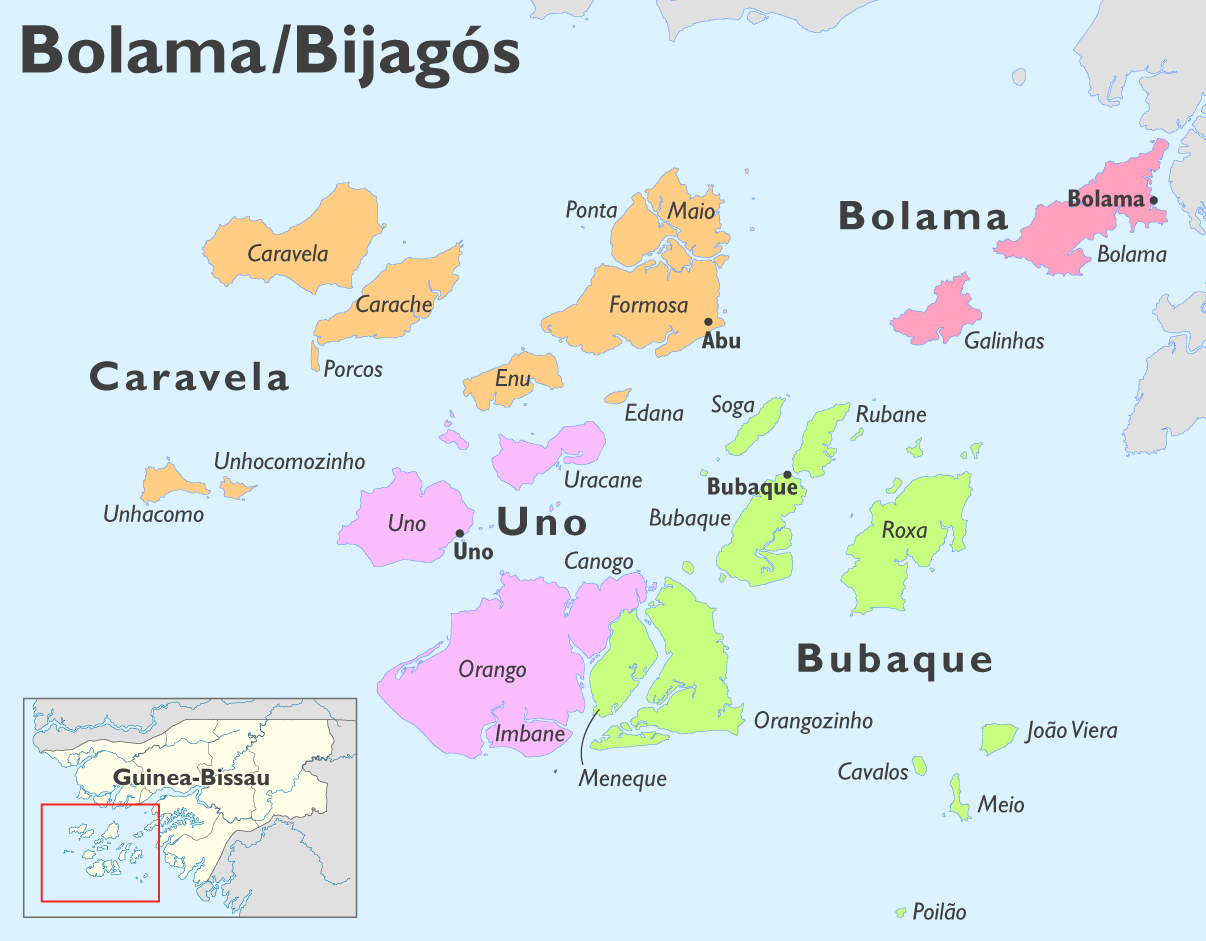
- Carache in the Caravela Sector, shown on the top left
- Interactive map of Orangozinho

Geography
- Location: Atlantic Ocean
- Coordinates: 11.47°N 16.24°W
- Archipelago: Bijagós Archipelago
- Area: 80.4 km^{2} (31.0 sq mi)
- Length: 18.7 km (11.62 mi)
- Width: 7.3 km (4.54 mi)

Administration
- Guinea-Bissau
- Region: Bolama

Demographics
- Population: 428 (2009)

Carache is an island in the northwestern part of the Bissagos Islands group, Guinea-Bissau. It belongs to the Bolama Region and the sector of Caravela. Its area is 80.4 km^{2}. The island is 18.7 km long and up to 7.3 km wide. It is separated from the island of Caravela by a narrow channel. The largest villages on the island are Binte and Ampintcha. Its population is 428 (2009 census).
