= Caió (Guinea-Bissau) =

Sector of the Cacheu Region in Guinea-Bissau

- Sector
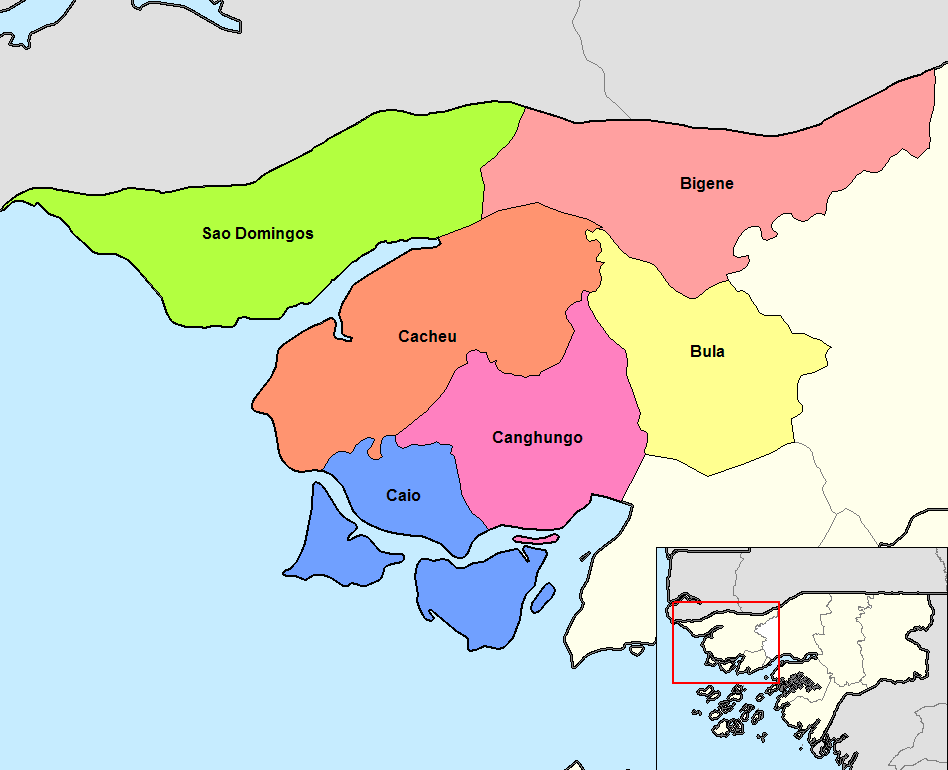
- A map showing the sectors of Guinea-Bissau; Caió is on the bottom in blue.
- Interactive map of Caió
- Coordinates: 11°55′40″N 16°12′10″W
- Country: Guinea-Bissau
- Region: Cacheu

Population (2009)
  - Total: 12,696
- Time zone: UTC+0:00 (GMT)

Caió is a sector in the Cacheu Region of Guinea-Bissau. Its population is 12,696 (2009 census). The islands Pecixe and Jeta are part of the sector.

== Climate ==
Caió has a tropical savanna climate (Aw) with little to no rainfall from November to May and heavy to very heavy rainfall from June to October.

Climate data for Caió
Month	Jan	Feb	Mar	Apr	May	Jun	Jul	Aug	Sep	Oct	Nov	Dec	Year
Mean daily maximum °C (°F)	31.8 (89.2)	33.3 (91.9)	34.4 (93.9)	34.4 (93.9)	33.5 (92.3)	31.8 (89.2)	29.9 (85.8)	29.2 (84.6)	30.2 (86.4)	31.4 (88.5)	32.1 (89.8)	31.1 (88.0)	31.9 (89.5)
Daily mean °C (°F)	24.3 (75.7)	25.5 (77.9)	26.7 (80.1)	27.4 (81.3)	27.7 (81.9)	27.4 (81.3)	26.5 (79.7)	26.0 (78.8)	26.5 (79.7)	27.0 (80.6)	26.8 (80.2)	24.6 (76.3)	26.4 (79.5)
Mean daily minimum °C (°F)	16.8 (62.2)	17.8 (64.0)	19.1 (66.4)	20.4 (68.7)	22.0 (71.6)	23.0 (73.4)	23.1 (73.6)	22.8 (73.0)	22.8 (73.0)	22.7 (72.9)	21.6 (70.9)	18.2 (64.8)	20.9 (69.5)
Average rainfall mm (inches)	0 (0)	0 (0)	0 (0)	0 (0)	10 (0.4)	143 (5.6)	536 (21.1)	660 (26.0)	404 (15.9)	184 (7.2)	28 (1.1)	3 (0.1)	1,968 (77.4)
Source: Climate-Data.org
