= Orango National Park =

Protected area in Guinea-Bissau

Coordinates: 11.12°N 16.05°W

- IUCN category II (national park)
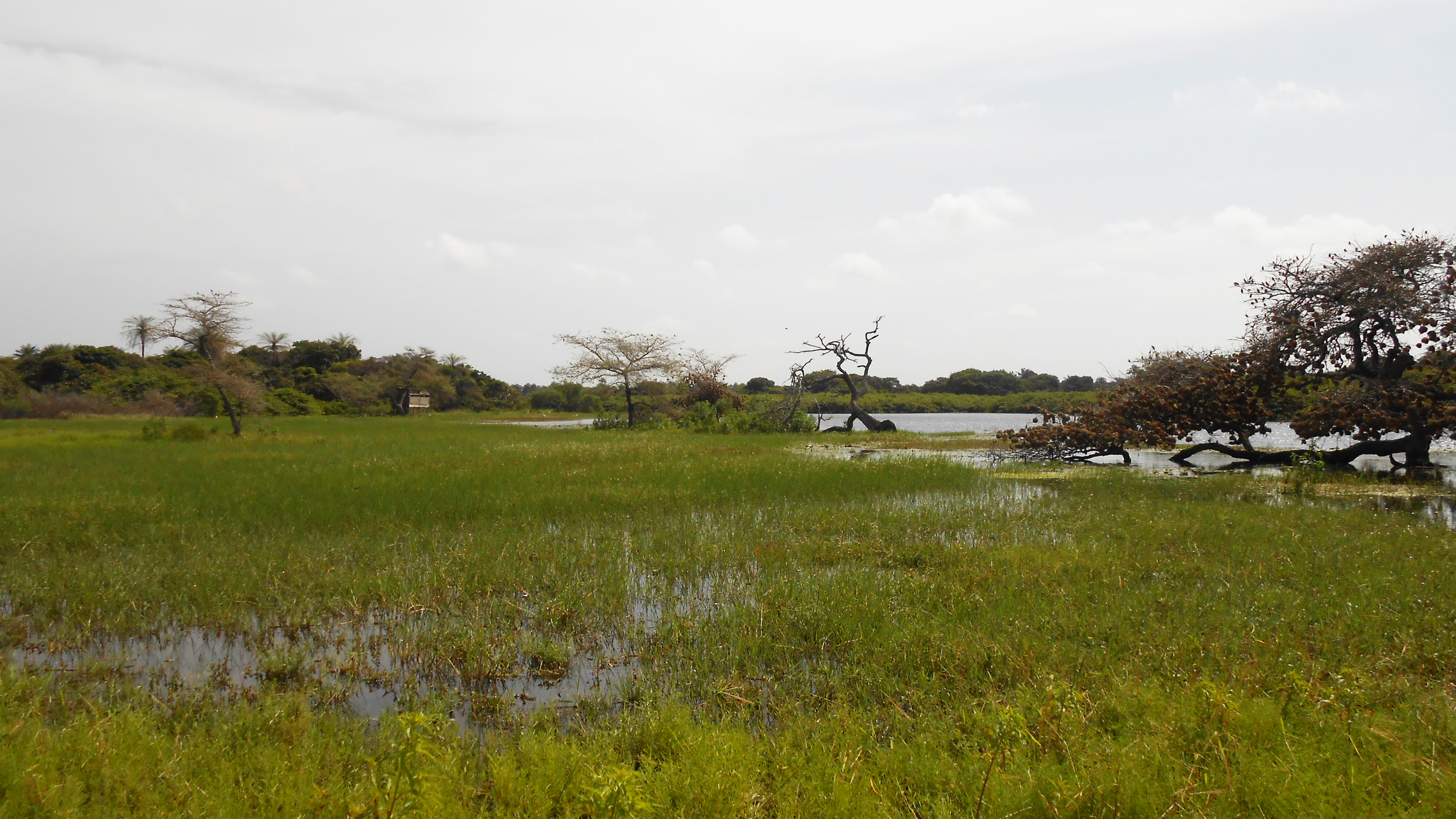
- A section of Orango Island with wetlands including swamps mangroves and the rainforest
- Interactive map of Orango National Park
- Area: 1,582 km^{2} (611 sq mi)
- Created: 1 December 2000

The Orango National Park (Portuguese: Parque Nacional de Orango) is a protected area in Guinea-Bissau. It was established in December 2000. The park has an area of 1,582 km^{2} (611 sq mi), which is partly marine. It covers the southern part of the Bissagos Archipelago, notably the islands Orango, Orangozinho, Meneque, Canogo and Imbone, and the surrounding sea. The marine area does not exceed 30 m (100 ft) in depth. The park is administered by Instituto da Biodiversidade e das Áreas Protegidas da Guiné-Bissau (Biodiversity Institute and Protected Areas of Guinea-Bissau). About 160 km^{2} (60 sq mi) of the park is covered by mangroves. The mangroves play a crucial role for the reproduction of molluscs, fish and sea turtles.

On the mainland, palm trees (Elaeis guineensis) are most noticeable, as well as savanna shrubs and sandy shores. It is also the main habitat of the African gray parrot (Psittacus erithacus) which is an otherwise endangered species in the subregion.
