= Caravela =

Island in Guinea-Bissau

Coordinates: 11°34′N 16°16′W

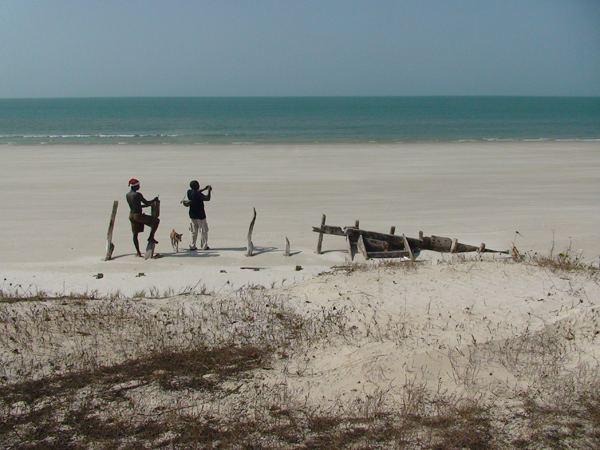
Caravela's sandy beach

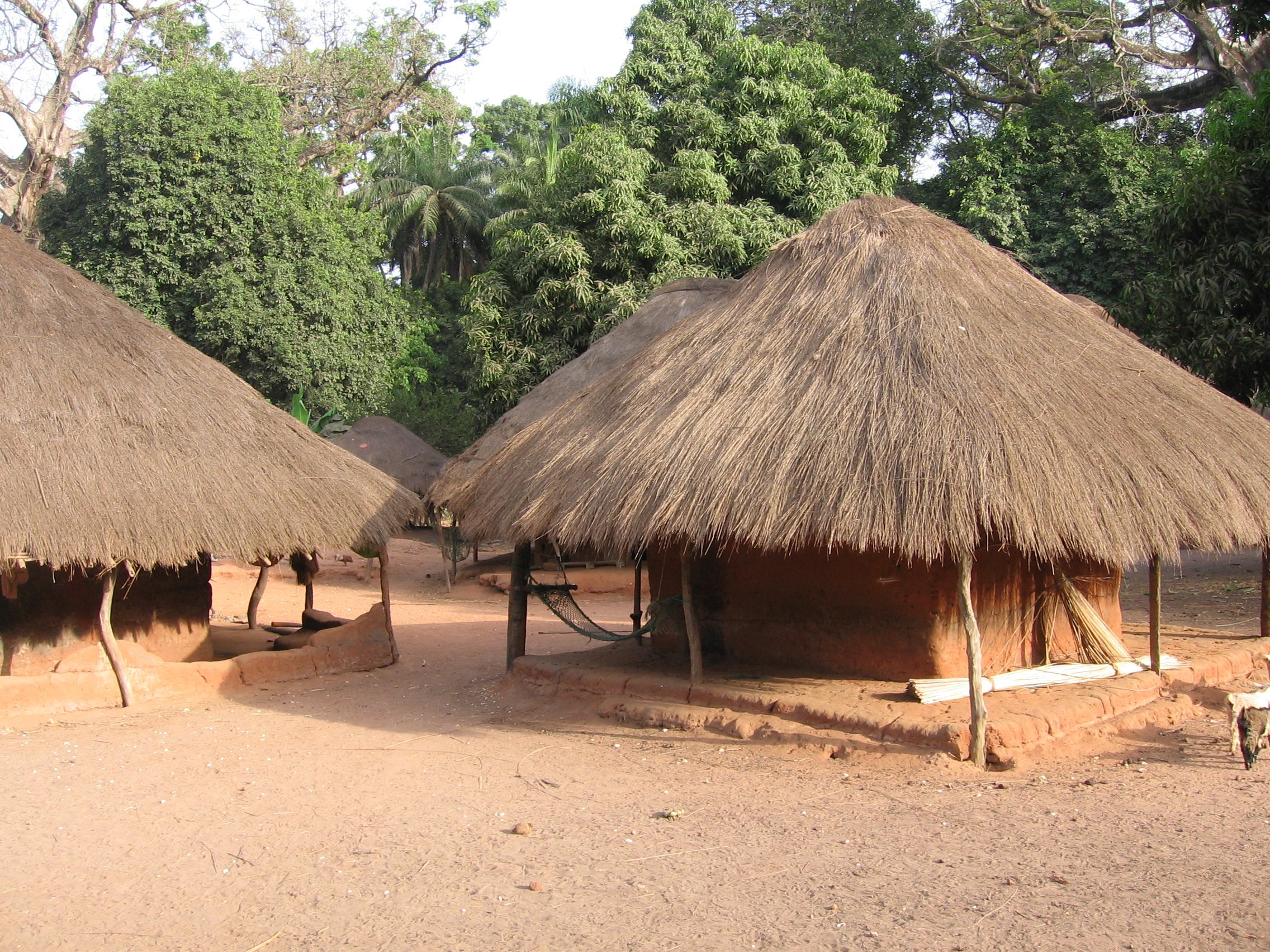
Traditional houses in Caravela

Caravela is the northernmost island of the Bissagos Islands of Guinea-Bissau, part of the Sector of Caravela, which also includes the islands Carache, Maio, Ponta and Formosa. The population of the sector is 4,263, the population of the island is 907 (2009 census). The area of the island is 128 km^{2}, its length is 19.3 km and its maximum width is 10 km. The island is heavily forested with mangroves. It has white, sandy beaches. Caravela has a small airfield. The island Carache lies to its southeast.
