= Lagoas Cufada Natural Park =

National park in Guinea-Bissau

Coordinates: 11.71006°N 15.07942°W

Lagoas de Cufada Natural Park
- IUCN category II (national park)
- Interactive map of Lagoas de Cufada Natural Park

Ramsar Wetland
- Official name: Lagoa de Cufada
- Designated: 14 May 1990
- Reference no.: 469

The Lagoas de Cufada Natural Park (Portuguese: Parque Natural das Lagoas de Cufada) is a national park in Guinea-Bissau. It was established on 1 December 2000. It covers an area of 890 km^{2}. It was the first protected area in Guinea-Bissau. It was designated a Ramsar Wetland on 14 May 1990.

== Wildlife ==
Chimpanzees are reported to live in the park, making nests in oil palms, but details are lacking about the density and size of the population within the protected area. Other animals found in the park include hippopotamus, waterbuck, roan antelope, kob, bay duiker, African buffalo, king colobus, western red colobus, leopard, hyenas, African manatee and dwarf crocodile. The park has been designated an Important Bird Area (IBA) by BirdLife International.
