= Formosa (Guinea-Bissau) =

- Location within Guinea-Bissau

Geography
- Coordinates: 11°29′N 15°58′W
- Archipelago: Bissagos Islands
- Area: 140 km^{2} (54 sq mi)

Administration
- Guinea-Bissau
- Region: Bolama

Demographics
- Population: 1,873 (2009)

Formosa is an island in the Bissagos Islands, Guinea-Bissau, part of the sector of Caravela. Its area is 140 km^{2}, its length is 19.9 km and it is 10 km across at its widest. It forms practically one island with Ponta and Maio, separated by creeks. The island has a population of 1,873 (2009 census); the largest village is Abú.
