= Roxa =

Roxa (Canhabaque)
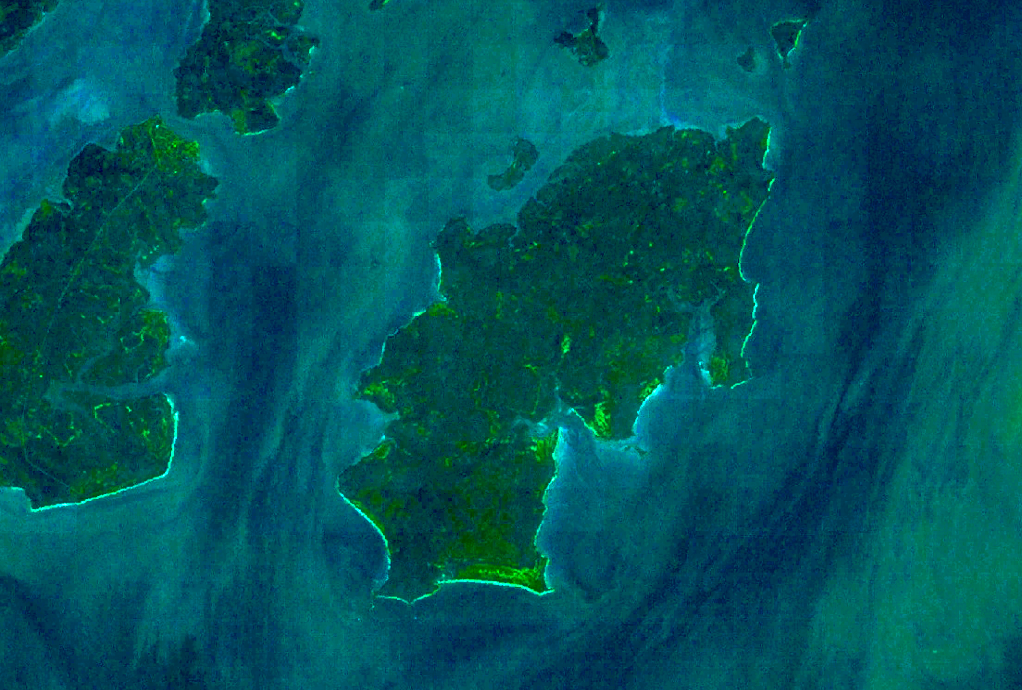
- Satellite view

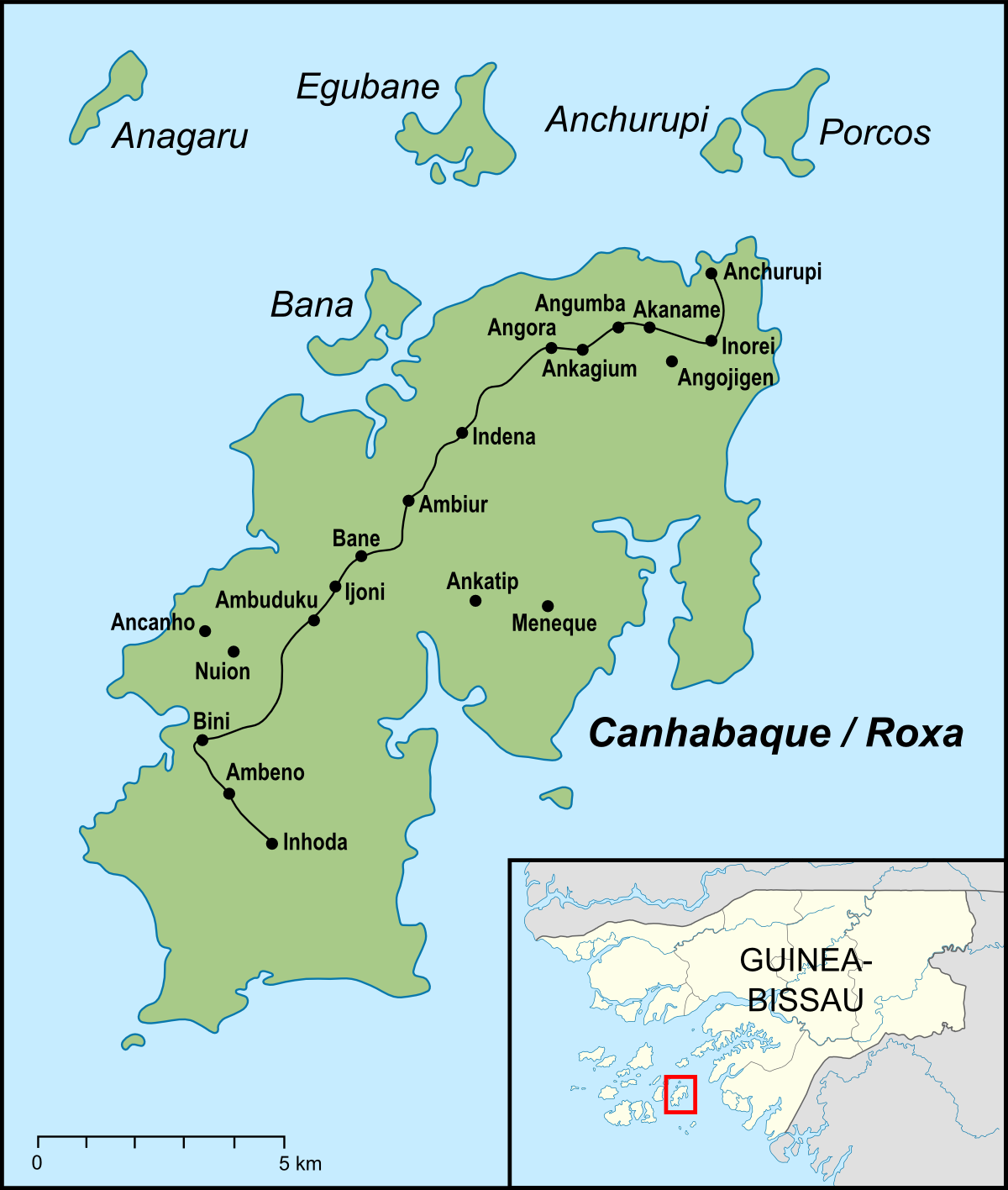

- Location within Guinea-Bissau

Geography
- Location: Atlantic Ocean
- Coordinates: 11.24441°N 15.72349°W
- Archipelago: Bissagos Islands
- Area: 111 km^{2} (43 sq mi)
- Length: 20 km (12 mi)
- Width: 11 km (6.8 mi)

Administration
- Guinea-Bissau

Demographics
- Population: 2,478 (2009)

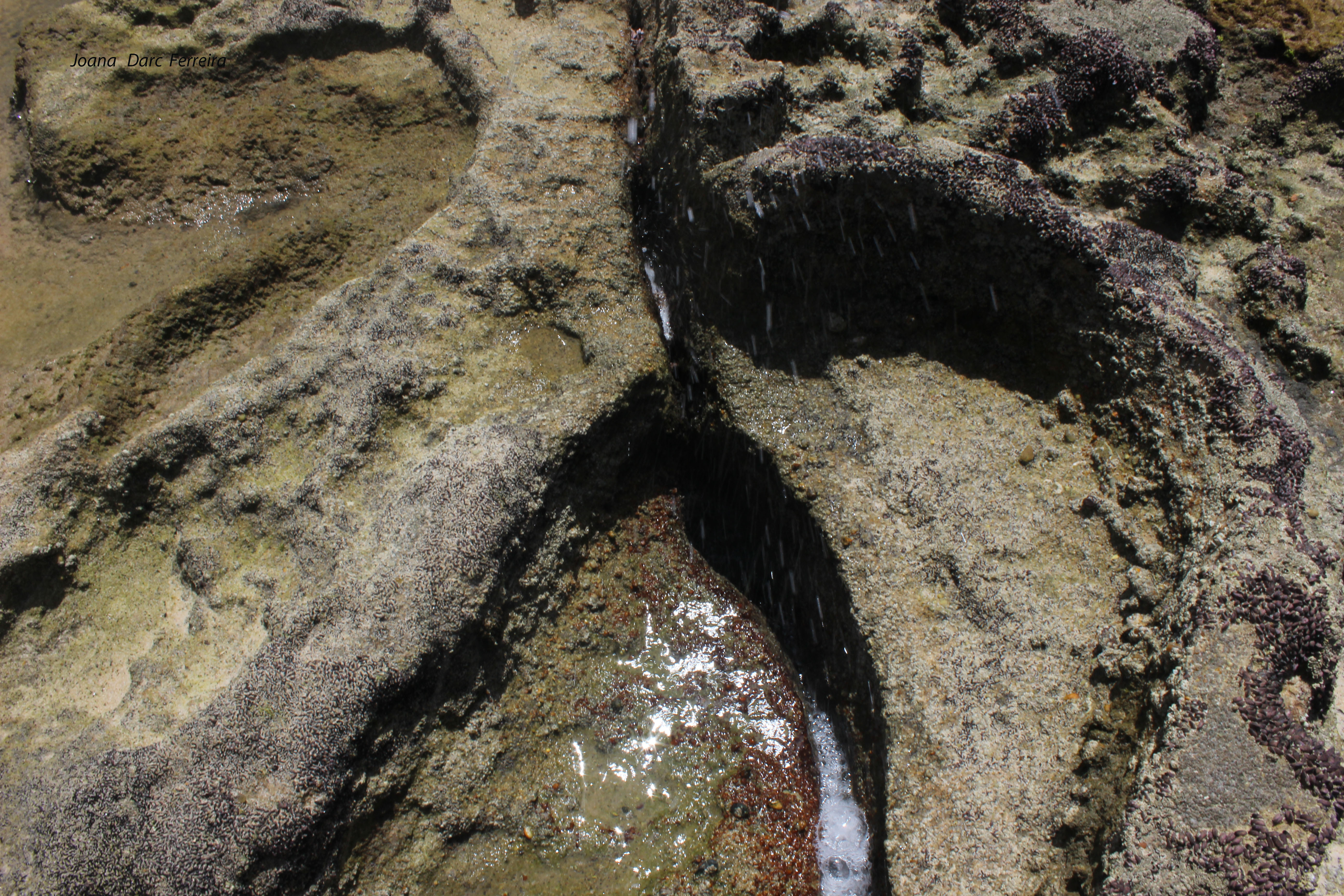

Roxa or Canhabaque is an island in the Bissagos Islands, Guinea-Bissau. It is part of the Bolama Region and Bubaque sector. Its area is 111 square kilometres (43 sq mi); it is 20 kilometres (12 mi) long and 11 kilometres (6.8 mi) wide. The island has a population of 2,478 (2009 census), divided among the villages Ambuduco, Ampucute, Ancanhozinho, Indenazinho, Ancaguine, Ancatipe, Angaura, Indena Grande, Ga-Cote, Inore, Ambena, Bine, Inhoda, Idjoue, Eboco, Meneque, Ancanam, Anghudjiga, Anghumba and Antchurupe. There is a lighthouse on the east side of the island, its focal height is 26 m (85 ft).
