= Bubaque =

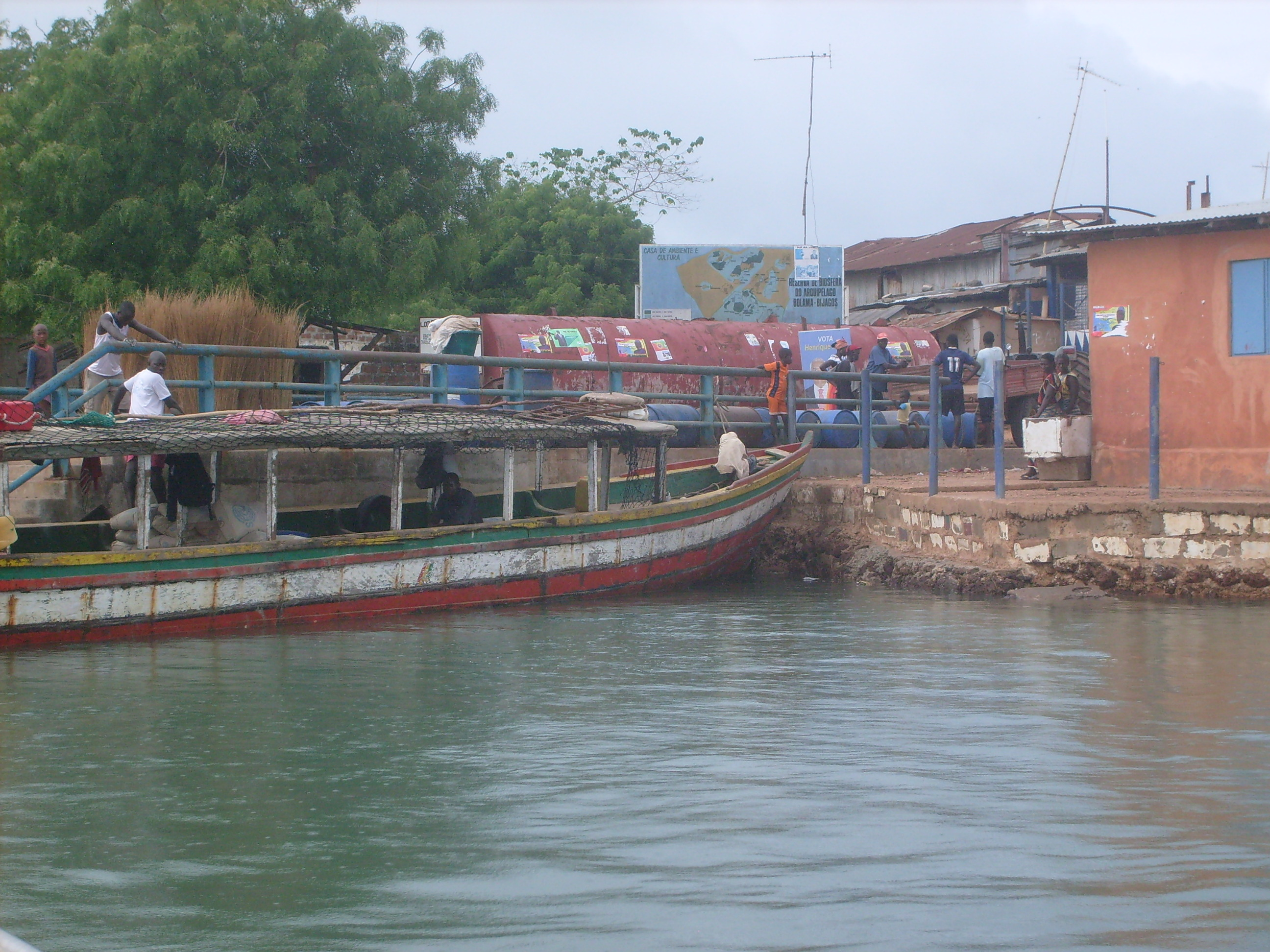
- Port area of Bubaque

- Location in Guinea-Bissau
- Coordinates: 11°17′N 15°50′W
- Country: Guinea-Bissau
- Region: Bolama Region
- Sector: Bubaque

Area
  - Land: 73 km^{2} (28 sq mi)

Population (2009)
  - Total: 6,427
- Time zone: UTC(UTC-0) (GMT)

Bubaque is one of the Bijagós Islands in Guinea-Bissau, and is also the name of its main town. The island has a population of 6,427, while the town of Bubaque has a population of 4,299 (2009 census). The area of the island is 75 km^{2}, it is 13.6 km long and 8 km wide. Administratively, it is part of Bubaque sector, Bolama Region.

The island is known for its wildlife and is heavily forested. It is also where the UNESCO nature reserve headquarters is situated, as well as a museum.

== Transportation ==
Bubaque Airport serves the island. A weekly ferry runs to Bissau from Bubaque's port. All transportation on the island itself is done by motorbike or on foot.

== Notable people ==
- Stefanie Gercke (b. 1941), German-South African writer
- Juvêncio Gomes (b. 1944), fighter for the PAIGC and later mayor of Bissau

== Gallery ==
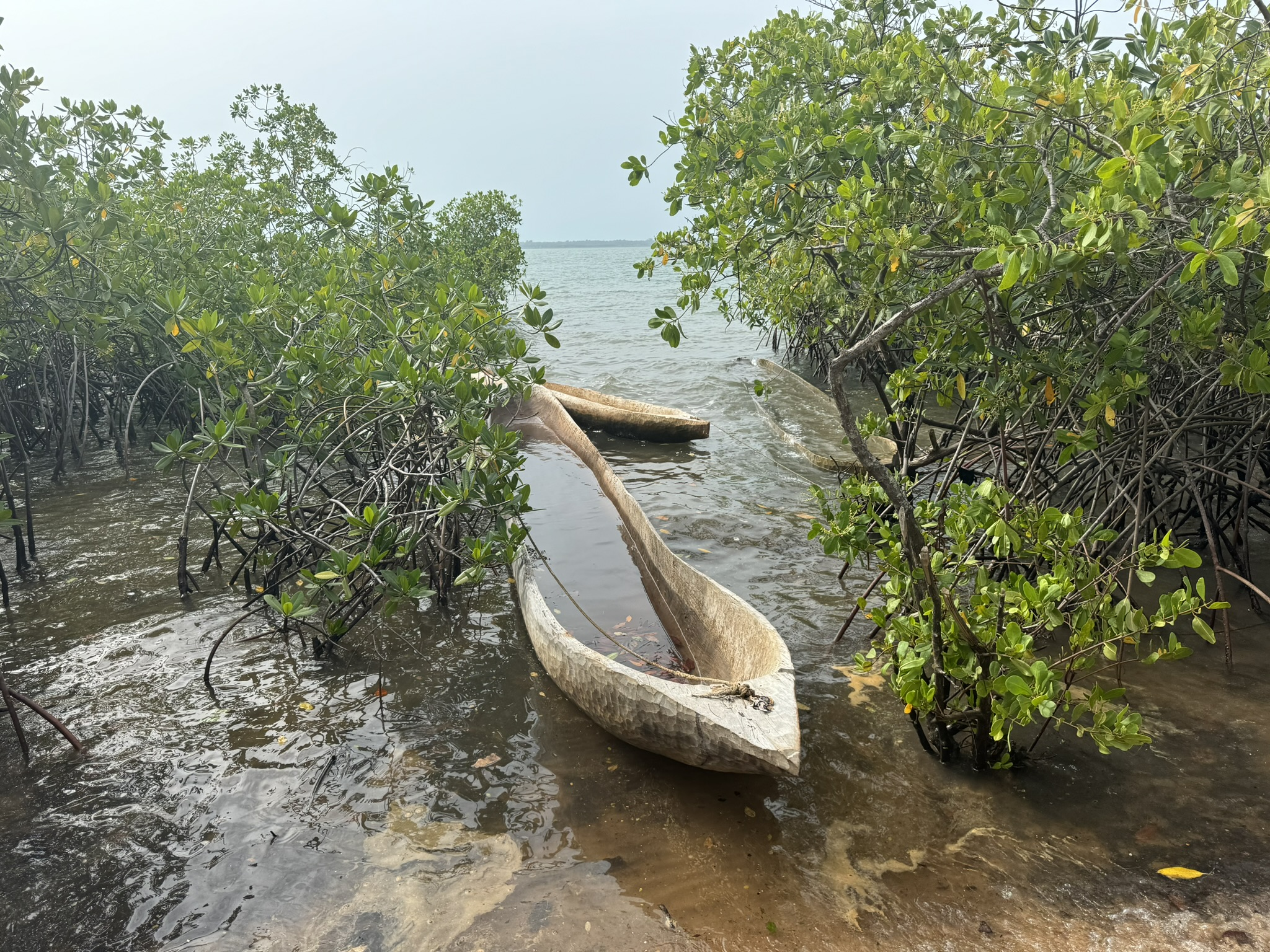
Dugout canoes in mangroves, Bubaque

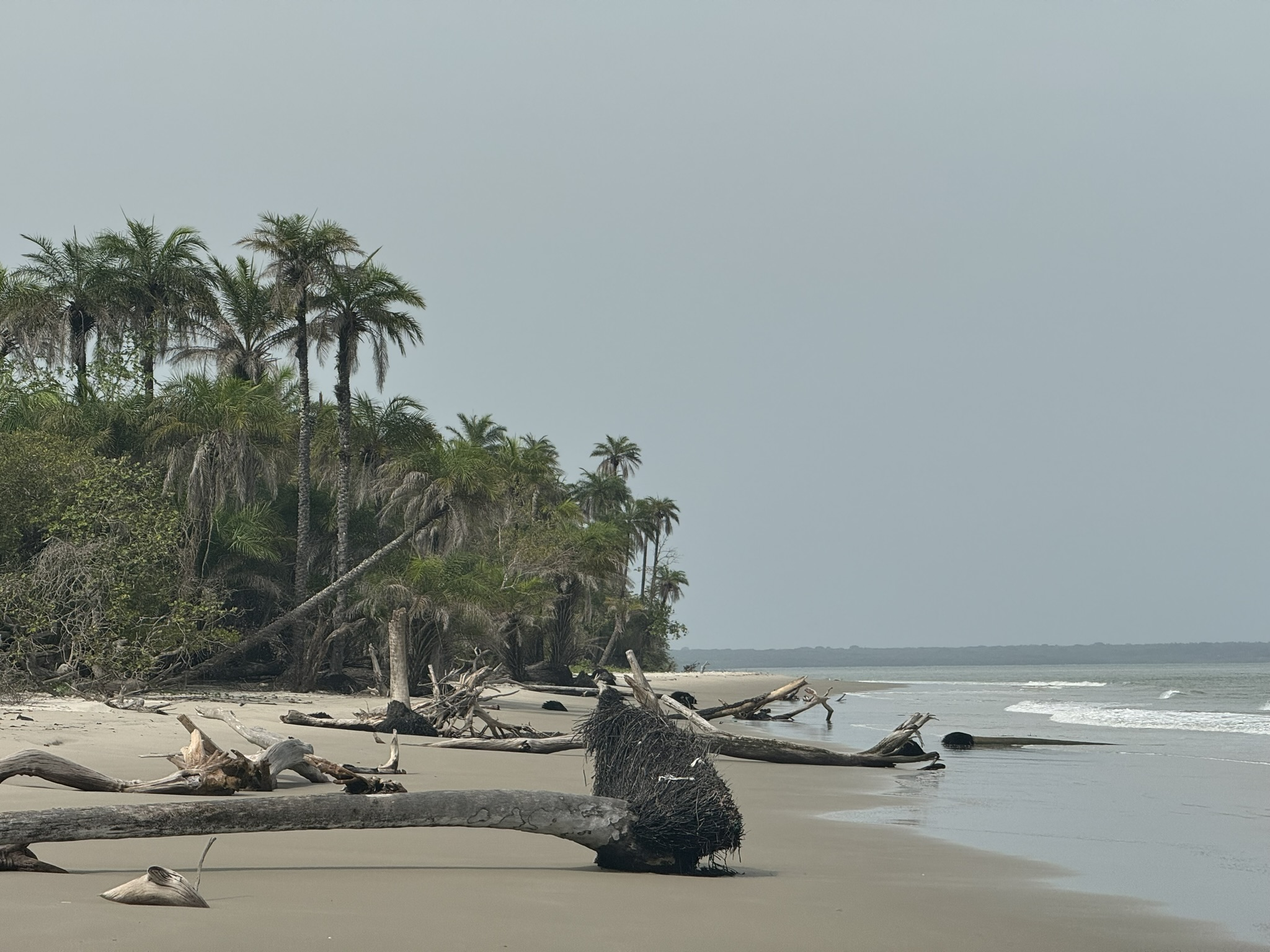
Praia de Bruce (Bruce Beach)
