= List of airports in Guinea-Bissau =

This is a list of airports in Guinea-Bissau, sorted by location.

== List ==
Location	ICAO	IATA	Airport name	Coordinates
Bafatá	GGBF		Bafatá Airport	12°10′35″N 14°39′30″W
Bissau	GGOV	OXB	Osvaldo Vieiro International Airport	11°53′41″N 15°39′13″W
Bubaque	GGBU	BQE	Bubaque Airport	11°17′N 15°50′W
Cufar	GGCF		Cufar Airport	11°17′17″N 15°10′50″W
Gabú	GGGB		Nova Lamego Airport	12°17′30″N 14°14′10″W
Quebo			Quebo Airport	11°32′15″N 14°45′45″W

== See also ==
- Transport in Guinea-Bissau
- List of airports by ICAO code: G#GG - Guinea-Bissau
- Wikipedia: WikiProject Aviation/Airline destination lists: Africa#Guinea-Bissau
