= Víctor Luís Quematcha =

Bissau-Guinean Catholic prelate (born 1967)

The Most Reverend Víctor Luís Quematcha O.F.M.
- Bishop of Bissau, Guinea-Bissau
- Church: Catholic Church
- Archdiocese: Immediately Subject to the Holy See
- See: Diocese of Bissau
- Appointed: 7 November 2026
- Installed: 15 November 2025
- Predecessor: José Lampra Cà (10 December 2021 - 7 November 2026)
- Successor: Incumbent

Orders
- Ordination: 2 May 1998
- Consecration: 28 June 2025 by Waldemar Stanisław Sommertag
- Rank: Bishop

Personal details
- Born: Víctor Luís Quematcha; 27 April 1967 (age 59) Cúmura, Diocese of Bissau, Guinea-Bissau
- Motto: "Sois todos Irmãos" (You are all brothers)

Styles of Víctor Luís Quematcha
- Reference style: Your Lordship; The Most Reverend
- Spoken style: His Lordship
- Religious style: Bishop

Víctor Luís Quematcha O.F.M. (born 27 April 1967) is a Bissau-Guinean Catholic prelate who was appointed Bishop of the Roman Catholic Diocese of Bissau, in Guinea-Bissau on 7 November 2026. Before that, he served as the Bishop of the Roman Catholic Diocese of Bafatá, in Guinea-Bissau from 8 March 2025 until 7 November 2026. Prior to that, from 2 May 1998 until 8 March 2025, he was a priest of the Order of Friars Minor. He was consecrated and installed at Bafatá, Diocese of Bafatá, on 28 June 2025 by Waldemar Stanisław Sommertag, Titular Archbishop of Traiectum ad Mosam. His installation at Bissau is scheduled on 15 November 2026.

== Background and education ==
He was born on 27 April 1967 in Cúmura, Bissau, in Guinea Bissau. He studied philosophy at the Don Bosco Higher Institute of Philosophy and Human Sciences, in Lomé, Togo. He then studied theology at the Anyama Major Seminary in Abidjan, Ivory Coast. Later, he graduated with a Licentiate in moral theology from the Pontifical Alphonsian Academy in Rome in 2006, having studied there since 2004.

== Priesthood ==
In 1997 he took his perpetual vows as a member of the Order of Friars Minor at Brá, Guinea-Bissau. He was ordained a priest of the same Catholic religious Order on 2 May 1998 in Nhoma, Guinea Bissau. He served as a priest until 8 March 2025. While a priest, he served in various roles and locations, including:

- Deputy master of novices in Dapaong, Togo from 1997 until 2000
- Rector of the Brá Minor Seminary in Brá, Guinea Bissau from 2000 until 2004.
- Studies in Rome, Italy at the Pontifical Alphonsian Academy, a component of the Pontifical Lateran University, leading to the award of a licentiate in moral theology from 2004 until 2006.
- Master of temporary professed in Brá, Guinea Bissau from 2007 until 2009.
- Custodian of the Custody of Saint Francis of Assisi for Guinea Bissau from 2009 until 2018.
- Parish priest of the Nossa Senhora da Candelária de Bissau Cathedral from 2014 until 2020.
- Director of the Mal-de-Hansen Hospital in Cúmura, Guinea Bissau from 2017 until 2021.
- Definitor general of the Franciscan Order of Friars Minor for Africa from 2021 until 2025.

== As bishop ==
On 8 March 2025, Pope Francis appointed him as bishop of the Roman Catholic Diocese of Bafatá, Guinea-Bissau, a diocese "immediately Subject to the Holy See". He succeeded the late Bishop Carlos Pedro Zilli, who died of COVID-19 while in office on 31 March 2021.

Bishop Víctor Luís Quematcha was consecrated bishop and installed at Bafatá, Guinea-Bissau on 28 June 2025. The Principal Consecrator was Waldemar Stanisław Sommertag, Titular Archbishop of Traiectum ad Mosam assisted by José Câmnate na Bissign, Bishop Emeritus of Bissau and António Montes Moreira, Bishop Emeritus of Bragança-Miranda.

On 7 November 2026, Pope Leo XIV accepted the health-related resignation of Bishop José Lampra Cà from the pastoral care of the Catholic Diocese of Bissau. That same day, the Holy Father appointed Bishop Víctor Luís Quematcha previously the local ordinary at Bafatá, to succeed at Bissau. He was installed at Bissau of 15 November 2026.

== See also ==
- Catholic Church in Guinea-Bissau

== Succession table ==
Catholic Church titles
Preceded by José Lampra Cà (10 December 2021 - 7 November 2026)	Bishop of Bissau (since 7 November 2026)	Succeeded by Incumbent
Preceded by Carlos Pedro Zilli (13 March 2001 - 31 March 2021)	Bishop of Bafatá (8 March 2025 - 7 November 2026)	Succeeded by Vacant
