= Bissau Cathedral =

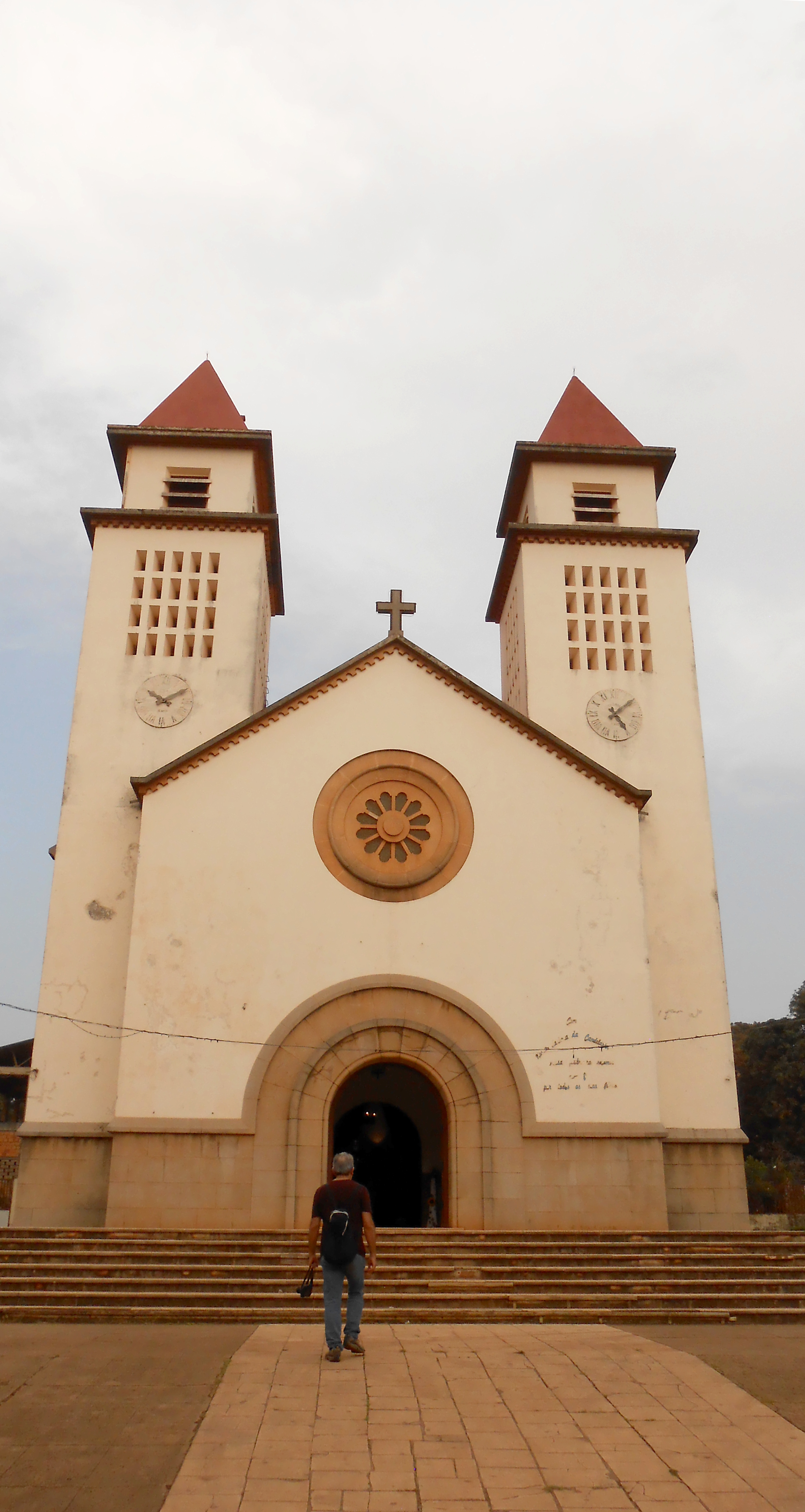
- Bissau Cathedral
- 11°51′36″N 15°34′52″W
- Location: Bissau, Guinea-Bissau
- Denomination: Catholic Church
- Sui iuris church: Latin Church
- Tradition: Roman Rite

History
- Status: Cathedral
- Consecrated: 1954

Architecture
- Functional status: Active
- Architect(s): João Simões, Galhardo Zilhão
- Style: Modern Neo-romantic
- Groundbreaking: 1945
- Completed: 1950

Administration
- Province: Immediately subject to the Holy See
- Diocese: Bissau

Clergy
- Bishop: José Lampra Cà

Bissau Cathedral (Portuguese: Catedral de Bissau), also known as Sé Catedral de Nossa Senhora da Candelária (Cathedral of Our Lady of Candelaria) is a Catholic cathedral in Bissau, Guinea-Bissau. It is the centre of the Catholic Church in Guinea-Bissau. The cathedral is the seat of Diocese of Bissau, which was created in 1977. Situated in the downtown area of Bissau, it is noted for its function as a lighthouse. Services are held in Portuguese.

== History ==
The original church was built in medieval architectural style in 1935. Built in the same location, the current cathedral replaced the original church. The architects of the current cathedral were João Simões and Galhardo Zilhão. Construction began in 1945 and was completed in 1950. Later renovation is attributed to the architect Lucínio Cruz. The cathedral has hosted numerous inauguration ceremonies. It was visited on 27 January 1990 by Pope John Paul II. On 9 August 1998, Bishop Settimio Ferrazzetta gave a prominent speech at the cathedral, in which he denounced violence in the country; he was buried in the cathedral upon his death, the following year.

== Architecture and fittings ==
The building, set slightly away from the avenue, is square in form. Its architectural style is characterized as "modernized neo-romantic." The cathedral is noted for its function as a lighthouse, with the light installed on its 36 metres (118 ft) high north tower. It has a steady green light (fl. 2s, ec . 7s) and is operational. The light guides ships through the Geba River estuary to the Port of Bissau. It is maintained by the Capitania dos Portos, Serviços de Marinha.
