= List of companies of Guinea-Bissau =

Location of Guinea-Bissau

Guinea-Bissau, officially the Republic of Guinea-Bissau, is a country in West Africa. It is bordered by Senegal to the north and Guinea to the south and east, with the Atlantic Ocean to its west.

Guinea-Bissau is among the world's least developed nations and one of the 10 poorest countries in the world, and depends mainly on agriculture and fishing. Guinea-Bissau has started to show some economic advances after a pact of stability was signed by the main political parties of the country, leading to an IMF-backed structural reform program. The key challenges for the country in the period ahead would be to achieve fiscal discipline, rebuild public administration, improve the economic climate for private investment, and promote economic diversification.

After several years of economic downturn and political instability, in 1997, Guinea-Bissau entered the CFA franc monetary system, bringing about some internal monetary stability. The civil war that took place in 1998 and 1999 and a military coup in September 2003 again disrupted economic activity, leaving a substantial part of the economic and social infrastructure in ruins and intensifying the already widespread poverty. Following the parliamentary elections in March 2004 and presidential elections in July 2005, the country is trying to recover from the long period of instability despite a still-fragile political situation.

== Notable firms ==
This list includes notable companies with primary headquarters located in the country. The industry and sector follow the Industry Classification Benchmark taxonomy. Organizations which have ceased operations are included and noted as defunct.

Notable companies Status: P=Private, S=State; A=Active, D=Defunct
Name	Industry	Sector	Headquarters	Founded	Notes	Status	
Air Bissau	Consumer services	Airlines	Bissau	1960	Airline, defunct 1998	P	D
Correios da Guiné-Bissau	Industrials	Delivery services	Bissau	?	Postal services	S	A
Electricidade e Aguas da Guine-Bissau	Utilities	Multiutilities	Bissau	?	Electricity, water	S	A
Guine Bissau Airlines	Consumer services	Airlines	Bissau	2010	Airline	P	D

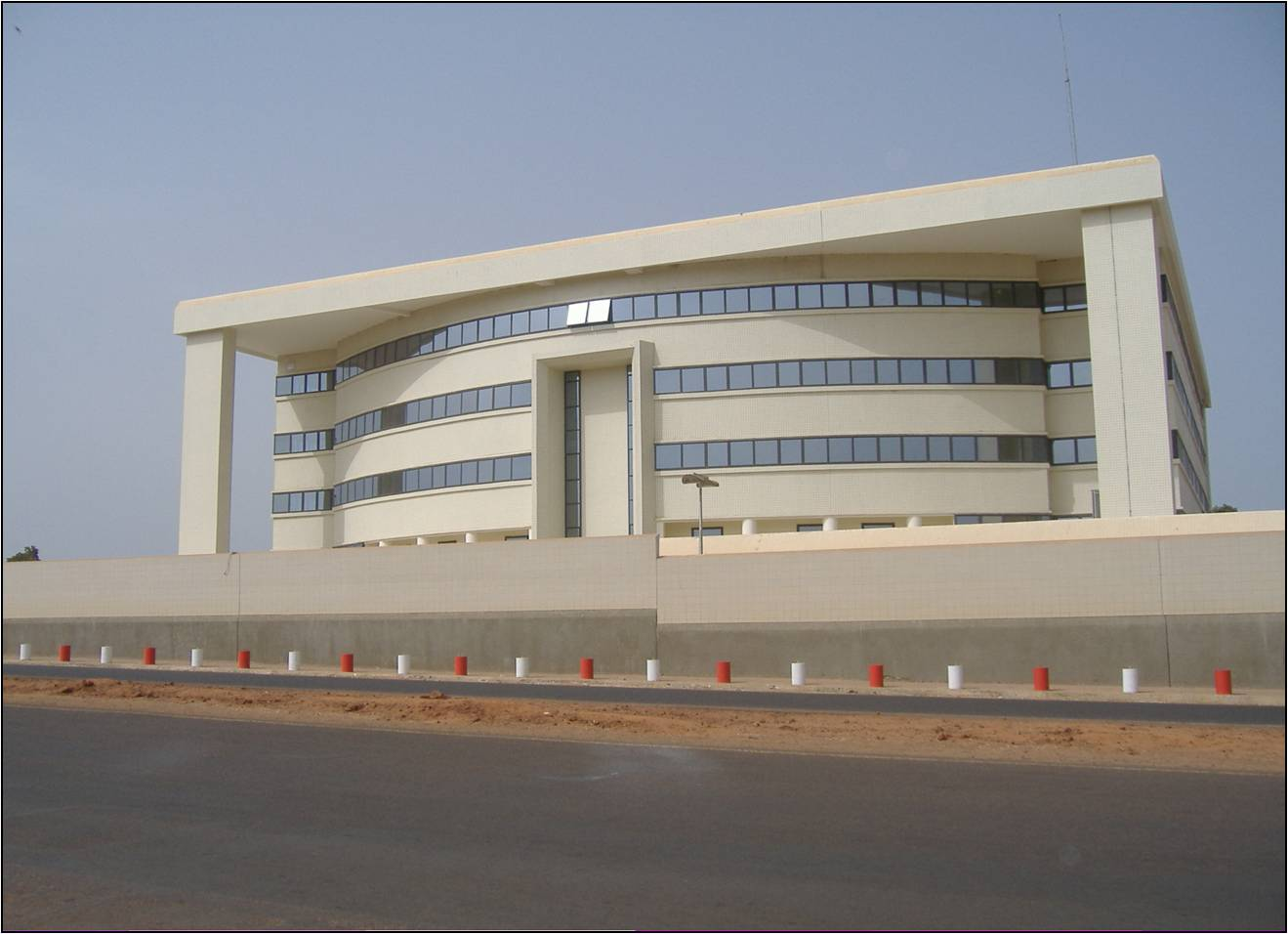
The Central Bank of Guinea-Bissau in Bissau

== See also ==
- Economy of Guinea-Bissau
- List of banks in Guinea-Bissau
