= Lamego (disambiguation) =

Lamego is a city in Viseu District, Portugal.

Lamego may also refer to:

- Lamego (surname)
- S.C. Lamego, football club in Lamego, Portugal
- Castle of Lamego, castle in Lamego, Portugal
- Diocese of Lamego, Latin Church diocese in Portugal
- Nova Lamego Airport, airport in Gabú, Guinea-Bissau
- Estádio Municipal João Lamego Netto, multi-sports stadium in Ipatinga, Brazil
