= José Lampra Cà =

Catholic bishop emeritus of Bissau, Guinea-Bissau

The Most Reverend José Lampra Cà
- Bishop Emeritus of Bissau, Guinea-Bissau
- Church: Roman Catholic Church
- Diocese: Bissau
- See: Bissau
- In office: 29 January 2022 - 7 November 2026
- Predecessor: José Câmnate na Bissign
- Other posts: Auxiliary Bishop of Bissau (2011–2021), Apostolic Administrator of Bissau (2020–2022)

Orders
- Ordination: 27 December 1997 by Settimio Ferrazzetta
- Consecration: 12 November 2011 by José Câmnate na Bissign

Personal details
- Born: José Lampra Cà; 5 January 1964 (age 62) Blom, Biombo Region, Guinea-Bissau
- Motto: Procurai Primeiro O Reino De Deus E A Sua Justiça ("Seek first the kingdom of God and His righteousness")

José Lampra Cà (born 5 January 1964) is a Bissau-Guinean cleric who was the Roman Catholic Bishop of Bissau, in Guinea-Bissau from 10 December 2021 until his resignation on 7 November 2026. Lampra Cà received his holy priestly orders on 27 December 1997 by the then-Bishop of Bissau, Settimio Ferrazzetta OFM.

On 13 May 2011, he was named by Pope Benedict XVI to be the auxiliary bishop of Bissau and as the titular bishop of Lemta. The Bishop of Bissau, D. José Câmnate na Bissign, consecrated him on 12 November; co-consecrators included Carlos Pedro Zilli PIME, the Bishop of Bafatá, and Luis Mariano Montemayor, the Apostolic Nuncio of Senegal, Cape Verde and Guinea-Bissau and Apostolic Delegate of Mauritania.

On 11 July 2020, Lampra Cà also became the Apostolic Administrator for the vacancy as Bishop of Bissau after Câmnate na Bissign resigned.

Pope Francis named Lampra Cà to become the Bishop of Bissau on 10 December 2021. He assumed the position on 29 January 2022.

On 7 November 2026, Pope Leo XIV accepted the health-related resignation of Bishop José Lampra Cà from the pastoral care of the Catholic Diocese of Bissau. That same day, the Holy Father appointed Bishop Víctor Luís Quematcha, previously of the Diocese of Bafatá to succeed at Bissau.
