= Bafatá Airport =

Airport in Guinea-Bissau

- IATA: none; ICAO: GGBF

Summary
- Airport type: Public
- Serves: Bafatá
- Elevation AMSL: 165 ft / 50 m
- Coordinates: 12°10′35″N 14°39′30″W

Map

Runways
Direction	Length		Surface
Direction	m	ft	Surface
08/26	1,100	3,609	Unpaved
- Source: Google Maps GCM

Bafatá Airport (ICAO: GGBF) is an airport serving Bafatá in Guinea-Bissau. The dirt runway doubles as an avenue named Av. Brasil and may have vehicular traffic.

== See also ==
- Transport in Guinea-Bissau
- List of airports in Guinea-Bissau
