= BQE (disambiguation) =

BQE or bqe may stand for:

- Brooklyn–Queens Expressway
- The BQE (soundtrack)
- ISO 639-3 code Navarro-Lapurdian dialect.
- IATA code Bubaque Airport
