= Quebo Airport =

Airport in Aldeia Formosa, Guinea-Bissau

- IATA: none; ICAO: none; LID: GG64

Summary
- Airport type: Public
- Serves: Quebo
- Location: Aldeia Formosa
- Elevation AMSL: 165 ft / 50 m
- Coordinates: 11°32′15″N 14°45′45″W

Map
- Location in Guinea-Bissau

Runways
Direction	Length		Surface
Direction	m	ft	Surface
14/32	1,200	3,937	Gravel
- Sources: Google Maps Fallingrain OurAirports

Quebo Airport is an airstrip serving the adjacent towns of Quebo and Aldeia in the Tombali Region of Guinea-Bissau. Quebo's national airport code is GG64.

== See also ==
- List of airports in Guinea-Bissau
- Transport in Guinea-Bissau
