= Transport in Guinea-Bissau =

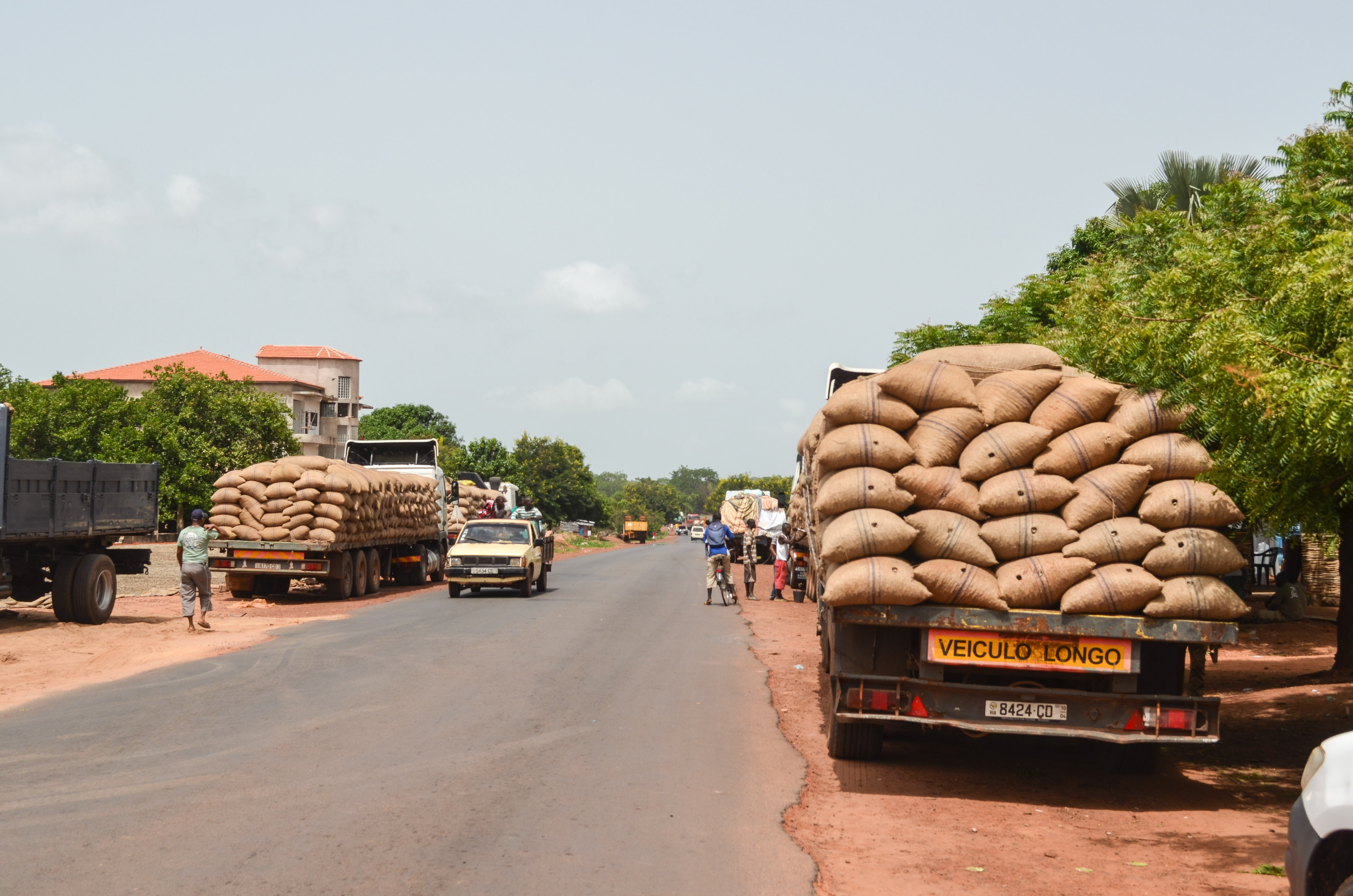
Trucks on a rural road in Guinea-Bissau.

Transport infrastructure in Guinea-Bissau is basic, with most roads outside the capital Bissau being unpaved.

== Railways ==
There are no railways in Guinea-Bissau. At the Port of Bissau, there was a small cargo railway working from the late 19th century into the 1940s.

In 1998 an agreement was signed between Portugal and Guinea-Bissau for construction of a railway to Guinea, but the outbreak of the Guinea-Bissau Civil War in 1998 made these plans impossible.

== Roads ==
- Total: 4,400 km
- Paved: 453 km
- Unpaved: 3,947 km (1996 est.)

The Trans–West African Coastal Highway crosses Guinea-Bissau, connecting it to Banjul (the Gambia), Conakry (Guinea), and eventually to 11 other nations of the Economic Community of West African States (ECOWAS).

== Waterways ==
Several rivers are accessible to coastal shipping in Guinea-Bissau.

== Seaports and harbours ==
- Port of Bissau
- Buba
- Cacheu
- Farim

=== Merchant Marine ===
In 1999 no merchant vessels were operating.

Imports and exports moving by sea require a cargo tracking note (CTN), which must be established immediately after loading. Cargo arriving without a valid note is held at the port of Bissau until the document is produced.

== Airports ==
The main airport serving the country, and the only one with scheduled commercial service, is Osvaldo Vieira International Airport in Bissau.

- 30 (1999 est.)

Paved runways:

- 3 (Osvaldo Vieira International Airport, Cufar Airport, and Bubaque Airport)

Over 3, 047 m:

- 1

1,524 to 2,437 m:

- 1

914 to 1,523 m:

- 1

Unpaved runways:

- 27

1,524 to 2,437 m:

- 1

914 to 1,523 m:

- 4

under 914 m:

- 22 (1999 est.)

== See also ==
- Guinea-Bissau
- Air Bissau
- Guine Bissau Airlines (2002)
- Guine Bissau Airlines
