= Nova Lamego Airport =

Airport in Guinea-Bissau

- IATA: none; ICAO: GGGB

Summary
- Airport type: Public
- Serves: Gabú
- Elevation AMSL: 227 ft / 69 m
- Coordinates: 12°17′30″N 14°14′10″W

Map
- Location in Guinea-Bissau

Runways
Direction	Length		Surface
Direction	m	ft	Surface
15/33	2,000	6,562	Gravel
- Sources: Google Maps OurAirports

Nova Lamego Airport (IATA: GGGB) is an airport serving the city of Gabú, the capital of the Gabú Region of Guinea-Bissau.

== See also ==
- List of airports in Guinea-Bissau
- Transport in Guinea-Bissau
