= Diocese of Bafatá =

Catholic diocese in Guinea-Bissau

Coordinates: 12.1674°N 14.6611°W

Diocese of Bafatá Dioecesis Bafatanus
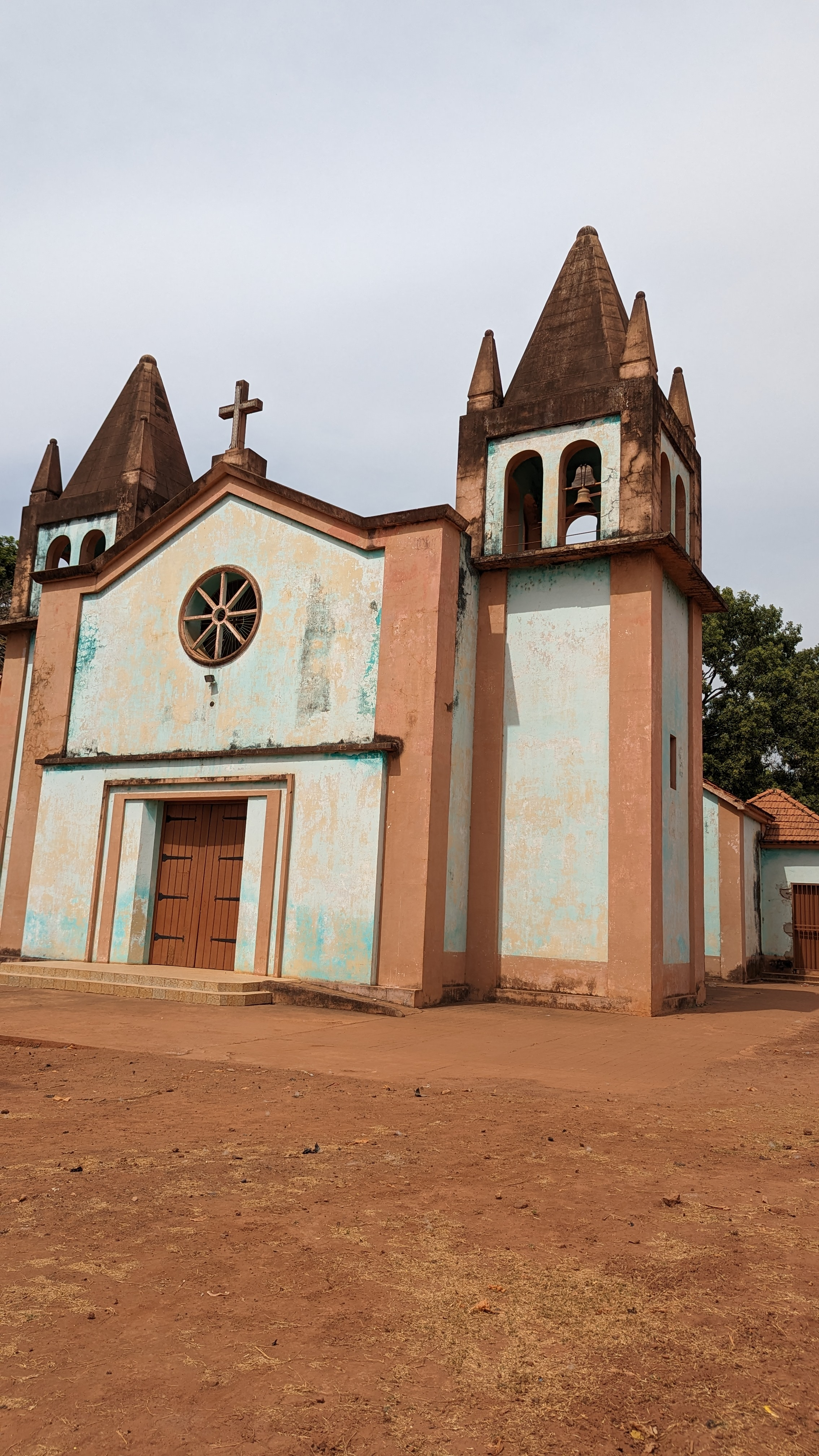

Location
- Country: Guinea-Bissau
- Metropolitan: Immediately subject to the Holy See

Statistics
- Area: 24,635 km^{2} (9,512 sq mi)
- Population: Total; Catholics: (as of 2012); 685,000; 36,400 (5,3%)

Information
- Rite: Latin Rite
- Cathedral: Sé Catedral de Nossa Senhora da Graça, Bafatá

Current leadership
- Pope: Leo XIV
- Bishop: Victor Luís Quematcha

Map
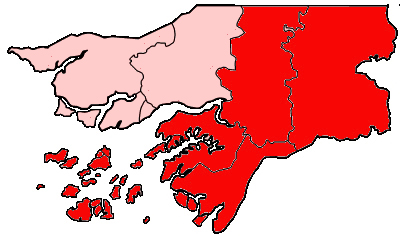

The Roman Catholic Diocese of Bafatá (Latin: Bafatan(us)) is a diocese located in the city of Bafatá in Guinea-Bissau.

== History ==
- March 13, 2001: Established as Diocese of Bafatá from the Diocese of Bissau

== Leadership ==
- Bishops of Bafatá (Roman rite)
  - Carlos Pedro Zilli, P.I.M.E. (13 March 2001 – 31 March 2021)
  - Víctor Luís Quematcha O.F.M. (11 March 2025 – present)

== See also ==
- Roman Catholicism in Guinea-Bissau
- Roman Catholic Diocese of Bissau

== Sources ==
- GCatholic.org
- Catholic Hierarchy
