= Cufar Airport =

Airport in Guinea-Bissau

- IATA: none; ICAO: GGCF

Summary
- Airport type: Public
- Serves: Cufar
- Elevation AMSL: 65 ft / 20 m
- Coordinates: 11°17′20″N 15°10′50″W

Map

Runways
Direction	Length		Surface
Direction	m	ft	Surface
06/24	1,595	5,233	Grass
- Source: Google Maps GCM

Cufar Airport (ICAO: GGCF) is an airport serving Cufar, a village in the Tombali Region of Guinea-Bissau.

== See also ==
- Transport in Guinea-Bissau
- List of airports in Guinea-Bissau
