= Electricidade e Aguas da Guine-Bissau =

Governmental electricity and water company in Guinea Bissau

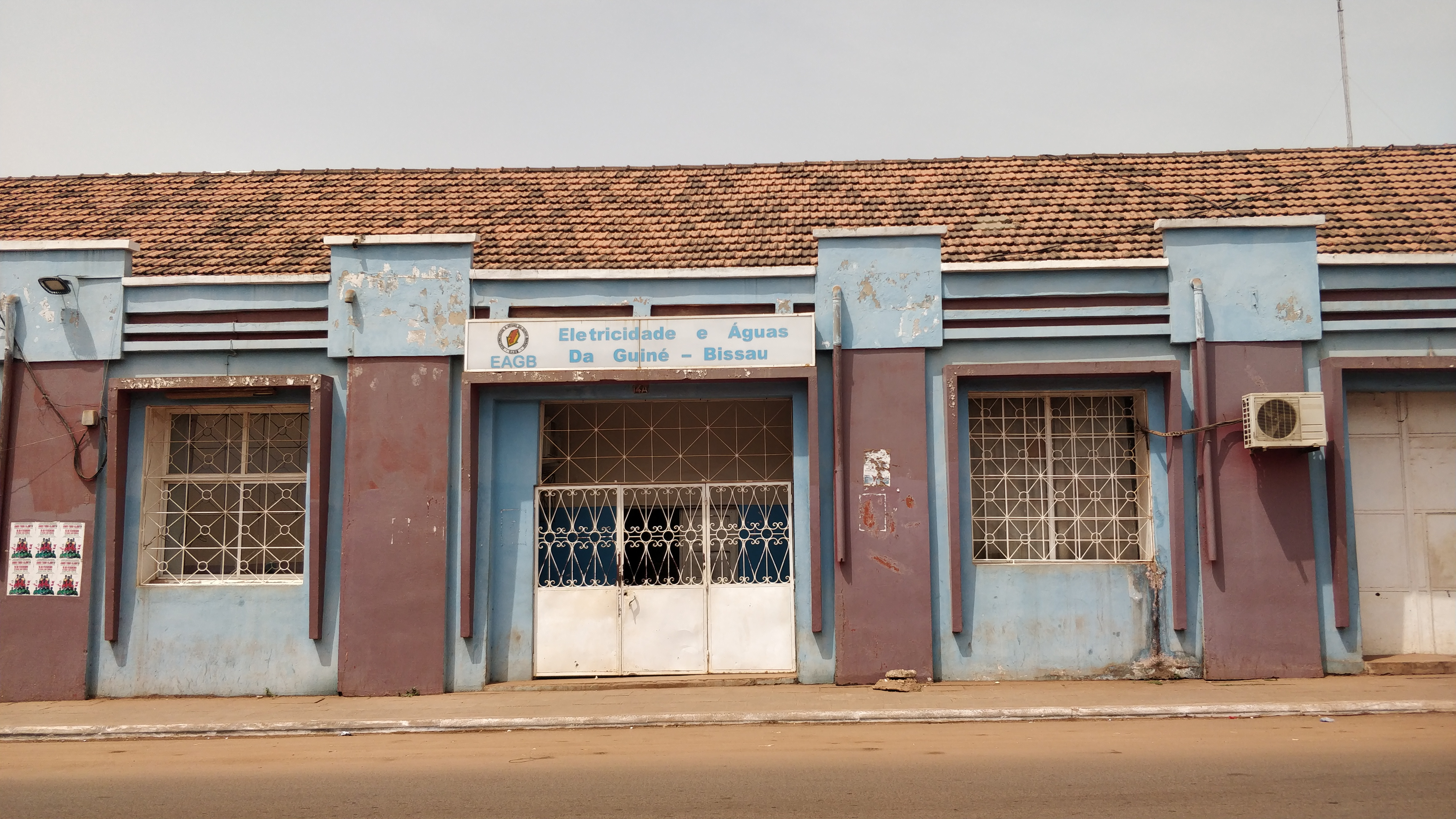
Local seat of the Electricity and Waters company of Guinea-Bissau (Eletricidade e Águas da Guiné-Bissau) in Bissau

Electricidade e Aguas da Guine-Bissau (EAGB) is the national electricity and water company of Guinea Bissau. It is owned by the government and represents the country in the West African Power Pool. Installed electric capacity in 2001 was 1,100 kW; 2007 production was estimated to 65 million kWh, of which 100% came from fossil fuels.

In 2005 EAGB had about 15,300 electricity customers, of which 11,750 were metered and 3,500 non metered, and about 6,300 water customers, of which fewer than 300 were metered.

== See also ==
- List of companies based in Guinea-Bissau
