= Maldives Airways =

Airline in the Maldives

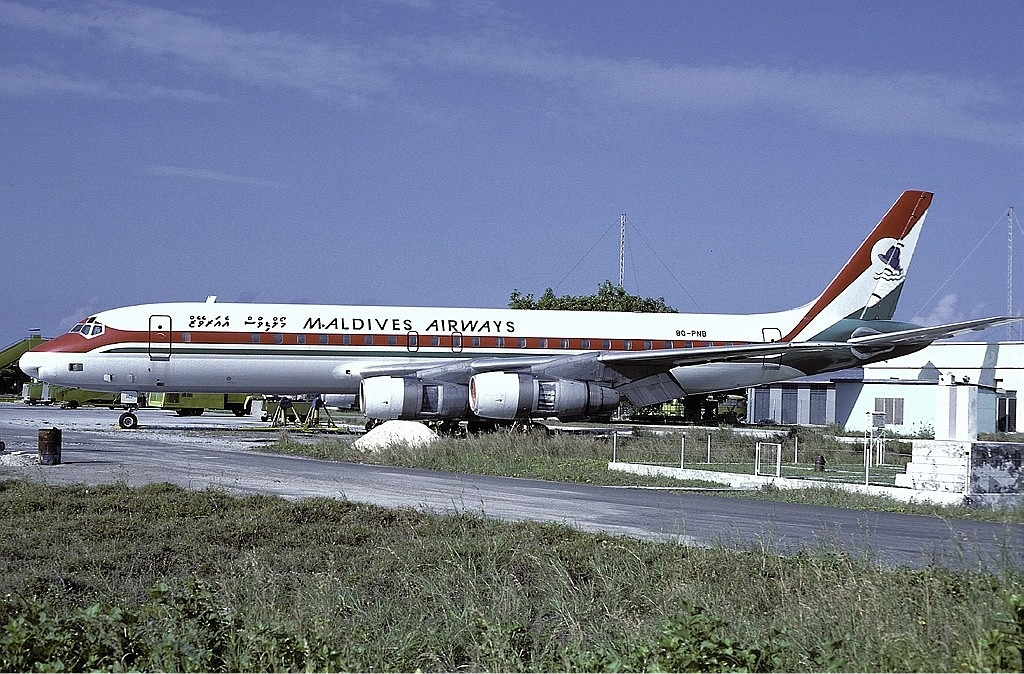
IATA	ICAO	Call sign
MQ	-	Maldives Airways
- Founded: 1984; 42 years ago
- Ceased operations: 1986; 40 years ago
- Hubs: Malé International Airport
- Fleet size: 7
- Destinations: Gan, Colombo, Trivandrum, Madras, Dubai.
- Parent company: Government of Maldives
- Headquarters: Malé, Maldives
- Key people: George Andrews, CEO, Captain Kent Davis DFO/Chief Pilot

Maldives Airways was an airline based in Malé, Maldives. It was operational between 1984 and 1986, offering scheduled passenger flights using a fleet of Four Douglas DC-8 aircraft, and three Fokker F-27 aircraft.

== History ==
Maldives Airways was jointly owned and operated by the PLO. The PLO was a partner in the establishment of this airline of the Maldives and was also the owner of the Transportes Aéreos da Guiné-Bissau airline, then headed by Faiz Zaidan, who later would be charge of civil aviation for the Palestinian Authority. This airline was one of the many companies which also functioned as a screen for the secret activities of the PLO at that time and Maldives Airways planes were engaged in smuggling weapons or drugs for the Palestinian Authority.

The Maldivian authorities allowed this airline to be operated from Maldivian soil without restrictions. But it is not clear whether they were aware of the nature of its operations. The maiden flight of this airline brought a group of local officials and travel agents from Malé to Gan Island in Addu Atoll and back.

The Maldives Airways aircraft could often be seen on the tarmac at Hulhule Airport. Initial routes for the DC-8's were to Colombo, Madras, Trivandrum, and Dubai.

Certain tourist resort operators were alarmed about the PLO having a foothold in the Maldives and the German press echoed those concerns, for the biggest share of tourist arrivals to the Maldives was from Germany. In 1986, the airline went bankrupt. In 1987 the two Maldives Airways DC-8s were sold to Connie Kalitta Services.
