= Bubaque Airport =

Airport in Guinea-Bissau

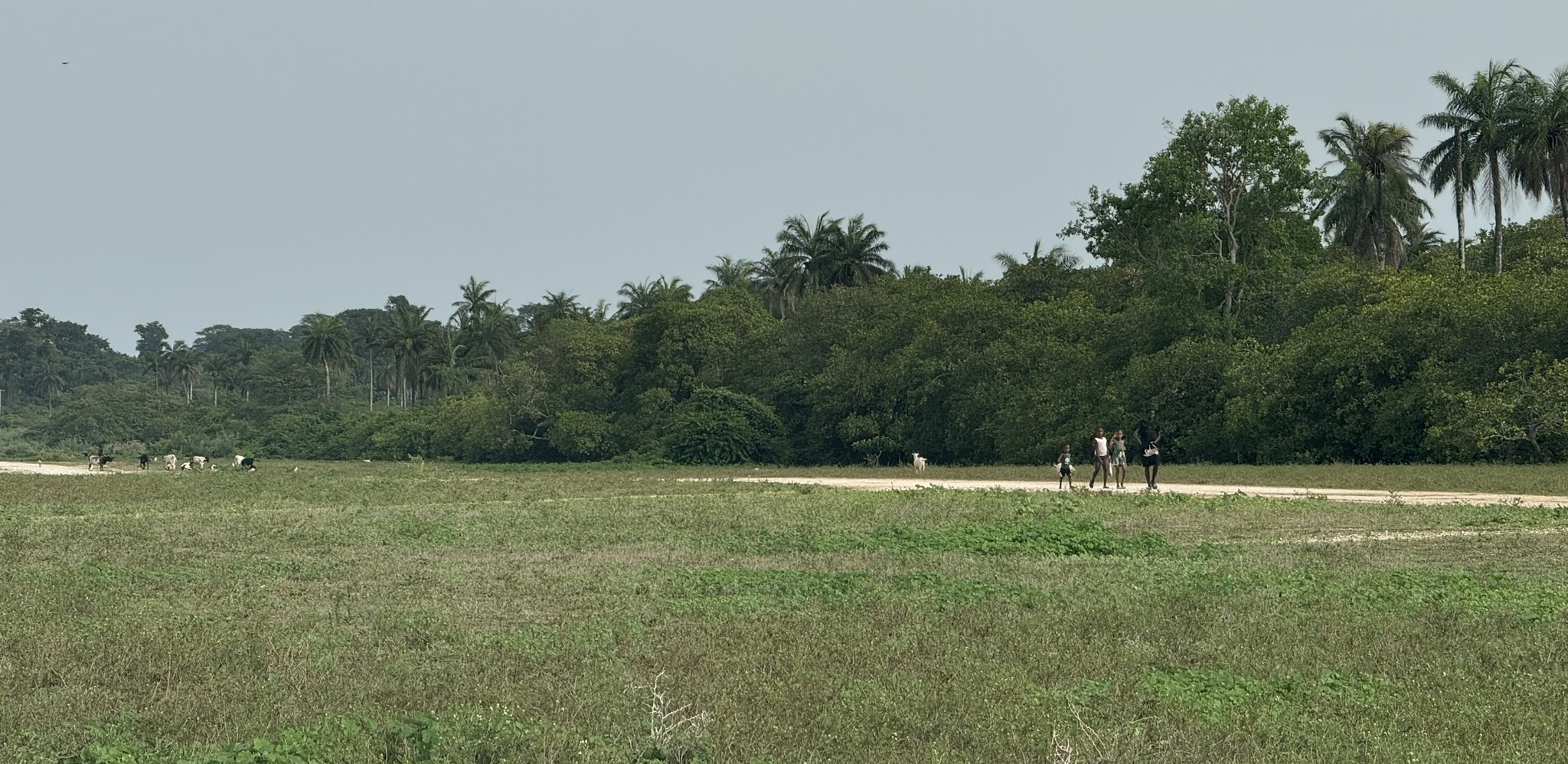
- Unpaved runway of Bubaque Airport, Guinea-Bissau
- IATA: BQE; ICAO: GGBU

Summary
- Airport type: Public
- Serves: Bubaque, Guinea-Bissau
- Elevation AMSL: 80 ft / 24 m
- Coordinates: 11°18′00″N 15°50′20″W

Map
- Location of airport in Guinea-Bissau

Runways
Direction	Length		Surface
Direction	m	ft	Surface
17/35	1,210	3,970	Grass
- Source: Google Maps GCM

Bubaque Airport (IATA: BQE, ICAO: GGBU) is an airport serving the island town of Bubaque, in Guinea-Bissau. It is the Bijagos Archipelago's only airfield.

The airport is on the north end of the island. North approach and departure will be over the water. The 1.2-kilometre (3,900 ft) runway is unpaved.

The airport is located 70 km south of the capital Bissau. It is 22 meters above sea level.

The Bissau VOR-DME (Ident: BIS) is located on the Osvaldo Vieira International Airport at Bissau, 75 kilometres (40 nmi) north-northeast of Bubaque.

== See also ==
- Transport in Guinea-Bissau
- List of airports in Guinea-Bissau
