= Our Lady of Grace Cathedral, Bafatá =

Coordinates: 12.1679°N 14.6613°W

Our Lady of Grace Cathedral
- Sé Catedral de Nossa Senhora da Graça
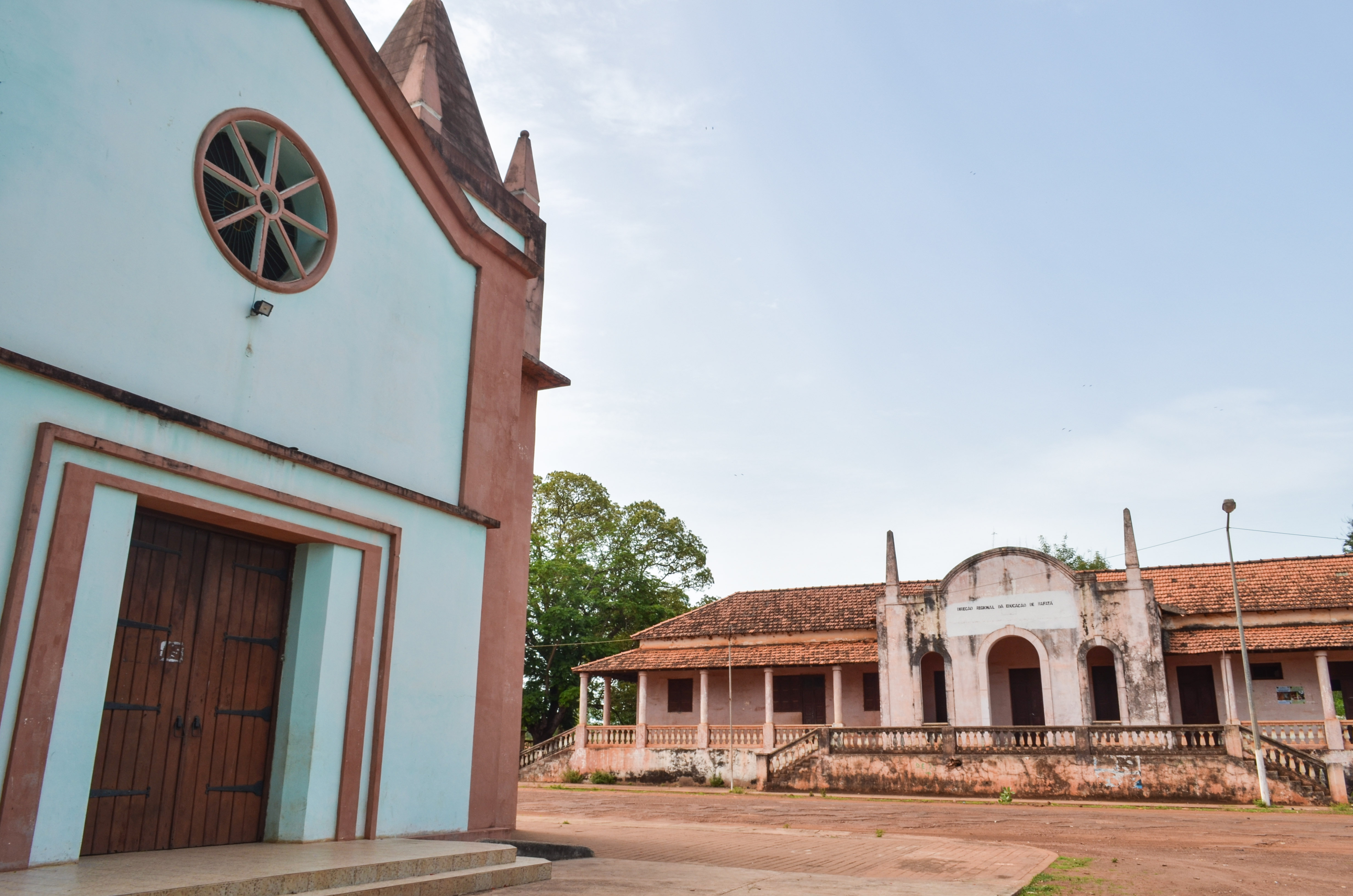
- Our Lady of Grace Cathedral
- Location: Bafatá
- Country: Guinea-Bissau
- Denomination: Roman Catholic Church

The Our Lady of Grace Cathedral (Portuguese: Sé Catedral de Nossa Senhora da Graça) also called Cathedral of Batafá, is a religious building that is affiliated with the Catholic Church and is located in the town of Bafatá in the region of Batafá one of those that make the African country of Guinea-Bissau. This is one of the two cathedrals that exist in that nation, the other of which is dedicated to Our Lady of the Candles found in the capital, Bissau. The building is more than a cathedral; it is more like a parish church in Portuguese colonial style.

The name Our Lady of Grace (Nossa Senhora da Graça) for cathedrals is common in several of the former Portuguese colonies, examples of this Cathedral of Our Lady of Grace in São Tomé and Príncipe and the pro-cathedral of Our Lady of Grace in Cape Verde.

It is a temple that follows the Roman or Latin rite and serves as the seat of the diocese of Batafá (Dioecesis Bafatanus) covering more than half the country and was created in 2001 by the Bull "Cum ad fovendam" by Pope John Paul II.

== See also ==
- Catholic Church in Guinea-Bissau
- Our Lady of Grace Cathedral, São Tomé
