= José Câmnate na Bissign =

Guinea-Bissauan Roman Catholic bishop

The Most Reverend José Câmnate na Bissign
- Bishop emeritus of Bissau
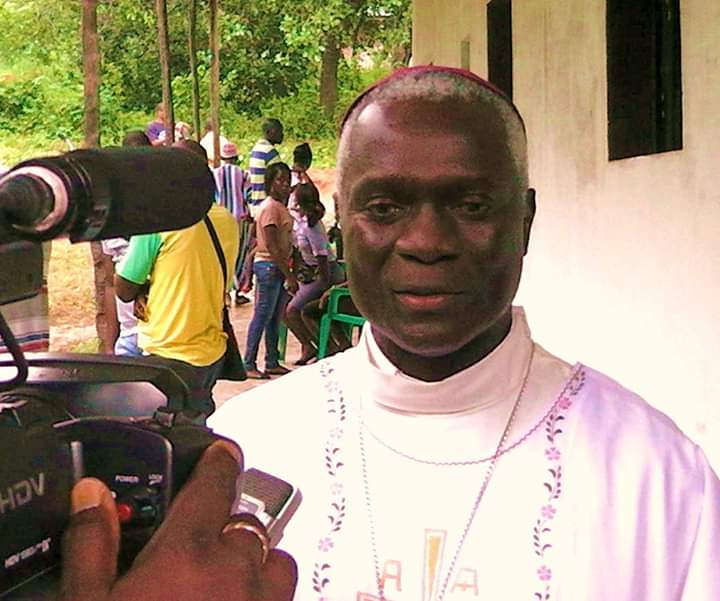
- Church: Roman Catholic Church
- Diocese: Bissau
- See: Bissau
- In office: 12 January 2000 – 11 July 2020
- Predecessor: Settimio Ferrazzetta
- Successor: José Lampra Cà
- Other posts: Vice-President of the Regional Episcopal Conference of West Africa (2016-); President of the Conference of Bishops of Senegal, Mauritania, Cape Verde and Guinea-Bissau (2017-)
- Previous posts: Vice-President of the Conference of Bishops of Senegal, Mauritania, Cape Verde and Guinea-Bissau (2014-17)

Orders
- Ordination: 31 December 1982
- Consecration: 12 January 2000 by Jean-Paul Aimé Gobel

Personal details
- Born: José Câmnate na Bissign; 28 May 1953 (age 73) Mansôa, Guinea-Bissau

José Câmnate na Bissign (born Mansôa, 28 May 1953) is a Guinea-Bissauan Roman Catholic bishop. He was the first native bishop of Guinea-Bissau, serving from 2000 to 2020.

He was ordained a priest in Bissau, at 31 December 1982, aged 29 years old. After the death of Settimio Ferrazzetta, he was appointed the second bishop of the Diocese of Bissau on 15 October 1999. He was received his episcopal consecration on 12 February 2000.

He has been involved in the dialogue between the different political and religious groups in Guinea-Bissau. He was one of the main proponents of the Commission Justice and Peace and of the Council for ecumenical dialogue, inter-religious and for the promotion of human dignity.

Pope Francis accepted his resignation on 11 July 2020.
