= List of banks in Guinea-Bissau =

This is a list of commercial banks in Guinea-Bissau, as updated in September 2024 by the Banking Commission of the West African Monetary Union.

== List of commercial banks ==
- Banco Da Africa Ocidental (BAO), part of Bank of Africa Group
- Banco Da União (BDU)
- Ecobank Guinée-Bissau, part of Ecobank Group
- Branch of Coris Bank Senegal, part of Coris Bank Group
- Branch of Orabank Côte d'Ivoire, part of Orabank Group
- Branch of Banque Atlantique Côte d'Ivoire, part of BCP Group

== See also ==
- Economy of Guinea-Bissau
- List of companies based in Guinea-Bissau
- List of banks in Africa
