= Carlos Pedro Zilli =

Brazilian bishop (1954–2021)

Carlos Pedro Zilli PIME
- Bishop of Bafatá, Guinea-Bissau
- Church: Catholic Church
- Diocese: Diocese of Bafatá
- In office: 13 March 2001 – 31 March 2021
- Predecessor: Diocese erected
- Successor: Víctor Luís Quematcha

Orders
- Ordination: 5 January 1985 by Geraldo Majella Agnelo
- Consecration: 30 June 2001 by Albano Bortoletto Cavallin

Personal details
- Born: 7 October 1954 Santa Cruz do Rio Pardo, São Paulo, United States of Brazil
- Died: 31 March 2021 (aged 66) Prabis, Biombo region, Guinea-Bissau

Carlos Pedro Zilli (7 October 1954 – 31 March 2021) was a Brazilian-born Bissau-Guinean Roman Catholic bishop. He became the Roman Catholic bishop of the newly created Diocese of Bafatá in Guinea-Bissau in 2001.

== Biography ==
Zilli was born in Santa Cruz do Rio Pardo, São Paulo State. He became a member of the Pontifical Institute for Foreign Missions (P.I.M.E.) on 6 July 1984. He was ordained a Roman Catholic priest on 5 January 1985. He was sent shortly after to Guinea-Bissau, where he was parochial vicar at Bafatá mission. He was also deputy of the bishop for the Cacheu zone. He held office as president of the commission for the formation of the major seminarians, from 1986 to 1998, and regional superior of the Pontifical Institute for Foreign Missions in Guinea-Bissau, from 1993 to 1997.

On 13 March 2001, Zilli was appointed the first bishop of the Diocese of Bafatá when it was created from the Diocese of Bissau. He was ordained on 30 June 2001.

Zilli died in Prabis on 31 March 2021, from COVID-19. He was 66 years old.
