= Port of Bissau =

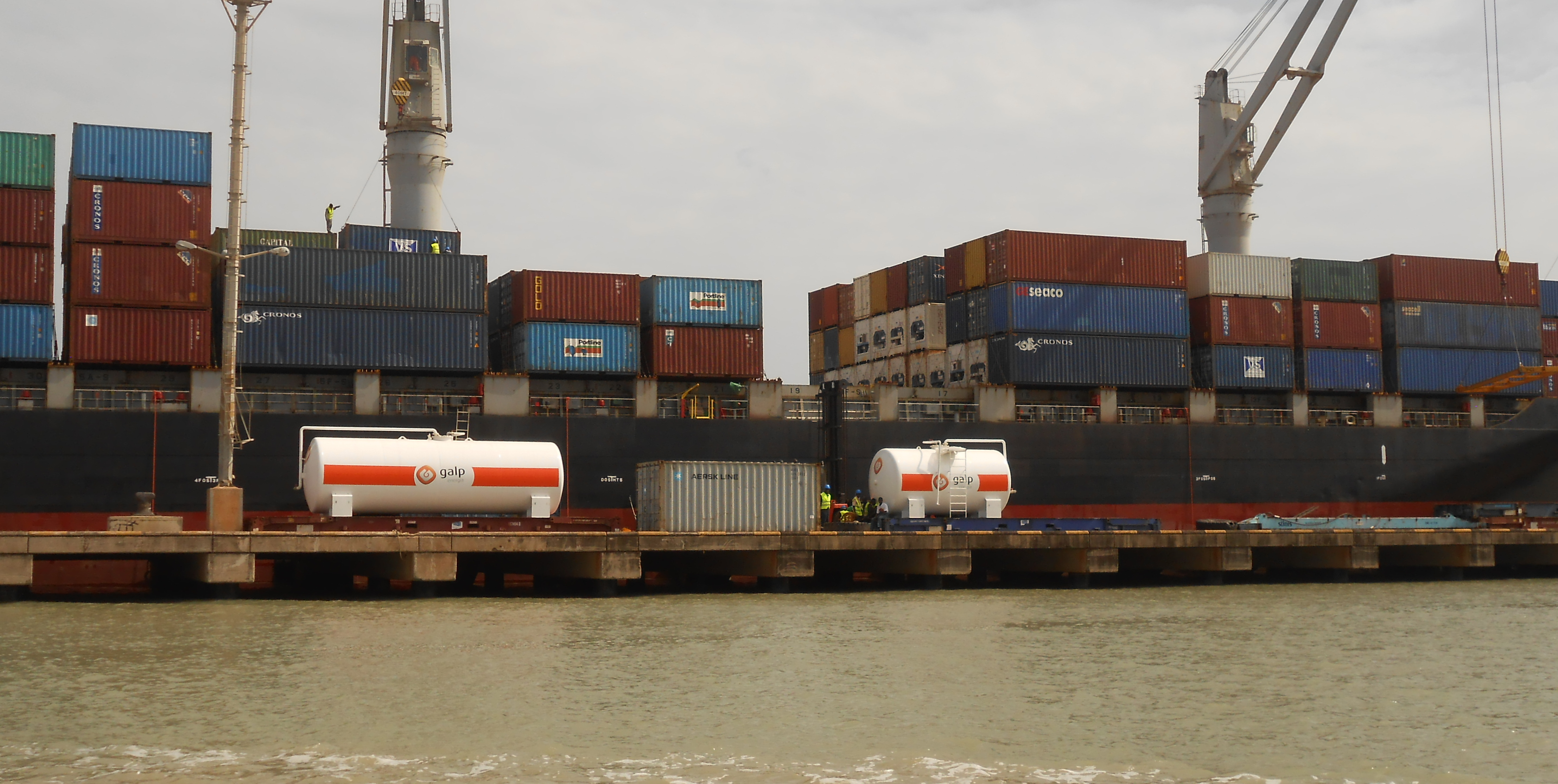
- Port of Bissau (Port Pidjiguiti)
- Click on the map for a fullscreen view

Location
- Country: Guinea-Bissau
- Location: Bissau
- Coordinates: 11°51′00″N 15°35′00″W

Details
- Opened: 17th century
- Type of harbour: Natural/Artificial

The Port of Bissau, also known as Porto Pidjiguiti, is the chief port of Guinea-Bissau. Located on Geba River, it serves the capital of Bissau. It has two piers and a jetty. The port's Pidjiguiti docks were the site of the Pidjiguiti massacre on 3 August 1959. A light on Bissau Cathedral is maintained by the harbourmaster.

== Description ==
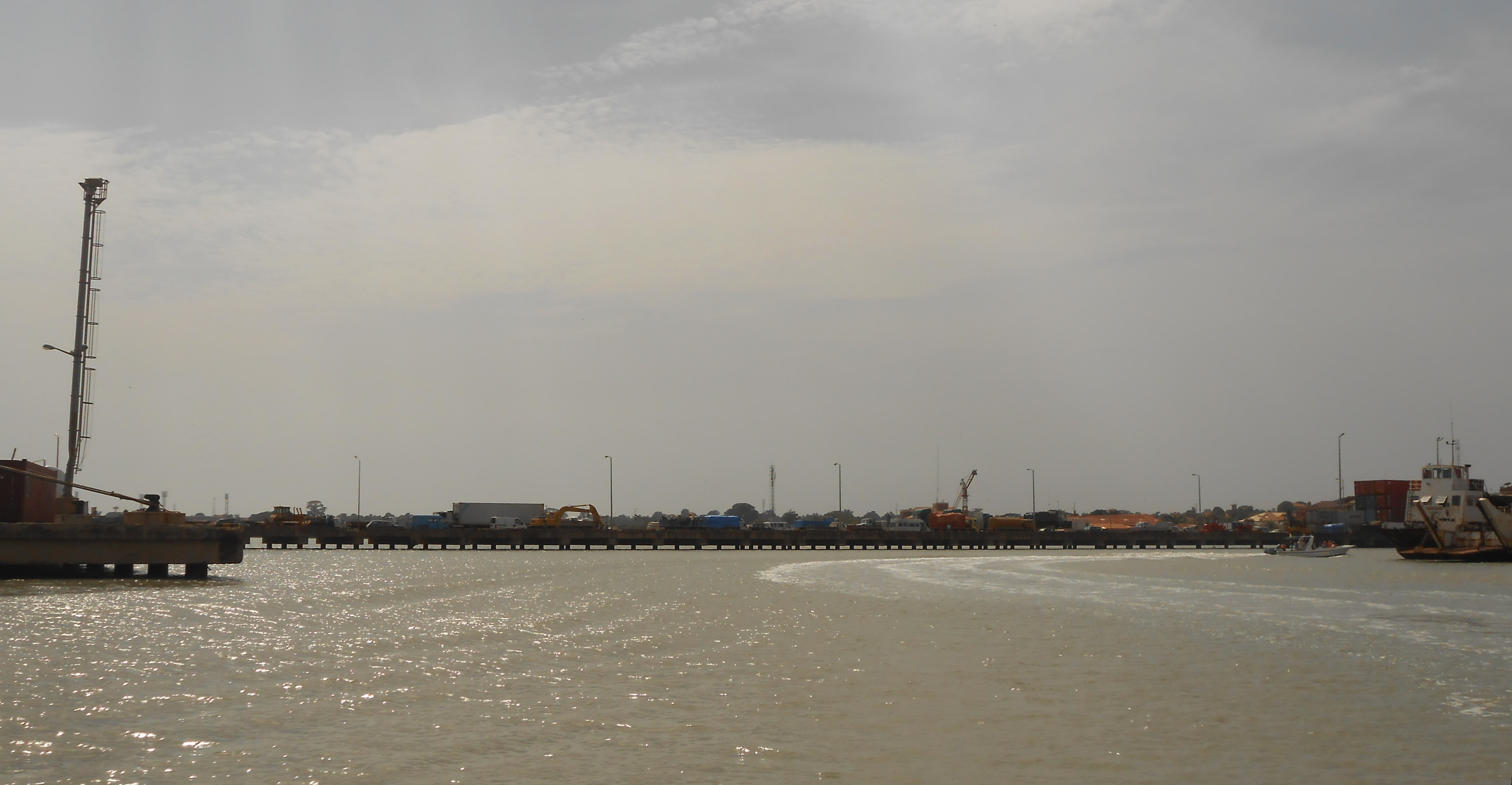
A portion of the port of Bissau

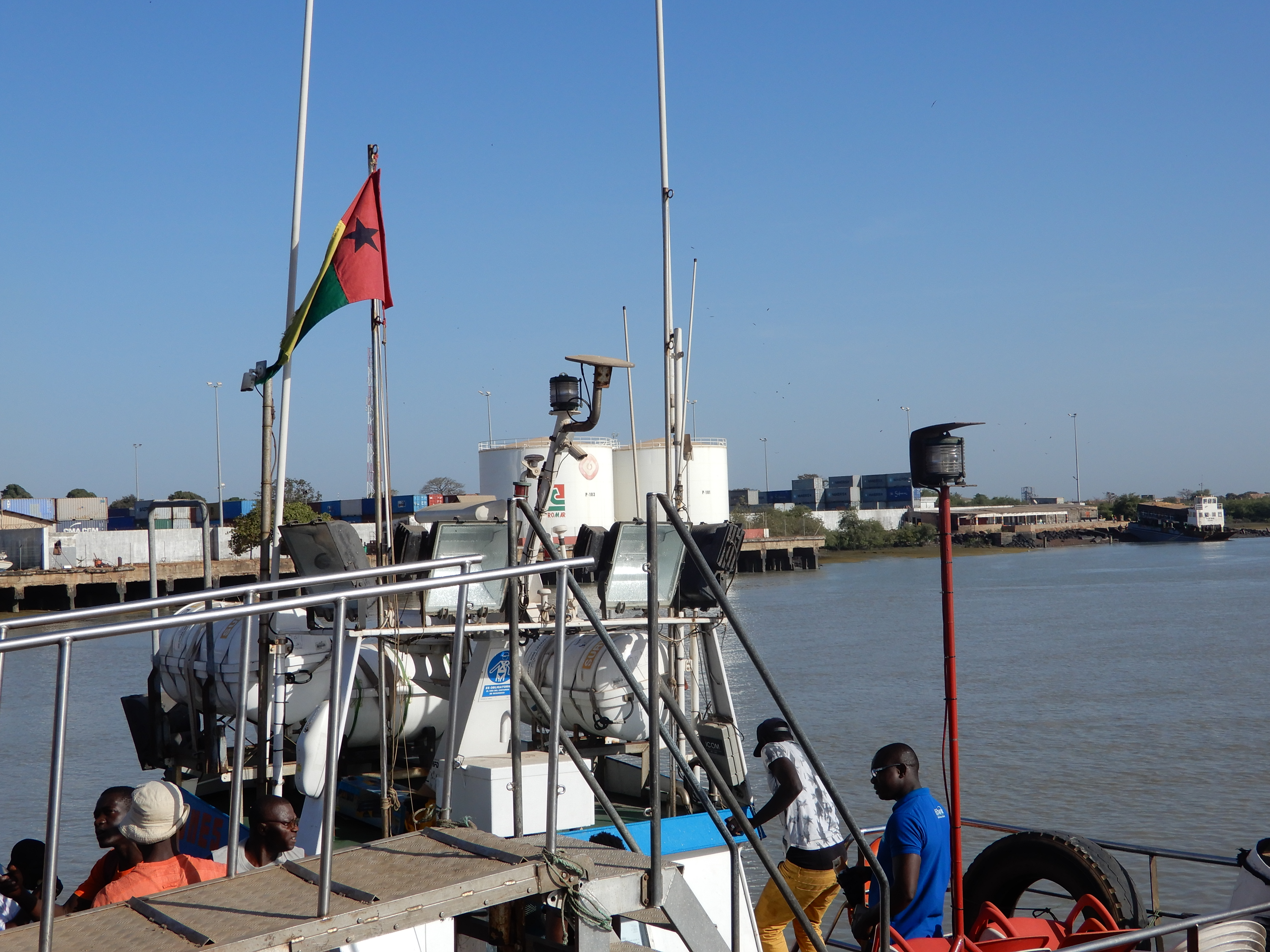
Bissau's port

The port is situated on Geba River. Its channel has a depth of 36 feet (11 m) to 40 feet (12 m) and cargo pier of 26 feet (7.9 m) to 30 feet (9.1 m). It has crane facilities for up to 50 tonnes. The cargo port has two piers, a southwest pier and, a newer one on the northeast. The newer T-shaped 260 metres (850 ft) long pier was built in 1993. The jetty connecting it is 260 by 24 metres (853 ft × 79 ft), and provides access to the shore. Thirty years before 2013, the channel was dredged to provide a draft of 12 metres (39 ft). However, the present draft is said to be 7 metres (23 ft). Bissau Cathedral tower houses a light which guides ships through the Geba River estuary to the Port of Bissau. The light is maintained by the Capitania dos Portos, Serviços de Marinha.

== History ==
The port has major significance to the history and economic development of the nation. Given the importance of the port to the national economy, and the previously poor facilities of the port, a great deal of investment occurred in the 2010s. This facilitated the growth of the mining industry in the country, with the exportation of bauxite. Plans to develop the port to support the shipping of bauxite go back to at least 1983, when a $47.4 million project was announced.

The port's Pidjiguiti docks were the site of the Pidjiguiti massacre, which took place on 3 August 1959, when police shot the dockworkers, killing 50 and wounding over 100 people. The stevedores were on their first strike, organized by the African Party for the Independence of Guinea and Cape Verde (Partido Africano da Independência da Guiné e Cabo Verde, PAIGC), marking the beginning of strong resistance against the Portuguese colonial authority. A large, black, fist monument commemorates the massacre. Several older buildings remain around the port area, including the 18th century military barracks and old prison.

== Port operation ==
The Bissau port was designed to handle 5,000 containers a year, yet it serves nearly five times as many today. A consequence of its overstretched capacity is the high costs related to its operation.

Port Handling charges - comparative costs Dakar, Banjul & Bissau
	Banjul	Dakar	Bissau
Days in the port	14	12	16
Total cost (USD)	11 9387	71 094	96 162

Source: World Bank; African Development Bank study on the transport sector in Guinea-Bissau
