= Cufar =

- Town
- Location in Guinea-Bissau
- Coordinates: 11°17′17″N 15°10′50″W
- Country: Guinea-Bissau
- Region: Tombali Region
- Time zone: UTC+0 (GMT)

Cufar is a town in the Tombali Region of southern Guinea-Bissau.

== Transport ==
The town is served by Cufar Airport.
