= Air Bissau =

Bissau-Guinean airline

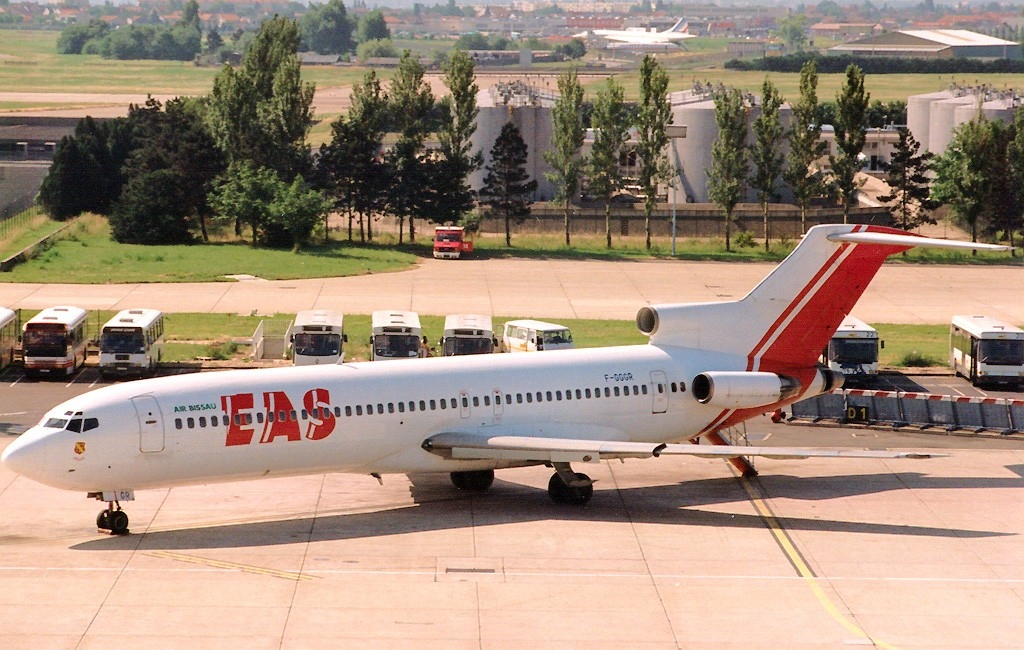
IATA	ICAO	Call sign
TZ	GBU	TRANSBISSAU
- Founded: 1960
- Ceased operations: 1998
- Hubs: Bissau
- Headquarters: Bissau

Air Bissau was the flag carrier of Guinea-Bissau, operating services from its base at Osvaldo Vieira International Airport in Bissau.

== History ==
Transportes Aéreos da Guiné Portuguesa (TAGP) was founded in 1960 to operate flights within Portuguese Guinea as its flag carrier. Services on routes from Bissau to external destinations like Dakar, Ilha do Sal and Praia were inaugurated not long after foundation. A de Havilland Heron and two de Havilland Dragon Rapides were operating on the routes by 1961. By 1968 the airline was operating two de Havilland Herons, three Dornier Do 27s, one Cessna 206, one Cessna 172 and one Auster. The Portuguese national airline, TAP took over some TAGP flights, operating them with Boeing aircraft instead of with TAGP's Cessnas. TAP operated from Ilha do Sal to Bissau with the Boeings, and TAGP would operate the return flight with its light aircraft.

When Portuguese Guinea gained independence from Portugal in 1974 and renamed Guinea-Bissau, the airline was also renamed to Linhas Aéreas da Guiné-Bissau. The company was operating one HS-748, one Dornier Do 27 and a Cessna 206 at that time.

By the mid-1980s the airline would be owned by the Palestine Liberation Organization (PLO), which at the time owned Maldives Airways as well. The name of the airline was changed to Transportes Aéreos da Guiné-Bissau (TAGB). It operated services to Senegal, Cape Verde, The Gambia and Guinea, in addition to domestic services from Bissau to Bubaque. In 1988, a service from Bissau to Paris was inaugurated, as a joint-service with French airline Europe Aéro Service, operated with a Boeing 727 from the latter. The name of the airline was changed to Air Bissau, its final name, in 1989.

A Fokker F27 of the airline crashed near Dori in Burkina Faso on 15 August 1991, killing the three Palestinian crew members on board. The aircraft which was on a flight from Kano in Nigeria to Bamako, Mali struck trees and then crashed and broke up. The crash highlighted the role of the Palestinian Liberation Organisation in the operations of Air Bissau, which reportedly supplied the airline with three Fokker F27s and which were operated by Palestinian crews. According to Flight International this role had been codified by an agreement between the PLO and Guinea-Bissau in 1988, which according to Daniel Pipes saw George Khallaq buying part equity in the airline from the government of Guinea-Bissau.

The airline also operated an Antonov An-24, and it was this aircraft which crashed on 7 April 1992 near Ma'tan as-Sarra in Libya. The aircraft was on a flight from Khartoum, Sudan to Tunis, Tunisia, when it encountered a sandstorm in the Libyan Desert, forcing the Palestinian crew to attempt an emergency landing at Maaten al-Sarra Air Base. According to Libyan radio reports the aircraft vanished 15 minutes before reaching the base. The aircraft was carrying PLO Chairman Yasser Arafat, and an entourage of bodyguards and assistants. The aircraft was found by the Libyan Air Force almost 12 hours after the crash, where it was confirmed the three crew were killed, and all ten passengers, including Arafat, survived.

It was reported that by 1996 all of the aircraft in the fleet were either sold or written off, and the government was planning to privatise the airline. All flights of the airline were being operated as joint services with other airlines, utilising their aircraft. Air Bissau was operating a joint-weekly service from Bissau to Lisbon with a Boeing 757 operated by Transportes Aéreos de Cabo Verde, and a weekly service from Bissau to Dakar, again in conjunction with the Cape Verde national airline, utilising one of its ATR 42s.

The airline was liquidated in 1998, when the Guinea-Bissau government contracted all services to TACV of Cape Verde.
