= Settimio Ferrazzetta =

Italian-born Guinea-Bissauan Roman Catholic bishop (1924-1999)

The Right Reverend Settimio Ferrazzetta
- Bishop of Bissau
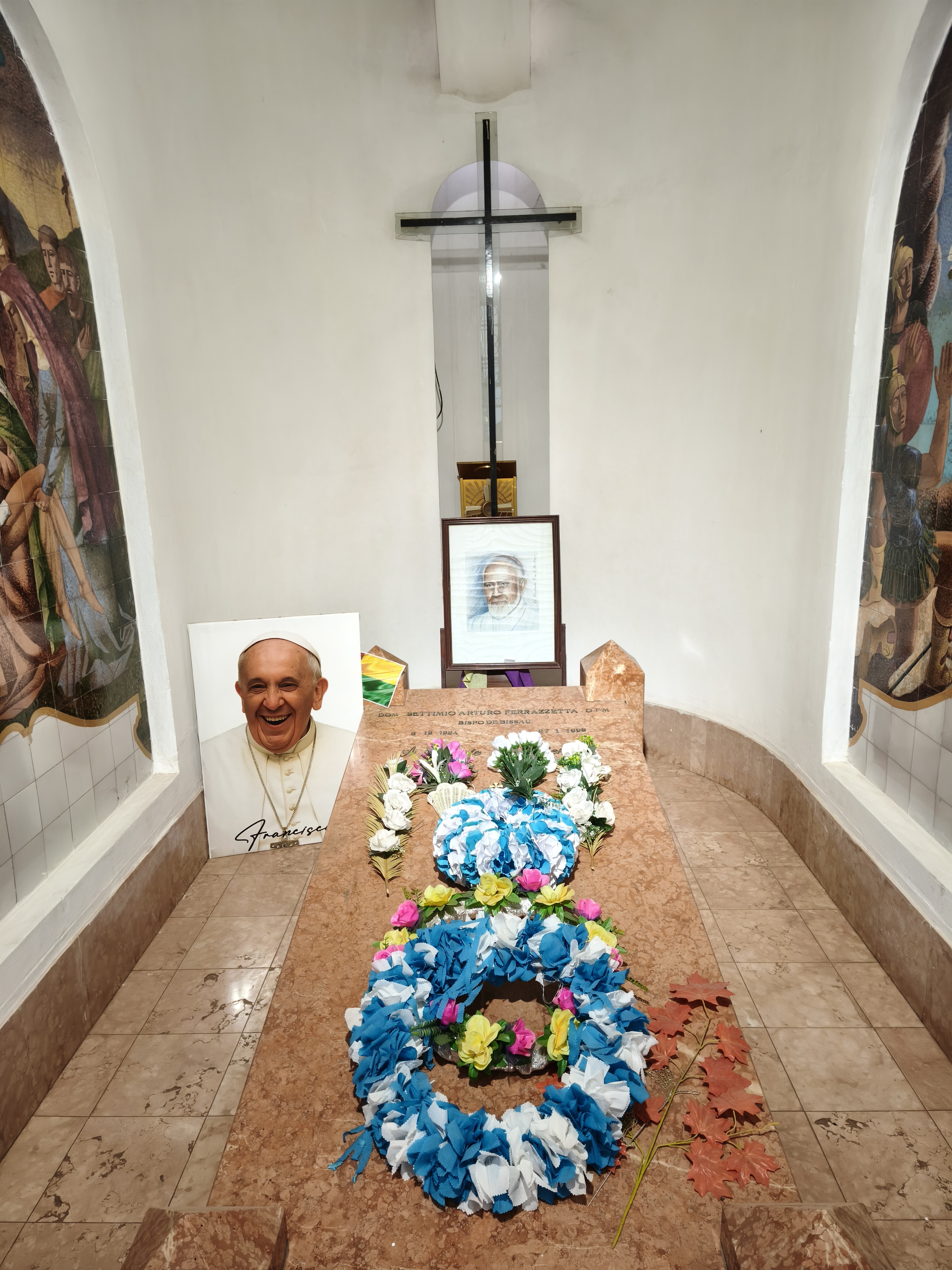
- Tomb in Bissau Cathedral
- Church: Roman Catholic Church
- See: Bissau
- In office: 21 March 1977 – 26 January 1999
- Successor: José Câmnate na Bissign

Orders
- Ordination: 1 July 1955
- Consecration: 19 June 1977

Personal details
- Born: 8 December 1924 Selva di Progno, Verona, Italy
- Died: 26 January 1999 (aged 74) Bissau, Guinea-Bissau

Settimio Arturo Ferrazzetta O.F.M. (8 December 1924 in Selva di Progno, Verona – 26 January 1999 in Bissau) was an Italian-born Guinea-Bissauan Roman Catholic bishop.

He was ordained a priest at the Order of Friars Minor on 1 July 1951. In 1955 he went to Portuguese Guinea as a missionary, where he dedicated himself to health and educational activities. He first started a leprosery in Cumura.

After the independence of Guinea-Bissau, he was appointed the first bishop of the new Roman Catholic Diocese of Bissau, on 21 March 1977, being ordained on 19 June 1977. He continued his missionary activity, working for the promotion at the human, social and religious levels of the Guinea-Bissauans. Ferrazzetta achieved the respect and admiration of the population in general, not only the small Roman Catholic community, but also the Muslim and animist communities.

In 1998, during the armed tension between President João Bernardo Vieira and general Ansumane Mane, he worked as the mediator. He died soon afterwards, before the end of the hostilities, on 26 January 1999, aged 74 years old. His death was mourned as a great national loss. He was buried in the Bissau Cathedral.
