= Lamego (surname) =

Lamego is a Portuguese surname. Notable people with the surname include:

- Djibril Lamego (born 2003), French footballer
- Manuel Rodrigues Lamego (born circa 1950), Portuguese merchant and slave trader
- Paulo Lamego (born 1950), Brazilian sports shooter
