= Quebo =

- Location in Guinea-Bissau
- Coordinates: 11°32′09″N 14°45′57″W
- Country: Guinea-Bissau
- Region: Tombali Region

Population (2008 est.)
  - Total: 6,195

Quebo is a town located in the Tombali Region of Guinea-Bissau. Population 6,195 (2008 est), It is the seat of the sector of the same name.

It is served by Quebo Airport.
