= Catholic Church in Guinea-Bissau =

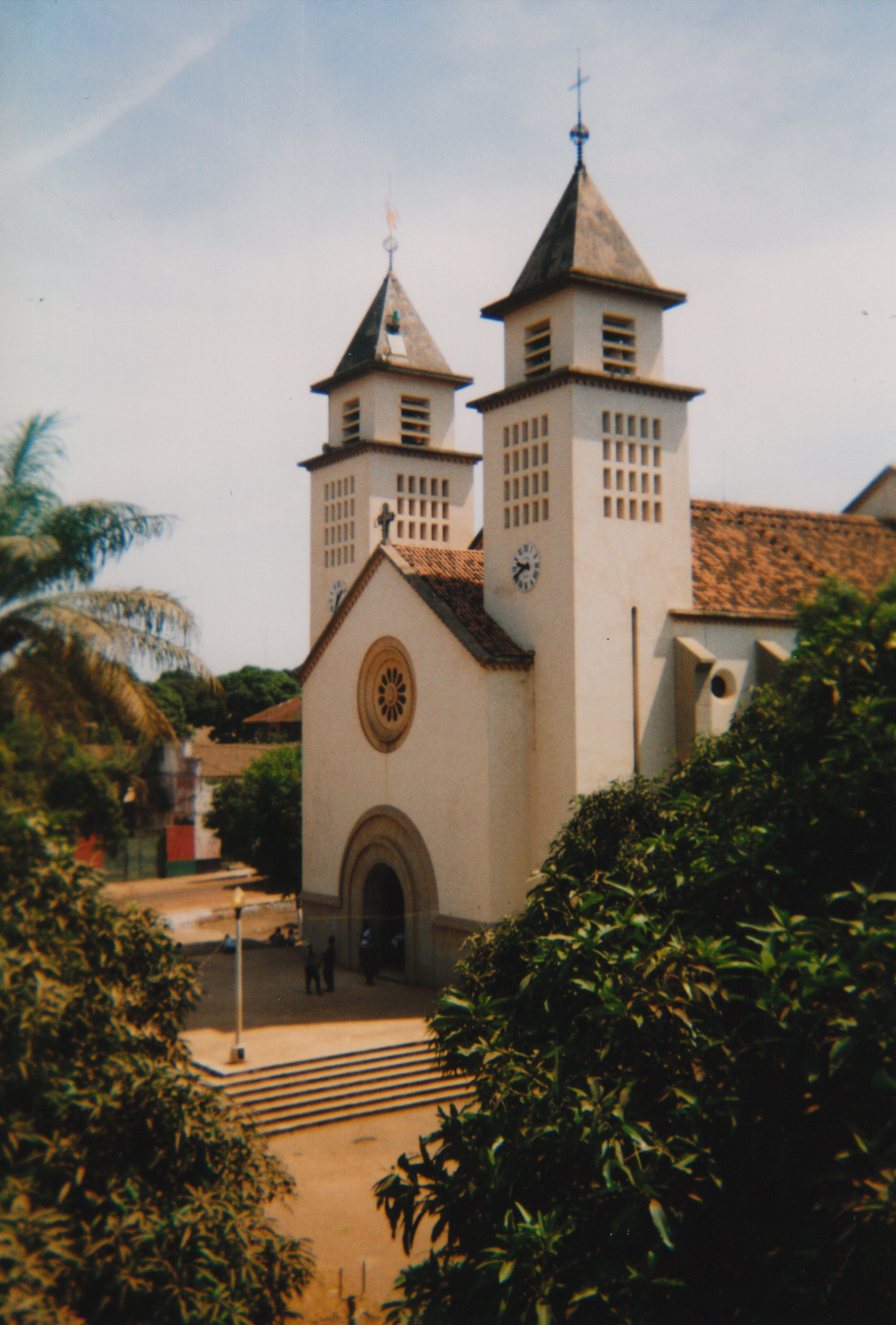
Cathedral of Our Lady of Candelária in Bissau

The Catholic Church in Guinea-Bissau is part of the worldwide Catholic Church, under the spiritual leadership of the Pope in Rome.

In 2020, over 31% of the country's population belonged to the Roman Catholic Church (including Portuguese Guinea-Bissauans).

There are two dioceses:

- Bafatá under bishop Victor Luís Quematcha
- Bissau under bishop José Lampra Cà

== See also ==
- Religion in Guinea-Bissau
- Christianity in Guinea-Bissau
