= Guine Bissau Airlines =

Airline in Guinea-Bissau

Safari Guiné Bissau Airlines
IATA	ICAO	Call sign
G6	BSR	Bissau Airlines
- Commenced operations: 2010
- Ceased operations: 2010
- Headquarters: Bissau, Guinea-Bissau

Safari Guiné Bissau Airlines was an airline in Guinea-Bissau. It was founded in 2010 and ceased operations the same year.

== Code data ==
Safari Airlines operated under:

- IATA Code: G6
- ICAO Code: BSR
- Callsign: BISSAU AIRLINES
