= Diocese of Bissau =

Roman Catholic diocese in Guinea-Bissau

Coordinates: 11.8600°N 15.5811°W

Diocese of Bissau Dioecesis Bissagensis
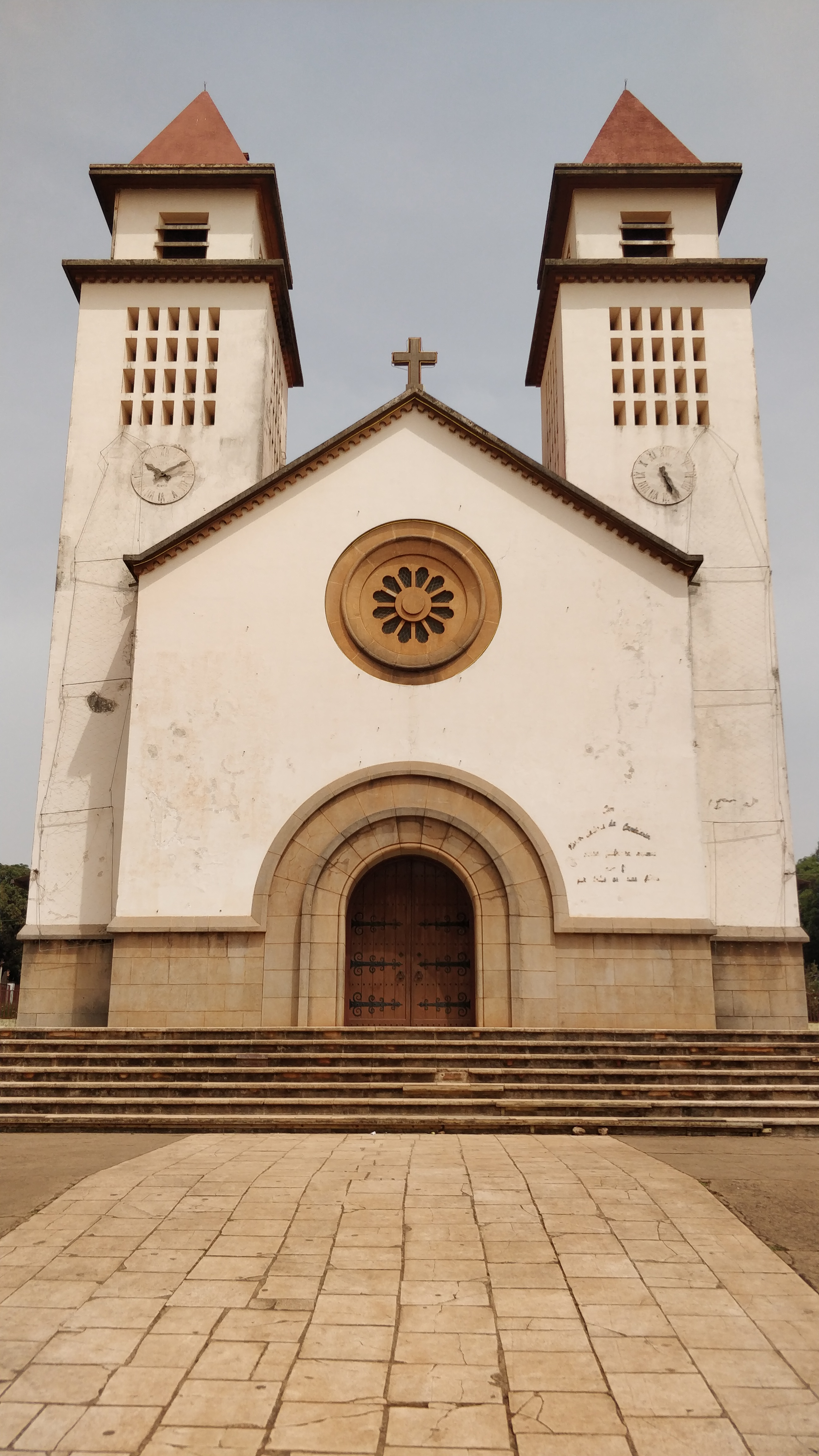

Location
- Country: Guinea-Bissau
- Metropolitan: Immediately subject to the Holy See

Statistics
- Area: 11,490 km^{2} (4,440 sq mi)
- Population: Total; Catholics: (as of 2012); 1,050,000; 166,000 (15,77%)

Information
- Rite: Latin Rite
- Cathedral: Cathedral of Our Lady of Candelária, Bissau

Current leadership
- Pope: Leo XIV
- Bishop: José Lampra Cà
- Bishops emeritus: José Câmnate na Bissign

Map
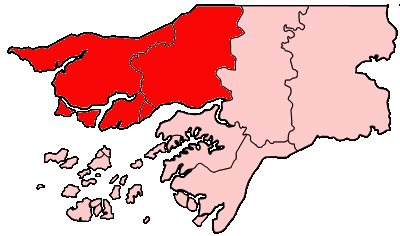

Website
- diocese de bissau.gw

The Roman Catholic Diocese of Bissau (Latin: Bissagen(sis)) is a diocese located in the city of Bissau in Guinea-Bissau.

== History ==
Pope Pius XII created a Mission “sui iuris” comprising the then overseas colony of Portuguese Guinea on September 4, 1940, until then under the jurisdiction of the Diocese of Santiago de Cabo Verde, in Cape Verde islands. It was promoted to an Apostolic Prefecture on April 29, 1955. After the independence of Guinea-Bissau, on September 10, 1974, it was renamed as Apostolic Prefecture of Guinea-Bissau the January 1st, 1975. The Diocese of Bissau was finally created on 21 March 1977. The first Bishop of the Diocese of Bissau was Italian-born Settimio Ferrazzetta, who held office until his death, at 26 January 1999. He was succeeded by the first Bissau-Guinean native bishop, José Câmnate na Bissign, aged 57 years old. On 13 May 2011 Pope Benedict XVI named Father José Lampra Cà as Auxiliary Bishop of Bissau. Lampra Cá was born in 1964 and ordained a priest in 1997. He was formerly the Rector of the St. Kizito Minor Seminary and Professor of Philosophy at the Major Seminary of Bissau.

== Chronology ==
- September 4, 1940: Established as the Mission “sui iuris” of Portuguese Guinea from the Diocese of Santiago de Cabo Verde in Cape Verde
- April 29, 1955: Promoted as the Apostolic Prefecture of Portuguese Guinea
- January 1, 1975: Renamed as the Apostolic Prefecture of Guinea-Bissau
- March 21, 1977: Promoted to the Diocese of Bissau

== Leadership ==
- Ecclesiastical Superiors of Portuguese Guinea
  - Fr. Giuseppe Ribeiro de Magalhães, O.F.M. (1941.06.20 – 1953)
  - Fr. Martinho da Silva Carvalhosa, O.F.M. (1953 – 1955.04.29 see below)
- Prefects Apostolic of Portuguese Guinea
  - Fr. Martinho da Silva Carvalhosa, O.F.M. (see above 1955.04.29 – 1963)
  - Fr. João Ferreira, O.F.M. (1963.01.25 – 1965)
  - Fr. Amândio Domingues Neto, O.F.M. (1966.04.04 – 1977)
- Bishops of Bissau
  - Bishop Settimio Ferrazzetta, O.F.M. (1977.03.21 – 1999.01.26)
  - Bishop José Câmnate na Bissign (1999.10.15 – 2020.07.11)
  - Bishop José Lampra Cà (2021.12.10 –2026.11.07)

=== Auxiliary Bishop ===
- José Lampra Cà (2011 – 2021)

== See also ==
- Roman Catholicism in Guinea-Bissau
- Roman Catholic Diocese of Bafatá

== Sources ==
- GCatholic.org
- Catholic Hierarchy
