= Osvaldo Vieira International Airport =

Airport in Guinea-Bissau

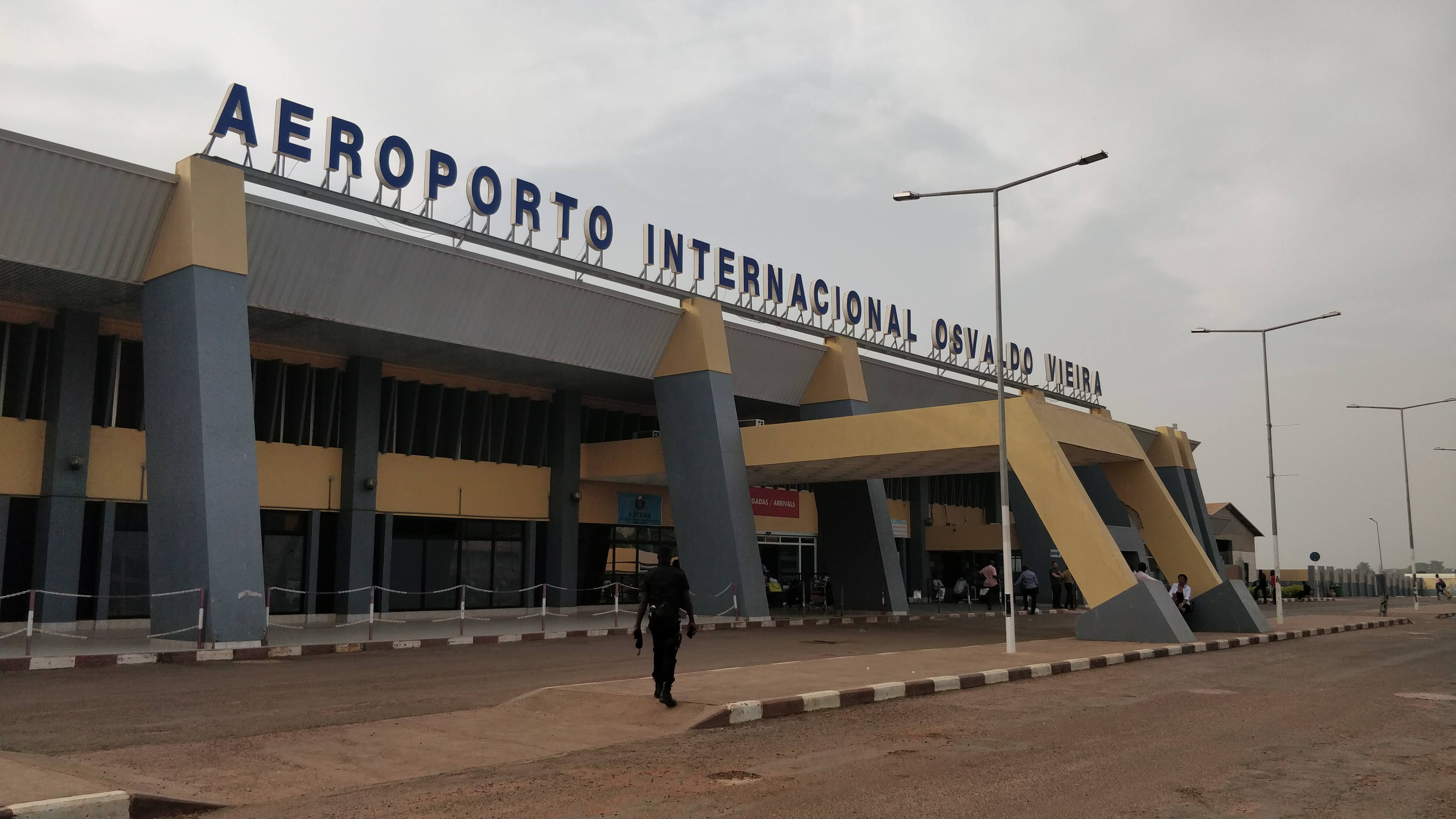
- IATA: OXB; ICAO: GGOV

Summary
- Airport type: Public
- Operator: N/A
- Serves: Bissau, Guinea-Bissau
- Elevation AMSL: 39 m (128 ft)
- Coordinates: 11°53′42″N 15°39′13″W

Map
- Location of airport in Guinea-Bissau

Runways
Direction	Length		Surface
Direction	m	ft	Surface
03/21	3,200	10,499	Asphalt

Osvaldo Vieira International Airport (IATA: OXB, ICAO: GGOV), also known as Bissau-Bissalanca Airport, is an international airport that serves the city of Bissau, the capital of Guinea-Bissau, as well as the Metropolitan Region of Bissau. It is the only international airport in the country.

It is located in the Bissalanca district, in the city-sector of Safim, which is conurbated to Bissau.

== Name ==
The name "Osvaldo Vieira" was given in honor of one of the most prominent nationalist commanders of the PAIGC and FARP during the country's war of independence.

== History ==
Before 1955, the city of Bissau depended mainly on the (now abandoned) Bolama airport, which was close to the town of Bolama, the colonial capital of Guinea until 1941. Travellers landing there still needed to take ferries to get to Bissau.

The airport was opened in May 1955 receiving the name "Francisco Craveiro Lopes Airport", precisely during the visit of this Portuguese president. Despite its official name, it was generally called "Bissalanca Airport".

Between 1961 and 1965, already during the Guinea-Bissau War of Independence, it was transformed into Base Aerodrome No. 2 (AB2), and; between 1965 and 1974 at Air Base No. 12 (BA12), of the Portuguese Air Force.

The airport had to be closed on 7 June 1998 due to intense fighting in and around Bissau. It was officially reopened in July 1999 when a TAP Portugal plane carrying Prime Minister Francisco Fadul, along with numerous other dignitaries from both Portugal and Guinea-Bissau, landed at Osvaldo Vieira.

On 10 December 2013, TAP Portugal suspended operations to Osvaldo Vieira International Airport after local police forces threatened the crew of Flight TP202 bound for Lisbon and forced the crew to board 74 Syrian refugees who had arrived in Bissau via Morocco and Turkey, and who were holding forged Turkish passports. After TAP Portugal suspended flights to Bissau in late 2013, the airport remained without flights to Lisbon until late October 2014, when euroAtlantic Airways announced a weekly flight between Bissau and Lisbon. However, TAP announced in August 2016 it would resume flights to Bissau by the end of the year.

== Facilities ==
Osvaldo Vieira International Airport has one runway, heading 03/21, with a length of 3,200 metres (10,500 feet). The altitude of this runway is 39 m (128 ft). This runway is also one of the three in Guinea-Bissau that are paved.

== Airlines and destinations ==
Airlines	Destinations
Air Côte d'Ivoire	Abidjan, Dakar–Diass
Air Senegal	Dakar–Diass
ASKY Airlines	Lomé
euroAtlantic Airways	Lisbon
Royal Air Maroc	Casablanca
TAP Air Portugal	Lisbon
Turkish Airlines	Dakar–Diass, Istanbul

== See also ==
- List of airports in Guinea-Bissau
