= Bafatá =

City in Guinea-Bissau

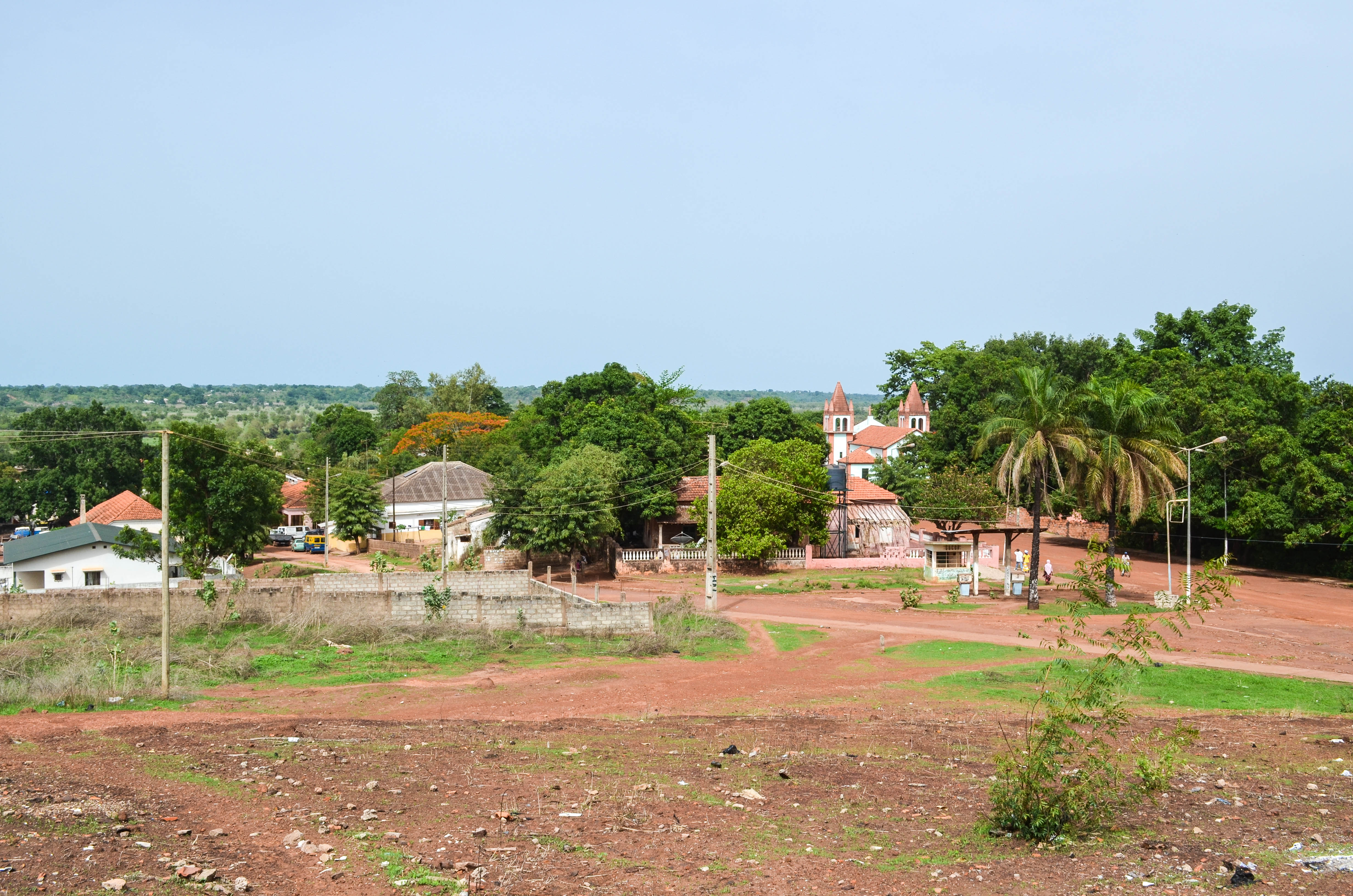

- Location in Guinea-Bissau Bafatá (Africa)
- Coordinates: 12°10′19″N 14°39′27″W
- Country: Guinea-Bissau
- Admin. Region: Bafatá Region
- Established: 1860s
- Incorporated as a town: 1913
- Elevation: 10 m (33 ft)

Population (2010)
  - Total: 34,760

Bafatá is the second-largest city in Guinea-Bissau, known as the birthplace of Amílcar Cabral. The town has a population of 22,501 (2008 est). It is the capital of Bafatá Region as well as the seat of the Roman Catholic Diocese of Bafatá, which was established in March 2001 with Carlos Pedro Zilli as bishop.

== Etymology ==
'Bafatá' comes from the Mandinka phrase 'baa faata' meaning 'the river is full', in reference to the Geba river.

== History ==
Bafatá was founded in the mid 1800s by Malam Santi, a Mandinka veteran of Portuguese 'pacification campaigns' in the interior. By the 1880s it was an established trading centre for the Portuguese, including peanuts, cattle, hides, textiles, and salt.

The presidio of nearby Geba was transferred to Bafatá in 1906, dramatically raising the town's profile and importance. Soon thereafter, Commandant Vasco de Sousa Calvet de Magalhães arrived, and used forced labor to build the market, port, bridge, and other infrastructure. It became a town in 1913.

== Landmarks ==
The town is served by Bafatá Airport, an airstrip, and a regional hospital. There is a hotel, the Bafatá Apartamento Imel. The restaurant Ponto de Encontro serves Portuguese cuisine. The surrounding forests are noted for their monkey and antelope populations, and Maimama Cape, owned by a Cape Verdean, organizes trips to visit the animals for tourists. The town is in a derelict state; the streets contain tumbleweeds and cracked tarmac. Several of the main avenues are named Bissau, Brazil and Guiana.

Bafatá is noted for its brickmaking.

== Climate ==
Bafatá has a tropical savanna climate (Köppen Aw), not dissimilar to Bissau although about a third drier overall and substantially hotter during the afternoons due to its inland location. As with all of Guinea-Bissau, there are two extremely contrasting seasons: a dry season from November to May with dusty harmattan winds and sweltering, rainless weather, and a monsoonal wet season from June to October featuring heavy thunderstorm rains almost every day and hot, uncomfortably humid conditions.

Climate data for Bafatá (1991–2020)
Month	Jan	Feb	Mar	Apr	May	Jun	Jul	Aug	Sep	Oct	Nov	Dec	Year
Mean daily maximum °C (°F)	34.2 (93.6)	37.4 (99.3)	39.0 (102.2)	39.7 (103.5)	38.5 (101.3)	35.2 (95.4)	31.9 (89.4)	31.3 (88.3)	31.8 (89.2)	33.0 (91.4)	33.9 (93.0)	33.5 (92.3)	35.0 (95.0)
Daily mean °C (°F)	25.4 (77.7)	27.7 (81.9)	29.9 (85.8)	30.8 (87.4)	30.7 (87.3)	28.9 (84.0)	27.2 (81.0)	26.7 (80.1)	26.7 (80.1)	27.4 (81.3)	27.4 (81.3)	25.0 (77.0)	27.8 (82.0)
Mean daily minimum °C (°F)	16.4 (61.5)	17.9 (64.2)	20.8 (69.4)	21.9 (71.4)	22.9 (73.2)	22.7 (72.9)	22.5 (72.5)	22.1 (71.8)	21.7 (71.1)	21.8 (71.2)	20.8 (69.4)	16.4 (61.5)	20.7 (69.3)
Average rainfall mm (inches)	0.2 (0.01)	0.0 (0.0)	0.1 (0.00)	0.2 (0.01)	24.8 (0.98)	128.9 (5.07)	267.8 (10.54)	344.7 (13.57)	349.2 (13.75)	152.4 (6.00)	3.2 (0.13)	0.1 (0.00)	1,271.6 (50.06)
Average rainy days (≥ 1.0 mm)	0.0	0.0	0.0	0.0	2.9	9.2	16.6	23.2	26.6	10.3	1.0	0.0	89.8
Source: NOAA

== Gallery ==
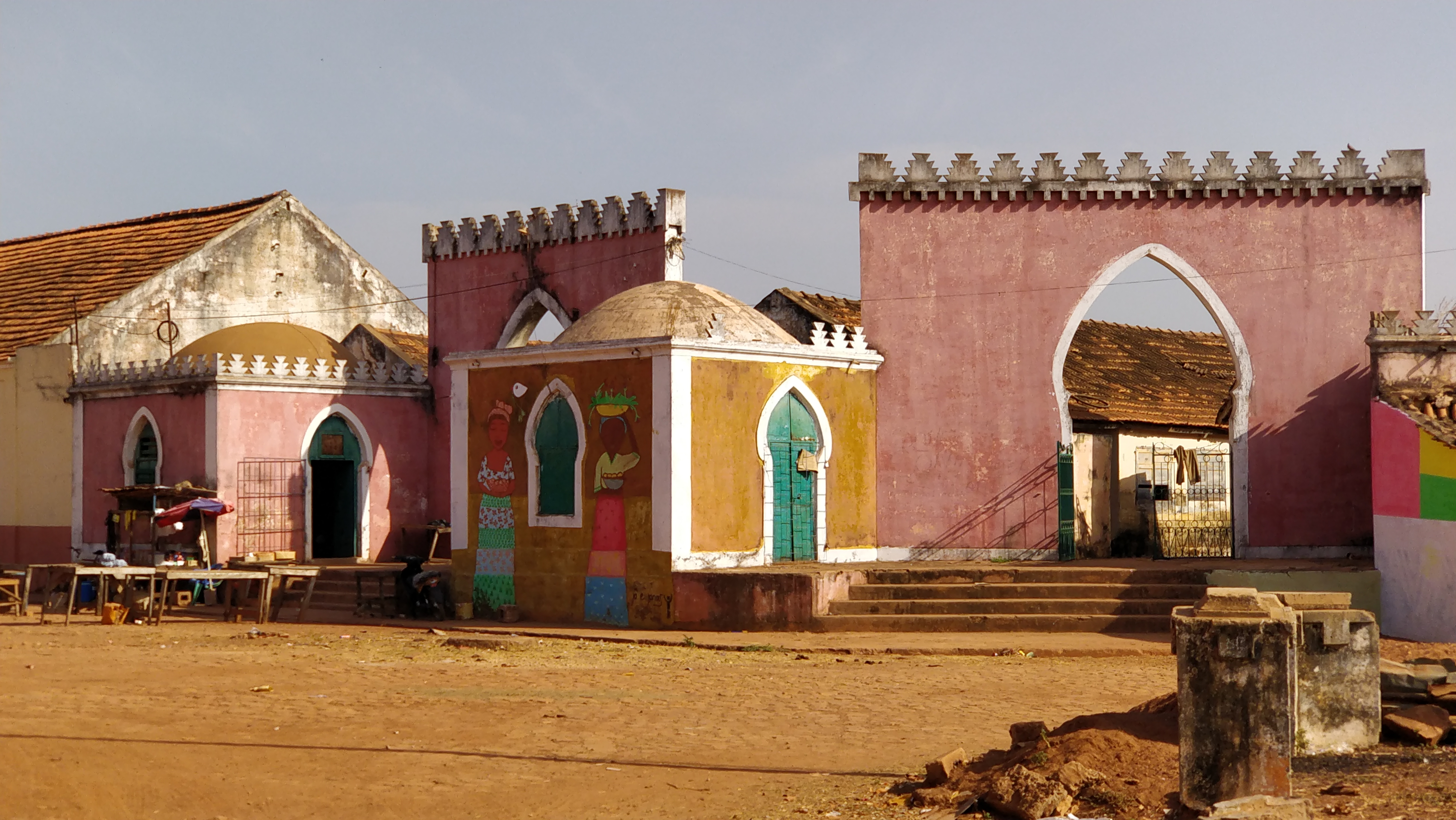
Bafatá market

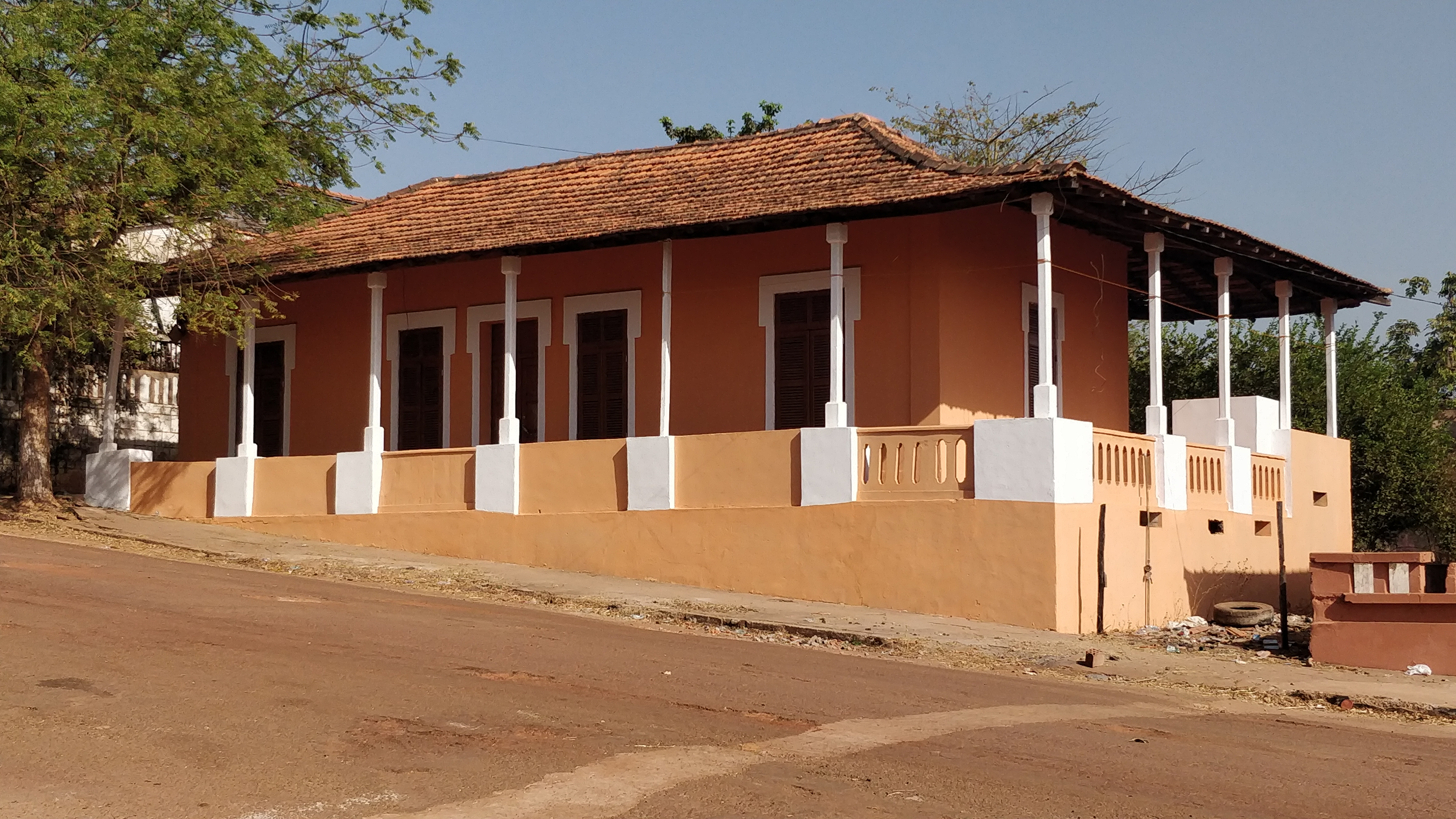
Bafatá, Guinea-Bissau

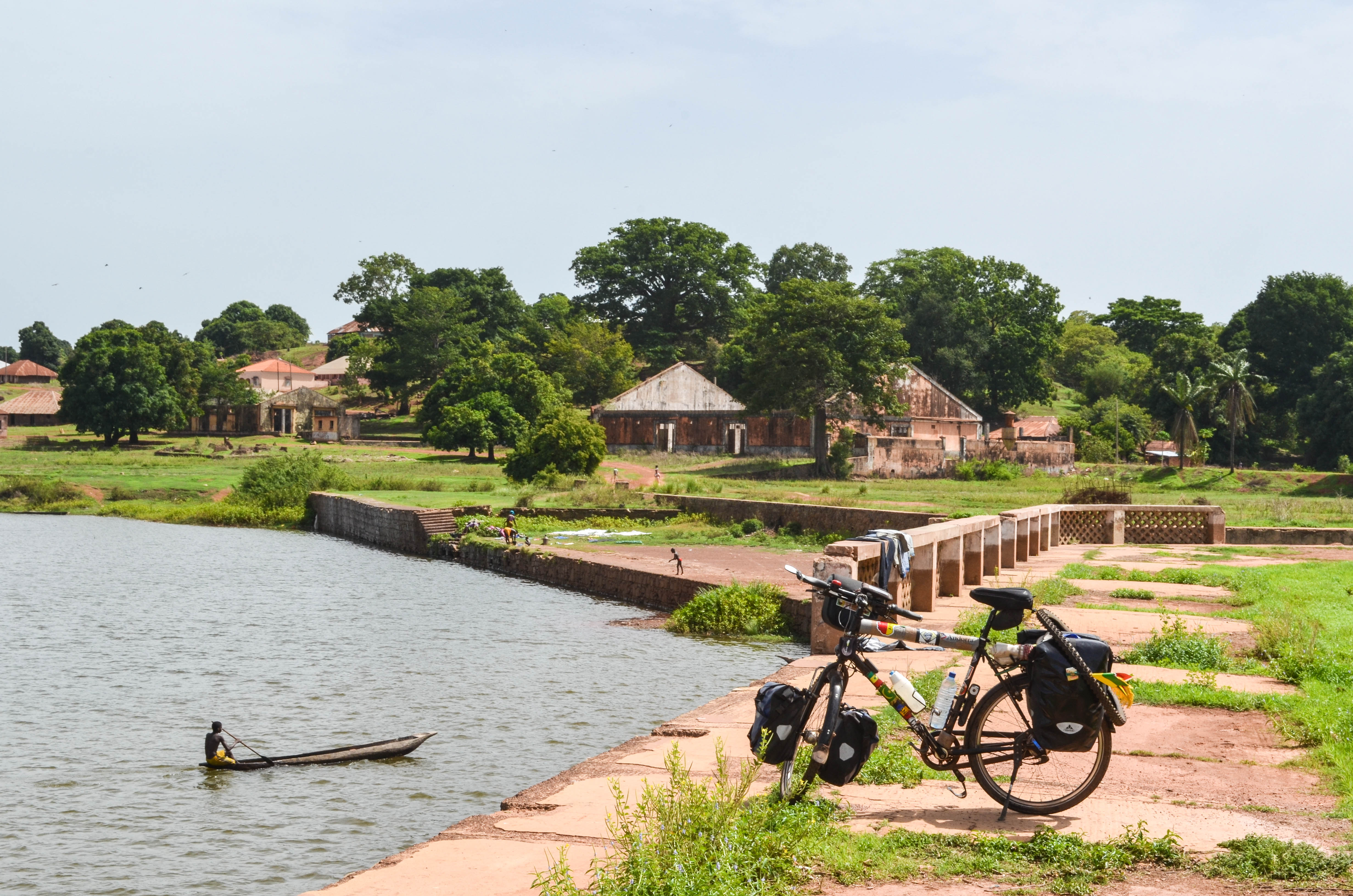
Bafatá, GBW

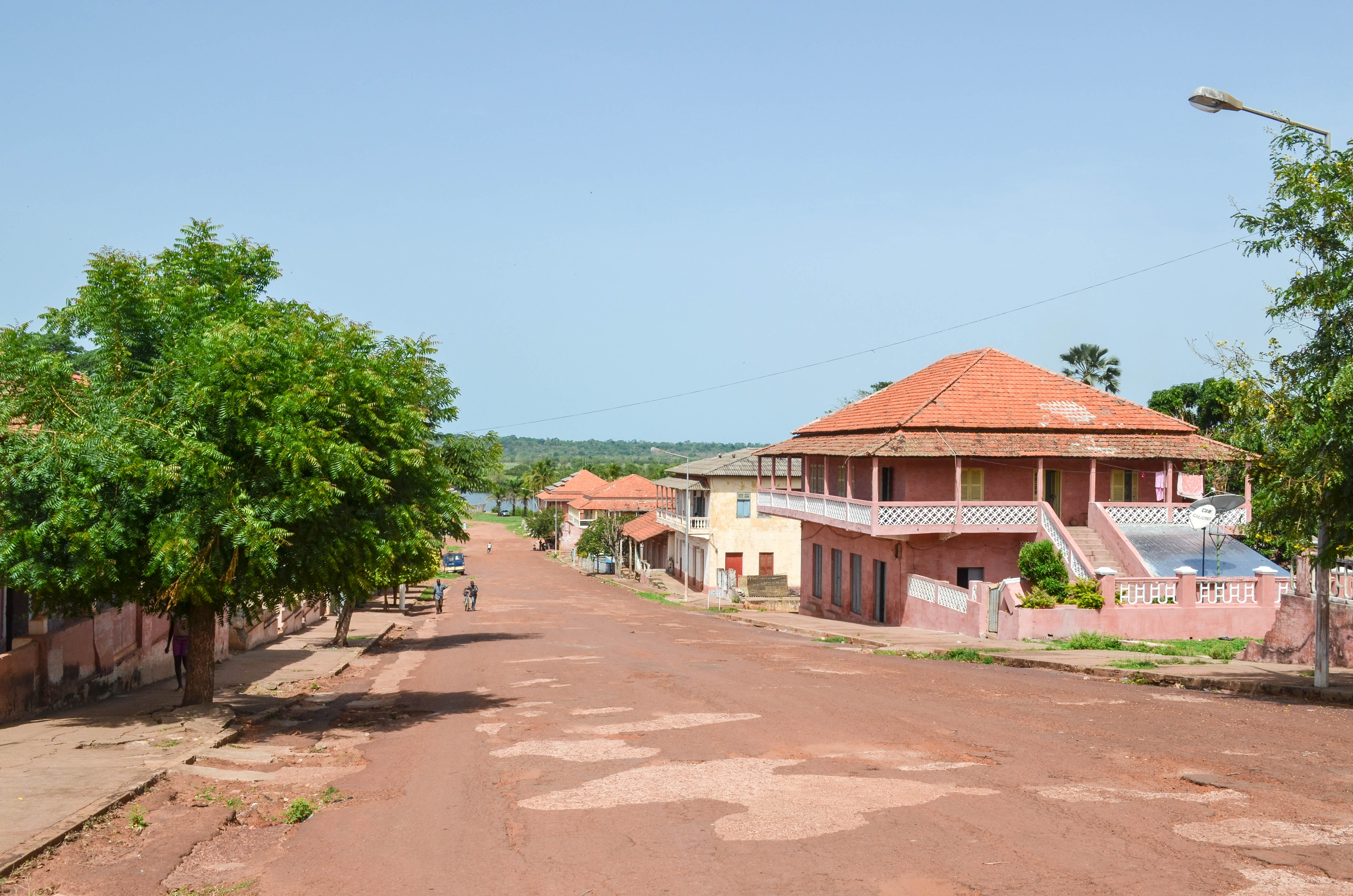
A residential street in Bafatá

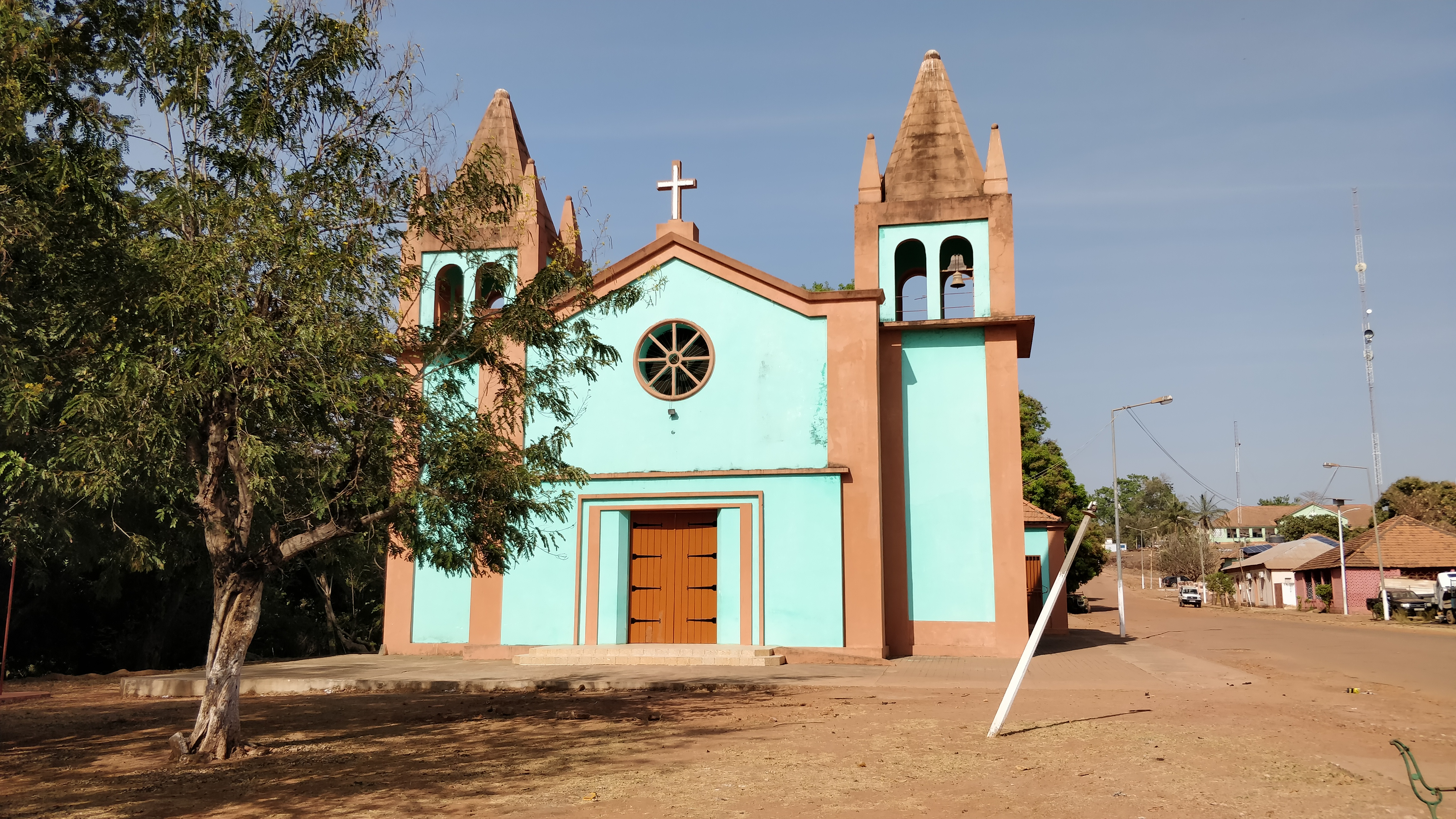
Catedral de Nossa Senhora da Graça church, Downtown Bafatá

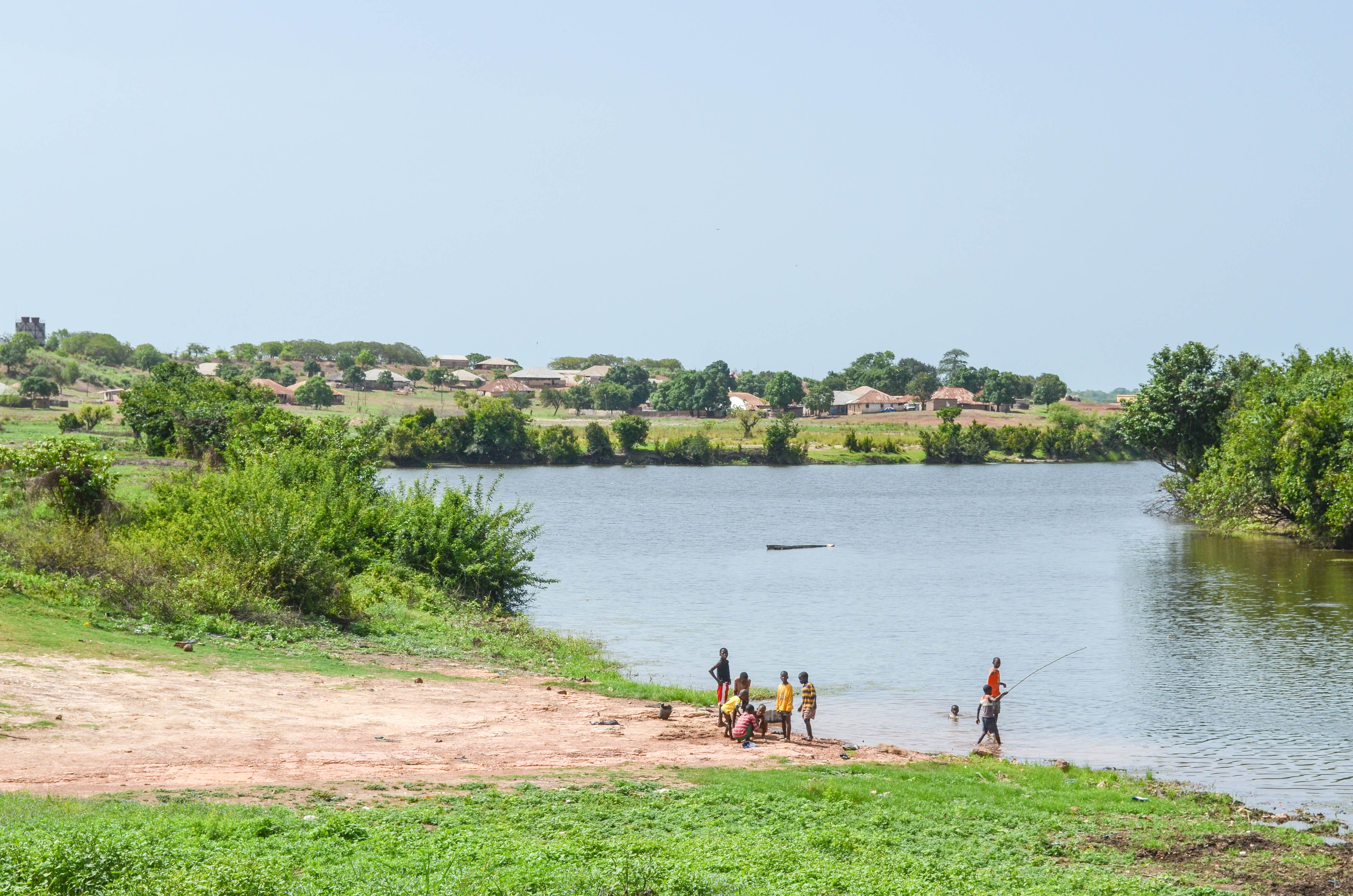
Children playing and fishing in the river

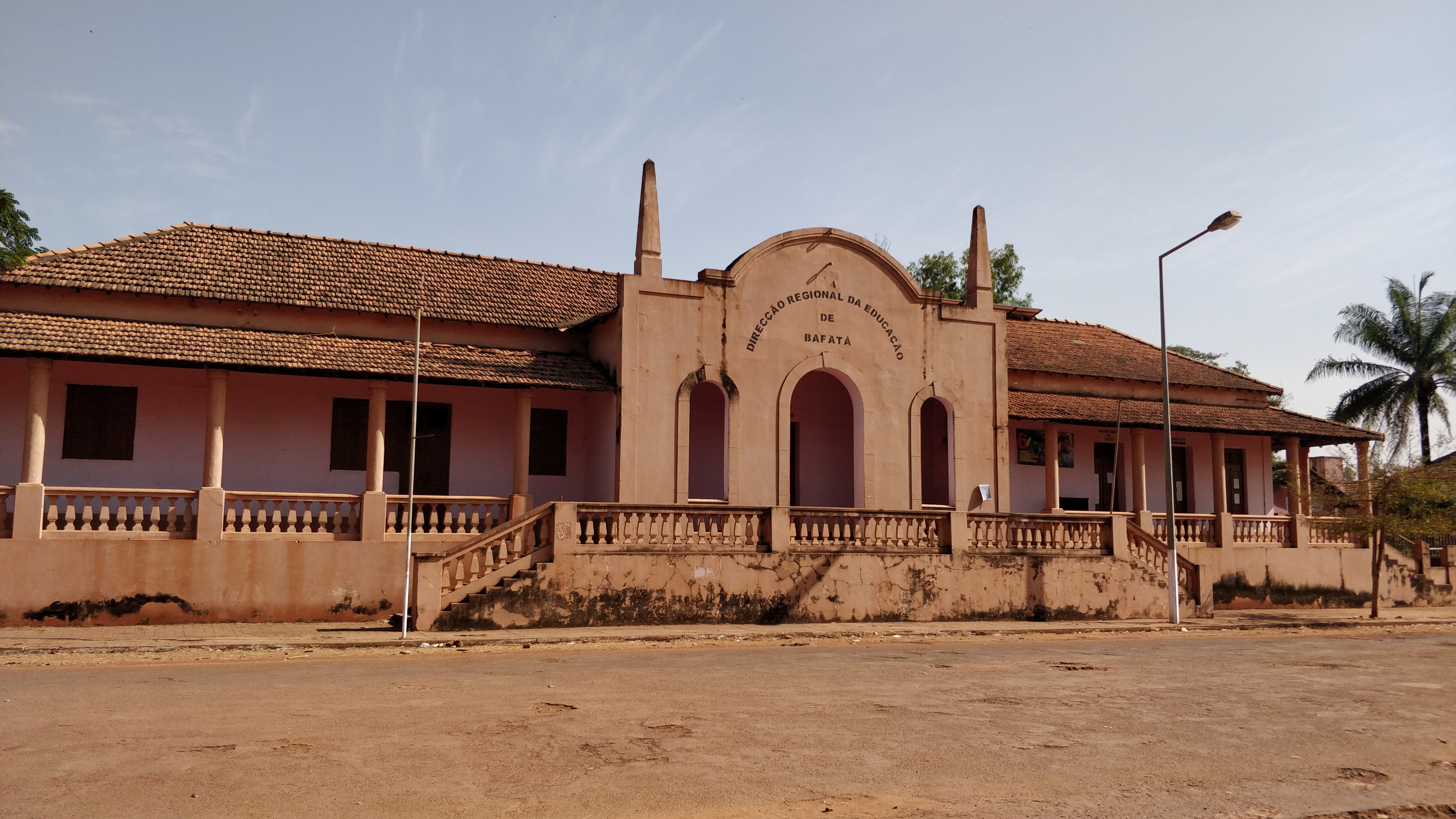
Regional education administration building of Bafatá
