= Camajábà =

- Village
- Location in Guinea-Bissau
- Coordinates: 12°22′N 13°46′W
- Country: Guinea-Bissau
- Region: Gabú Region
- Sector: Piche
- Time zone: UTC+0 (GMT)

Camajábà is a village in the Gabú Region of north-eastern Guinea-Bissau. It lies to the southwest of Buruntuma and west of Piche.
