= Cã Mamudo =

- Village
- Location in Guinea-Bissau
- Coordinates: 12°22′N 14°25′W
- Country: Guinea-Bissau
- Region: Gabú Region
- Sector: Sonaco
- Time zone: UTC+0 (GMT)

Cã Mamudo is a village in the Gabú Region of central-eastern Guinea-Bissau. It lies to the west of Lenquete and southeast of Sonaco.
