= Uelíngarà =

- Village
- Location in Guinea-Bissau
- Coordinates: 12°9′38″N 14°12′15″W
- Country: Guinea-Bissau
- Region: Gabú Region
- Sector: Piche
- Time zone: UTC+0 (GMT)

Uelíngarà is a village in the Gabú Region of north-eastern Guinea-Bissau. It lies to the south of Gabú and north of Canjadude.
