= Carantaba =

- Village
- Location in Guinea-Bissau
- Coordinates: 12°20′N 14°6′W
- Country: Guinea-Bissau
- Region: Gabú Region
- Sector: Piche
- Time zone: UTC+0 (GMT)

Carantaba is a village in the Gabú Region of north-eastern Guinea-Bissau. It lies to the northwest of Piche and northeast of Gabú.
