= Canjia =

- Village
- Location in Guinea-Bissau
- Coordinates: 12°14′2″N 14°25′7″W
- Country: Guinea-Bissau
- Region: Gabú Region
- Sector: Sonaco
- Time zone: UTC+0 (GMT)

Canjia is a village in the Gabú Region of central-eastern Guinea-Bissau. It lies to the east of Uacaba and north of Cansisse.
