= Cansisse =

- Village
- Location in Guinea-Bissau
- Coordinates: 12°11′N 14°22′W
- Country: Guinea-Bissau
- Region: Gabú Region
- Sector: Gabú
- Time zone: UTC+0 (GMT)

Cansisse is a village located in the Gabú Region of central-eastern Guinea-Bissau. It lies to the south of Canjia.
