= Lenquete =

- Village
- Location in Guinea-Bissau
- Coordinates: 12°21′N 14°21′W
- Country: Guinea-Bissau
- Region: Gabú Region
- Sector: Sonaco
- Time zone: UTC+0 (GMT)

Lenquete is a village in the Gabú Region of central-eastern Guinea-Bissau. It lies to the northwest of Gabú.
