= Uacaba =

Uacaba Uacaba Jeeresaa Wakkaaba
- Village
- Location in Guinea-Bissau
- Coordinates: 12°13′N 14°27′W
- Country: Guinea-Bissau
- Region: Gabú Region
- Sector: Sonaco
- Time zone: UTC+0 (GMT)

Uacaba is a village in the Gabú Region of central-eastern Guinea-Bissau. It is located 40 km north-east from Bafatá and 180 km from the capital Bissau, 120 km south-east of Guinea-Bissau – Senegal border. It has a population of 140 people.

== Location ==
It lies between Cancurdo to the west, and Canjia to the east.
