= Cheche =

Cheche may refer to:

- Tagelmust, indigo-dyed cotton garment
- Chéché, village in the Gabú Region of north-eastern Guinea-Bissau
- Action sociale CHECHE, an organization in the Democratic Republic of Congo

== People with the name ==
- Cheche Alara, music director
- Cheche Lázaro, Filipino broadcast journalist
- Cheche Vidal, retired Venezuelan association football defender
