= Canjadude =

- Village
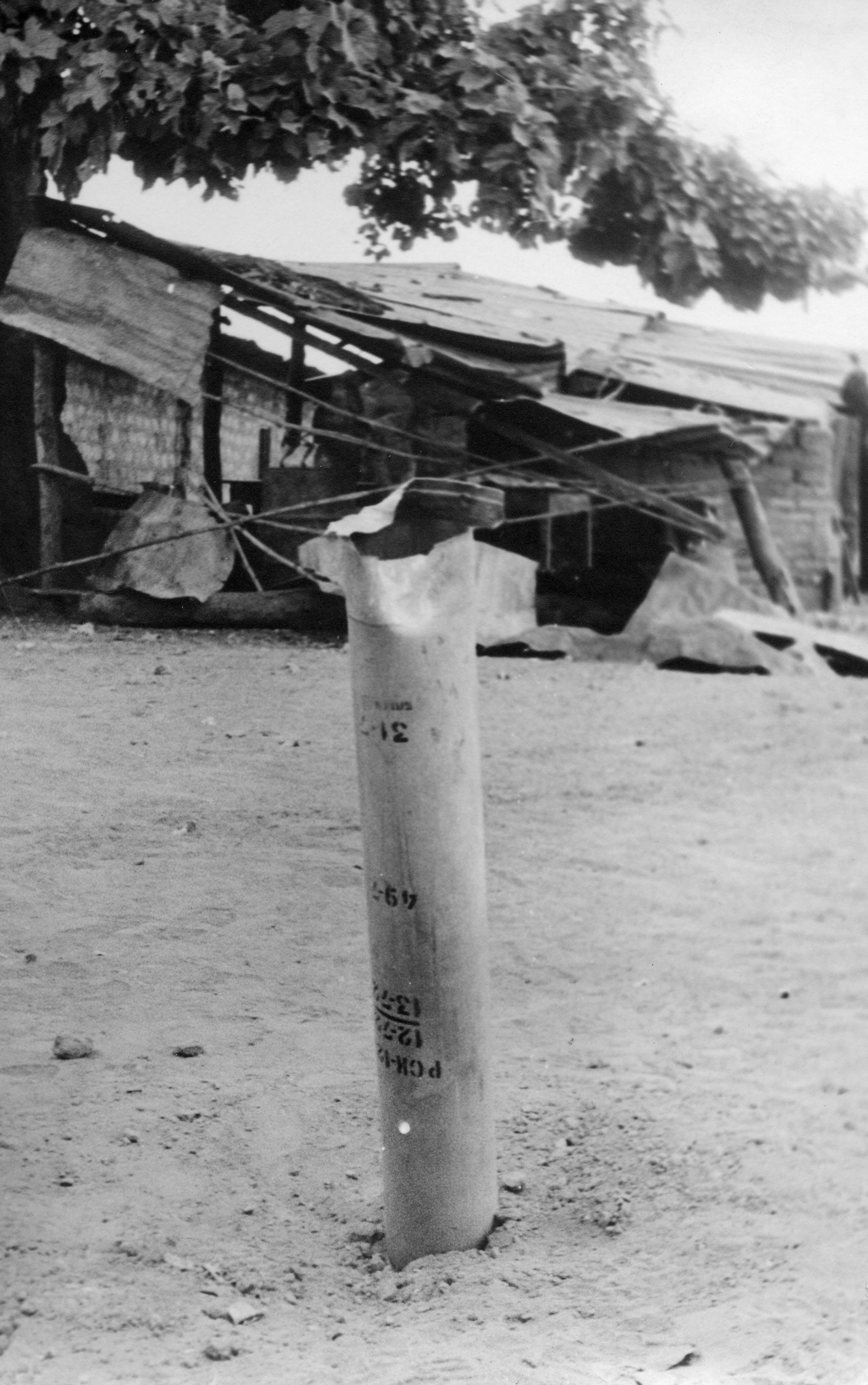
- PAIGC missile in the former Portuguese army barracks of Canjadude, 1973

- Location in Guinea-Bissau
- Coordinates: 12°5′N 14°14′W
- Country: Guinea-Bissau
- Region: Gabú Region
- Sector: Piche
- Time zone: UTC+0 (GMT)

Canjadude is a village in the Gabú sector of the Gabú Region in north-eastern Guinea-Bissau. It lies to the south of Uelíngarà. Canjadude, along with Catió and other camps were besieged by the Portuguese in 1973.
