= Guinea–Guinea-Bissau border =

International border

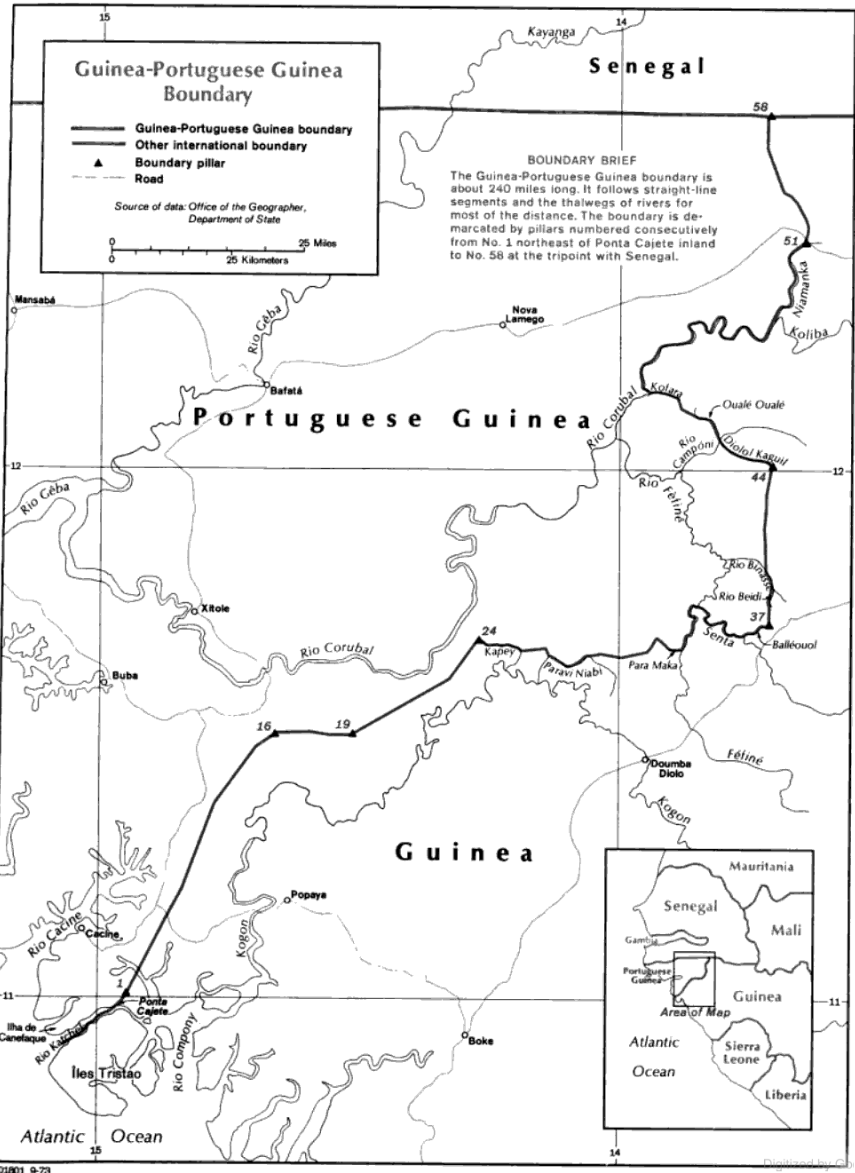
Map of the Guinea–Guinea-Bissau border

The Guinea–Guinea-Bissau border is 421 km (262 mi) in length and runs from the Atlantic Ocean in the south-west to the tripoint with Senegal in the north-east.

== Description ==
The border starts in the southwest at the Atlantic coast near the mouth the Cajet/Inxanche river, just north of Guinea's Tristao Island, and then proceeds overland in a north-easterly direction. Just south of the town of Madina do Boe (Guinea-Bissau) the border reaches a river; the boundary then follows this and several others rivers, such as the Feline and Senta. Near the vicinity of the Guinean town of Bouto Dougaka the border proceeds overland in a northwards directions up to the Ouale river; the border then follows the Ouale and Corubal River in a C-shape, before proceeding overland northwards up to the tripoint with Senegal.

== History ==
Portugal began exploring the coastal areas of modern Guinea-Bissau in the mid-1400s; Bissau was founded in 1765 and became the centre of the Portuguese trade in slaves, gold and ivory in a vaguely defined area along the coast referred to as Portuguese Guinea. France had also taken an interest in the region, settling in the region of modern Senegal in the 17th century and later annexing the coast of what is now Guinea in the late 19th century, creating the Rivières du Sud colony. The area was renamed French Guinea 1893, and was later included within French West Africa.

The 1880s saw an intense competition between the European powers for territories in Africa, a process known as the Scramble for Africa. The process culminated in the Berlin Conference of 1884, in which the European nations concerned agreed upon their respective territorial claims and the rules of engagements going forward. As a result, France and Portugal signed a treaty on 12 May 1886 delimiting a border between their West African colonies (i.e. the current Guinea-Bissau–Senegal border and Guinea-Guinea Bissau border). A joint Franco-Portuguese commission than demarcated the boundary on the ground during the period 1900–05, marking it with 184 numbered pillars (pillars 1-58 covered the French-Guinea-Portuguese Guinea boundary). This final boundary was then approved by an exchange of notes in 1905–06.

French Guinea gained independence from France in 1958 (as Guinea), followed by Portuguese Guinea (as Guinea-Bissau) in 1974 after a prolonged war against Portuguese forces, and the border then became an international one between two sovereign states.

== Settlements near the border ==
=== Guinea ===
- Djarga
- Tanene
- Sansalé
- Gobije
- Dabalare
- Kambera
- Bouto Dougaka
- Foulamory
- Kitiara
- Kandika

=== Guinea-Bissau ===
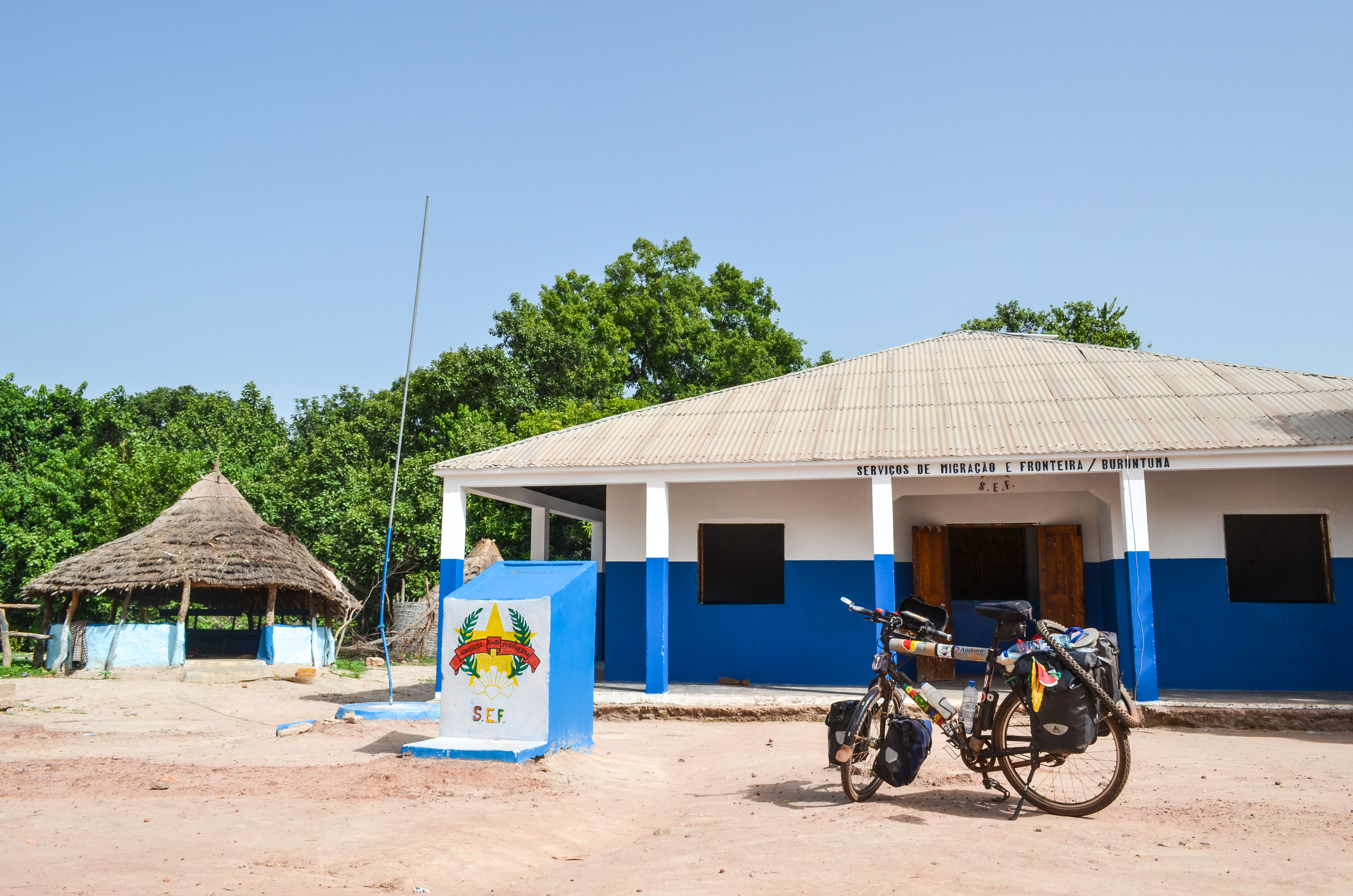
Border post at Buruntuma

- Cameconde
- Ganture
- Sangonha
- Contabane
- Madina Dongo
- Colebe
- Vendu Leidi
- Quissem
- Buruntuma
