= Chéché =

- Village
- Location in Guinea-Bissau
- Coordinates: 11°55′39″N 14°12′52″W
- Country: Guinea-Bissau
- Region: Gabú Region
- Sector: Piche
- Time zone: UTC+0 (GMT)

Chéché or Ché Ché is a village in the Gabú Region of north-eastern Guinea-Bissau. It lies on the south of the Corubal River, to the south of Canjadude. The river crossing was the site of the Cheche Disaster of 6 February 1969, in which about 50 Portuguese soldiers drowned in an accident when their ferry tipped over.
