= Canquelifá =

Canquelifá Kankelefa
- Village
- Location in Guinea-Bissau
- Coordinates: 12°35′N 13°51′W
- Country: Guinea-Bissau
- Region: Gabú Region
- Sector: Piche
- Time zone: UTC+0 (GMT)

Canquelifá, sometimes spelled Kankelefa, is a village in the Gabú Region of north-eastern Guinea-Bissau. It lies to the northwest of Buruntuma.

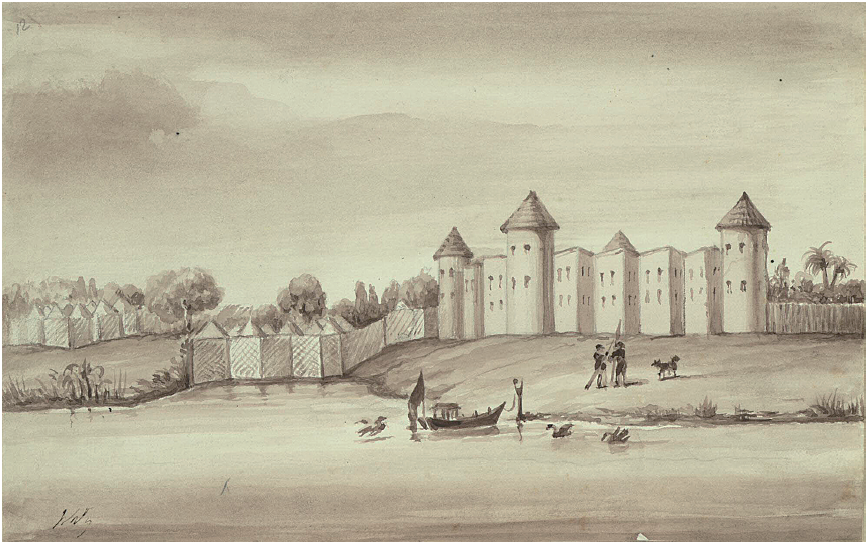
A drawing of the tata of Kankelefa in 1849

Kankelefa was the site of a large tata, the home and power center of the ruler of Paquesi, one of the constituent kingdoms of the Kaabu Empire. It consisted of a series of concentric 12m tall zig-zag walls built of rammed earth, complete with towers.
