= Monte Torin =

Highest elevation in Guinea-Bissau

- Location within Guinea-Bissau

Highest point
- Elevation: 262 m (860 ft)
- Prominence: 118 m (387 ft)
- Coordinates: 11°41′04″N 13°53′18″W

Geography
- Location: Near Capebonde, Guinea-Bissau

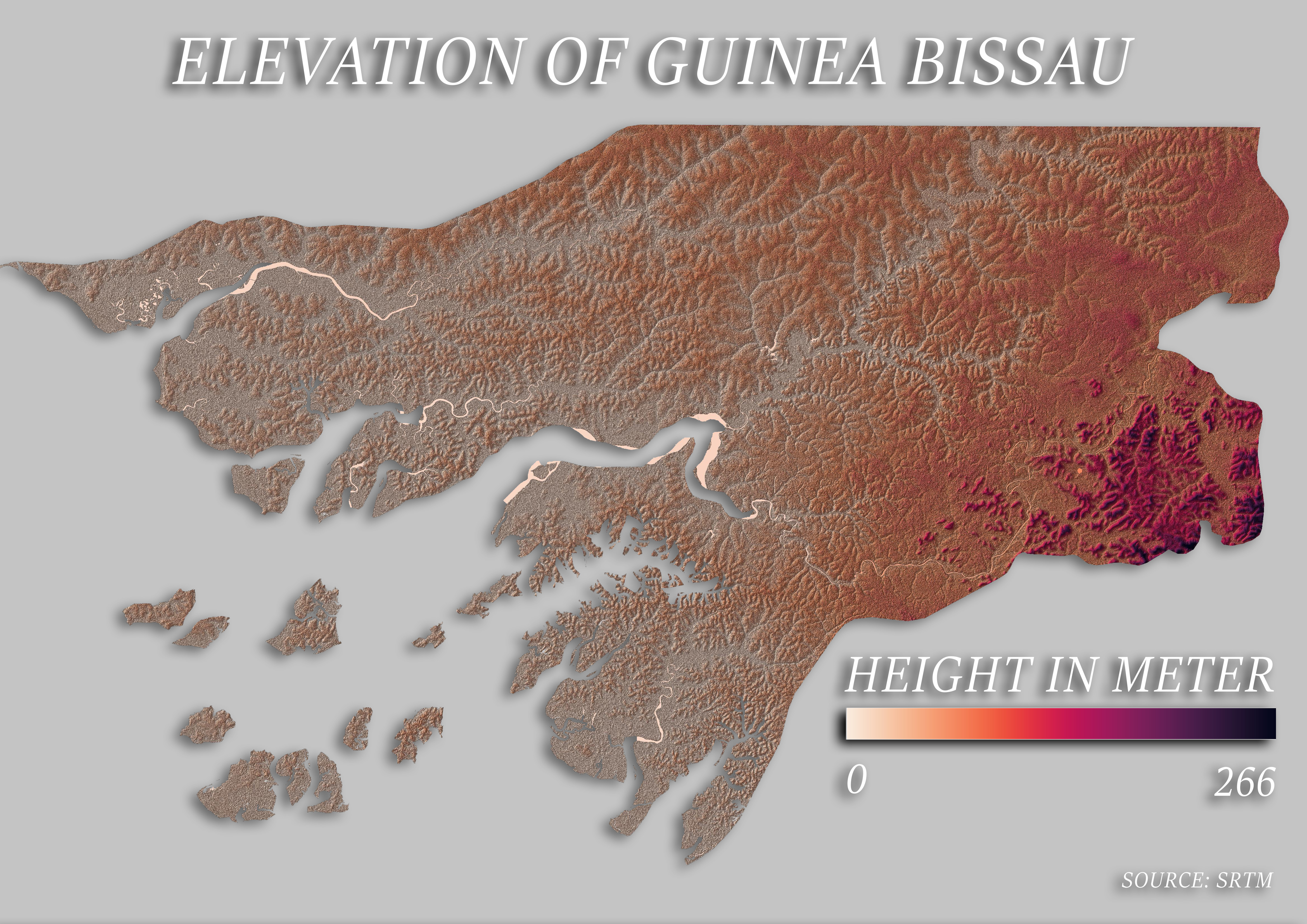
Elevation Map of Guinea-Bissau

Monte Torin is the highest point of Guinea-Bissau, a country in Western Africa, with an elevation of 266 metres (873 ft). The hill is located in the administrative region Gabú, near the southern border with Guinea.

== See also ==
- Geography of Guinea-Bissau
- List of countries by highest point
