= Guinea-Bissau–Senegal border =

International border

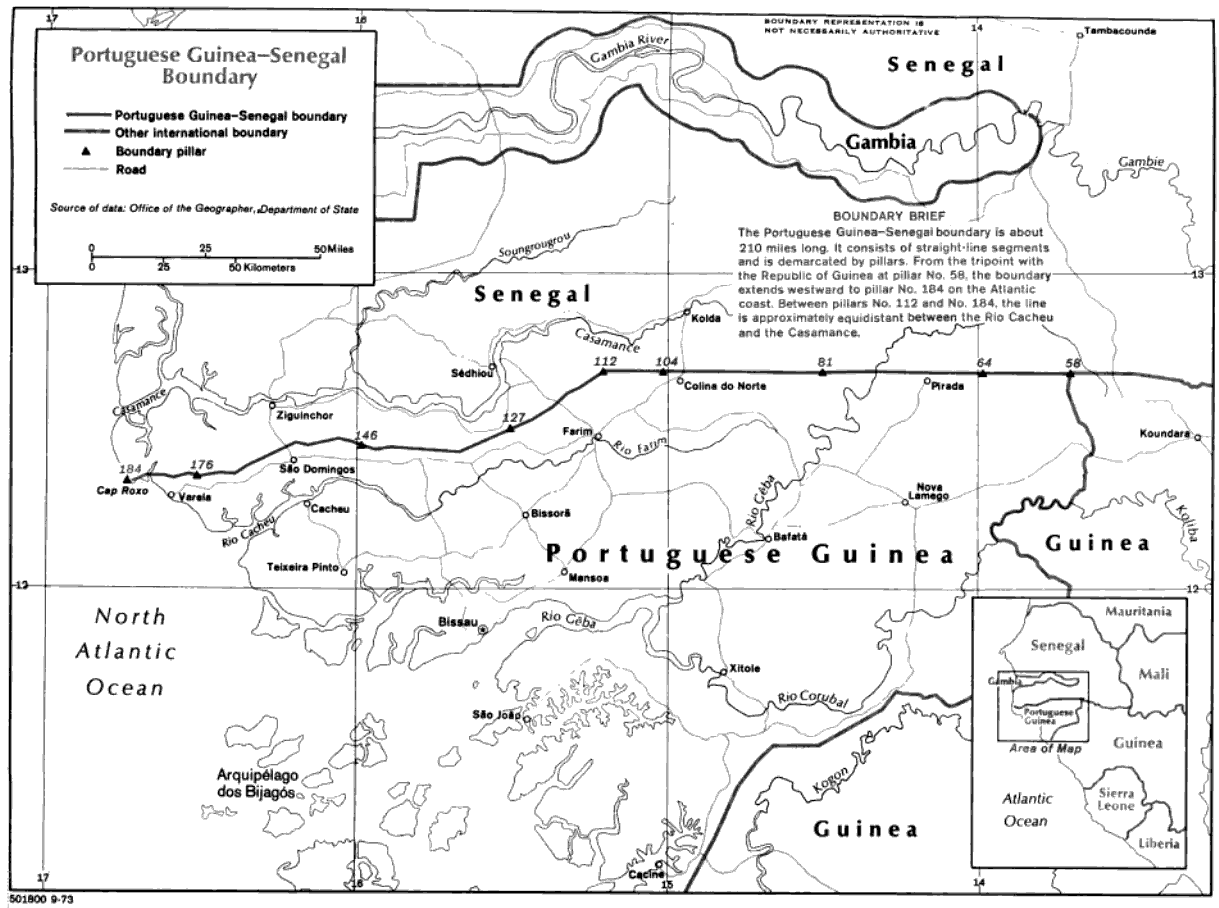
Map of the Guinea-Bissau–Senegal border

The Guinea-Bissau–Senegal border is 341 km (212 mi) in length and runs from the Atlantic Ocean in the west to the tripoint with Guinea in the east.

== Description ==
The border starts in the west at Cape Roxo on the Atlantic coast, and the proceeds overland in a north-easterly directions via a series of irregular and straight lines past the 12th parallel north; at 12°40N it turns east and then follows a straight line to the Guinean tripoint.

== History ==
Portugal began exploring the coastal areas of modern Guinea-Bissau in the mid-1400s; Bissau was founded in 1765 and became the centre of the Portuguese trade in slaves, gold and ivory along a vaguely defined area along the coast referred to as Portuguese Guinea. France had also taken an interest in the region, settling on the coast of modern Senegal in the 17th century; the French gradually extended their rule further inland from the mid-1800s onward.

The 1880s saw an intense competition between the European powers for territories in Africa, a process known as the Scramble for Africa. The process culminated in the Berlin Conference of 1884, in which the European nations concerned agreed upon their respective territorial claims and the rules of engagements going forward. As a result, France and Portugal signed a treaty on 12 May 1886 delimiting a border between their West African colonies (i.e. the modern Guinea-Bissau–Senegal and Guinea–Guinea-Bissau border). A joint Franco-Portuguese commission than demarcated the boundary on the ground during the period 1900–05, marking it with 184 numbered pillars (pillars 58-184 covered the Portuguese Guinea-Senegal boundary). This final boundary was then approved by an exchange of notes in 1905–06.

Senegal gained independence from France in 1960, followed by Portuguese Guinea (as Guinea-Bissau) in 1974 after a prolonged war against Portuguese forces; the border became an international one between two sovereign states. The border region has been used by various armed groups involved in the Casamance conflict and the Guinea-Bissau Civil War in the late 1990s.

== Settlements near the border ==
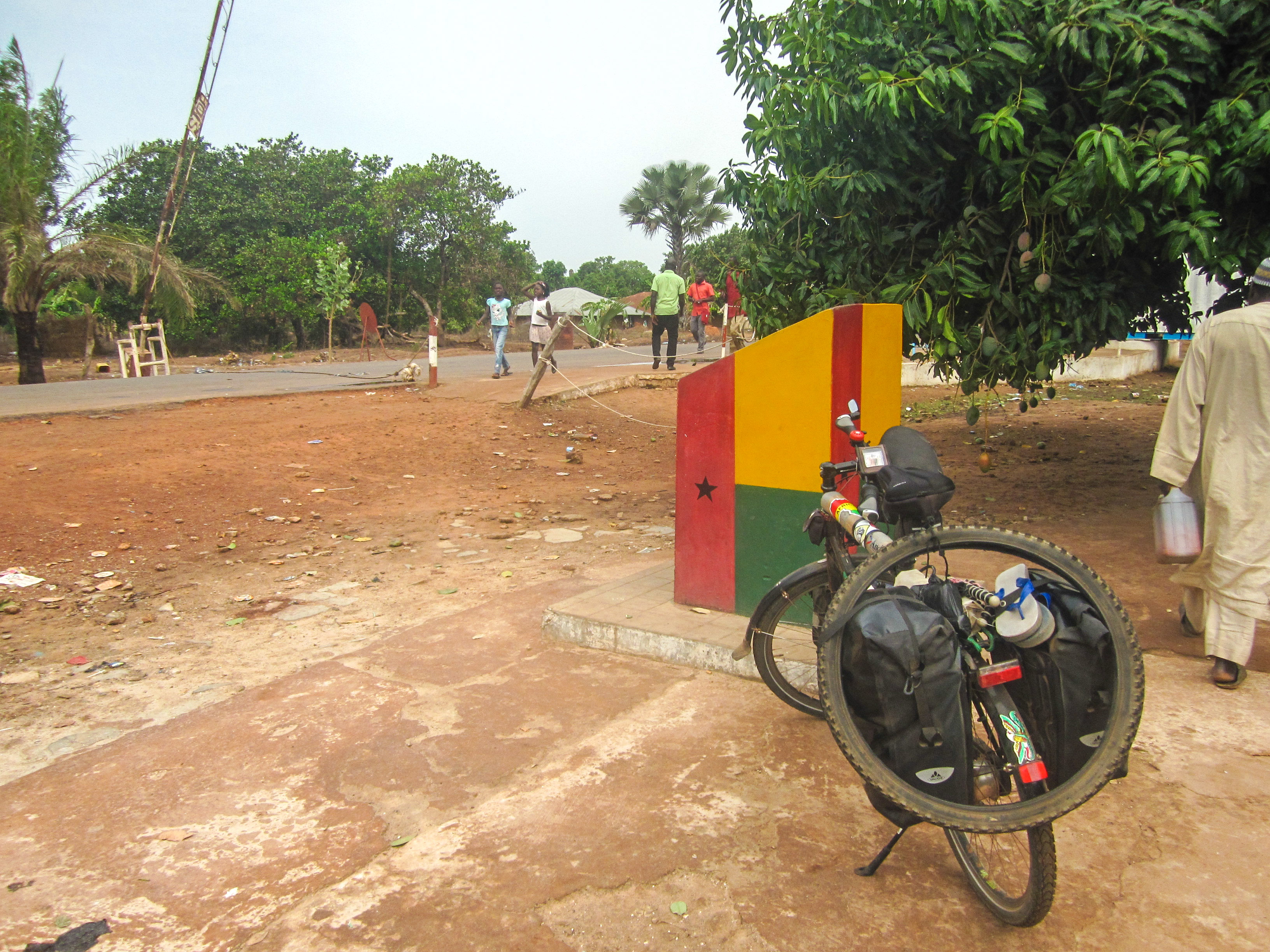
Border crossing

=== Guinea-Bissau ===
- Varela
- Susana
- São Domingos
- Sedendal
- Ingore
- Barro
- Bigene
- Dungal
- Cuntima
- Cambaju
- Sare Bacar
- Pirada

=== Senegal ===
- Kabrousse
- Samine-Escale
- Mpack
- Tanaff
- Kamboua
- Salikenie
- Koumbakara
