= Che Che =

Che Che may refer to:

- Chéché, a village on the Corubal River in Guinea-Bissau
- Che Che Lazaro Presents, a now defunct program of Philippines TV network GMA
- Cheche Lazaro, Filipina TV host
- Che Rosli Che Mat, Malaysian politician and Member of the Parliament of Malaysia for the Hulu Langat constituency.
- Che Uda Che Nik, Malaysian politician and Member of the Parliament of Malaysia for the Sik constituency in Kedah.
