= Buruntuma =

- Village
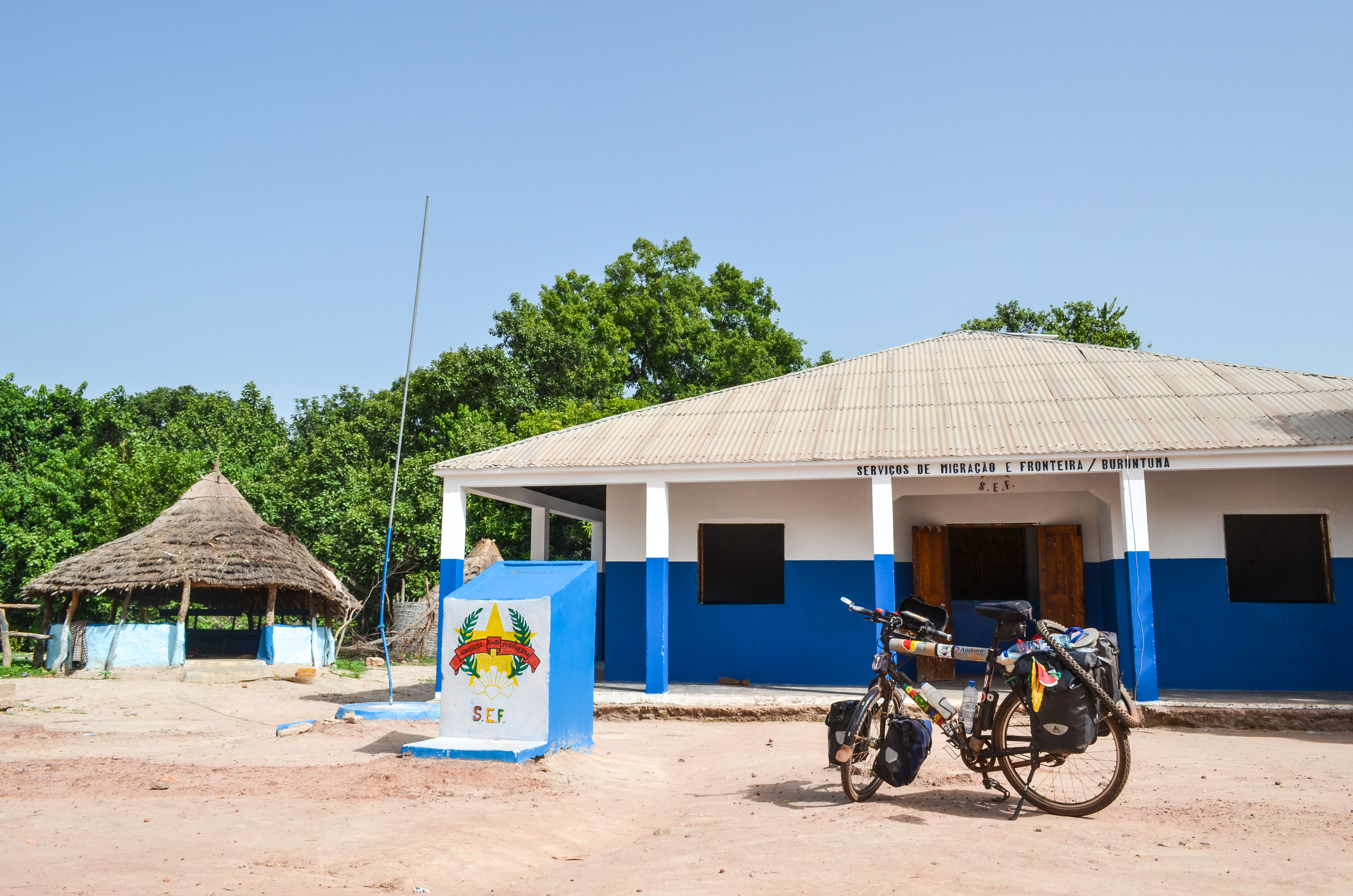
- Border post at Buruntuma

- Location in Guinea-Bissau
- Coordinates: 12°26′N 13°39′W
- Country: Guinea-Bissau
- Region: Gabú
- Sector: Piche
- Time zone: UTC+0 (GMT)

Buruntuma is a village in the Gabú Region of north-eastern Guinea-Bissau. It lies on the border with Guinea, to the southeast of Canquelifá.

== History ==
On 24 February 1970, a group of terrorists attacked Buruntuma with heavy guns and grenades; it became known as the "Buruntuma massacre".
