= United Nations Security Council Resolution 273 =

UN Security Council Resolution 273
- Date: December 9 1969
- Meeting no.: 1,520
- Code: S/RES/273 (Document)
- Subject: Complaints by Senegal
- Voting summary: 13 voted for; None voted against; 2 abstained
- Result: Adopted

Security Council composition
- Permanent members: China; France; Soviet Union; United Kingdom; United States
- Non-permanent members: Algeria; Colombia; Finland; Hungary; Nepal; Pakistan; Paraguay; Senegal; Spain; Zambia

United Nations Security Council Resolution 273, was adopted on December 9, 1969, after a complaint from Senegal regarding the shelling of the Senegalese village of Samine from a Portuguese base in Begene, the Council condemned the action and called upon Portugal to desist from violating the sovereignty and territorial integrity of Senegal.

The resolution was adopted by 13 votes to none; Spain and the United States abstained.

== See also ==
- List of United Nations Security Council Resolutions 201 to 300 (1965–1971)
