= Geography of Guinea-Bissau =

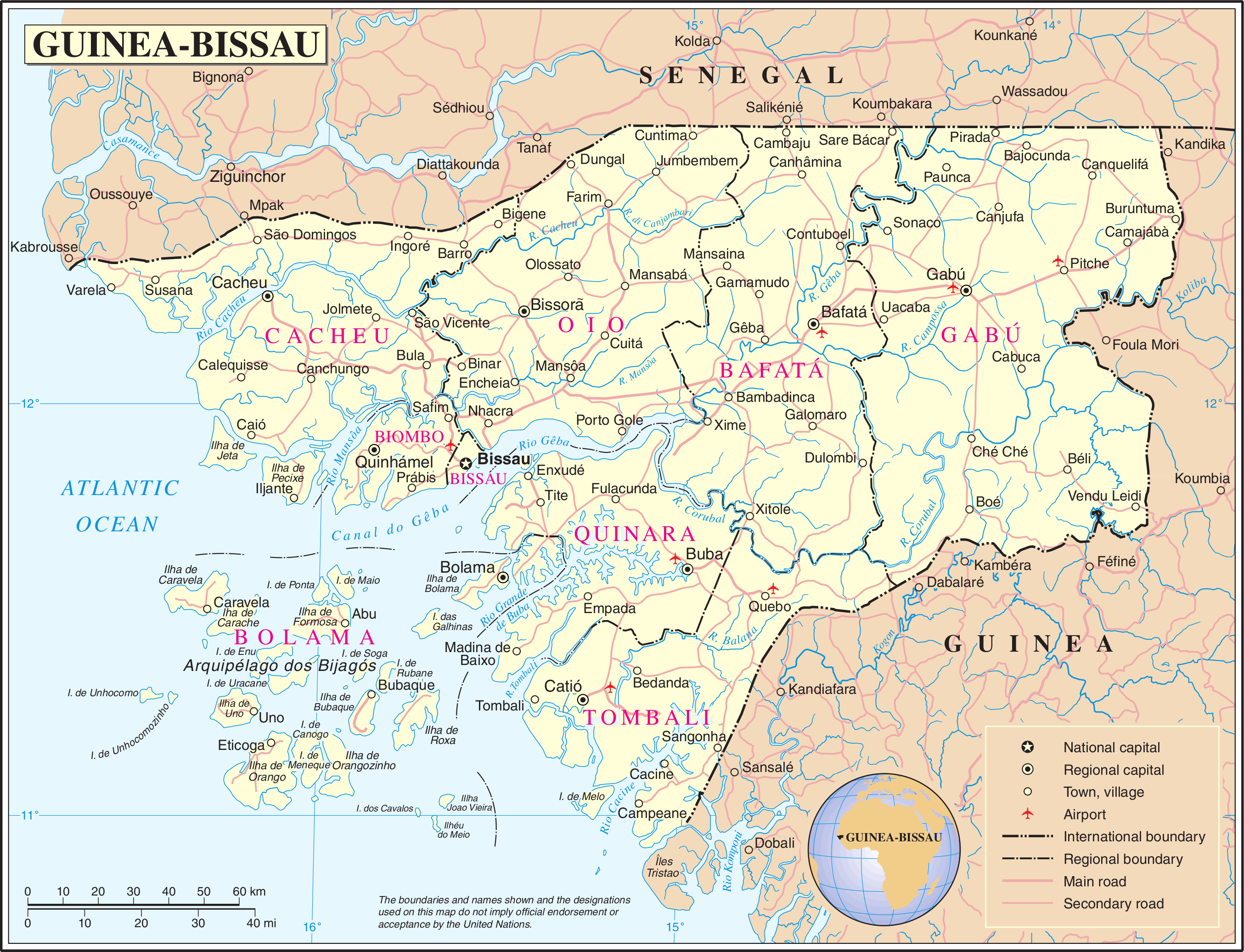
A map of Guinea Bissau

Location of Guinea Bissau

The geography of Guinea-Bissau is that of low coastal plains bordering the Atlantic Ocean. The country borders Senegal in the north and Guinea in the southeast.

== Terrain and ecology ==
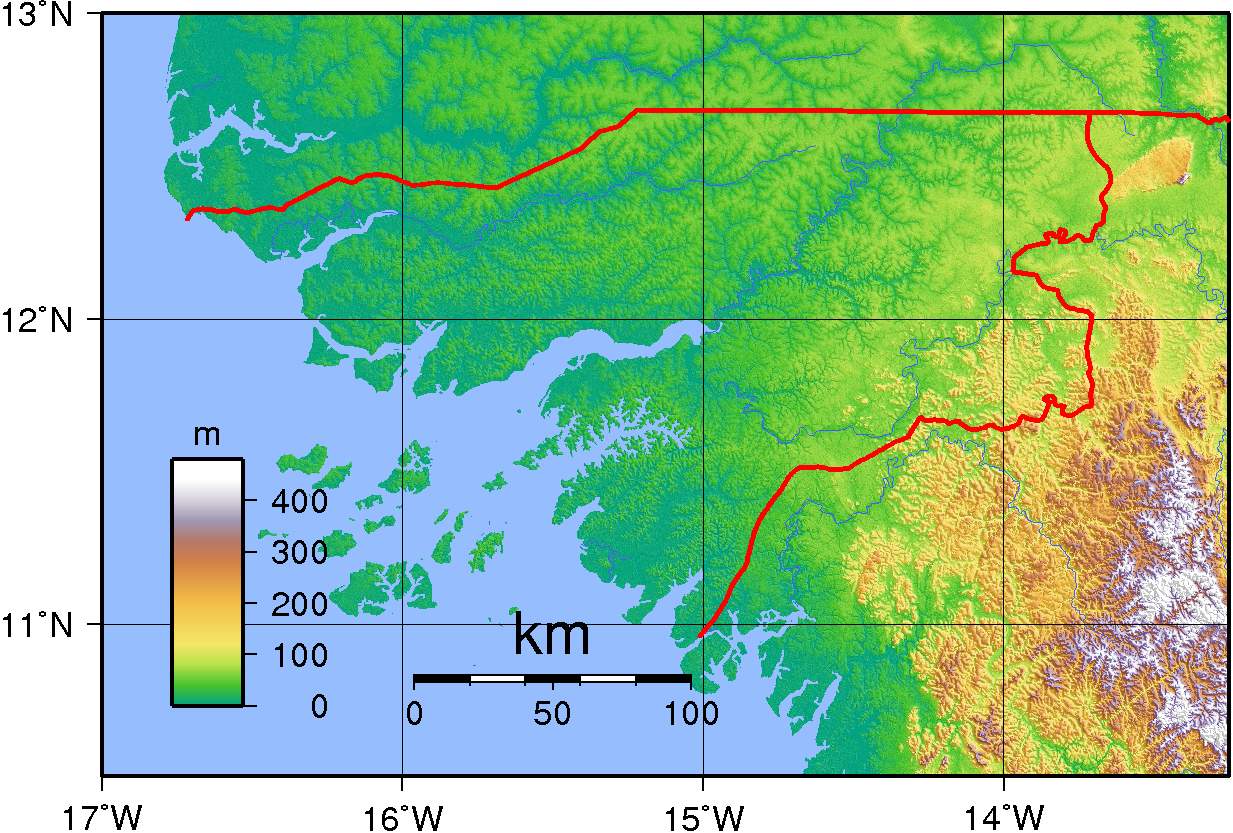
Guinea-Bissau's topography.

The terrain of Guinea-Bissau is mostly low coastal plain with swamps of Guinean mangroves rising to Guinean forest-savanna mosaic in the east. A recent global remote sensing analysis suggested that there were 1,203km² of tidal flats in Guinea-Bissau, making it the 28th ranked country in terms of tidal flat area.

Around 66 million years ago, an asteroid impact occurred 400 km off the west-African coast. The 2022 discovered Nadir buried Crater has a diameter of 9 km. The impact caused an earthquake of 6.5 magnitude and created a 1 km high tsunami. The combined forces could be an explanation for the extremely scarred coastline of Guinea-Bissau.

The lowest point on Guinea-Bissau is at sea level at the Atlantic Ocean. The highest point in Guinea-Bissau is Dongol Ronde with an elevation of 277 m (909 ft). The Conservation Atlas of Tropical Forests: Africa authored in 1992 cites Fouta Djallon at 262 m (860 ft) as the highest.

Natural resources found in Guinea-Bissau include fish, timber, phosphates, bauxite, clay, granite, limestone and unexploited deposits of petroleum. 10.67% of the land is arable and 235.6 square kilometres are irrigated.

Natural hazards include a hot, dry, dusty harmattan haze that may reduce visibility during the dry season and brush fires. Severe environmental issues include deforestation; soil erosion; overgrazing and overfishing.

Near the Senegal border there have been historic sightings of the painted hunting dog, Lycaon pictus, but that endangered canid may now be extirpated in that locale.

== Climate ==
Guinea-Bissau's climate is tropical. This means it is generally hot and humid. It has a monsoonal-type rainy season (June to November) with southwesterly winds and a dry season (December to May) with northeasterly harmattan winds.

Köppen–Geiger climate classification map at 1-km resolution for Guinea-Bissau (1991–2020)

Guinea-Bissau is warm all year around and there is little temperature fluctuation; it averages 26.3 °C (79.3 °F). The average rainfall for the capital city Bissau is 2,024 millimetres (79.7 in) although this is almost entirely accounted for during the rainy season which falls between June and September/October. From December through April, the country receives very little rainfall.

Climate data for Bissau, Guinea-Bissau (1974–1994)
Month	Jan	Feb	Mar	Apr	May	Jun	Jul	Aug	Sep	Oct	Nov	Dec	Year
Record high °C (°F)	36.7 (98.1)	38.3 (100.9)	38.9 (102.0)	41.1 (106.0)	39.4 (102.9)	35.6 (96.1)	33.3 (91.9)	32.8 (91.0)	33.9 (93.0)	34.4 (93.9)	35.0 (95.0)	35.6 (96.1)	41.1 (106.0)
Mean daily maximum °C (°F)	31.1 (88.0)	32.8 (91.0)	33.9 (93.0)	33.3 (91.9)	32.8 (91.0)	31.1 (88.0)	29.4 (84.9)	30.0 (86.0)	30.0 (86.0)	31.1 (88.0)	31.7 (89.1)	30.6 (87.1)	31.5 (88.7)
Daily mean °C (°F)	24.4 (75.9)	25.6 (78.1)	26.6 (79.9)	27.0 (80.6)	27.5 (81.5)	26.9 (80.4)	26.1 (79.0)	26.4 (79.5)	26.4 (79.5)	27.0 (80.6)	26.9 (80.4)	24.8 (76.6)	26.3 (79.3)
Mean daily minimum °C (°F)	17.8 (64.0)	18.3 (64.9)	19.4 (66.9)	20.6 (69.1)	22.2 (72.0)	22.8 (73.0)	22.8 (73.0)	22.8 (73.0)	22.8 (73.0)	22.8 (73.0)	22.2 (72.0)	18.9 (66.0)	21.1 (70.0)
Record low °C (°F)	12.2 (54.0)	13.3 (55.9)	15.6 (60.1)	16.7 (62.1)	17.2 (63.0)	19.4 (66.9)	19.4 (66.9)	19.4 (66.9)	19.4 (66.9)	20.0 (68.0)	15.0 (59.0)	12.8 (55.0)	12.2 (54.0)
Average rainfall mm (inches)	0.5 (0.02)	0.8 (0.03)	0.5 (0.02)	0.8 (0.03)	17.3 (0.68)	174.8 (6.88)	472.5 (18.60)	682.5 (26.87)	434.9 (17.12)	194.8 (7.67)	41.4 (1.63)	2.0 (0.08)	2,022.8 (79.63)
Mean monthly sunshine hours	248	226	279	270	248	210	186	155	180	217	240	248	2,707
Source 1: Sistema de Clasificación Bioclimática Mundial
Source 2: World Climate Guides (sunshine only)

== Tree cover extent and loss ==
Global Forest Watch publishes annual estimates of tree cover loss and 2000 tree cover extent derived from time-series analysis of Landsat satellite imagery in the Global Forest Change dataset. In this framework, tree cover refers to vegetation taller than 5 m (including natural forests and tree plantations), and tree cover loss is defined as the complete removal of tree cover canopy for a given year, regardless of cause.

For Guinea-Bissau, country statistics report cumulative tree cover loss of 219,051 ha (2,190.51 km^{2}) from 2001 to 2024 (about 20.5% of its 2000 tree cover area). For tree cover density greater than 30%, country statistics report a 2000 tree cover extent of 1,069,852 ha (10,698.52 km^{2}). The charts and table below display this data. In simple terms, the annual loss number is the area where tree cover disappeared in that year, and the extent number shows what remains of the 2000 tree cover baseline after subtracting cumulative loss. Forest regrowth is not included in the dataset.

Annual tree cover loss in Guinea-Bissau, 2001–2024. View chart definition.
Tree cover extent in 2000 minus cumulative tree cover loss in Guinea-Bissau, 2001–2024 (loss-only residual; does not account for gain). View chart definition.

Annual tree cover extent and loss
Year	Tree cover extent (km2) (Note: This residual measure does not include forest regrowth.)	Annual tree cover loss (km2)
2001	10,674.89	23.63
2002	10,614.16	60.73
2003	10,603.95	10.21
2004	10,568.55	35.40
2005	10,529.26	39.29
2006	10,509.07	20.19
2007	10,448.63	60.44
2008	10,416.14	32.49
2009	10,336.50	79.64
2010	10,287.50	49.00
2011	10,244.66	42.84
2012	10,209.54	35.12
2013	10,002.50	207.04
2014	9,873.91	128.59
2015	9,747.31	126.60
2016	9,586.11	161.20
2017	9,421.73	164.38
2018	9,277.79	143.94
2019	9,121.56	156.23
2020	8,950.49	171.07
2021	8,813.64	136.85
2022	8,715.83	97.81
2023	8,601.03	114.80
2024	8,508.01	93.02

=== REDD+ reference level and monitoring ===
Under the UNFCCC REDD+ framework, Guinea-Bissau has submitted a subnational forest reference emission level (FREL). On the UNFCCC REDD+ Web Platform, the country's 2019 submission for the terrestrial component of the National System of Protected Areas is listed as having an assessed reference level, while the other Warsaw Framework elements - a national strategy, safeguards, and a national forest monitoring system - are listed as "not reported".

The FREL was submitted in 2019 and technically assessed in 2020. It covers the REDD+ activity "reducing emissions from deforestation" and applies to the terrestrial component of the National System of Protected Areas, an area of about 750,000 hectares, or roughly 26 percent of the national territory. Using a 2007-2015 reference period, the assessed benchmark was 67,805.50 t CO2 eq per year. The technical assessment states that it represents the annual average of CO2 emissions from gross deforestation and was presented as an interim step towards a future national FREL.

The submission applies the FAO forest definition of land larger than 0.5 hectares with trees capable of reaching more than 5 metres in height and canopy cover of at least 10 percent, excluding predominantly agricultural or urban land. It includes above-ground biomass and below-ground biomass and reports CO2 only, while excluding deadwood, litter, soil organic carbon and non-CO2 gases. Although the REDD+ Web Platform lists the national forest monitoring system as "not reported", the modified submission states that a forest monitoring system and safeguards information system were being piloted in the protected-areas system.

== Information from the CIA World Factbook ==
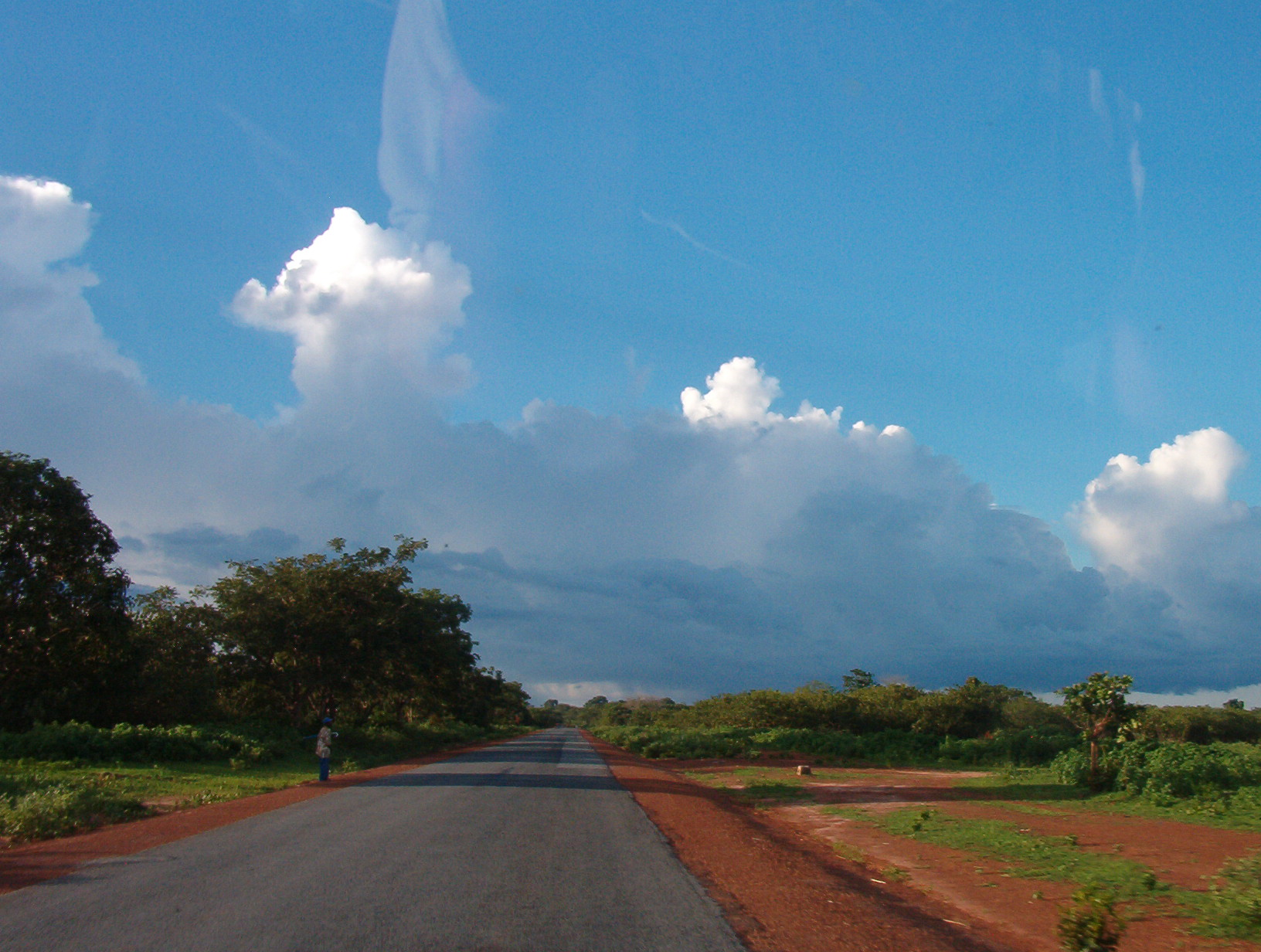
Typical scenery in Guinea-Bissau.

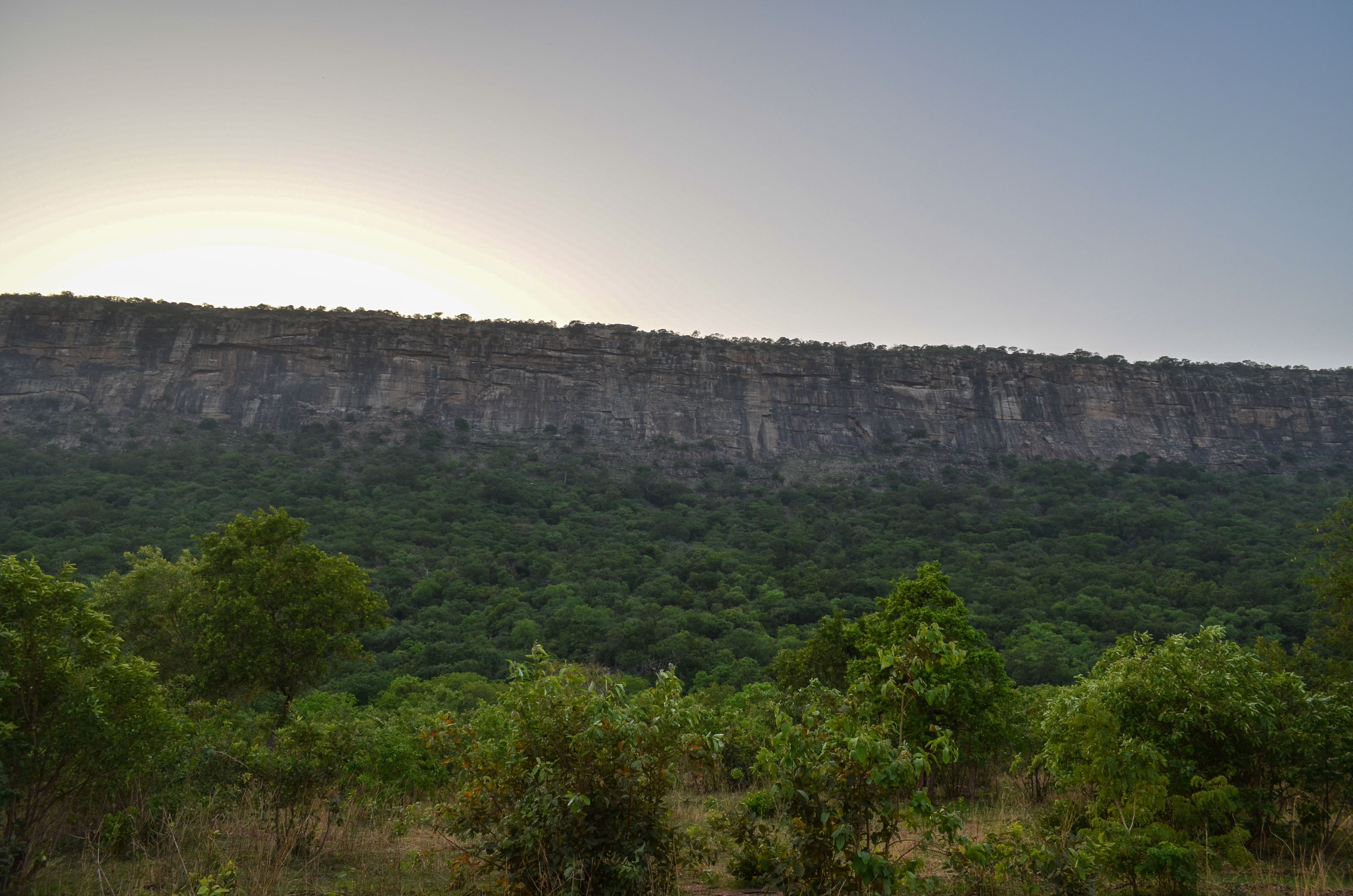
Eastern Guinea-Bissau High plain mountains near the border with Guinea

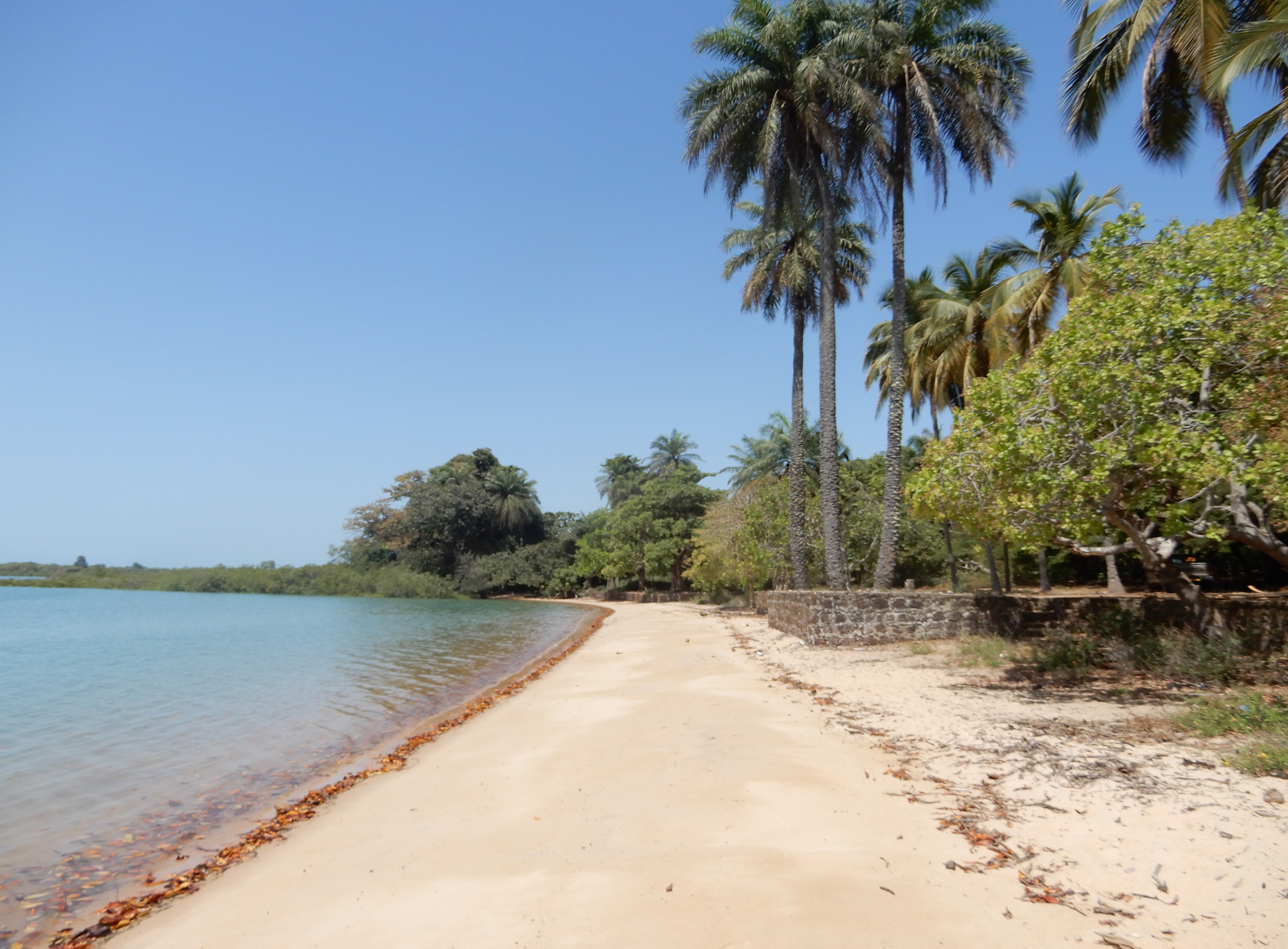
Praia de Ofir, Bijagós Islands, Guinea-Bissau

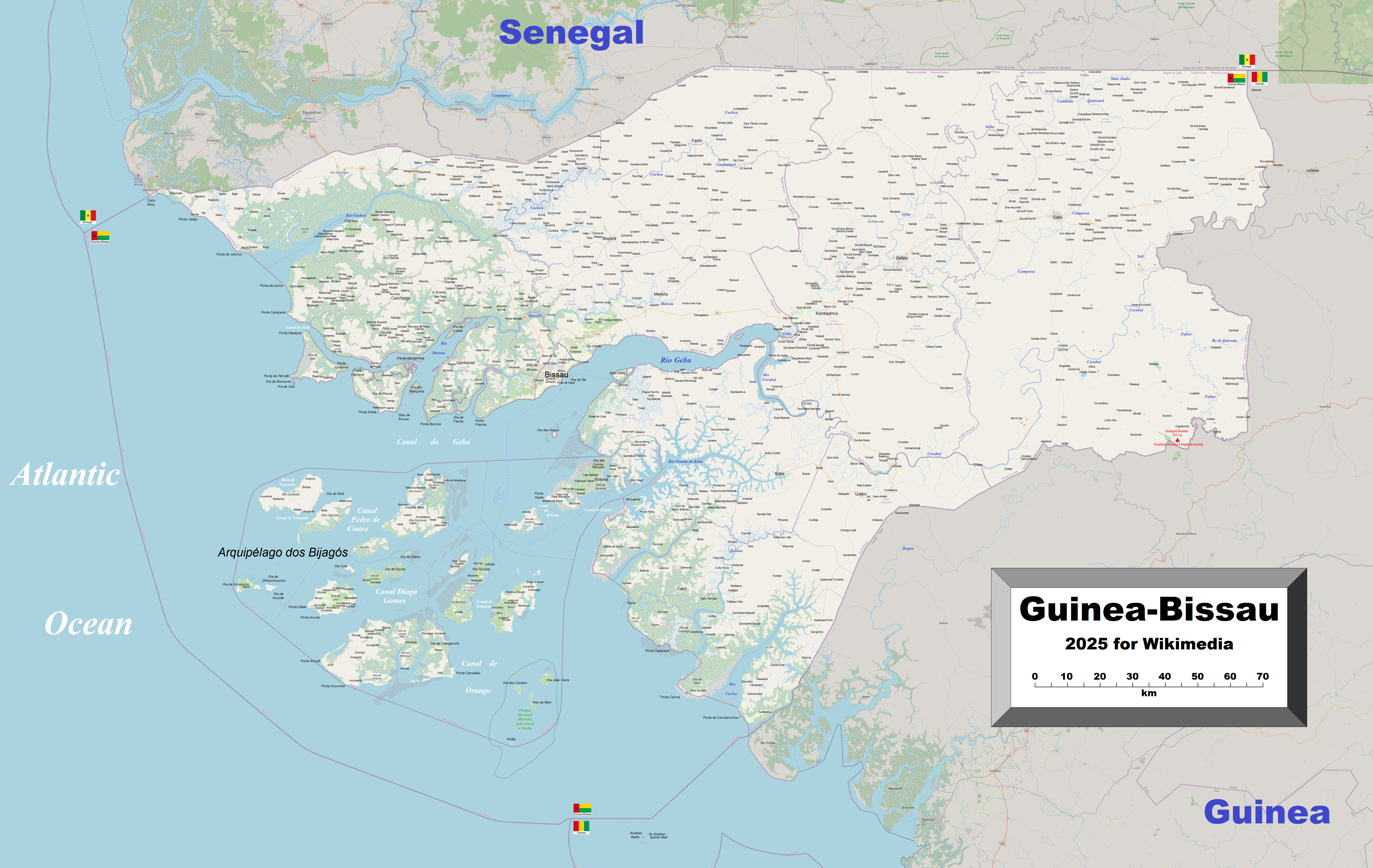
Detailed map of Guinea-Bissau.

Location
Western Africa, bordering the North Atlantic Ocean, between Guinea and Senegal
Geographic coordinates
12°00′N 15°00′W
Map references
Area
- Total: 36,125 km²
  - country rank in the world: 134th
- Land: 28,120 km²
- Water: 8,005 km²

Area comparative
- Australia comparative: slightly more than 1/2 the size of Tasmania
- Canada comparative: approximately 1/2 the size of New Brunswick
- United Kingdom comparative: approximately 3/5 larger than Wales
- United States comparative: approximately 1/8 larger than Maryland
- EU comparative: slightly more than 1/2 the size of Ireland
Land boundaries
- Total: 762 km
- Border countries: Guinea 421 km, Senegal 341 km
Coastline
350 km
Maritime claims
- Territorial sea: 12 nmi (22.2 km; 13.8 mi)
- Exclusive economic zone: 200 nmi (370.4 km; 230.2 mi)
Terrain
Mostly low coastal plain rising to savanna in east
Elevation extremes
- Lowest point: Atlantic Ocean 0 m
Natural resources
Fish, timber, phosphates, bauxite, unexploited deposits of petroleum
Land use
- Arable land: 10.67%
- Permanent crops: 8.89%
- Other: 80.44% (2012 est.)
Irrigated land
223.6 km^{2} (2003)
Total renewable water resources
31 km^{3}
Freshwater withdrawal (domestic/industrial/agricultural)
- Total: 0.18 km^{3}/yr (18%/6%/76%)
- Per capita: 135.7 m^{3}/yr (2005)
Natural hazards
Hot, dry, dusty harmattan haze may reduce visibility during dry season; brush fires
Environment—current issues
Deforestation; soil erosion; overgrazing; overfishing
Environment—international agreements
- Party to: Biodiversity, Climate Change, Desertification, Endangered Species, Hazardous Wastes, Law of the Sea, Ozone Layer Protection, Wetlands
- Signed, but not ratified: None of the selected agreements

== Extreme points ==
This is a list of the extreme points of Guinea-Bissau, the points that are farther north, south, east or west than any other location.

- Northernmost point – the northern section of the border with Senegal*
- Easternmost point – unnamed location on the border with Guinea immediately south-west of the Guinean village of Sofan, Gabú Region
- Southernmost point – unnamed headland on Ilha Cataque, Tombali Region
- Westernmost point - Cape Roxo at the point where the border with Senegal enters the Atlantic Ocean, Cacheu Region
- Highest point in Guinea-Bissau - unnamed location in the southeastern region, elevation approximately 300 meters (984 feet) above sea level.

Located near the border with Guinea, in the Bafatá / Gabu region; Guinea-Bissau is a very low-lying country, so even its highest point is modest compared to neighbors.

- Lowest point in Guinea-Bissau - Atlantic Ocean coastline, elevation 0 meters (sea level).The country has a long, low coast with mangroves, estuaries, and tidal flats.
- *Note: Guinea-Bissau does not have a northernmost point, the border here being formed by a parallel of latitude.
