= Pirada =

Coordinates: 12°40′N 14°10′W

Pirada is a Sector in the Gabú Region of Guinea-Bissau. It is a town and an administrative division (sector) in the northeast area of Guinea-Bissau with an area of 934.4 km² and a population of 2,629. Pirada is near the country's border with Senegal and is very sparsely populated, with only 35 people per square kilometer.
