= Cheche Disaster =

Coordinates: 11.931102°N 14.213288°W

- Location of Chéché in Portuguese Guinea
- Location: Chéché, Portuguese Guinea
- Date: 6 February 1969
- Fatalities: 47 Portuguese soldiers, 5 Guinean militia
- Cause: Ferry tipping

The Cheche Disaster (Portuguese: Desastre do Cheche) was an incident during the Portuguese Colonial War in Portuguese Guinea (now Guinea-Bissau) in which almost fifty Portuguese soldiers died on 6 February 1969 while crossing the Corubal River.

== Background ==
When Brigadier António de Spínola came to Guinea in 1968 as Governor and Commander in Chief, he decided to evacuate the Portuguese troops in the east of the country, which was thinly populated and of no strategic value. The camp at Madina do Boé was surrounded and was suffering constant attacks by the PAIGC guerillas of Amílcar Cabral. The position was untenable. It was occupied by PAIGC forces the same day that the Portuguese evacuated it. The retreating force included Caçadores ("Hunters") company 1790, commanded by Captain José Aparício, more troops from company 2405 and Guinean militia.

Moving the troops, vehicles and equipment over 22 kilometres (14 mi) to Chéché, on the south bank of the Corubal River, was a difficult operation but was completed successfully. On the afternoon of 5 February 1969 the force began to use two ferries to cross the river from south to north. With repeated trips, 100 tons of equipment and ammunition, 28 heavy vehicles and about 500 men made the crossing. The ferries were rafts about 4 by 6 metres (13 by 20 ft). The wooden platforms were supported by canoes and empty diesel barrels, and pulled by a boat with an outboard engine.

== Incident ==
By the early morning of the 6 February only the rearguard of 100 to 120 men remained on the south shore. These men all piled onto one raft to make the last crossing. In the middle of the river, the raft tipped to one side, throwing several men into the water, then tipped to the other side, throwing more men in. The raft was seriously overloaded, with the weight poorly distributed.

The tipping may have been triggered by an explosion creating a panic. However, one survivor says there was no firing, and another pointed out that the troops were accustomed to mortar fire and would not have reacted. Another possibility is that the boat pulling the raft accelerated too fast.

Wearing boots and uniform, weighed down with arms and ammunition, many of the men sank immediately. When the raft reached the other bank the extent of the disaster was realised: 47 Portuguese soldiers and five Guinean militia from the Madina do Boé garrison had died.

== Aftermath ==
About two weeks later, an operation was launched using marines and navy divers to try to recover the bodies, which were already in an advanced state of decomposition. Many were not recovered; those that were received a formal military burial beside the river.

In February 2010 a team of researchers from the Faculty of Science and Technology in the University of Coimbra exhumed and tried to identify the bodies of between fifteen and seventeen of the soldiers who had been buried in a mass grave 300 metres (980 ft) from the river. The skeletons were in poor condition due to the very high humidity levels, complicating the job of separating and identifying them. The exhumation was promoted by the League of Combatants of Portugal (Liga dos Combatentes de Portugal) under a program named "Conservation of Memories".

== Notes and references ==
Citations

Sources

- Firmino, Teresa (25 March 2010). "A última jangada no rio Corubal". Público (Portugal).
- Firmino, Teresa (26 March 2010b). "À procura dos militares afogados no rio Corubal". Público (Portugal).
- "Investigadores de Coimbra vão exumar restos mortais de combatentes". Novas da Guiné Bissau. 19 February 2010. Archived from the original on 2 January 2011.
- Matos Gomes, Carlos; Afonso, Aniceto (2009). Os Anos da Guerra Colonial. Vol. 10: 1969 - Acreditar na vitória. Matosinhos: QuidNovi.
- Moura, Marlene (2010-02-18). "Desastre de Cheche: "Dignificar morte" de antigos combatentes". CiênciaHoje.
- Oliveira, Manuel (23 September 2012). "Memórias da Guerra Colonial - "A partir daqui a minha vida mudou por completo"". Clube de Cultura e Desporto de Ribeirão.
