= Action sociale CHECHE =

Coordinates: 2°30′3.01″S 28°51′5.14″E

CHECHE BUKAVU
- Established: 1963; 63 years ago
- Headquarters: Place de l’indépendance, BUKAVU.
- Location: Bukavu, Democratic Republic of Congo
- Directeur Général: Père Cyrille KAZWALA SJ.
- Chef de département Automobile Moderne.: Gabriel KARINGU MBEMBA.
- Key people: Père Derider
- Parent organization: Compagnie de Jésus
- Affiliations: Jesuit, Catholic
- Formerly called: ACTION SOCIALE CHECHE

Action sociale CHECHE, is a work training center located in Bukavu, Democratic Republic of Congo, founded by a Jesuit priest in 1963. It seeks to prepare for a useful trade youth who have left school or find themselves unemployed. It is a project of the Central African Province of the Society of Jesus.

== Origin ==
CHECHE ("SPARK") was launched in 1963 by Fr. Cronenberghs. Initially, he was tasked with looking for ways to give work to idle youth, who had failed to complete secondary school and who had not found employment. He offered workshops and courses in carpentry, mechanics, and construction, preparing highly qualified workers. Six other Jesuits joined Cronenberghs who remained with the program over 50 years.

== Current ==
CHECHE has been listed second among the top schools in Bukavu.

== See also ==
- List of Jesuit sites
