= Bigene =

Sector of Cacheu Region, Guinea-Bissau

- Sector
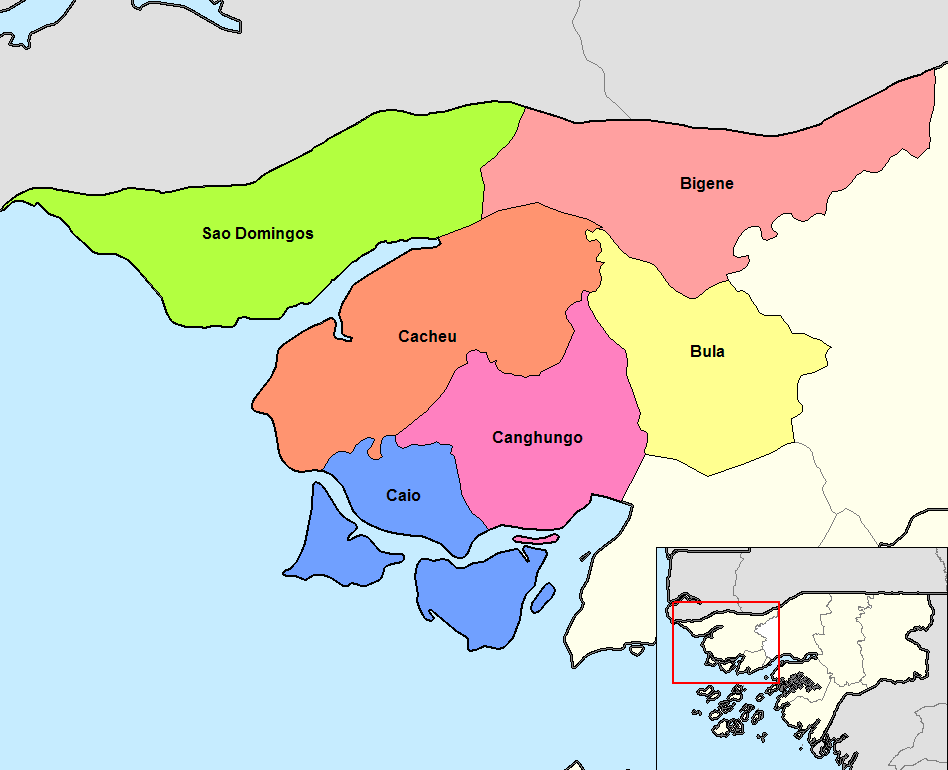
- A map showing the sectors of Guinea-Bissau; Bigene is on the top right in pink.
- Interactive map of Bigene
- Coordinates: 12°26′24″N 15°32′30″W
- Country: Guinea-Bissau
- Region: Cacheu

Bigene is a sector in the Cacheu Region of Guinea-Bissau.

== History ==
In December, 1969, Bigene was referenced in United Nations Security Council Resolution 273, after Portugal had used the sector to shell villages in Senegal. At the time, Guinea-Bissau was still a territory of the Portuguese Empire.
