= Boe, Guinea-Bissau =

Boe
- Location in Guinea-Bissau
- Coordinates: 11°45′N 14°13′W
- Country: Guinea-Bissau
- Region: Gabú Region

Population
  - Total: 12,000 (region)

Boe (full name Madina do Boe) is a settlement in the southeastern Gabú Region of Guinea-Bissau. The population consists mostly of Fulani herders. Although geologically rich in bauxite, the mineral deposits have not been exploited to any great degree due to the ecological sensitivity of the surrounding Boé National Park.

== History ==
The Boe area was pivotal during the war of independence that would eventually end the colonial regime in Portuguese Guinea. On 6 February 1969, rebel forces ousted the colonial garrison (known as the Companhia de Caçadores 1790) from Boe. The men retreated north and needed to cross the Corubal River 22 km away. There, in what became known as the Cheche Disaster, 47 Portuguese soldiers and five of the local Boe garrison were killed when one of the overloaded river-rafts capsized.

Boe was the site where the 2nd Congress of the PAIGC was held in July 1973 and where independence was declared on September 24, 1973. Boe itself briefly served as the de facto capital until Guinea-Bissau's independence was finally recognised in 1974, following the Carnation Revolution in Lisbon. Thereafter, Bissau was declared the national capital of the newly independent country and Boe returned to relative obscurity.
