= Corubal River =

River of West Africa, major tributary of the Geba River

Corubal
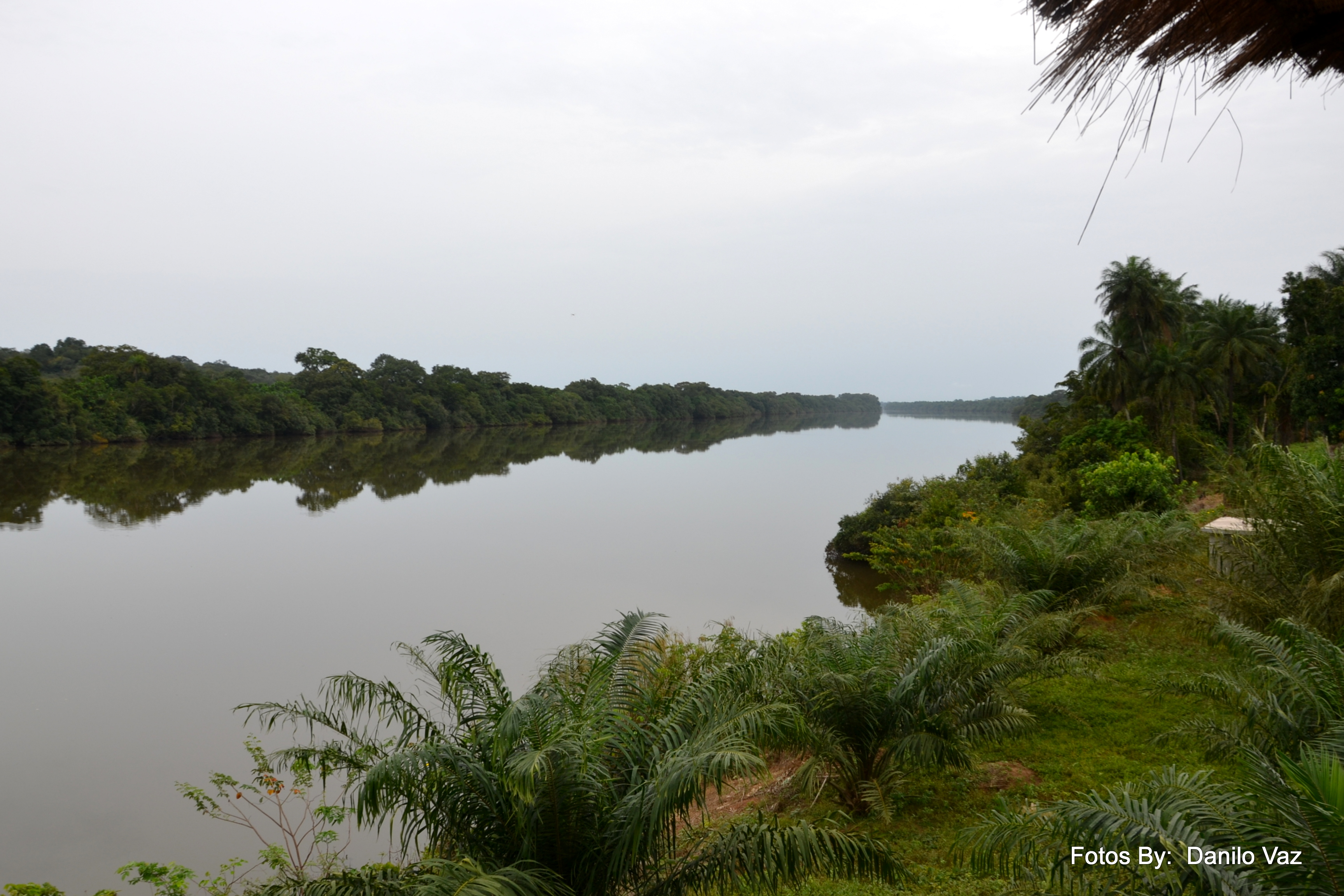

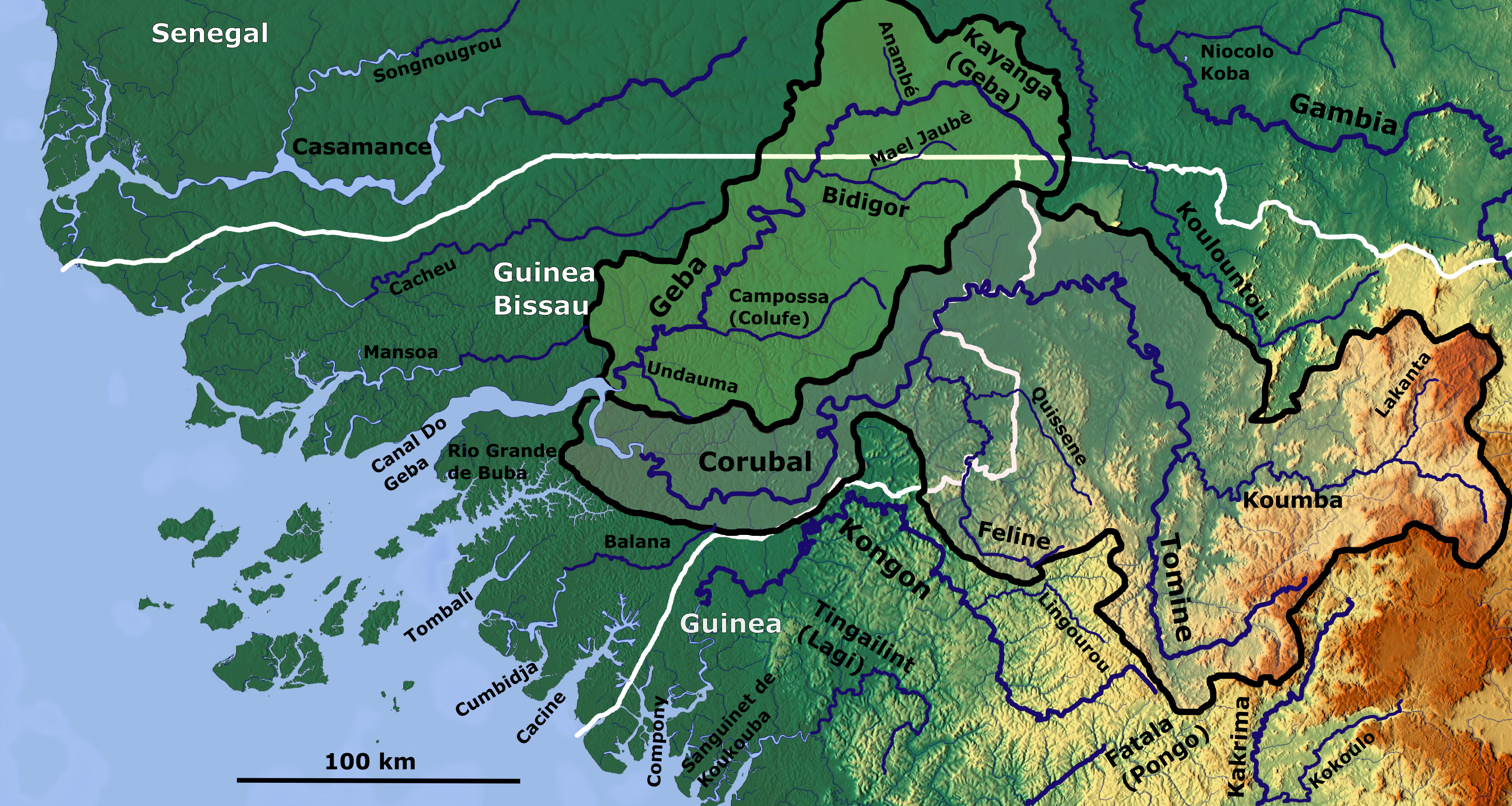
- Map of Senegal, Guinea and Guinea-Bissau with the catchment area of Geba (light green)

Location
- Countries: Guinea; Guinea-Bissau

Physical characteristics
- Source
  - location: Fouta Djallon, Guinea
- Mouth
  - location: Canal do Geba, Guinea-Bissau
- Length: 561 km (349 mi)
- Basin size: 24,399.9 km^{2} (9,420.9 mi^{2})
- Discharge
  - location: Near mouth
  - average: (Period: 1979–2015) 17.52 km^{3}/a (555 m^{3}/s) (Period: 1971–2000) 330.7 m^{3}/s (11,680 cu ft/s)
- Discharge
  - location: Saltinho (Basin size: 23,840 km^{2} (9,200 sq mi)
  - average: (Period: 1977–1994)304 m^{3}/s (10,700 cu ft/s)
  - minimum: 5.4 m^{3}/s (190 cu ft/s)
  - maximum: 1,600 m^{3}/s (57,000 cu ft/s)

Basin features
- River system: Corubal River
- Tributaries
  - left: Tomine, Feline
  - right: Koumba

The Corubal, also known as the Rio Corubal or Tomine, is a river of West Africa, a major tributary of the Geba River. For a short distance, it forms the international border between Guinea and Guinea-Bissau. It has a length of approximately 560 kilometres (350 mi).

== History ==
The Corubal formed the border between Kaabu and the Imamate of Futa Jallon in the late 18th and early 19th centuries.

During the Portuguese Colonial War in February 1969, the Portuguese army, while retreating from territories in the Madina do Boe sector, lost 47 soldiers to drowning when their overloaded raft tipped to a side while crossing the Corubal. The incident became known as the Cheche Disaster.

=== Treaty ===
A protocol agreement called the "Corubal River Agreement" was signed on 21 October 1978 at Conakry by the Republic of Guinea and the Republic of Guinea Bissau to develop and manage the Kaliba-Koribal River; the Corubal River is also called the Kaliba. The "Organisation pour la Mise en Valeur du Fleuve Gambie" (OMVG) also known as "The Gambia River Basin Development Organization" was also agreed to be established to study and develop management plans for projects on the Gambia River, the Geba River and the Corubal River for power generation, irrigation, flood control, navigation, water quality and infrastructure. The agreement has also recognized the total basin area of the Corubal River of 24000 km^{2} with 17500 km^{2} (72.71%) in Guinea and the balance 27.02% in Guinea Bissau. OMVG have studied four sites for development as hydro-electric power projects. The projects are, the Sambangalou on the River Gambia, the Fello Sounga and Saltinho Projects on the River Koliba/Corubal, and the Gaoual Project on the River Géba. However, the general agreement does not have any relevant substantive and procedural rules governing cooperation between Guinea and Guinea-Bissau. Hence it has been suggested that recourse should be taken to "The United Nations Convention on the Law of the Non-Navigational Uses of International Watercourses“ which is a global instrument, adopted in 1997, to promote the equitable and sustainable development and management of river basins shared by two or more states. Using the provisions of this convention the existing agreement between the two basin states on development of Corubal River would need to be enlarged making specific provisions for "informing and guiding cooperation, as well as by providing the technical committee with legal guidance for better implementing its activities."

== Geography ==
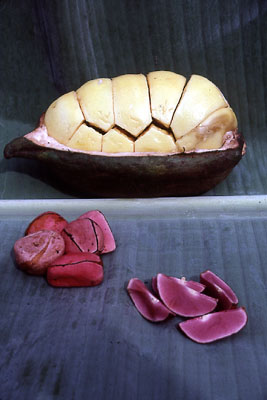
Kola nut extracted for barter for gold

It rises near Labe in the Fouta Djallon highlands of Guinea and flows generally in an east–west direction. The Bentala River is an upper tributary. It enters Guinea-Bissau on its eastern border, then meanders generally southwest, nearing the Guinea-Bissauan border, then turns northwest, passes by Xitole, then empties into the upper end of the Geba estuary, about 50 kilometres (31 mi) upstream from the city of Bissau. For a short distance, it forms the international border between Guinea and Guinea-Bissau. It flows between the southern border of Bafatá and the regions of Quinará and Tombali. It is navigable in its reach right up to Bafatá town. Navigation of the Corubal and Geba Rivers also acted as Biofada’s Mandavan caravan routes to carry salt and kola harvest for barter trading for gold, right up to the south of Koya in Cape Mount Area. The Biafada is the land above the confluence on the north bank of the Corubal River and the estuary is about 10 km wide at the confluence of the two rivers.

== Hydrometry ==
The river's discharge has been observed for 18 years (1977-1994) at Saltinho, located some 200 kilometers from the sea. At the Saltinho amont station, the mean annual discharge observed during the period was 304 m3/s for a catchment area covering 23,840 km2, over 90% of the entire watershed of the river. The depth of runoff reached 404 mm/yr, which can be considered high.

The Rio Corubal has a high but very irregular discharge. The mean monthly discharge observed in May (minimum) is only 8 m3/s, more than 140 times less than the mean for September, when discharge is at its highest. Seasonal variation is thus very high, indicating significant irregularity. Over an observation period of 18 years, the minimum monthly discharge was 5.4 m3/ s, while the maximum was 1,600 m3/s.

== Vegetation ==
In the lower stretches of the two rivers, the banks have Mangrove forests and marshy lands, which are also infested with anopheles mosquitoes. In the upper reaches of the river the basin has savanna woodland.

== Fauna ==
Most of Guinea-Bissau's populations of antelope species are situated in the Corubal River-Dulombi area. Hippopotamus make up an isolated population.
