= Sonaco =

Town and sector in the Gabu Region, Guinea-Bissau

Coordinates: 12°24′N 14°29′W

Sonaco is a town and sector in the Gabú Region of Guinea-Bissau.
