= Gabú (town) =

Gabú Nova Lamego
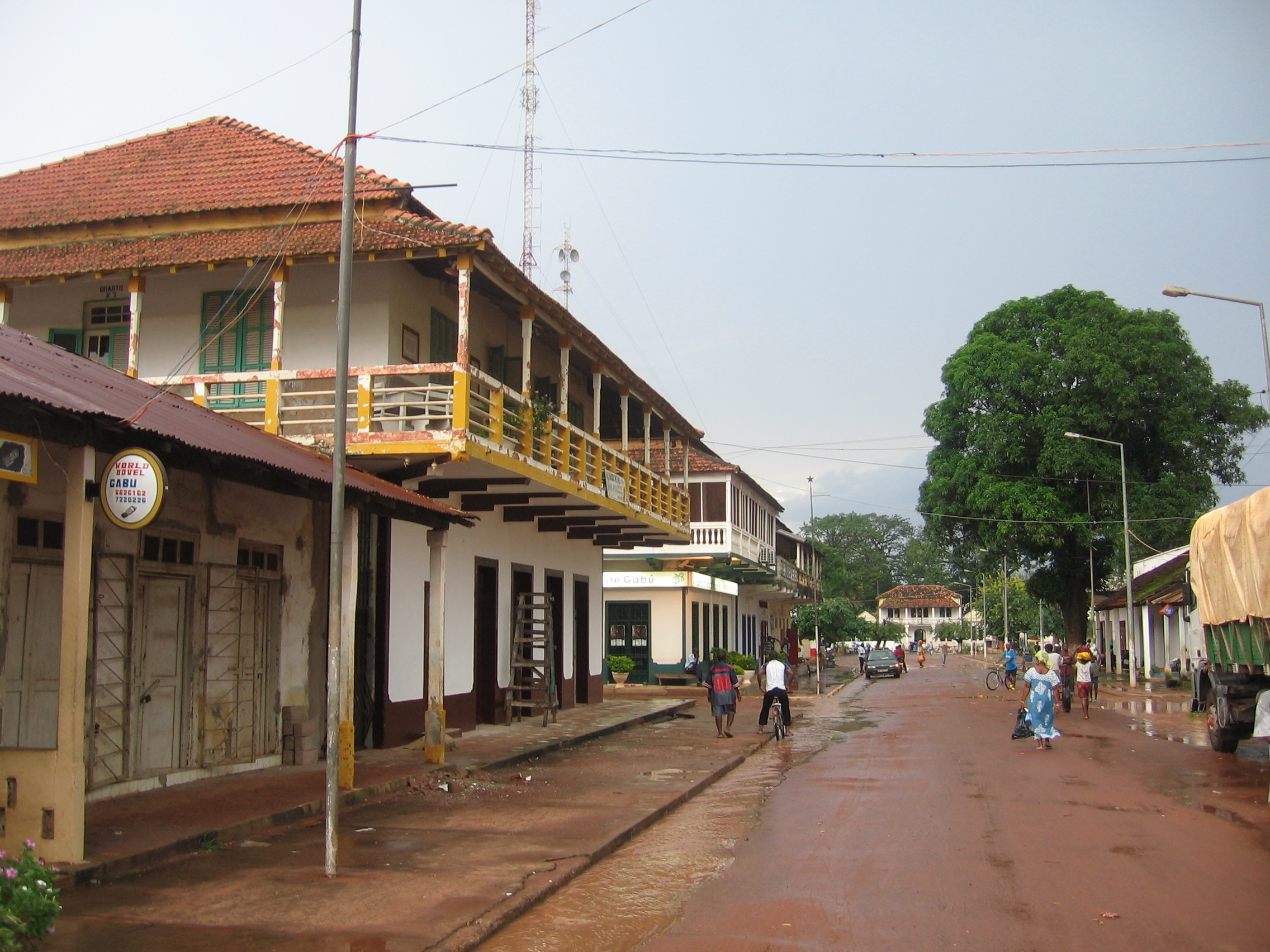
- Gabú, Guinea-Bissau

- Location in Guinea-Bissau Gabú (Africa)
- Coordinates: 12°17′0″N 14°13′0″W
- Country: Guinea-Bissau
- Region: Gabú region
- Elevation: 39 m (128 ft)

Population (2010)
  - Total: 37,525
  - Ethnicities: Fula people
  - Religions: Islam

Gabú is the largest city in eastern Guinea-Bissau, the second most populated city in the country and capital of the Gabú region.

== Name ==
The Portuguese named the town Nova Lamego ie "New Lamego", after the Douro town of Lamego. After Guinea Bissau's independence, it was renamed Gabú (sometimes spelled Cabu) in honor of the pre-colonial empire.

== Trade ==
Gabú is now mostly known as a market town with the second largest market of Guinea-Bissau, notably trading coal and ceramics as well as agricultural products. Traders come from as far afield as Guinea, Senegal, Mali and Sierra Leone.

== Climate ==
Gabú has a tropical savanna climate (Köppen Aw), similar to that of the capital Bissau but with – due to its inland location – about a quarter less rainfall and larger diurnal temperature variations. As with all of Guinea-Bissau, there are two extremely contrasting seasons: a dry season from November to May with dusty harmattan winds and hot to sweltering, rainless weather, and a monsoonal wet season from June to October featuring heavy thunderstorm rains almost every day and hot, uncomfortably humid conditions.

Climate data for Gabú
Month	Jan	Feb	Mar	Apr	May	Jun	Jul	Aug	Sep	Oct	Nov	Dec	Year
Mean daily maximum °C (°F)	31.7 (89.1)	34.4 (93.9)	37.1 (98.8)	38.0 (100.4)	36.4 (97.5)	33.1 (91.6)	30.2 (86.4)	29.2 (84.6)	30.2 (86.4)	31.2 (88.2)	31.9 (89.4)	30.5 (86.9)	32.8 (91.1)
Daily mean °C (°F)	22.8 (73.0)	25.4 (77.7)	28.4 (83.1)	30.0 (86.0)	29.6 (85.3)	27.6 (81.7)	26.1 (79.0)	25.4 (77.7)	25.9 (78.6)	26.3 (79.3)	25.7 (78.3)	22.7 (72.9)	26.3 (79.4)
Mean daily minimum °C (°F)	13.9 (57.0)	16.5 (61.7)	19.8 (67.6)	22.0 (71.6)	22.9 (73.2)	22.1 (71.8)	22.0 (71.6)	21.7 (71.1)	21.7 (71.1)	21.4 (70.5)	19.6 (67.3)	15.0 (59.0)	19.9 (67.8)
Average rainfall mm (inches)	0 (0)	0 (0)	0 (0)	3 (0.1)	37 (1.5)	159 (6.3)	273 (10.7)	420 (16.5)	350 (13.8)	180 (7.1)	20 (0.8)	2 (0.1)	1,444 (56.9)
Source: Climate-Data.org
