= Piche, Guinea-Bissau =

Coordinates: 12°20′N 13°57′W

Piche is a Sector in the Gabú Region of Guinea-Bissau. Piché is also a common last name.
