= List of political and geographic subdivisions by total area (all) =

Overview of political and geographical subdivisions by area

This is one of a series of comprehensive lists of continents, countries, and first level administrative country subdivisions such as states, provinces, and territories, as well as certain political and geographic features of substantial area. References for the information provided in this table may be found in the individual articles on each body listed herein. Some divisions are listed twice, with one listing including territory that is excluded in the other for various reasons, including territorial disputes. There is intentional overlap among the lists in order to maximize ease of use.

Geographic entity	Area (km^{2})	Notes
Earth	510,065,284	Total surface area (70.8% water coverage and 29.2% land coverage).
Water	361,126,221	Total water coverage (70.8% of Earth's surface).
Pacific Ocean and adjacent seas	165,500,000	Largest ocean, including adjacent Celebes Sea, Coral Sea, East China Sea, Philippine Sea, Sea of Japan, South China Sea, Sulu Sea, Tasman Sea, and Yellow Sea.
Pacific Ocean excluding adjacent seas	155,557,000	Largest ocean.
Land	148,939,063	Total land coverage (29.2% of Earth's surface).
United Nations countries	147,000,000	All countries in the UN.
World Health Organization countries	134,697,385	All countries in the WHO.
World Trade Organization countries	117,870,000	All countries in the WTO.
Atlantic Ocean and adjacent seas	106,400,000	Second largest ocean, including adjacent Denmark Strait, Greenland Sea, Norwegian Sea, Barents Sea, Strait of Gibraltar and Mediterranean Sea, Black Sea, Caribbean Sea, Gulf of Mexico, Hudson Bay, Arctic Ocean, North Sea, Baltic Sea, and Celtic Sea.
Old World	84,980,532	The world known to its population before contact with the "New World" (the Americas).
Afro-Eurasia	84,211,532	Largest contiguous landmass.
Holarctic	77,000,000	Biogeographic realm that encompasses the majority of habitats found throughout the northern continents of the world.
Atlantic Ocean excluding adjacent seas	76,762,000	Second largest ocean.
Indian Ocean and adjacent seas	73,556,000	Third largest ocean, including Andaman Sea, Arabian Sea, Bay of Bengal, Great Australian Bight, Gulf of Aden, Gulf of Oman, Laccadive Sea, Mozambique Channel, Persian Gulf, Red Sea, and Strait of Malacca.
Indian Ocean excluding adjacent seas	68,556,000	Third largest ocean.
Palearctic	54,100,000	Largest of the eight biogeographic realms of the Earth.
Eurasia	53,990,000	Largest broadly connected contiguous landmass, comprising the traditional continents of Europe and Asia; sometimes considered a single continent, it covers 10.6% of Earth's surface (36.2% of the land area).
Asia Cooperation Dialogue	46,872,864	Supranational political entity.
Asia	44,579,000	Largest continent.
Americas	42,549,000	Large contiguous landmass viewed in some parts of the world as single continent.
Organization of American States	40,275,678	International organization contains most countries in the Americas.
Moon	37,930,000	Satellite in orbit around the Earth, excluded by treaty from national claims of ownership.
(China) (France) (Russia) (United Kingdom) (United States) Permanent members of the United Nations Security Council	37,411,898	The sovereign states to whom the UN Charter of 1945 grants permanent seats on the UN Security Council.
British Empire	35,500,000	Largest ever multi-country empire, as of its greatest extent in 1920.
Commonwealth of Nations	31,462,574	Supranational political entity.
Africa	30,221,532	Second largest continent.
African Union	29,797,500	Supranational political entity.
North Atlantic Treaty Organization (NATO)	26,552,127	Intergovernmental military alliance.
North America	24,490,000	Continent.
Mongol Empire	24,000,000	Multi-country empire, in 1309.
Far East	23,250,309	Geographic concept to call East Asia, Southeast Asia, and Russian Far East by European historically.
Warsaw Pact	23,140,845	Collective defense treaty led by Soviet Union.
Nearctic	22,900,000	One of the eight biogeographic realms of Earth.
Russian Empire	22,800,000	Multi-country empire, in 1895.
Sub-Saharan Africa	22,341,158	Region of Africa south of the Sahara Desert.
Soviet Union	22,402,200	Largest country in the world from 1922 until its dissolution in 1991.
Afrotropic	22,100,000	One of the eight biogeographic realms of the Earth.
Northern America	21,780,142	United Nations geoscheme region. Contains Canada, United States, Greenland, St. Pierre and Miquelon and Bermuda.
USMCA	21,578,137	Free trade agreement concluded between Canada, Mexico, and the United States.
South Atlantic Peace and Cooperation Zone	20,552,728	An organization between many South Atlantic nations.
Collective Security Treaty Organization (CSTO)	20,403,694	Intergovernmental military alliance in Eurasia.
Commonwealth of Independent States	20,368,759	A regional intergovernmental organization of nine members, plus two founding non-member, post-Soviet republics in Eurasia.
Southern Ocean	20,327,000	Ocean.
Eurasian Economic Union	20,229,248	Economic union of states located in Eastern Europe, Western Asia, and Central Asia.
Latin America	20,111,457	Region in the Americas where Romance languages are predominantly spoken.
Neotropic	19,000,000	One of the eight biogeographic realms of the Earth.
South America	17,840,000	Continent.
UNASUR/UNASUL	17,715,335	Supranational political entity including most nations of South America.
Russia	17,125,200	Largest country in the world; crosses Europe and Asia.
Mercosur	14,869,775	Officially called Southern Common Market.
Qing Empire, China	14,700,000	Multi-country empire in Asia under the Yongzheng Emperor (r. 1723–1735) and his son the Qianlong Emperor (r. 1735–1796).
Arctic sea ice (maximum extent, February 2015)	14,540,000	Oceanic feature.
Antarctica	14,200,000	Continent.
Arctic Ocean	14,056,000	Ocean.
Arable land (2012)	13,958,000	Land capable of being ploughed and used to grow crops.
Arab League	13,953,041	Supranational political entity.
(Spain) Spanish Empire	13,700,000	Multi-country empire, in 1810; size is approximate.
(Russia) Siberia	13,138,242	Traditional historic and geographic region of Russia.
East Asia	11,796,365	United Nations geoscheme region. Contains China, Mongolia, North Korea, South Korea and Japan.
(France) Second French colonial empire	11,500,000	Multi-country empire, in 1920.
Taiwan (ROC, including disputed areas)	11,420,000	Including disputed territories administered by Bhutan, Myanmar, Russia, Tajikistan, Afghanistan, Pakistan, Nepal, North Korea, the People's Republic of China, Mongolia, and India.
Umayyad (Arab Caliphate).	11,100,000	A caliphate, at its greatest territorial extent in 720.
Abbasid (Arab Caliphate).	11,100,000	A caliphate lasting from 750–1258, with its size in 750 shown.
Yuan Khanate, China	11,000,000	Multi-country empire in Asia under the Yuan Khanate 1279–1368. Measured at its maximum extent in 1310.
Tang Empire, China	10,760,000	Chinese Empire from 618–907. Size at greatest extent in 669.
Europe	10,180,000	Continent in classical antiquity.
Canada	9,984,670	Second largest country in the world; largest country in North America, and in the Western Hemisphere.
China (PRC, including disputed areas)	9,742,010	Largest country located entirely in Asia. Including PRC-administered area (Aksai Chin and Trans-Karakoram Tract, both territories claimed by India), South Tibet (controlled by India as the state of Arunachal Pradesh but claimed by China), and the disputed territories of Taiwan, Penghu, Kinmen, and the Matsu Islands which the Republic of China (Taiwan) has continued to govern after the PRC replaced it on the mainland; total of separate UN figures for Mainland China and the Special Administrative Regions of Hong Kong (1,099 km^{2}) and Macau (26 km^{2}).
China (PRC, non-disputed areas)	9,706,961	Largest country located entirely in Asia. Excluding disputed territories not under PRC administration, i.e. excluding South Tibet (Indian state of Arunachal Pradesh) and Republic of China (Taiwan); total of separate UN figures for Mainland China and the Special Administrative Regions of Hong Kong (1,099 km^{2}) and Macau (26 km^{2}).
United States	9,522,055	Country in North America. Includes the 50 states and District of Columbia with Indian Reservations. Includes inland water area of 78,797 mi^{2} (204,083 km^{2}) and Great Lakes water of 60,251 mi^{2} (156,049 km^{2}); excludes coastal water area of 42,225 mi^{2} (109,362 km^{2}) and territorial water area of 75,372 mi^{2} (195,213 km^{2})
Sahara	9,200,000	Largest hot desert in the world.
Australasian Mediterranean Sea	9,080,000	Mediterranean sea located in the area between Southeast Asia and Australasia.
Oceania	9,008,458	Geopolitical area including Australia and other islands and territories in the Pacific Ocean.
Xiongnu Empire	9,000,000	Size at greatest extent in 176 BC.
Brazil	8,514,877	Largest country in South America.
Empire of Brazil	8,337,218	19th-century state in South America.
The Indies	8,063,879	A European Colonial term for South and Southeast Asia.
Australia and New Zealand	8,010,655	United Nations geoscheme region. Contains Australia, New Zealand, Norfolk Island, Christmas Island, Cocos (Keeling) Island and Heard and McDonald Islands.
Australasia	7,955,717	A subdivision of Oceania.
Economic Cooperation Organization	7,937,197	Asian political and economic intergovernmental organization.
Contiguous United States	7,902,634	Includes the 48 contiguous states and District of Columbia, but excludes Alaska and Hawaii.
Northern Africa	7,880,374	United Nations geoscheme region. Contains Egypt, Sudan, Libya, Tunisia, Algeria, Morocco and Western Sahara.
Australia	7,686,848	Continent and country in Oceania. Includes Jervis Bay Territory (73 km^{2}), Cocos (Keeling) Islands (14 km^{2}), Christmas Island (135 km^{2}) and Lord Howe Island (56 km^{2}). Also includes the uninhabited Ashmore and Cartier Islands (5 km^{2}), Coral Sea Islands Territory (0,9 km^{2}), Heard and McDonald Islands (372 km^{2}) and Macquarie Island (231 km^{2}). Excludes claims on Antarctica (Australian Antarctic Territory, 6,119,818 km^{2}).
Australasian realm	7,600,000	One of the eight biogeographic realms of the Earth.
Mainland Australia	7,595,342	The biggest landmass of Australia, does not include Tasmania, any other islands part of the country, or territories.
Indomalaya	7,500,000	One of the eight biogeographic realms of the Earth.
Middle East	7,207,575	Transcontinental region in Afro-Eurasia.
Akhand Bharat	7,015,501	concept of a greater unified india
Eastern Africa	7,002,969	United Nations geoscheme region. Contains Ethiopia, Eritrea, Djibouti, Somalia, Uganda, Kenya, Tanzania, Rwanda, Burundi, Zambia, Zimbabwe, Mozambique, Malawi, Seychelles, Madagascar, Comoros and Mauritius.
Southern Asia	6,783,786	United Nations geoscheme region. Contains Iran, Afghanistan, Pakistan, India, Sri Lanka, Maldives, British Indian Ocean Territory, Nepal, Bhutan and Bangladesh.
Middle Africa	6,613,058	United Nations geoscheme region. Contains Chad, Cameroon, Central African Republic, Democratic Republic of Congo, Republic of Congo, Gabon, Equatorial Guinea, Sao Tome & Principe and Angola.
Ming China	6,500,000	Chinese Empire after the overthrow of the Yuan Mongol dynasty 1368–1644. Measured at its maximum extent in 1450.
Eastern Han Dynasty	6,500,000	The Chinese Empire lasting from 25 – 220 AD. Size at greatest extent in 100 AD.
Rashidun Caliphate	6,400,000	In 655.
Amazon basin	6,300,000	Drainage basin of Amazon River.
Europe (excluding European Russia)	6,220,000	Traditional region.
(Russia) Far Eastern Federal District	6,215,900	Federal district of Russia created May 2000.
Nordic Council	6,187,000	An official body for former inter-parliamentary between the Nordic countries.
West Africa	6,143,409	United Nations geoscheme region. Contains Mauritania, Mali, Niger, Cabo Verde, Guinea-Bissau, Guinea, Sierra Leone, Liberia, Cote d'Ivoire, Burkina Faso, Ghana, Togo, Benin and Nigeria.
Khanate of the Golden Horde	6,000,000	Multi-country empire in Europe and Asia; a Khanate remnant of the Mongol Empire, lasting from 1240–1502. Size is approximate at its apex in 1310.
Western Han Dynasty	6,000,000	The Chinese Empire lasting from 206 BC – 9 AD. Size at greatest extent in 50 BC.
First Turkic Khaganate	6,000,000	Size at greatest extent in 557.
Australian Antarctic Territory	5,896,500	Australian claim to Antarctica.
Eastern Europe	5,726,128	United Nations geoscheme region. Contains European Russia, Ukraine, Moldova, Romania, Bulgaria, Poland, Czechia, Slovakia and Hungary.
Philippine Sea	5,695,000	Marginal sea of the Western Pacific Ocean east of the Philippine archipelago.
Amazon rainforest	5,500,000	The largest rainforest in the world.
Achaemenid Empire	5,500,000	An empire in Iran and other countries from Greece and Egypt to Uzbekistan from 550–330 BC. Size at greatest extent in 500 BC.
(Portugal) Portuguese Empire	5,500,000	The Portuguese overseas empire at its greatest extent in 1820.
Western China	5,478,097	A geographic concept of the region of western inland China.
Ottoman Empire	5,200,000	Early modern empire centered in Turkey at its greatest extent in 1683.
Macedonia (ancient kingdom)	5,200,000	Ancient empire centered in Macedonia at its greatest extent in 323 BC under Alexander the Great.
South Asian Association for Regional Cooperation (SAARC)	5,130,746	Supranational political entity.
(Russia) Siberian Federal District	5,114,800	Federal district of Russia created May 2000, distinct from but also included in the historical region of the same name.
Arctic sea ice minimum extent (September 2014)	5,020,000	
Brazilian Highlands	5,000,000	Largest plateau in the world by area.
Roman Empire	5,000,000	Multi-country empire in antiquity, under Trajan in AD 117.
Maurya Empire	5,000,000	Indian empire lasted from 321–185 BC, size is calculated to be the greatest extent reached in 250 BC.
British Raj	4,903,312	Unofficially called Indian Empire.
First Mexican Empire	4,874,683	First independent government of Mexico.
Western United States	4,851,700	Region of the United States. Contains the states of California, Oregon, Washington, Idaho, Wyoming, Montana, Colorado, Nevada, Utah, Arizona, New Mexico, Alaska and Hawaii.
Coral Sea	4,791,000	Marginal sea of the South Pacific off the northeast coast of Australia.
Tibetan Empire	4,600,000	The Tibetan state lasting from 650–842, measured at its apex in 800.
First Mexican Republic	4,536,710	North American country existed from 1824 to 1835.
Association of Southeast Asian Nations (ASEAN)	4,465,501	Supranational political entity containing Myanmar, Thailand, Cambodia, Laos, Vietnam, Malaysia, Singapore, Brunei, Philippines, Indonesia and East Timor.
Southeast Asia	4,465,501	United Nations geoscheme region, containing all ASEAN members referenced elsewhere on this list.
Timurid Empire	4,400,000	A Persian Middle Eastern empire, rising after the Mongol Empire lasting from 1355–1740, measured at its apex in 1405.
Indian subcontinent	4,400,000	A peninsular region in south-central Asia, delineated by the Himalayas in the north.
European Union	4,325,675	Supranational political entity.
Organization of Turkic States	4,242,362	Intergovernmental organization compromising Hungary and all internationally recognized Turkic states but Turkmenistan.
Fatimid Caliphate	4,100,000	Western remnant of the Umayyad Caliphate lasting from 909–1171, estimated at its greatest extent in 969.
Central Asia	4,004,451	United Nations geoscheme region. Contains Kazakhstan, Uzbekistan, Turkmenistan, Kyrgyzstan and Tajikistan.
Mughal Empire	4,000,000	An Islamic Empire in India in the early modern period. Size at greatest extent in 1690.
Eastern Turkic Khaganate	4,000,000	Eastern remnant of the Göktürk Khaganate. Size at greatest extent in 624.
Hephthalite Empire	4,000,000	Size at greatest extent in 470.
Hunnic Empire	4,000,000	Size at greatest extent in 441.
European Russia	3,960,000	Traditional historic and geographic region of Russia.
Seleucid Empire	3,900,000	A Greek/Persian Middle Eastern empire lasting from 312–63 BC, was the successor state to the Achaemenid Empire. Measured at its apex in 301 BC.
Rupert's Land	3,900,000	An area of British North America, under the jurisdiction of the Hudson's Bay Company.
Great Seljuq Empire	3,900,000	Turkish empire in the Middle East, was the European antagonist during the Crusades. Lasted from 1037–1194, size is calculated to be the greatest extent reached in 1080.
Arabian Sea	3,862,000	Northern Indian Ocean.
Andean Community	3,809,100	A free trade area with the objective of creating a customs union comprising the South American countries.
(Kingdom of Italy) Italian Empire	3,798,000	Includes Italian colonies. Size in 1938.
Ilkhanate	3,750,000	A Khanate remnant of the Mongol Empire, lasting from 1256–1355, measured at its apex in 1310.
Argentina (including claims)	3,748,072	Second largest country in South America. Includes claims over the Falkland Islands, South Georgia and South Sandwich Islands, and Argentine Antarctica, which are not under Argentine de facto control.
Dzungar Khanate	3,600,000	Size in 1650.
Khwarazmian dynasty	3,600,000	Size at greatest extent in 1218.
Northern Canada	3,535,263	Vast northernmost region of Canada.
Sassanid Empire	3,500,000	Successor state to the Parthian Empire in the Middle East and Iran, the last Iranian empire before the rise of Islam, lasting from 224–651, size estimated at its apex in 550.
Zealandia	3,500,000	Largest microcontinent (size is approximate).
Sargasso Sea	3,500,000	Region of the Atlantic Ocean bounded by four currents forming an ocean gyre.
South China Sea	3,500,000	Marginal sea occurring in part of the Pacific Ocean south of China, and bordered predominately by Vietnam, Malaysia, Indonesia, Brunei, and the Philippines.
Gupta Empire	3,500,000	One of the Indian Middle Kingdoms lasting from 320–560, size is estimated at the apex in 400.
Chagatai Khanate	3,500,000	A Khanate remnant of the Mongol Empire, measured at its apex in 1310 and 1350.
Western Turkic Khaganate	3,500,000	Western remnant of the Göktürk Khaganate. Size at greatest extent in 630.
(France) First French colonial empire	3,400,000	Size at greatest extent in 1670.
Ghaznavid Empire	3,400,000	Size at greatest extent in 1029.
India (including disputed areas)	3,287,263	Third largest country in Asia (after Russia and China). Includes all disputed territories.
Delhi Sultanate	3,200,000	Size at greatest extent in 1312.
(German Empire) German Colonial Empire	3,199,015	Size at greatest extent in 1912.
Arabian Peninsula	3,189,612	A geographic region of the Middle East.
India (non-disputed areas)	3,166,414	Third largest country in Asia (after Russia and China). Excludes non-Indian-administered disputed territories (Aksai Chin and Trans-Karakoram Tract in China; Azad Kashmir and Gilgit–Baltistan in Pakistan). Includes all Indian-administered territories, which contains the China-claimed South Tibet, administered by India as part of Arunachal Pradesh.
Northwest China	3,107,701	A statistical region of China.
Sakha Republic	3,103,200	Largest federal subject of Russia.
Song dynasty	3,100,000	The Chinese Empire lasting from 960–1279. Size at greatest extent in 980.
Uyghur Khaganate	3,100,000	Size at greatest extent in 800.
Western Jin Dynasty	3,100,000	Size at greatest extent in 280.
Peru-Bolivian Confederation	3,054,612	A loose confederation existing between 1836 and 1839 in South America.
Khazar Khanate	3,000,000	Size at greatest extent in 850.
Sui dynasty	3,000,000	Size at greatest extent in 589.
Malay Archipelago	2,870,000	Archipelago between mainland Indochina and Australia.
Paratethys sea	2,800,000	largest inland sea/Lake
Byzantine Empire	2,800,000	Remnant of the Roman Empire at its greatest extent in 450.
Parthian Empire	2,800,000	A Persian Middle Eastern empire lasting from 248 BC – 226 AD, was the successor state to the Greek Seleucid Empire and a major antagonist to the Roman Empire. Measured at its apex circa 0 AD.
Medes (Median Empire)	2,800,000	An early Persian Middle Eastern empire lasting from 625–549 BC. Size at greatest extent in 585 BC.
Eastern Jin Dynasty	2,800,000	Size at greatest extent in 347.
Rouran Khaganate	2,800,000	Size in 405.
Weddell Sea	2,800,000	Part of the Southern Ocean.
Eastern Canada	2,783,400	East part of Canada contains six provinces.
Argentina (excluding disputed claims)	2,780,400	Second largest country in South America. Does not include claims over Falkland Islands, South Georgia and the South Sandwich Islands, nor Argentine Antarctica (969,000 km^{2}).
Caribbean Sea	2,754,000	Body of water between North and South America.
Kazakhstan	2,724,900	In Asia; largest landlocked country in the world.
Western Canada	2,703,159	West part of Canada contains four provinces.
Australian Desert	2,700,000	Deserts in Australian mainland.
(Norway) Queen Maud Land	2,700,000	Norwegian Antarctic claim.
Western Asia	2,680,579	United Nations geoscheme region. Contains Turkey, Cyprus, Syria, Lebanon, Israel, Palestine, Jordan, Saudi Arabia, Yemen, Oman, United Arab Emirates, Qatar, Bahrain, Kuwait, Iraq, Georgia, Armenia and Azerbaijan.
Gulf Cooperation Council	2,673,108	Regional intergovernmental political and economic union.
Southern Africa	2,672,831	United Nations geoscheme region. Contains South Africa, Lesotho, Swaziland, Namibia and Botswana.
(United States) Pacific states	2,615,077	Division of the United States. Contains the states of California, Oregon, Washington, Alaska and Hawaii.
Bay of Bengal	2,600,000	Northeastern part of the Indian Ocean.
Western Australia	2,525,500	Largest state of Australia.
Gran Colombia	2,519,954	Republic of Colombia from 1819 to 1831
Former Sudan	2,505,813	Sudan before South Sudan split out of it. Formerly the largest country in Africa.
Mediterranean Sea	2,500,000	Body of water separating Europe and Africa.
Tibetan Plateau	2,500,000	Vast elevated plateau in South Asia, Central Asia and East Asia, the Roof of the World.
Greco-Bactrian Kingdom	2,500,000	A successor state to the Seleucid Empire in what is now Afghanistan and Uzbekistan lasting from 256–125 BC. Size at greatest extent in 184 BC.
Grand Duchy of Moscow	2,500,000	A precursor to the Russian Empire, lasting from 1263–1547. Size in 1505.
Central America	2,486,445	United Nations geoscheme region. Contains Mexico, Belize, Guatemala, El Salvador, Honduras, Nicaragua, Costa Rica and Panama.
East African Community	2,467,202	Intergovernmental organisation composed of six countries in the African Great Lakes region.
Southern United States	2,383,946	Region of the United States. Contains the states of Texas, Louisiana, Arkansas, Oklahoma, Mississippi, Florida, Alabama, Georgia, Tennessee, South Carolina, North Carolina, Kentucky, Virginia, West Virginia, Maryland and Delaware.
Algeria	2,381,741	Largest country in Africa.
Southwest China	2,365,900	A statistical region of China.
Gulf of Guinea	2,350,000	Northeasternmost part of the tropical Atlantic Ocean.
Democratic Republic of the Congo	2,344,858	Second largest country in Africa.
Krasnoyarsk Krai	2,339,700	Federal subject of Russia.
Arabian Desert	2,330,000	Vast desert wilderness in Western Asia.
Qin dynasty	2,300,000	First dynasty of Imperial China.
Central Canada	2,265,154	Sub-region of Eastern Canada.
(United States) Mountain states	2,236,623	Division of the United States. Contains the states of Idaho, Wyoming, Montana, Colorado, Nevada, Utah, Arizona and New Mexico.
Kingdom of Denmark	2,220,093	Including Denmark, Greenland and Faroe Islands.
Greenland	2,175,600	An autonomous country, part of the Kingdom of Denmark.
Saudi Arabia	2,149,690	Largest country in Middle East.
(United States) Louisiana Purchase	2,147,000	Area of the United States purchased from France in 1803, which now comprises all or part of fifteen U.S. states.
Midwestern United States	2,128,257	Region of the United States. Contains the states of Michigan, Wisconsin, Minnesota, Iowa, Missouri, Illinois, Indiana, Ohio, North Dakota, South Dakota, Nebraska and Kansas.
(France) First French Empire	2,100,000	Multi-country empire under Emperor Napoleon I of France, from 1804–1814; size at greatest extent in 1813.
Mainland Southeast Asia (Indochina)	2,071,552	Continental portion of Southeast Asia, compromising Cambodia, Laos, peninsular portion of Malaysia, Myanmar, Singapore, Thailand and Vietnam.
Chile (Including Territorial Claims)	2,007,208	Includes Easter Island (Isla de Pascua; Rapa Nui), Isla Sala y Gómez and Antarctica (1,250,000 km^{2}).
Western Roman Empire	2,000,000	Comprises the western provinces of the Roman Empire.
Inca Empire	2,000,000	Incan Empire along Andean coast in South America lasting from 1438–1533.
Confederate States of America	1,995,392	Unrecognized country in North America, 1861–1865.
Empire of Japan	1,984,000	Size in 1938.
Mexico	1,958,201	Third largest country in North America; also third largest country in Latin America.
Nunavut	1,936,113	Largest sub-federal jurisdiction of Canada, largest territory of Canada.
Indonesia	1,904,569	In Southeast Asia; largest and most populous country situated only on islands.
Sudan	1,886,068	Third largest country in Africa.
Horn of Africa	1,882,757	Peninsula in Eastern Africa.
Northern Europe	1,811,151	United Nations geoscheme region. Contains Norway (including Jan Mayen and Svalbard), Sweden, Finland, Denmark (including Faroe Islands), Iceland, Estonia, Latvia, Lithuania, United Kingdom and Ireland.
(British Empire) Thirteen Colonies	1,876,972	Found by taking the size of the United States less the size of its acquired territories.
(Russia) Urals Federal District	1,788,900	Federal district of Russia created May 2000.
East Indies	1,784,398	A European Colonial term for Maritime Southeast Asia, including Malaysia, East Timor, the Philippines, Brunei, Singapore and Indonesia (less its territory on New Guinea).
Libya	1,759,540	Country in northern Africa.
Queensland	1,727,300	State of Australia.
Alaska	1,717,856	Largest state of the United States.
Sinkiang	1,711,931	Former province of Xinjiang, a province of the Republic of China, also spelled Sinkiang Province.
British Antarctic Territory	1,709,400	British claim to Antarctica
(Russia) Northwestern Federal District	1,677,900	Federal district of Russia created May 2000.
(China) Xinjiang	1,660,000	Largest autonomous region of China.
Iran	1,648,195	Second largest country in Middle East.
Four Oirat	1,600,000	Area in 17th century.
Amazonas	1,570,746	Largest state of Brazil.
Mongolia	1,564,116	Country located between China and Russia.
North China(with eastern Inner Mongolia)	1,556,061	A statistical region of China.
(Indonesia) Greater Sunda Islands	1,510,709	Four large islands in the Indonesian archipelago. Includes Borneo, Sumatra, Sulawesi and Java.
Qara Khitai	1,500,000	Also known as the Western Liao.
Gulf of Mexico	1,500,000	Body of water in North America.
Canadian Arctic Archipelago	1,407,770	An archipelago of over 36,000 islands in the Arctic Ocean, all part of Canada.
Khoshut Khanate	1,400,000	An Oirat khanate based in the Tibetan Plateau.
Neo-Assyrian Empire	1,400,000	An ancient Middle Eastern empire along the Fertile Crescent, lasting from 934–609 BC.
Quebec	1,365,128	Second largest sub-federal jurisdiction of Canada, largest province of Canada.
Mexican Cession	1,360,000	A large area of the First Mexican Empire, which was lost after the Mexican–American War in 1848 to the US.
(United States) West North Central states	1,347,716	Division of the United States. Contains the states of Minnesota, Iowa, Missouri, North Dakota, South Dakota, Nebraska and Kansas.
Northern Territory	1,346,200	Territory of Australia.
Kalmar Union	1,322,358	A medieval and early modern Kingdom in Scandinavia consisting of Denmark, Iceland, Norway and most of modern Sweden and Finland, lasting from 1397–1523. Size does not include the colonial territories in Greenland.
Westarctica	1,320,000	A micronation in Antarctica.
Republic of New Granada	1,331,250	Modern day Colombia from 1831 to 1858
Southern Europe	1,316,300.44	United Nations geoscheme region. Contains Spain, Portugal, Andorra, Italy, Malta, San Marino, Vatican City, Slovenia, Croatia, Bosnia and Herzegovina, Serbia, Montenegro, Kosovo, Albania, Macedonia and Greece.
Gobi Desert	1,295,000	Desert or brushland region in East Asia.
Peru	1,285,216	Country in South America.
Chad	1,284,000	Country in Africa.
Niger	1,267,000	Country in Africa.
(Magallanes y la Antártica Chilena Region) Chilean Antarctic Territory	1,250,258	Chilean claim to Antarctica
East China Sea	1,249,000	Marginal sea east of China, also bordered by South Korea and Japan.
Pará	1,247,690	Second largest state of Brazil.
Angola	1,246,700	Country in Africa.
Mali	1,240,192	Country in Africa.
Hudson Bay	1,230,000	Body of water in northeastern Canada.
(China) Tibet Autonomous Region	1,228,400	Autonomous region of China.
Ethiopian Empire (Abyssinia)	1,221,900	An African Empire lasting from 980 BC – 1974 AD.
South Africa	1,221,148	Country in Africa. Area of mainland South Africa is 1,220,813 km^{2} (471,359 sq mi), added to which are the Prince Edward Islands – Marion Island, 290 km^{2}, and Prince Edward Island, 45 km^{2}.
Central Europe	1,200,790	United Nations geoscheme region. Contains France, Monaco, Netherlands, Belgium, Luxembourg, Germany, Switzerland, Liechtenstein and Austria.
Carolingian Empire	1,200,000	The maximum extent of Frankish Kingdom under Charlemagne in 814. An immediate precursor to the Holy Roman Empire.
Srivijaya	1,200,000	Buddhist thalassocratic empire based on the island of Sumatra, Indonesia.
Northwest Territories	1,183,085	Territory of Canada.
(China) Inner Mongolia	1,183,000	Autonomous region of China.
Polish–Lithuanian Commonwealth	1,153,465	The maximum extent of bi-confederation of Poland and Lithuania, in 1650.
(United States) West South Central States	1,150,090	Division of the United States. Contains the states of Arkansas, Louisiana, Oklahoma and Texas.
Colombia	1,138,914	Country in South America. Colombian census figure is 1,141,748 which includes three special districts and San Andrés and Providencia islands (52 km^{2}).
Ethiopia	1,104,300	Country in Africa.
Bolivia	1,098,581	Country in South America.
Melanesia	1,040,672	One of the Island subdivisions of Oceania.
French East India Company	1,040,549	The maximum extent of French Colonial rule in India in 1754. Estimated by adding together the areas of the States and territories of India which correspond approximately to the French East India Company.
(Russia) Volga Federal District	1,038,000	Federal district of Russia created May 2000.
Mauritania	1,025,520	Country in Africa.
Tarim Basin	1,020,000	Endorheic basin in Northwest China.
South Central China	1,014,354	A statistical region of China.
Republic of Texas	1,007,935	Briefly independent breakaway state from the First Mexican Empire in 1835, later annexed in 1846 by the United States.
Tierra del Fuego (including claims)	1,002,445	If taken to include claims to the Falkland Islands, South Georgia and South Sandwich Islands, and Argentine Antarctica (none of which are controlled by Argentina). Argentina's largest province, if these claims are included.
New Kingdom of Egypt	1,000,000	The final imperial phase of dynastic Egypt, lasting from 1570–1070 BC.
Khmer Empire	1,000,000	Hindu/Buddhist empire in Southeast Asia.
Oceanian realm	1,000,000	One of the eight biogeographic realms of the Earth.
(Russia) West Siberian economic region	992,000	Economic Region of Russia.
(Nunavut) Qikiqtaaluk Region	989,879.35	Largest second-level administrative division in the world.
Manchukuo	984,195	A puppet state of the Empire of Japan, existed during 1932–1945.
South Australia	983,482	State of Australia.
Egypt	980,869	Country in Africa; excluding the Halaib Triangle.
Sea of Japan	978,000	Body of water between the Korean Peninsula to the west, Russia to the north, and Japan to the east.
Northeast Greenland National Park	972,000	Largest administrative division of Greenland; largest National Park in the world.
Argentine Antarctica	965,597	Argentine claim over Antarctica
Tanzania	945,087	Country in Africa. Includes the islands of Mafia, Pemba, and Zanzibar.
Argentine Sea	940,000	Body of water within the continental shelf off the Argentine mainland. It extends from Buenos Aires Province coast on the North to the Falkland Islands on the South.
British Columbia	925,186	Province of Canada. Land area only.
Nigeria	923,768	Country in Africa.
Merovengian Kingdom of Francia	918,881	The Frankish Kingdom after the conquest of Burgundy, lasting from 536-768.
Ontario	917,741	Second largest province of Canada. Land area only. With water area can excess 1,000,000
Venezuela	916,445	Country in South America; does not include claims of the Guyana–Venezuela territorial dispute. If included, the area would be 1,075,945 km^{2}.
Mato Grosso	903,358	State of Brazil.
Kalahari Desert	900,000	Semi-arid sandy savannah in Southern Africa.
Taymyrsky Dolgano-Nenetsky District	897,900	Largest second-level administrative divisions in Russia.
Pakistan (including disputed areas)	880,254	Country in South Asia. Includes Pakistani-administered disputed territories (Azad Kashmir and Northern Areas).
Grand Duchy of Lithuania	876,600	A large medieval pagan empire in Europe lasting from 1253-1569 as an independent state, prior to its union with Poland. Measured at its greatest extent in the 15th century.
(Libya) Cyrenaica	855,370	Eastern coastal region of Libya.
(Alaska) Unorganized Borough	837,700	Subdivided part of Alaska, largest "borough" of the state.
Namibia	824,292	Country in Africa.
(Russia) Ural economic region	824,000	Economic region of Russia.
Holy Roman Empire	814,415	Central European Confederacy from 962-1806. Measured at its largest extent under Ferdinand II, Holy Roman Emperor.
Mozambique	801,590	Country in Africa.
New South Wales	800,642	State of Australia.
Akkadian Empire	800,000	An ancient middle eastern empire centered on the Fertile Crescent, lasting from 2400-2200 BC.
Pakistan (non-disputed areas)	796,095	Country in South Asia. Excludes all disputed territories.
East China	795,837	A statistical region of China.
Northeast China (Without eastern Inner Mongolia)	793,300	A statistical region of China.
Khabarovsk Krai	788,600	Federal subject of Russia.
New Guinea	786,000	Island divided between Indonesia and Papua New Guinea.
Turkey	783,562	Country partly in Europe and partly in Asia.
(United States) East North Central states	780,541	Division of the United States. Contains the states of Michigan, Wisconsin, Illinois, Indiana, and Ohio.
Union between Sweden and Norway (United Kingdom of Sweden and Norway)	774,184	A Kingdom in Scandinavia between 1814-1905.
(Western Australia) Goldfields–Esperance	771,276	Largest region of Western Australia.
Irkutsk Oblast	767,900	Federal subject of Russia.
Evenkiysky District	763,200	Second largest second-level administrative divisions in Russia.
(United States) South Atlantic states	758,842	Division of the United States. Contains the states of Virginia, West Virginia, North Carolina, South Carolina, Georgia, Florida, Maryland, Delaware and District of Columbia.
Chile	756,096	Includes Easter Island (Isla de Pascua; Rapa Nui) and Isla Sala y Gómez, excludes claims on Antarctica (1,250,000 km^{2}).
Zambia	752,618	Country in Africa.
Aerican Empire	750,503	A self-proclaimed monarchist micronation in Canada.
Yamalo-Nenets Autonomous Okrug	750,300	Federal subject of Russia.
Scandinavian Peninsula	750,000	Peninsula in Europe, occupied by Norway and Sweden.
Borneo	748,168	Island divided between Brunei, Indonesia and Malaysia.
(Quebec) Nord-du-Québec	747,191.93	Largest subdivisions of Quebec.
Chukotka Autonomous Okrug	737,700	Federal subject of Russia.
(China) Qinghai	721,200	Largest province of China.
Oregon Territory	720,011	Territory acquired from Britain by the US in 1848.
Eastern Province, Saudi Arabia (Ash Sharqiyah)	710,000	Largest province of Saudi Arabia.
Texas	696,200	State of the United States.
Visigothic Kingdom	684,738	A Germanic Kingdom on the Iberian peninsula, lasting from 474-723. Measured at its apex in 500.
Austria-Hungary	676,615	Central European empire from 1867 to 1918.
Myanmar	676,578	Country in Southeast Asia.
Patagonian Desert	673,000	Largest desert in South America.
(Niger) Agadez Region	667,799	Largest region of Niger.
(Greenland) Qaasuitsup	660,000	Largest municipality of Greenland.
(Russia) Central Federal District	652,800	Federal district of Russia, created May 2000.
Afghanistan	652,090	Country in Central Asia.
(Brazil) (Argentina) (Paraguay) (Bolivia) Gran Chaco	647,000	Geographical region in South America.
France	643,801	Third largest European country (Metropolitan France only). While not fully part of France, the French Republic also includes French Overseas Collectivity and covers 674,843 km^{2}, excluding claims on Antarctica (432,000 km^{2}). With its overseas territories France precedes Ukraine as the second largest European country.
Alberta	642,317	Province of Canada. Land area only
Somalia	637,657	Country in Africa.
Nazi Germany	633,786	Nazi Germany encompasses present day Germany, and a few other territories.
Austrian Empire	625,418	A central European empire lasting from 1804-1867
(South Australia) Outback Communities Authority	624,339	Largest second level administrative division of Australia.
Central African Republic	622,984	Country in Africa.
South Sudan	619,745	Country in Africa.
Merovengian Kingdom of Francia	611,759	The Frankish Kingdom at its founding under Clovis I in 481.
Ukraine	603,700	Second largest European country.
(Chad) Borkou-Ennedi-Tibesti Region	600,350	Largest region of Chad.
Saskatchewan	591,670	Province of Canada. Land area only.
Arkhangelsk Oblast	589,200	Federal district of Russia, created May 2000.
Madagascar	587,041	Island country in Africa. Second largest country composed of a single island (after Australia).
Minas Gerais	586,528	State of Brazil.
Ostrogothic Kingdom	586,046	A Germanic Kingdom in Italy and Illyria after the fall of the Western Roman Empire, lasting from 476-553. Measurement is approximate.
Iberian Peninsula	581,471	A peninsula of Southwest Europe, occupied by Spain and Portugal.
Botswana	581,730	Country in Africa.
Kenya	580,367	Country in Africa.
Caliphate of Córdoba	570,000	A Moorish Caliphate in Iberia after the local withdrawal of the Fatimid Caliphate, lasting from 756-1031.
Bahia	564,693	State of Brazil.
(Algeria) Tamanrasset Province	557,906	Largest province of Algeria.
Manitoba	553,556	Province of Canada. Land area only.
(Libya) Fezzan	551,700	Southwestern region of modern Libya.
Metropolitan France	551,500	The parts of France which are on the European Continent.
German Empire	540,000	The unified German state from 1871-1918.
(Saudi Arabia) Al-Ahsa Governorate	534,000	Largest second level administrative division of Saudi Arabia.
(Greenland) Sermersooq	531,900	Second largest second level administrative division of Greenland.
Yemen	527,968	Country in Middle East. Includes Perim, Socotra, the former Yemen Arab Republic (YAR or North Yemen), and the former People's Democratic Republic of Yemen (PDRY or South Yemen).
Khanty–Mansi Autonomous Okrug	523,100	Federal subject of Russia.
(Greenland) Avannaata	522,700	Third largest second level administrative division of Greenland.
Central America	521,499	Region between North America and South America.
Thailand	513,115	Country in Southeast Asia.
(Western Australia) Pilbara	771,276	Second largest region of Western Australia.
(Canada) Baffin Island	507,451	Island in Canadian Arctic.
Spain	506,030	Country in Europe. Includes mainland Spain, the Balearic Islands and Canary Islands, as well as the Spanish possessions (Plazas de Soberanía) off the coast of Morocco (Ceuta, Melilla, Islas Chafarinas, Peñón de Alhucemas, and Peñón de Vélez de la Gomera), and Isla de Alborán almost midway between Morocco and Spain, all the latter being claimed by Morocco, and the small enclave of Llívia totally surrounded by France. Excluding Gibraltar Which is part of the UK
Balkan peninsula	505,000	Southeasternmost peninsula of Europe.
Atlantic Canada	500,531	Smallest main region of Canada.
Middle Kingdom of Egypt	500,000	Second Egyptian dynastic empire lasting from 2080-1640 BC.
Neo-Babylonian Empire	500,000	An ancient Middle Eastern empire centered on the Fertile Crescent, lasting from 626 to 539 BC.
Aztec Empire	500,000	A Meso-American Empire in Mexico lasting from 1325-1521.
(Mali) Tombouctou Region	496,611	Largest region of Mali
Turkmenistan	488,100	Country in Central Asia
Denmark-Norway	487,476	A Scandinavian kingdom lasting from 1536 to 1814.
(China) Sichuan	485,000	Province of China.
(Libya) Kufra District	483,510	Largest district of Libya. The 32 districts were reorganized into 22 Sha'biyah in 2007, but Kufra appears to have retained its borders.
(Western Australia) Mid West	478,000	Third largest region of Western Australia.
Cameroon	475,442	Country in Africa.
(United States) East South Central states	475,014	Division of the United States. Contains the states of Alabama, Mississippi, Tennessee and Kentucky.
Yukon	474,391	Territory of Canada.
Kamchatka Krai	472,300	Federal subject of Russia.
(China) Bayingolin Mongol Autonomous Prefecture	471,526	Largest autonomous prefecture of China.
Northeastern United States	469,615	Region of the United States. Maine, New York, New Hampshire, Vermont, Massachusetts, Connecticut, Rhode Island, Pennsylvania and New Jersey.
Weimar Republic	468,787	German state from 1918 to 1933.
Papua New Guinea	462,840	Country in Oceania.
Magadan Oblast	461,400	Federal subject of Russia.
(China) Heilongjiang	454,800	Province of China.
(China) Gansu	453,700	Province of China.
(China) Nagqu	450,537	City of China.
Ross Dependency	450,000	New Zealand claim to Antarctica.
Sweden	449,964	Country in Europe. Includes Gotland and Öland.
Uzbekistan	447,400	Country in Central Asia; largest doubly landlocked country of the world.
Morocco	446,550	Country in Africa; excluding Western Sahara.
(Indonesia) Sumatra	443,066	Island in Indonesia.
Iraq	438,317	Country in Middle East.
(Russia) North Caucasus Economic Region (including disputed areas)	433,228	Economic region of Russia, including Sevastopol and the Republic of Crimea.
(French Southern and Antarctic Lands) Adélie Land	432,000	French claim to Antarctica; largest district of the French Southern and Antarctic Lands.
Zabaykalsky Krai	431,500	Federal subject of Russia.
(Kazakhstan) Karagandy Province	428,000	Largest province of Kazakhstan.
(Algeria) Adrar Province	427,368	Second largest province of Algeria.
(Western Australia) Kimberley	424,517	Most northern region of Western Australia.
California	423,970	State of the United States.
Papua	421,981	Province of Indonesia, status uncertain following Indonesian declaration of intent to subdivide into smaller provinces.
(Canada) Queen Elizabeth Islands	419,061	Subsection of islands in the Arctic Archipelago.
Komi Republic	415,900	Federal subject of Russia.
(Saudi Arabia) Riyadh Province	412,000	Second largest province of Saudi Arabia.
Arkhangelsk Oblast	410,700	Federal subject of Russia.
Gulf of Aden	410,000	Sea in between the Horn of Africa and the Arabian Peninsula.
Paraguay	406,752	Country in South America.
(Russia) North Caucasus Economic Region (non-disputed areas)	405,400	Economic region of Russia, not including Sevastopol and the Republic of Crimea.
Old Kingdom	400,000	The first unified Egyptian empire lasting from 2686–2134 BC.
Middle Assyrian period	400,000	An ancient Middle Eastern kingdom in the Fertile Crescent, lasting from 1365–1000 BC.
(China) Yunnan	394,000	Province of China.
(China) Nagqu	391,817	Largest prefecture-level city of China.
Zimbabwe	390,757	Country in Africa.
Kurdistan	390,000(Est.)	Region in the Middle East; homeland of the Kurds
Second Polish Republic	389,720	Country in Interwar Europe. Size accounts for area peak in 1939.
Norway (total)	385,155	Country in Europe. Includes mainland Norway (324,220 km^{2}) and the integral overseas areas of Svalbard and Jan Mayen (60,980 km^{2}); excludes the dependency of Bouvet Island (49 km^{2}) and the Antarctic dependency claims of Queen Maud Land and Peter I Island (~2,500,000 km^{2}).
Yukon-Koyukuk Census Area	382,810	Census area in the U.S. State of Alaska, largest county-equivalent in the United States.
Montana	380,838	State of the United States.
Japan	377,873	Country in Asia. Includes Ryukyu Islands (including Daitō Islands), Ogasawara Islands (Bonin Islands), Minami-Torishima (Marcus Island), Okino-Torishima and Volcano Islands (Kazan Islands); excludes the southern Kuril Islands.
Baltic Sea	377,000	Sea in Europe, bordered to the north by Sweden and Finland, to the east by Finland, Russia, Estonia, Latvia, and Lithuania, on the south by Poland and Germany, and on the West by Denmark.
New Valley Governorate	376,505	Largest governorate of Egypt.
Newfoundland and Labrador	373,872	Province of Canada.
(South Africa) Northern Cape	372,889	Largest province of South Africa.
Caspian Sea	371,000	Body of water in Central Asia variously classed as the world's largest lake or a full-fledged sea. Between Russia, Kazakhstan, Azerbaijan, Turkmenistan, and Iran.
Santa Cruz Department	370,621	Largest department of Bolivia.
Loreto Region	368,852	Largest region of Peru.
Amur Oblast	363,700	Federal subject of Russia.
Mato Grosso do Sul	357,125	State of Brazil.
Germany	357,022	Country in Europe; before the German reunification took place on 3 October 1990, Germany consisted of the former Federal Republic of Germany (FRG, West Germany) with 248,689 km^{2} and the German Democratic Republic (GDR, East Germany) with 108,333 km^{2}.
(Ethiopia) Oromia Region	353,632	Largest region of Ethiopia.
(Libya) Tripolitania	353,000	Historic region and former province of Libya.
(Buryatia) Buryat Republic	351,300	Federal subject of Russia.
Adélie Land	351,000	District French southern territories.
(Libya) Murzuq District	349,790	2nd largest district of Libya. The 32 districts were reorganized into 22 Sha'biyah in 2007, but Murzuq appears to have retained its borders.
Kingdom of Prussia	348,779	Former European kingdom-state between 1701 1918. Measured area from 1871.
(Sudan) Northern	348,765	Largest state of Sudan.
(Balochistan, Pakistan) Balochistan	347,190	Largest province of Pakistan.
Rajasthan	342,236	Largest state of India.
Republic of the Congo	342,000	Country in Africa.
Goiás	340,087	State of Brazil.
Finland	338,145	Country in Europe. Includes Åland.
South Yemen	332,970	Former country in the Middle East from 1967 to 1990; now reunified into Yemen.
Maranhão	331,983	State of Brazil.
Vietnam	331,689	Country in Southeast Asia.
Malaysia	329,847	Country in Southeast Asia.
(China) Haixi Mongol and Tibetan Autonomous Prefecture	325,785	Second largest autonomous prefecture of China.
Norway (excluding self-governing territories)	323,941	Country in Europe. Includes mainland Norway; excludes the integral overseas areas of Svalbard and Jan Mayen (60,980 km^{2}), the dependency of Bouvet Island (49 km^{2}) and the Antarctic dependency claims of Queen Maud Land and Peter I Island (~2,500,000 km^{2}).
Côte d'Ivoire	322,463	Country in Africa.
Tomsk Oblast	316,900	Federal subject of Russia.
British Isles	315,134	A series of islands in northern Europe.
New Mexico	314,915	State of the United States.
Poland	312,685	Country in Central Europe.
Oman	309,500	Country in Middle East.
Madhya Pradesh	308,144	State of India.
Maharashtra	307,713	State of India
Buenos Aires Province	307,571	Largest province of Argentina
Italy	301,318	Country in Europe
(Kazakhstan) Aktobe Province	300,600	Second-largest province of Kazakhstan.
Philippines	300,000	Country in Southeast Asia.
(Sudan) North Darfur	296,420	Second largest state of Sudan.
Arizona	295,254	State of the United States
Kingdom of Romania	295,049	Kingdom of Romania (1881–1947) at its greater extent in between 1919 and 1940
(Anadyrsky District) Anadyrsky	287,900	Administrative and municipal district of Chukotka.
Nevada	286,351	State of the United States
Yugoslavia	284,710	A Balkan country lasting from 1918 to 1992.
(Algeria) Illizi Province	284,618	Province of Algeria.
Ecuador	283,561	Country in South America. Includes Galápagos Islands.
East Kazakhstan Province	283,300	Third largest province of Kazakhstan.
(United States) Mid-Atlantic states	283,168	Division of the United States. New York, Pennsylvania and New Jersey.
Rio Grande do Sul	281,749	State of Brazil.
Somali Region	279,252	Second largest region of Ethiopia.
Tocantins	277,621	State of Brazil.
Andhra Pradesh	275,068	State of India.
Burkina Faso	274,000	Country in Africa.
New Zealand	270,534	Country in Oceania. Includes Antipodes Islands, Auckland Islands, Bounty Islands, Campbell Island, Chatham Islands, and Kermadec Islands. Excludes Niue (260 km^{2}), the Cook Islands (236 km^{2}) and Tokelau (12 km^{2}), as well as the Antarctic claim of Ross Dependency (450,000 km^{2}).
Colorado	269,601	State of the United States.
Gabon	267,668	Country in Africa.
Western Sahara	266,000	Country in Africa; largely occupied by Morocco, some territory administered by the Sahrawi Arab Democratic Republic.
(Russia) Volga-Vyatka	265,400	Economic Region of Russia.
Lake Agassiz	260,000	Former Largest glacial lake
Oregon	254,805	State of the United States.
Wyoming	253,348	State of the United States.
Michigan	253,266	State of the United States.
(Mauritania) Tiris Zemmour	252,900	Largest region of Mauritania.
Piauí	251,529	State of Brazil.
Serbian Empire	250,000	Serbian medieval empire from 1346–1371.
West Germany	248,689	Former country in Europe from 1949 to 1990; now reunified into Germany.
São Paulo	248,209	State of Brazil.
Guinea	245,857	Country in Africa.
North Slope Borough, Alaska	245,436	County of Alaska; largest county in the United States, and largest organized political subdivision that is not a state.
East Kalimantan	245,238	Province of Indonesia.
Chihuahua	244,938	Largest state of Mexico.
Great Lakes	244,100	Lake system in North America, predominately between Canada and the United States.
Santa Cruz	243,943	Second largest province of Argentina.
United Kingdom	242,900	Country in Europe. Excludes the three Crown dependencies (768 km^{2}), the 13 British overseas territories (17,027 km^{2}) and the British Antarctic Territory (1,395,000 km^{2}).
(Castile (historical region)) Crown of Castile	241,782	Royal union of Kingdoms in Spain lasting from 1230–1760, also known as the Kingdom of Castile y Leon.
Uganda	241,038	Country in Africa.
Uttar Pradesh	238,566	State of India.
Ghana	238,533	Country in Africa.
Romania	238,391	Country in Central Europe.
Bolívar	238,000	Largest state of Venezuela.
(China) Guangxi	237,600	Autonomous region of China.
Rondônia	237,576	State of Brazil.
Laos	236,800	Country in Southeast Asia.
Caribbean	234,917	Also known as the West Indies, all the islands of the Caribbean Sea including the Greater Antilles, the Lesser Antilles and the Lucayan Archipelago.
Sichuan Basin	229,500	Lowland region in southwestern China.
Victoria	227,146	State of Australia.
(Kazakhstan) Kyzylorda Province	226,000	Province of Kazakhstan.
Minnesota	225,365	State of the United States.
(Japan) Honshu	225,800	The biggest of the four main islands of Japan.
Chubut	224,686	Third largest province of Argentina.
Roraima	224,299	State of Brazil.
(Kazakhstan) Almaty Province	224,000	Province of Kazakhstan.
Korea	223,915	Peninsular region in East Asia.
(Angola) Moxico Province	223,023	Largest province of Angola.
Jammu and Kashmir	222,236	State of India.
North Kurdufan	221,900	Third largest state of Sudan.
Korea	220,186	Country in Asia prior to 1948; now divided into North Korea and South Korea.
Utah	219,887	State of the United States.
Kingdom of Hungary	218,915	A European Kingdom lasting from 1000–1804. Measured at its apex in 1450.
(Sudan) Red Sea	218,887	State of Sudan.
(Canada) Victoria Island	217,291	Second-largest island in the Arctic Archipelago.
Idaho	216,446	State of the United States.
(Mauritania) Adrar	215,300	Second largest region of Mauritania.
Guyana	214,969	Country in South America.
Beni Department	213,564	Second largest department of Bolivia.
Kansas	213,096	State of the United States.
(Matrouh Governorate) Matruh Governorate	212,112	Second largest governorate of Egypt.
(Algeria) Ouargla Province	211,980	Province of Algeria.
(China) Hunan	210,000	Province of China.
Great Britain	209,331	An island of the British Isles, largest of that group.
Belarus	207,600	Largest landlocked country in Europe.
Greater Antilles	207,435	An island grouping in the Caribbean.
(China) Shaanxi	205,600	Province of China.
(Punjab, Pakistan) Punjab	205,344	Second largest province of Pakistan.
Red Sea Governorate	203,685	Third largest governorate of Egypt.
Río Negro	203,013	Province of Argentina.
Nebraska	200,345	State of the United States.
Kyrgyzstan	199,900	Country in Central Asia.
South Dakota	199,731	State of the United States.
(Democratic Republic of the Congo) Tshopo	199,567	Province of the Democratic Republic of the Congo.
Paraná	199,315	State of Brazil.
(China) Ruoqiang County	199,222	County of China. Largest third-level administrative division in the world.
(Angola) Cuando Cubango Province	199,049	Second largest province of Angola.
Senegal	196,722	Country in Africa.
(Canada) Ellesmere Island	196,236	Third-largest island in the Arctic Archipelago.
Gujarat	196,024	State of India.
(Kazakhstan) Kostanay Province	196,000	Province of Kazakhstan.
North Yemen	195,000	Former country in the Middle East from 1967 to 1990; now reunified into Yemen.
Sverdlovsk Oblast	194,800	Federal subject of Russia.
Karnataka	191,791	State of India.
Kingdom of the Lombards	189,418	A Germanic Kingdom in northern Italy, lasting from 568-774.
(China) Hebei	187,700	Province of China.
(China) Jilin	187,400	Province of China.
(United States) New England	186,447	Division of the United States. Maine, New Hampshire, Vermont, Massachusetts, Connecticut and Rhode Island.
(China) Hubei	185,900	Province of China.
Syria (including disputed areas)	185,180	Country in Middle East. Including the Golan Heights.
Washington	184,665	State of the United States.
Syria (non-disputed areas)	183,885	Country in Middle East. Excluding the Golan Heights.
North Dakota	183,112	State of the United States.
(Mauritania) Hodh Ech Chargui	182,700	Third largest region of Mauritania.
Sonora	182,052	State of Mexico.
(Iran) Sistan and Baluchestan province	181,785	Largest province of Iran.
Yorubaland	181,300	Homeland and the cultural region of the Yoruba people.
Oklahoma	181,035	State of the United States.
Cambodia	181,035	Country in Southeast Asia.
(Iran) Kerman province	180,836	Second largest province of Iran.
(Indonesia) Sulawesi	180,681	Island of Indonesia.
Missouri	180,533	State of the United States.
Amazonas (Venezuelan state)	180,145	Second largest state of Venezuela.
(China) Guangdong	180,000	Province of China.
Novosibirsk Oblast	178,200	Federal subject of Russia.
Nenets Autonomous Okrug	176,700	Federal subject of Russia.
Somaliland	176,210	Historic region of Somalia.
(China) Guizhou	176,000	Province of China.
Uruguay	175,016	Country in South America.
(Kenya) Rift Valley Province	173,854	Largest province of Kenya.
(Saudi Arabia) Al Madinah (Medina)	173,000	Third largest province of Saudi Arabia.
Republic of Karelia	172,400	Federal subject of Russia.
(Mali) Gao Region	170,572	Second largest region of Mali.
Tuva Republic	170,500	Federal subject of Russia.
Florida	170,304	State of the United States.
(Democratic Republic of the Congo) Kasai-Oriental	170,302	Province of the Democratic Republic of the Congo.
Wisconsin	169,639	State of the United States.
Altai Krai	169,100	Federal subject of Russia.
Eastern Cape	168,966	Second largest province of South Africa.
(Yemen) Hadhramaut Governorate	167,280	Largest governorate of Yemen.
(China) Jiangxi	167,000	Province of China.
(China) Henan	167,000	Province of China.
Primorsky Krai	165,900	Federal subject of Russia.
(Kazakhstan) Mangystau Province	165,600	Province of Kazakhstan.
Karakalpakstan	165,600	Largest region of Uzbekistan.
(Ömnögovi Province) Ömnögovi	165,400	Largest aimag of Mongolia.
Córdoba	165,321	Province of Argentina.
Kingdom of the Burgundians	164,166	A Germanic Kingdom in west-central France, lasting from 411-533.
(Saudi Arabia) Makkah Province	164,000	Province of Saudi Arabia.
Suriname	163,820	Country in South America.
Tunisia	163,610	Country in Africa.
(Algeria) Béchar Province	162,200	Province of Algeria.
Tyumen Oblast	161,800	Federal subject of Russia.
(Madagascar) Toliara Province	161,405	Largest Province of Madagascar.
(Namibia) ǁKaras Region	161,215	Largest region of Namibia.
Padania	160,908	Regional Area of Northern Italy as claimed by the Lega Nord
Perm Krai	160,600	Federal subject of Russia.
(Kenya) Eastern Province	159,891	Second largest Province of Kenya.
Amhara Region	159,174	Third largest region of Ethiopia.
(Algeria) Tindouf Province	159,000	Province of Algeria.
(Sudan) South Kordufan	158,355	State of Sudan.
Shan State	158,222	Largest state of Myanmar (Myanmar has certain administrative divisions titled as Divisions, and others titled as States).
(China) Shanxi	156,300	Province of China.
Odisha	155,707	State of India.
Salta	155,488	Province of Argentina.
Georgia (U.S. state)	153,909	State of the United States.
(China) Shandong	153,800	Province of China.
Central Kalimantan	153,564	Province of Indonesia.
Acre	152,581	State of Brazil.
(Mali) Kidal Region	151,430	Third largest region of Mali.
West Kazakhstan Province	151,300	Province of Kazakhstan.
(New Zealand) South Island	150,437	Largest island of New Zealand.
(Madagascar) Mahajanga Province	150,023	Second largest Province of Madagascar.
Old Assyrian period	150,000	An ancient Middle Eastern kingdom in the Fertile Crescent, lasting from 1920-1740 BC.
Illinois	149,998	State of the United States.
Coahuila	149,982	State of Mexico.
Mendoza	148,827	Province of Argentina.
Ceará	148,826	State of Brazil.
(Democratic Republic of the Congo) Bas-Uele	148,331	Province of the Democratic Republic of the Congo.
(Zambia) Northern Province	147,826	Largest province of Zambia.
(Botswana) Central District	147,730	Largest district of Botswana.
Nepal	147,181	Country in South Asia.
West Kalimantan	146,807	Province of Indonesia.
(China) Liaoning	145,900	Province of China.
Iowa	145,743	State of the United States.
Vologda Oblast	145,700	Federal subject of Russia.
(Niger) Zinder Department	145,430	Second largest department of Niger.
Murmansk Oblast	144,900	Federal subject of Russia.
(Iran) Razavi Khorasan province	144,681	Third largest province of Iran.
(Kazakhstan) Zhambyl Province	144,000	Province of Kazakhstan.
Bangladesh	143,998	Country in Southeast Asia.
Bashkortostan	143,600	Federal subject of Russia.
La Pampa	143,440	Province of Argentina.
Tajikistan	143,100	Country in Central Asia.
Amapá	142,815	State of Brazil.
(Govi-Altai Province) Govi-Altai	141,400	Second largest aimag of Mongolia.
New York	141,299	State of the United States.
Sindh	140,914	Third largest province of Pakistan.
(Niger) Diffa Department	140,216	Third largest department of Niger.
Omsk Oblast	139,700	Federal subject of Russia.
(China) Anhui	139,700	Province of China.
(Morocco) Laâyoune-Boujdour-Sakia El Hamra	139,480	Largest region of Morocco.
Republic of Yucatán	139,426	Sovereign country in North America, 1841–1848.
North Carolina	139,389	State of the United States.
(Saudi Arabia) Al Jawf Province	139,000	Province of Saudi Arabia.
(Indonesia) Java	138,794	Island of Indonesia.
(Turkmenistan) Balkan Province	138,000	Largest province of Turkmenistan.
Arkansas	137,732	State of the United States.
Santiago del Estero	136,351	Province of Argentina.
Alabama	135,765	State of the United States.
Chhattisgarh	135,194	State of India.
(Democratic Republic of the Congo) Tanganyika Province	134,940	Province of the Democratic Republic of the Congo.
Louisiana	134,264	State of the United States.
La Paz Department	133,985	Third largest department of Bolivia.
Santa Fe	133,007	Province of Argentina.
(Democratic Republic of the Congo) Tshuapa	132,940	Province of the Democratic Republic of the Congo.
(Democratic Republic of the Congo) Haut-Katanga Province	132,425	Province of the Democratic Republic of the Congo.
(Antártica Chilena Province) Magallanes and Antártica Chilena	132,297	Largest region of Chile (including Antarctic claims).
(Democratic Republic of the Congo) Maniema	132,250	Province of the Democratic Republic of the Congo.
Greece	131,957	Country in Europe.
England	130,395	Largest constituent country of the United Kingdom.
Tamil Nadu	130,058	State of India.
Nicaragua	130,000	Largest country in Central America; excludes San Andrés y Providencia islands (disputed territories with Colombia).
(Botswana) North-West District	129,930	Second largest district of Botswana.
Free State (South African province)	129,825	Third largest province of South Africa.
Kingdom of Poland	129,707	Medieval central European Kingdom, lasting from 1025-1569 when it formed a union with Lithuania. Size is approximate.
Western Cape	129,462	Province of South Africa.
(Iran) Yazd province	129,285	Province of Iran.
(Mozambique) Niassa Province	129,056	Largest province of Mozambique.
Czechoslovakia	127,900	Central European country between 1918 and 1992.
(Democratic Republic of the Congo) Mai-Ndombe Province	127,465	Province of the Democratic Republic of the Congo.
(Sudan) South Darfur	127,300	State of Sudan.
(Saudi Arabia) Northern Borders Region	127,000	Province of Saudi Arabia.
(Kenya) North Eastern Province	126,902	Third largest province of Kenya.
(Zambia) Western Province	126,386	Second largest province of Zambia.
(Zambia) North-Western Province	125,827	Third largest province of Zambia.
Limpopo	125,754	Province of South Africa.
Mississippi	125,434	State of the United States.
(Antofagasta Region) Antofagasta	125,306	Largest region of Chile (excluding Antarctic claims).
(Saudi Arabia) Ha'il Province	125,000	Province of Saudi Arabia.
(Kazakhstan) Pavlodar Province	124,800	Province of Kazakhstan.
Sarawak	124,450	Largest state of Malaysia.
Orenburg Oblast	124,000	Federal subject of Russia.
(Dornod Province) Dornod	123,600	Third largest aimag of Mongolia.
North Kazakhstan Province	123,200	Province of Kazakhstan.
Durango	123,181	State of Mexico.
(Morocco) Guelmim-Es Semara	122,825	Second largest region of Morocco.
(Iran) Fars province	122,608	Province of Iran.
(Sudan) Jungoli	122,479	State of Sudan.
(Tsardom of Bulgaria (1908–1946)) Kingdom of Bulgaria	122,134	Measured at apex before WWI.
(Sudan) River Nile	122,123	State of Sudan.
(Kazakhstan) Akmola Province	121,400	Province of Kazakhstan.
(Democratic Republic of the Congo) Lualaba Province	121,308	Province of the Democratic Republic of the Congo.
(China) Fujian	121,300	Province of China.
Kirov Oblast	120,800	Federal subject of Russia.
North Korea	120,538	Country in Asia.
Emirate of Granada	120,337	Moorish Vassal to the Kingdom of Castile lasting from 1228-1492, measured at its apex in 1228.
(Mali) Kayes Region	119,743	Region of Mali.
Overseas France	119,396	Consists of all the French-administered territories outside Europe.
Pennsylvania	119,283	State of the United States.
(Saudi Arabia) Najran Province	119,000	Province of Saudi Arabia.
South Kazakhstan Province	118,600	Province of Kazakhstan.
(Kazakhstan) Atyrau Province	118,600	Province of Kazakhstan.
Malawi	118,484	Country in Africa.
Potosí Department	118,218	Department of Bolivia.
(Botswana) Ghanzi District	117,910	Third largest district of Botswana.
Eritrea	117,600	Country in Africa. Includes Badme region.
Lake Michigan-Huron	117,300	Lake in North America, between Canada and the United States.
Ohio	116,096	State of the United States.
(Bayankhongor Province) Bayankhongor	116,000	Aimag of Mongolia.
Puntland	116,000	Historic region of Somalia.
(Greenland) Qeqqata	115,500	Second smallest municipality of Greenland.
(Namibia) Kunene Region	115,293	Second largest region of Namibia.
Telangana	114,840	A state of India, which was formed on 2 June 2014.
(Chad) Kanem	114,520	Second largest region of Chad.
Volgograd Oblast	113,900	Federal subject of Russia.
(New Zealand) North Island	113,729	Second largest island of New Zealand.
Benin	112,622	Country in Africa.
(Ethiopia) Southern Nations, Nationalities, and People's Region	112,343	Region of Ethiopia.
(Magallanes y la Antártica Chilena Region) Magallanes and Antártica Chilena	112,310	Second largest region of Chile (excluding Antarctic claims).
Honduras	112,088	Country in Central America.
Kingdom of Sicily	111,900	A medieval kingdom centered on the Island of Sicily and in southern Italy, lasting from 1130-1282.
Kingdom of the Two Sicilies	111,900	A kingdom centered on the Island of Sicily and in southern Italy, lasting from 1811-1861.
Liberia	111,369	Country in Africa.
Bulgaria	110,912	Country in Europe.
Cuba	110,861	Largest country in the Caribbean.
(Uzbekistan) Navoiy Region	110,800	Second largest region of Uzbekistan.
Virginia	110,785	State of the United States.
(Philippines) Luzon	109,965	Island of the Philippines.
(Amazonas (Colombian department)) Amazonas Department	109,665	Largest district of Colombia.
(Namibia) Hardap Region	109,651	Third largest region of Namibia.
(Dornogovi Province) Dornogovi	109,500	Aimag of Mongolia.
Tennessee	109,151	State of the United States.
(Cameroon) East Province	109,011	Largest province of Cameroon.
Guatemala	108,889	Country in Central America.
(Canada) Newfoundland	108,860	Island in Canada.
East Germany	108,333	Former country in Europe from 1949 to 1990; now reunified into Germany.
(Democratic Republic of the Congo) Haut-Lomami Province	108,204	Province of the Democratic Republic of the Congo.
(Saudi Arabia) Tabuk Province	108,000	Province of Saudi Arabia.
(Aysén Region) Aisén	107,153	Third largest region of Chile.
(Iran) Isfahan province	107,029	Province of Iran.
(Botswana) Kgalagadi District	106,940	District of Botswana.
(Niger) Tahoua Department	106,677	Department of Niger.
Cuba (main island)	105,806	Main island of the Caribbean country of Cuba.
(Namibia) Otjozondjupa	105,185	Region of Namibia.
(Mozambique) Zambezia Province	105,008	Second largest province of Mozambique.
(Democratic Republic of the Congo) Sankuru	105,000	Province of the Democratic Republic of the Congo.
(South Africa) North West	104,882	Province of South Africa.
Kentucky	104,659	State of the United States.
Kingdom of Aragon	103,088	Constituent Kingdom of Spain lasting from 1035-1515.
Iceland	103,000	Country in Europe.
Anangu Pitjantjatjara Yankunytjatja	103,000	Australian local government area
(Angola) Lunda Norte Province	102,783	Third largest province of Angola.
Catamarca	102,602	Province of Argentina.
(China) Jiangsu	102,600	Province of China.
(Madagascar) Fianarantsoa Province	102,373	Third largest Province of Madagascar.
(China) Zhejiang	102,000	Province of China.
(Department of Ucayali) Ucayali Region	101,831	Second largest region of Peru.
Rostov Oblast	100,800	Federal subject of Russia.
(Mozambique) Tete Province	100,724	Third largest province of Mozambique.
(Khövsgöl Province) Khövsgöl	100,600	Aimag of Mongolia.
Vichada Department	100,242	Second largest district of Colombia.
Saratov Oblast	100,200	Federal subject of Russia.
Chaco	99,633	Province of Argentina.
South Korea	99,538	Country in Asia.
(Oman) Dhofar Governorate	99,300	Largest governorate of Oman.
Sagaing Region	99,150	Largest region of Myanmar, second largest administrative entity (Myanmar has certain administrative divisions titled as Regions, and others titled as States).
(Finland) Lapland	98,946	Largest province of Finland.
Norrbotten County	98,911	Largest county of Sweden.
Pernambuco	98,312	State of Brazil.
(Western Province (Papua New Guinea)) Western Province (Papua New Guinea)	98,189	Largest Province of Papua New Guinea.
(Angola) Malanje Province	97,602	Province of Angola.
(Philippines) Mindanao	97,530	Second-largest island of the Philippines.
(Iran) Semnan Province	97,491	Province of Iran.
Afar Region	96,707	Region of Ethiopia.
(Mali) Koulikoro Region	95,848	Region of Mali.
(Democratic Republic of the Congo) Kasaï Province	95,631	Province of the Democratic Republic of the Congo.
Kemerovo Oblast	95,500	Federal subject of Russia.
Santa Catarina	95,346	State of Brazil.
(Mauritania) Tagant	95,200	Region of Mauritania.
(Turkmenistan) Ahal Province	95,000	Second largest province of Turkmenistan.
(Zambia) Central Province	94,395	Province of Zambia.
KwaZulu-Natal	94,361	Third smallest province of South Africa.
Indiana	94,321	State of the United States.
Castile and León	94,223	Largest autonomous community of Spain.
Bihar	94,164	State of India.
Neuquén	94,078	Province of Argentina.
(Turkmenistan) Lebap Province	94,000	Province of Turkmenistan.
Oaxaca	93,952	State of Mexico.
(South Sudan) West Bahr-al-Ghazal	93,900	Second largest state of South Sudan.
Hungary	93,032	Country in Central Europe.
Altai Republic	92,600	Federal subject of Russia.
Portugal	91,982	Country in Europe. Includes Azores and Madeira Islands.
(Boquerón Department) Boquerón department	91,669	Largest department of Paraguay.
Maine	91,646	State of the United States.
(Russia) Novaya Zemlya	90,650	Archipelago part of Russia.
(Democratic Republic of the Congo) Kwango	89,974	Province of the Democratic Republic of the Congo.
(Democratic Republic of the Congo) Haut-Uele	89,683	Province of the Democratic Republic of the Congo.
La Rioja	89,680	Province of Argentina.
San Juan	89,651	Province of Argentina.
(Niger) Tillabéri Department	89,623	Department of Niger.
(Angola) Cunene Province	89,342	Province of Angola.
Jordan	89,342	Country in Middle East.
Caquetá Department	88,965	Third largest district of Colombia.
(Chad) Batha Region	88,800	Third largest region of Chad.
Serbia	88,361	Country in Europe. Includes UN-administered territory of Kosovo.
Corrientes	88,199	Province of Argentina.
Chelyabinsk Oblast	87,900	Federal subject of Russia.
Kachin State	87,808	Second largest state of Myanmar, third largest administrative entity (Myanmar has certain administrative divisions titled as Regions, and others titled as States).
Andalusia	87,268	Second largest autonomous community of Spain.
Sakhalin Oblast	87,100	Federal subject of Russia.
(Turkmenistan) Mary Province	87,000	Second smallest province of Turkmenistan.
(Central African Republic) Haute-Kotto	86,650	Largest prefecture of the Central African Republic.
Azerbaijan	86,600	Country in Central Asia. Includes the exclave of Nakhichevan Autonomous Republic and the Nagorno-Karabakh region.
Kingdom of Naples	86,192	A medieval kingdom centered in southern Italy, lasting from 1282-1811/1816.
(Algeria) Ghardaïa Province	86,105	Province of Algeria.
Meta Department	85,635	District of Colombia.
Northern Region, Uganda	85,391.7	Largest region of Uganda.
(Department of Madre de Dios) Madre de Dios Region	85,301	Third largest region of Peru.
(Zambia) Southern Province	85,283	Province of Zambia.
Giza Governorate	85,153	Governorate of Egypt.
(Namibia) Omaheke	84,612	Region of Namibia.
Leningrad Oblast	84,500	Federal subject of Russia.
Ireland	84,421	An island off the northwest coast of Europe.
Tver Oblast	84,100	Federal subject of Russia.
Nouvelle-Aquitaine	84,036	Largest region of France.
Austria	83,858	Country in Europe.
(India) Arunachal Pradesh	83,743	State of India.
(Kenya) Coast Province	83,603	Province of Kenya.
United Arab Emirates	83,600	Country in Middle East.
French Guiana	83,534	Largest overseas department of France.
Hokkaidō	83,424.31	Largest prefecture of Japan.
South Carolina	82,932	State of the United States.
(Morocco) Oriental	82,900	Third largest region of Morocco.
(Mozambique) Cabo Delgado Province	82,625	Province of Mozambique.
(South Sudan) East Equatoria	82,542	State of South Sudan.
(Zavkhan Province) Zavkhan	82,500	Aimag of Mongolia.
Lake Superior	82,414	Lake in North America, between Canada and the United States.
(China) Chongqing	82,403	Largest direct-controlled municipality of China.
(Alto Paraguay Department) Alto Paraguay	82,349	Second largest department of Paraguay.
(Sükhbaatar Province) Sükhbaatar	82,300	Aimag of Mongolia.
Riau	82,232	Province of Indonesia.
(Mozambique) Nampula Province	81,606	Province of Mozambique.
Kingdom of León	81,342	A medieval kingdom constituent of Spain, lasting from 910-1301. Measured at its apex after 1030.
(Saudi Arabia) 'Asir	81,000	Province of Saudi Arabia.
Jalisco	80,386	State of Mexico.
(Khentii Province) Khentii	80,300	Aimag of Mongolia.
Jharkhand	79,700	State of India.
(Oman) Al Wusta Governorate	79,700	Second largest governorate of Oman.
Castile-La Mancha	79,463	Third largest autonomous community of Spain.
(Sudan) West Darfur	79,460	State of Sudan.
Tamaulipas	79,384	State of Mexico.
(South Sudan) West Equatoria	79,319	Third largest tate of South Sudan.
(Morocco) Meknès-Tafilalet	79,210	Region of Morocco.
(Mali) Mopti Region	79,017	Region of Mali.
(Algeria) El Bayadh Province	78,870	Province of Algeria.
Czech Republic	78,866	Country in Central Europe.
Entre Ríos	78,781	Province of Argentina.
Scotland	78,772	Second largest constituent country of the United Kingdom.
Assam	78,483	State of India.
(Atacama Region) Atacama	78,268	Region of Chile.
(Democratic Republic of the Congo) Kwilu Province	78,219	Province of the Democratic Republic of the Congo.
Bohai Sea	78,000	A marginal sea in China.
(Sudan) Upper Nile	77,773	State of South Sudan.
Nizhny Novgorod Oblast	76,900	Federal subject of Russia.
Gadsden Purchase	76,800	Territory in Arizona acquired by the US in 1854.
San Luis	76,748	Province of Argentina.
Apure	76,500	Third largest state of Venezuela.
Mpumalanga	76,495	Second smallest province of South Africa.
(Chad) Ouaddaï	76,240	Region of Chad.
(Tanzania) Tabora	76,151	Largest region of Tanzania.
Sabah	76,115	Second largest state of Malaysia.
Republic of Kalmykia	76,100	Federal subject of Russia.
(Khovd Province) Khovd	76,100	Aimag of Mongolia.
Krasnodar Krai	76,000	Federal subject of Russia.
(Mozambique) Gaza Province	75,709	Province of Mozambique.
Panama	75,517	Country in Central America.
(Sudan) Gedarif	75,263	State of Sudan.
(Tanzania) Rukwa	75,240	Second largest region of Tanzania.
Benelux Union	75,140	A politico- economic union compromising Belgium, the Netherlands and Luxembourg.
(Zimbabwe) Matabeleland North	75,025	Largest province of Zimbabwe.
(Angola) Huíla Province	75,002	Province of Angola.
(Dundgovi Province) Dundgovi	74,700	Aimag of Mongolia.
(Khyber Pakhtunkhwa) North-West Frontier Province	74,521	Province of Pakistan.
(Indonesia) Maluku Islands	74,505	Archipelago in eastern Indonesia.
Chiapas	74,211	State of Mexico.
Western Finland	74,185	Second largest province of Finland.
(Töv Province) Töv	74,000	Aimag of Mongolia.
(Turkmenistan) Daşoguz Province	74,000	Smallest province of Turkmenistan.
Hispaniola	73,929	Island in the Caribbean split between the countries of Haiti and Dominican Republic.
Baja California Sur	73,475	State of Mexico.
Kingdom of Castile	73,299	A medieval kingdom constituent of Spain, lasting from 1035-1230.
Zacatecas	73,252	State of Mexico.
New Brunswick	72,908	Province of Canada.
(Presidente Hayes Department) Presidente Hayes	72,907	Third largest department of Paraguay.
South Sulawesi	72,781	Province of Indonesia.
(Nigeria) Borno State	72,767	Largest state of Nigeria.
Occitanie	72,724	Second largest region in Metropolitan France.
(Libya) Ghat District	72,700	District of Libya.
Federally Administered Northern Areas, Pakistan	72,520	Province of Pakistan.
(Russia) Sakhalin	72,493	Island in Russia.
Guainía Department	72,238	District of Colombia.
(Guinea) Kankan Region	72,145	Largest region of Guinea.
Formosa	72,066	Province of Argentina.
(Nigeria) Niger State	72,065	Second largest state of Nigeria.
Cusco Region	71,986	Region of Peru.
(Madagascar) Toamasina Province	71,911	Province of Madagascar.
Sierra Leone	71,740	Country in Africa.
Veracruz	71,699	State of Mexico.
North Sumatra	71,680	Province of Indonesia.
Kurgan Oblast	71,000	Federal subject of Russia.
(Morocco) Souss-Massa-Drâa	70,880	Region of Morocco.
(Tanzania) Morogoro	70,799	Third largest region of Tanzania.
(Iran) Hormozgan Province	70,669	Province of Iran.
Bavaria	70,549	Largest state of Germany.
Catalan Countries	70,520	The territories where Catalan language is spoken
(Ghana) Northern Region	70,383	Largest region of Ghana.
(Angola) Bié Province	70,314	Province of Angola.
(Mali) Sikasso Region	70,280	Region of Mali.
Republic of Ireland	70,273	Country in Europe.
(Canada) Banks Island	70,028	Island in the Arctic Archipelago.
Baja California	69,921	State of Mexico.
Auvergne-Rhône-Alpes	69,711	Third largest region in Metropolitan France.
Georgia	69,700	Country in Caucasus.
(Uvs Province) Uvs	69,600	Aimag of Mongolia.
(Iran) South Khorasan Province	69,555	Province of Iran.
Lake Victoria	69,485	Lake in Africa between Kenya, Tanzania, and Uganda.
(Zambia) Eastern Province	69,106	Province of Zambia.
(Cameroon) Centre Province	68,926	Second largest province of Cameroon.
(Mozambique) Inhambane Province	68,615	Province of Mozambique.
Tasmania	68,401	State of Australia.
Central Sulawesi	68,089	Province of Indonesia.
(Mozambique) Sofala Province	68,018	Province of Mozambique.
Republic of Tatarstan	68,000	Federal subject of Russia.
(Mauritania) Trarza	67,800	Region of Mauritania.
(Emirate of Abu Dhabi) Abu Dhabi Emirate	67,340	Largest emirate of the United Arab Emirates.
(Yemen) Al Mahrah Governorate	67,310	Second largest governorate of Yemen.
Kingdom of Toledo	67,273	A kingdom of the Spanish reconquista lasting from 1085-1212.
Puno Region	66,997	Region of Peru.
(Japan) Tōhoku region	66,947.25	Region of Japan containing the prefectures of Aomori, Iwate, Miyagi, Akita, Yamagata and Fukushima.
(Japan) Chūbu region	66,806.31	Region of Japan containing the prefectures of Niigata, Toyama, Ishikawa, Fukui, Yamanashi, Nagano, Gifu, Shizuoka and Aichi.
Stavropol Krai	66,500	Federal subject of Russia.
(Tanzania) Ruvuma	66,477	Region of Tanzania.
(Algeria) Djelfa Province	66,415	Province of Algeria.
(China) Ningxia	66,400	Smallest autonomous region of China.
(Tanzania) Lindi	66,046	Region of Tanzania.
(Republic of the Congo) Likouala	66,044	Largest department of the Republic of the Congo.
(Democratic Republic of the Congo) Ituri Province	65,658	Province of the Democratic Republic of the Congo.
Sri Lanka	65,610	Country in Asia.
(Cameroon) North Province	65,576	Third largest province of Cameroon.
Lithuania	65,300	Country in Europe.
(Democratic Republic of the Congo) Sud-Kivu	65,070	Province of the Democratic Republic of the Congo.
(Saudi Arabia) Al-Qassim Province	65,000	Province of Saudi Arabia.
Guárico	64,986	State of Venezuela.
(Mali) Ségou Region	64,821	Smallest region of Mali (excluding the Capital district).
Latvia	64,600	Country in Europe.
Guerrero	64,281	State of Mexico.
Nuevo León	64,210	State of Mexico.
(Tajikistan) Gorno-Badakhshan	64,200	Largest province of Tajikistan.
(Iran) Khuzestan Province	64,055	Province of Iran.
Lincoln Sea	64,000	Sea of the Arctic Ocean.
Pando Department	63,827	Department of Bolivia.
Antioquia Department	63,612	District of Colombia.
(Namibia) Erongo Region	63,579	Region of Namibia.
Arequipa Region	63,345	Region of Peru.
Zulia	63,100	State of Venezuela.
San Luis Potosí	63,068	State of Mexico.
(Chad) Salamat	63,000	Region of Chad.
(Övörkhangai Province) Övörkhangai	62,900	Aimag of Mongolia.
West Virginia	62,755	State of the United States.
(Cameroon) Adamawa Province	63,691	Province of Cameroon.
(Tanzania) Mbeya	62,420	Region of Tanzania.
Svalbard	62,045	Norway Arctic Ocean Territory.
Republic of Khakassia	61,900	Federal subject of Russia.
(Mozambique) Manica Province	61,661	Province of Mozambique.
Central Region, Uganda	61,403.2	Second largest region of Uganda.
(Central African Republic) Mbomou	61,150	Second largest prefecture of the Central African Republic.
Kostroma Oblast	60,100	Federal subject of Russia.
Michoacán	59,928	State of Mexico.
Lake Huron	59,596	Lake in North America, between Canada and the United States.
(Democratic Republic of the Congo) Nord-Kivu	59,483	Province of the Democratic Republic of the Congo.
(Nigeria) Taraba State	59,180	Third largest state of Nigeria.
(Democratic Republic of the Congo) Kasaï-Central	59,111	Province of the Democratic Republic of the Congo.
(Chad) Guéra	58,950	Region of Chad.
(Tanzania) Iringa	58,936	Region of Tanzania.
(Angola) Uíge Province	58,698	Province of Angola.
(Afghanistan) Helmand Province	58,584	Largest province of Afghanistan.
Sinaloa	58,328	State of Mexico.
(Madagascar) Antananarivo Province	58,283	Province of Madagascar.
(Central African Republic) Bamingui-Bangoran	58,200	Third largest prefecture of the Central African Republic.
(Democratic Republic of the Congo) Mongala	58,141	Province of the Democratic Republic of the Congo.
(Angola) Namibe Province	58,137	Province of Angola.
Lake Michigan	58,000	Lake in North America, between Canada and the United States.
Grand Est	57,441	Region in northeastern France.
(Zimbabwe) Mashonaland West	57,441	Second largest province of Zimbabwe.
Aceh	57,366	Province of Indonesia.
(Finland) Oulu Province	57,000	Province of Finland.
Togo	56,785	Country in Africa.
(Democratic Republic of the Congo) Nord-Ubangi	56,644	Province of the Democratic Republic of the Congo.
Croatia	56,594	Country in Europe.
(Zimbabwe) Masvingo	56,566	Third largest province of Zimbabwe.
Paraíba	56,440	State of Brazil.
(Democratic Republic of the Congo) Lomami Province	56,426	Province of the Democratic Republic of the Congo.
(Republic of the Congo) Sangha	55,800	Second largest department of the Republic of the Congo.
(China) Pearl River Delta Metropolitan Region	55,800	Area surrounding the Pearl River estuary, where the Pearl River flows into the South China Sea. It is namely the Guangdong–Hong Kong–Macao Greater Bay Area in Chinese official documents.
Himachal Pradesh	55,673	State of India.
(Angola) Cuanza Sul Province	55,660	Province of Angola.
Cochabamba Department	55,631	Department of Bolivia.
(Central African Republic) Haut-Mbomou	55,530	Prefecture of the Central African Republic.
Västerbotten County	55,401	Second largest county of Sweden.
Pskov Oblast	55,300	Federal subject of Russia.
Novgorod Oblast	55,300	Federal subject of Russia.
(Arkhangai Province) Arkhangai	55,300	Aimag of Mongolia.
Western Region, Uganda	55,276.6	Second smallest region of Uganda.
(Canada) Devon Island	55,247	Island in the Arctic Archipelago, largest uninhabited island in the world.
(Afghanistan) Herat Province	54,778	Second largest province of Afghanistan.
(Algeria) El Oued Province	54,573	Province of Algeria.
(Zimbabwe) Matabeleland South	54,172	Province of Zimbabwe.
Vaupés Department	54,135	District of Colombia.
(Afghanistan) Kandahar Province	54,022	Third largest province of Afghanistan.
(Democratic Republic of the Congo) Kongo Central	53,920	Province of the Democratic Republic of the Congo.
Samara Oblast	53,600	Federal subject of Russia.
Oruro Department	53,588	Department of Bolivia.
Uttarakhand	53,566	State of India.
Guaviare Department	53,460	District of Colombia.
Jambi	53,437	Province of Indonesia.
South Sumatra	53,435	Province of Indonesia.
(Mauritania) Hodh El Gharbi	53,400	Region of Mauritania.
Nova Scotia	53,338	Province of Canada.
Jujuy	53,219	Province of Argentina.
Rio Grande do Norte	52,797	State of Brazil.
(Democratic Republic of the Congo) Sud-Ubangi	51,648	Province of the Democratic Republic of the Congo.
Voronezh Oblast	52,400	Federal subject of Russia.
(Czech Republic) Bohemia	52,065	Historical region of the Czech Republic.
Chuquisaca Department	51,524	Department of Bolivia.
San Martín Region	51,253	Region of Peru.
Bosnia and Herzegovina	51,197	Country in Europe.
Costa Rica	51,180	Country in Central America. Includes Isla del Coco.
(Morocco) Oued Ed-Dahab-Lagouira	50,880	Region of Morocco.
Campeche	50,812	State of Mexico.
(Tanzania) Shinyanga	50,781	Region of Tanzania.
(Los Lagos Region) Los Lagos	50,609	Region of Chile.
(Zambia) Luapula Province	50,567	Province of Zambia.
(Pakistan) Chagai	50,545	Largest District of Pakistan
(Punjab, Pakistan) Punjab	50,362	State of India.
Republic of Dagestan	50,300	Federal subject of Russia.
(Central African Republic) Ouham	50,250	Prefecture of the Central African Republic.
Quintana Roo	50,212	State of Mexico.
Tigray Region	50,079	Region of Ethiopia.
(Central African Republic) Ouaka	49,900	Prefecture of the Central African Republic.
Smolensk Oblast	49,800	Federal subject of Russia.
Bago Region	49,787	Second largest region of Myanmar, fourth largest administrative entity (Myanmar has certain administrative divisions titled as Regions, and others titled as States).
(Jämtland County) Jamtland County	49,444	Third largest county of Sweden.
(Tanzania) Singida	49,341	Region of Tanzania.
Benishangul-Gumuz Region	49,289	Region of Ethiopia.
(Zimbabwe) Midlands	49,166	Province of Zimbabwe.
Alexander Island	49,070	Island part of Antarctica.
Slovakia	49,033	Country in Europe.
(Russia) Severny Island	48,904	Island part of Novaya Zemlya in Russia.
Eastern Finland	48,726	Second smallest province of Finland.
(Bulgan Province) Bulgan	48,700	Aimag of Mongolia.
Dominican Republic	48,671	Country in the Caribbean. Includes The Mainland Dominican Republic, Saona Island, and others under Control Of Dominican Government
Finnmark	48,637	Largest county of Norway.
(Afghanistan) Farah Province	48,471	Province of Afghanistan.
(Namibia) Okavango Region	48,463	Region of Namibia.
(Nigeria) Bauchi State	48,197	State of Nigeria.
Tierra del Fuego	48,100	Archipelago in southern South America.
Isla Grande de Tierra del Fuego	47,992	Island divided between Chile and Argentina.
East Java	47,922	Province of Indonesia.
(Tanzania) Manyara	47,913	Region of Tanzania.
East Nusa Tenggara	47,876	Province of Indonesia.
Bourgogne-Franche-Comté	47,784	Region of France.
Aragon	47,719	Autonomous community of Spain.
Lower Saxony	47,618	Second largest state of Germany.
Estonia	47,549	Country in Northern Europe. De jure size – 2,321 km^{2} were annexed by Russia.
(Cameroon) South Province	47,110	Province of Cameroon.
Maluku	46,975	Province of Indonesia.
Muisca Confederation	46,972	Loose confederation of Muisca speaking chiefdoms in central Colombia until 1540
(Chad) Wadi Fira	46,850	Region of Chad.
(Mauritania) Inchiri	46,800	Region of Mauritania.
(Burkina Faso) Est	46,694	Region of Burkina Faso.
Chocó Department	46,530	District of Colombia.
(Central African Republic) Vakaga	46,500	Prefecture of the Central African Republic.
Espírito Santo	46,078	State of Brazil.
(Gabon) Ogooué-Ivindo	46,075	Largest province of Gabon.
Galmudug	46,000	Historic region of Somalia.
Moscow Oblast	45,900	Federal subject of Russia.
(Sudan) Blue Nile	45,844	State of Sudan.
(Bayan-Ölgii Province) Bayan-Ölgii	45,700	Aimag of Mongolia.
(Iran) East Azarbaijan Province	45,650	Province of Iran.
(Angola) Lunda Sul Province	45,649	Province of Angola.
Kingdom of Asturias	45,409	A post Visigothic Kingdom in the Iberian peninsula after the Muslim conquest, lasting from 785–925.
Estonia	45,228	Country in Northern Europe. Includes 1,520 islands in the Baltic Sea. De facto size – the remaining 2,321 km^{2} were annexed by Russia.
(Tanzania) Kigoma	45,066	Region of Tanzania.
(Nigeria) Yobe State	44,880	State of Nigeria.
Magway Region	44,799	Region of Myanmar (Myanmar has certain administrative divisions titled as Regions, and others titled as States).
Casanare Department	44,640	District of Colombia.
(New Zealand) Canterbury	44,638	Largest region of New Zealand.
(Nigeria) Kaduna State	44,217	State of Nigeria.
Haryana	44,212	State of India.
Naryn Region	44,160	Largest region of Kyrgyzstan.
Astrakhan Oblast	44,100	Federal subject of Russia.
(Afghanistan) Badakhshan Province	44,059	Province of Afghanistan.
Berkner Island	43,873	Island part of Antarctica.
(Department of Ayacucho) Ayacucho Region	43,815	Region of Peru.
Transkei	43,798	Unrecognised Bantustan of South Africa.
Issyk-Kul Region	43,735	Second largest region of Kyrgyzstan.
Rio de Janeiro	43,696	State of Brazil.
East Sepik Province	43,426	Second largest province of Papua New Guinea.
Tanintharyi Region	43,328	Region of Myanmar (Myanmar has certain administrative divisions titled as Regions, and others titled as States).
Anzoátegui	43,300	State of Venezuela.
Penza Oblast	43,200	Federal subject of Russia.
(Canada) Axel Heiberg Island	43,178	Island in the Arctic Archipelago.
Denmark	43,094	Country in Europe. Includes Denmark proper only; the entire Kingdom of Denmark, including Greenland and Faroe Islands covers 2,220,093 km^{2}.
(Madagascar) Antsiranana Province	43,046	Smallest Province of Madagascar.
(Senegal) Tambacounda Region	42,706	Largest region of Senegal.
Upper Peninsula of Michigan	42,610	Geographic subdivision of the U.S. State of Michigan.
Kingdom of the Netherlands	42,437	Country in Europe and the Caribbean.
Southern Cameroons	42,383	Area claimed by the Republic of Ambazonia in Cameroon.
West Sumatra	42,297	Province of Indonesia.
(Canada) Melville Island	42,149	Island in the Arctic Archipelago.
Udmurt Republic	42,100	Federal subject of Russia.
Greater Pibor	41,962	An administrative area in South Sudan.
(Republic of the Congo) Cuvette	41,800	Third largest department of the Republic of the Congo. Area is approximate, as sources conflict.
Extremadura	41,634	Autonomous community of Spain.
Netherlands	41,528	Country in Europe. Includes the Netherlands proper only.
(Tanzania) Dodoma	41,311	Region of Tanzania.
Switzerland	41,284	Country in Europe.
(Canada) Southampton Island	41,214	Island in the Arctic Archipelago.
(Selenge Province) Selenge	41,200	Aimag of Mongolia.
(Tarapacá Region) Tarapacá	41,200	Region of Chile.
(Afghanistan) Nimruz Province	41,005	Province of Afghanistan.
(Syria) Homs	40,940	Largest governorate of Syria.
Minsk Region	40,800	Largest province of Belarus.
Gomel Region (Homiel Region)	40,400	Second largest province of Belarus.
(Lakes (state)) Lakes	40,235	State of South Sudan.
(Ivory Coast) Savanes District	40,210	Largest district of Côte d'Ivoire.
Delta Amacuro	40,200	State of Venezuela.
(Angola) Zaire Province	40,130	Province of Angola.
(Brazil) Marajó	40,100	Island part of Brazil, world's largest fluvial island.
Vitebsk Region (Vitsebsk Region)	40,100	Third largest province of Belarus.
(Coquimbo Region) Coquimbo	39,647	Region of Chile.
(Tanzania) Kagera	39,627	Region of Tanzania.
Ryazan Oblast	39,600	Federal subject of Russia.
(Ghana) Brong-Ahafo Region	39,557	Second largest region of Ghana.
(Yemen) Al Jawf Governorate	39,500	Third largest governorate of Yemen.
Eastern Region, Uganda	39,478.8	Smallest region of Uganda.
(Uzbekistan) Buxoro Region	39,400	Third largest region of Uzbekistan.
(Peru) Amazonas	39,249	Department of Peru
Centre-Val de Loire	39,151	Region of France.
(Yemen) Shabwah Governorate	39,000	Governorate of Yemen.
(Norway) Spitsbergen	38,981	Island part of Svalbard, Norway.
Kerala	38,863	State of India.
(Namibia) Oshikoto Region	38,653	Region of Namibia.
(Niger) Maradi Department	38,581	Department of Niger.
(Gabon) Woleu-Ntem	38,465	Second largest province of Gabon.
Nordland	38,463	County of Norway.
Yucatán	38,402	State of Mexico.
(Republic of the Congo) Plateaux	38,400	Department of the Republic of the Congo.
Bhutan	38,394	Country in Asia.
(Ivory Coast) Zanzan District	38,251	Second largest district of Côte d'Ivoire.
(Turkey) Konya Province	38,157	Largest province of Turkey.
Southeast Sulawesi	38,140	Province of Indonesia.
(Nigeria) Adamawa State	37,957	State of Nigeria.
(Sudan) Sennar	37,844	State of Sudan.
(Gabon) Ngounié	37,750	Third largest province of Gabon.
Junín Region	37,667	Region of Peru.
(Guinea) Nzérékoré Region	37,658	Second largest region of Guinea.
Tarija Department	37,623	Smallest department of Bolivia.
(Iran) West Azarbaijan Province	37,437	Province of Iran.
Ulyanovsk Oblast	37,300	Federal subject of Russia.
Polynesia	37,141	An island chain subdivision of Oceania, including Hawaii.
(Namibia) Khomas Region	37,007	Region of Namibia.
(Oman) Ad Dhahirah Governorate	37,000	Second largest governorate of Oman.
South Kalimantan	36,985	Province of Indonesia.
(Peru) Huánuco Region	36,849	Region of Peru.
(Japan) Kyushu	36,782	Third-largest island of Japan, region containing the prefectures of Fukuoka, Saga, Nagasaki, Kumamoto, Ōita, Miyazaki, Kagoshima and Okinawa.
Rakhine State	36,762	State of Myanmar (Myanmar has certain administrative divisions titled as Regions, and others titled as States).
(Sudan) Kassala	36,710	State of Sudan.
(Mauritania) Assaba	36,600	Region of Mauritania.
(Gabon) Haut-Ogooué	36,547	Province of Gabon.
(Afghanistan) Ghor Province	36,479	Province of Afghanistan.
(Zimbabwe) Manicaland	36,459	Third smallest province of Zimbabwe.
Yaroslavl Oblast	36,400	Federal subject of Russia.
Ash Sharqiyah Region (Oman)	36,400	Largest region of Oman.
Nigeria Kebbi State	36,320	State of Nigeria.
Republic of China	36,188	Territory with disputed status in Asia. Includes only the territories under the administration of the ROC, namely Taiwan, Penghu, Kinmen, and Matsu.
Guinea-Bissau	36,125	Country in Africa.
Chin State	36,009	State of Myanmar (Myanmar has certain administrative divisions titled as Regions, and others titled as States).
(Biobío Region) Biobío	36,007	Region of Chile.
Jewish Autonomous Oblast	36,000	Federal subject of Russia.
Pahang	35,964	Third largest state of Malaysia.
(Unity State) Unity	35,956	State of South Sudan.
Northern Province, Sierra Leone	35,936	Largest province of Sierra Leone.
Ancash Region	35,914	Region of Peru.
(Department of Piura) Piura Region	35,892	Region of Peru.
(Botswana) Kweneng District	35,890	District of Botswana.
(Petén Department) Petén	35,854	Largest department of Guatemala.
Sandaun Province	35,820	Third largest province of Papua New Guinea.
Taiwan	35,801	Largest island under the governance of the Republic of China, referenced elsewhere in this list.
Baden-Württemberg	35,752	Third largest state of Germany.
Masovian Voivodeship (Mazowieckie)	35,728	Largest Voivodeship of Poland.
(Guinea) Faranah Region	35,581	Third largest region of Guinea.
(China) Taiwan	35,581	Province of Taiwan according to the People's Republic of China.
Lampung	35,376	Province of Indonesia.
(Burkina Faso) Sahel	35,360	Region of Burkina Faso.
(China) Hainan	35,354	Smallest province of China.
Barinas	35,200	State of Venezuela.
Ayeyarwady Region	35,167	Region of Myanmar (Myanmar has certain administrative divisions titled as Regions, and others titled as States).
(Papua New Guinea) New Britain	35,145	Island part of Papua New Guinea.
Maakhir	35,000	Historic region of Somalia.
Bryansk Oblast	34,900	Federal subject of Russia.
West Java	34,817	Province of Indonesia.
Lima Region	34,802	Region of Peru.
(Tanzania) Arusha	34,516	Region of Tanzania.
Gulf Province	34,472	Province of Papua New Guinea.
Southern Finland	34,378	Smallest province of Finland.
(Burkina Faso) Boucle du Mouhoun	34,333	Region of Burkina Faso.
Tambov Oblast	34,300	Federal subject of Russia.
(Angola) Huambo Province	34,274	Province of Angola.
Mandalay Region	34,253	Region of Myanmar (Myanmar has certain administrative divisions titled as Regions, and others titled as States).
(Cameroon) Far North Province	34,246	Province of Cameroon.
(Bangladesh) Rajshahi Division	34,235	Largest division of Bangladesh.
North Rhine-Westphalia	34,043	State of Germany.
(China) Hainan	34,000	Province of China.
(Republic of the Congo) Pool	33,955	Department of the Republic of the Congo.
Puebla	33,902	State of Mexico.
Moldova	33,851	Country in Europe. Includes Transnistria (Pridnestrovie).
(Mauritania) Brakna	33,800	Region of Mauritania.
(Nigeria) Kwara State	33,792	State of Nigeria.
Morobe Province	33,705	Province of Papua New Guinea.
(Nigeria) Zamfara State	33,667	State of Nigeria.
(South Sudan) North Bahr-al-Ghazal	33,558	State of South Sudan.
(Canada) Prince of Wales Island	33,339	Island part of the Arctic Archipelago.
(Department of Cajamarca) Cajamarca Region	33,318	Region of Peru.
Odesa Oblast	33,310	Largest oblast of Ukraine.
Nariño Department	33,268	District of Colombia.
(Russia) Yuzhny Island	33,246	Island part of Novaya Zemlya in Russia.
(Eritrea) Gash-Barka region	33,200	Region in Eritrea.
South Sinai Governorate	33,140	Governorate of Egypt.
(Japan) Kansai region	33,125.7	Region of Japan containing the prefectures of Mie, Shiga, Kyōto, Ōsaka, Hyōgo, Nara and Wakayama.
North Caribbean Coast Autonomous Region	33,106	Largest region of Nicaragua.
(Syria) Deir ez-Zor	33,060	Second largest governorate of Syria.
(Australia) Daly River	33,000	Township in the Northern Territory of Australia.
Lake Tanganyika	32,893	Lake in Africa between Tanzania, Democratic Republic of the Congo, Burundi, and Zambia; second deepest lake in the world.
(Jordan) Ma'an	32,832	Governorate of Jordan.
(Bangladesh) Chittagong Division	32,696	Second largest division of Bangladesh.
Central Java	32,548	Province of Indonesia.
(Araucanía Region) Araucanía	32,472	Region of Chile.
(Japan) Kantō region	32,429.59	Region of Japan containing the prefectures of Ibaraki, Tochigi, Gunma, Saitama, Chiba, Tōkyō and Kanagawa.
Jalal-Abad Region	32,418	Region of Kyrgyzstan.
(Tanzania) Pwani	32,407	Region of Tanzania.
Brest Region	32,300	Third smallest province of Belarus.
Minya Governorate	32,279	Governorate of Egypt.
(Zimbabwe) Mashonaland East	32,230	Second smallest province of Zimbabwe.
(Nigeria) Sokoto State	32,146	State of Nigeria.
Maryland	32,133	State of the United States.
Catalonia	32,114	Autonomous community of Spain.
(Central African Republic) Ouham-Pendé	32,100	Prefecture of the Central African Republic.
Pays de la Loire	32,082	Region of France.
(New Zealand) Southland	32,079	Second largest region of New Zealand.
(Greenland) Kujalleq	32,000	Smallest municipality of Greenland.
Dnipropetrovsk Oblast	31,974	Second largest oblast of Ukraine.
(Japan) Chūgoku region	31,921.54	Region of Japan containing the prefectures of Tottori. Shimane, Okayama, Hiroshima and Yamaguchi.
(Oman) Ad Dakhiliyah Governorate	31,900	Third largest governorate of Oman.
Chernihiv Oblast	31,865	Third largest oblast of Ukraine.
(Central African Republic) Ombella-M'Poko	31,835	Prefecture of the Central African Republic.
Hauts-de-France	31,806	Region of France.
(Angola) Benguela Province	31,788	Province of Angola.
Lake Baikal	31,500	Lake in Russia. Deepest and largest volume lake in the world.
Kharkiv Oblast	31,415	Oblast of Ukraine.
Provence-Alpes-Côte d'Azur	31,400	Region of France.
(Angola) Bengo Province	31,371	Province of Angola.
(Zambia) Copperbelt Province	31,328	Province of Zambia.
(British Columbia) Vancouver Island	31,285	Island of British Columbia, Canada
(New Zealand) Otago	31,241	Third largest region of New Zealand.
(Guinea) Boké Region	31,186	Region of Guinea.
(Morocco) Marrakech-Tensift-El Haouz	31,160	Region of Morocco.
(Ivory Coast) Woroba District	31,088	Third largest district of Côte d'Ivoire.
Great Bear Lake	31,080	Lake in Canada.
(Ivory Coast) Montagnes District	31,050	District of Côte d'Ivoire.
(South Sudan) Warap	31,027	State of South Sudan.
(Niger) Dosso Region	31,002	Department of Niger.
North Maluku	30,895	Province of Indonesia.
(Bangladesh) Dhaka Division	30,772	Third largest division of Bangladesh.
(Nigeria) Benue State	30,755	State of Nigeria.
(Tanzania) Mwanza	30,548	Region of Tanzania.
Santander Department	30,537	District of Colombia.
Belgium	30,528	Country in Europe.
(Maule Region) Maule	30,518	Region of Chile.
Guanajuato	30,491	State of Mexico.
(Sudan) White Nile	30,411	State of Sudan.
Lesotho	30,355	Country in Africa.
(Central African Republic) Mambéré-Kadéï	30,203	Prefecture of the Central African Republic.
(Tanzania) Mara	30,150	Region of Tanzania.
Lake Malawi	30,044	Lake in Africa between Malawi, Mozambique, and Tanzania.
Wa State	30,000	De facto independent state in Myanmar.
Central Province (Papua New Guinea)	29,998	Province of Papua New Guinea.
(Algeria) Naâma Province	29,950	Province of Algeria.
Normandy	29,907	Region of France.
Kaluga Oblast	29,900	Federal subject of Russia.
(Russia) New Siberian Islands	29,900	Archipelago part of Russia.
Greater Poland Voivodeship (Wielkopolskie)	29,854	Second largest Voivodeship of Poland.
Zhytomyr Oblast	29,832	Oblast of Ukraine.
Misiones	29,801	Province of Argentina.
Kursk Oblast	29,800	Federal subject of Russia.
Armenia	29,800	Country in the Caucasus region of Europe.
Galicia	29,574	Autonomous community of Spain.
Brandenburg	29,480	State of Germany.
Cauca Department	29,308	District of Colombia.
(Senegal) Louga Region	29,188	Second largest region of Senegal.
(Iran) Kurdistan Province	29,137	Province of Iran.
(Iran) Markazi Province	29,130	Province of Iran.
Pastaza Province	29,068	Largest province of Ecuador.
(Nigeria) Kogi State	29,063	State of Nigeria.
Vladimir Oblast	29,000	Federal subject of Russia.
Mogilev Region (Mahilyow Region)	29,000	Second smallest province of Belarus.
Osh Region	28,934	Region of Kyrgyzstan.
Monagas	28,930	State of Venezuela.
Great Slave Lake	28,930	Lake in Canada.
Solomon Islands	28,896	Country in Oceania.
Madang Province	28,886	Province of Papua New Guinea.
(Guinea) Kindia Region	28,873	Third smallest region of Guinea.
Poltava Oblast	28,748	Oblast of Ukraine.
Albania	28,748	Country in Europe.
Kayin State	28,726	State of Myanmar (Myanmar has certain administrative divisions titled as Divisions, and others titled as States).
(Tajikistan) Region of Republican Subordination	28,600	Second largest province of Tajikistan.
(Ivory Coast) Vallée du Bandama District	28,518	District of Côte d'Ivoire.
(Ivory Coast) Lacs District	25,800	District of Côte d'Ivoire.
(Turkey) Sivas Province	28,488	Second largest province of Turkey.
(Botswana) Southern	28,470	District of Botswana.
Kherson Oblast	28,461	Oblast of Ukraine.
(Iran) North Khorasan Province	28,434	Province of Iran.
Timor	28,418	Island divided between Indonesia and East Timor.
(Uzbekistan) Qashqadaryo Region	28,400	Region of Uzbekistan.
(Zimbabwe) Mashonaland Central	28,374	Smallest province of Zimbabwe.
Hawaii	28,311	State of the United States.
(Iran) Lorestan Province	28,294	Province of Iran.
Dalarna County	28,194	County of Sweden.
Kyiv Oblast	28,131	Oblast of Ukraine.
Equatorial Guinea	28,051	Country in Africa.
(Chad) Logone Oriental	28,035	Region of Chad.
(Nepal) Karnali Province	27,984	Province of Nepal.
Burundi	27,834	Country in Africa.
(Eritrea) Northern Red Sea region	27,800	Region in Eritrea.
Alagoas	27,768	State of Brazil.
Haiti	27,750	Country in the Caribbean.
(Eritrea) Southern Red Sea region	27,600	Region in Eritrea.
North Sinai Governorate	27,574	Governorate of Egypt.
Hedmark	27,388	County of Norway.
Massachusetts	27,336	State of the United States.
South Caribbean Coast Autonomous Region	27,260	Second largest region of Nicaragua.
Federally Administered Tribal Areas	27,220	Province of Pakistan.
Brittany	27,208	Region of France.
(Republic of the Congo) Cuvette-Ouest	27,200	Department of the Republic of the Congo. Area is approximate, as sources conflict.
Zaporizhia Oblast	27,180	Oblast of Ukraine.
Belgorod Oblast	27,100	Federal subject of Russia.
(Nigeria) Oyo State	27,036	State of Nigeria.
Nayarit	26,979	State of Mexico.
(Tanzania) Tanga	26,808	Region of Tanzania.
Luhansk Oblast	26,684	Oblast of Ukraine.
(Nigeria) Nasarawa State	26,633	State of Nigeria.
(Central African Republic) Nana-Mambéré	26,600	Prefecture of the Central African Republic.
(Namibia) Omusati	26,573	Region of Namibia.
(Jordan) Mafraq	26,551	Governorate of Jordan.
(Nigeria) Plateau State	26,539	State of Nigeria.
Donetsk Oblast	26,517	Oblast of Ukraine.
Vinnitsa Oblast	26,513	Oblast of Ukraine.
Rwanda	26,338	Country in Africa.
(Benin) Alibori Department	26,242	Largest department of Benin.
Republic of Mordovia	26,200	Federal subject of Russia.
Bosnia and Herzegovina	26,111	Political entity of Bosnia and Herzegovina.
(Autonomous Republic of Crimea) Crimea	26,081	Autonomous republic of Ukraine.
Bolívar, Colombia	25,978	District of Colombia.
(Republic of the Congo) Niari	25,940	Department of the Republic of the Congo.
Asyut Governorate	25,926	Governorate of Egypt.
(Nepal) Koshi	25,905	Province of Nepal.
(Benin) Borgou Department	25,856	Second largest department of Benin.
Troms	25,848	County of Norway.
Gambela Region	25,802	Region of Ethiopia.
(Ivory Coast) Bas-Sassandra	25,800	District of Côte d'Ivoire.
(Scotland) Highland	25,784	Largest unitary district of Scotland; largest sub-country entity of the United Kingdom.
(Mozambique) Maputo Province	25,756	Smallest non-city province of Mozambique.
Lake Erie	25,719	Lake in North America, between Canada and the United States.
North Macedonia	25,713	Country in Europe.
Kingdom of Sicily	25,708	A medieval kingdom centered on the Island of Sicily, lasting from 1282-1811/1816.
Sicily	25,708	Largest region of Italy.
(Turkey) Ankara Province	25,706	Third largest province of Turkey.
Tula Oblast	25,700	Federal subject of Russia.
(New Zealand) Waikato	25,598	Region of New Zealand.
(La Libertad Department (El Salvador)) La Libertad Region	25,500	Region of Peru.
(Tajikistan) Sughd	25,400	Province of Tajikistan.
Piedmont	25,399	Second largest region of Italy.
(Gabon) Ogooué-Lolo	25,380	Province of Gabon.
(Burkina Faso) Hauts-Bassins	25,343	Region of Burkina Faso.
(Department of Pasco) Pasco Region	25,320	Region of Peru.
Tabasco	25,267	State of Mexico.
Oppland	25,191	County of Norway.
Lublin Voivodeship (Lubelskie)	25,115	Third largest Voivodeship of Poland.
(Taiwan (Republic of China province)) Taiwan Province	25,110	Largest province of Taiwan.
(Senegal) Matam Region	25,083	Third largest region of Senegal.
(Turkey) Erzurum Province	25,066	Province of Turkey.
(Algeria) Laghouat Province	25,057	Province of Algeria.
Córdoba Department	25,020	District of Colombia.
Grodno Region (Hrodna Region)	25,000	Smallest province of Belarus.
(Iran) Kermanshah Province	24,998	Province of Iran.
Vermont	24,901	State of the United States.
Putumayo Department	24,885	District of Colombia.
Falcón	24,800	State of Venezuela.
(Tajikistan) Khatlon	24,800	Smallest province of Tajikistan.
(Canada) Somerset Island	24,786	Island in the Arctic Archipelago.
Oryol Oblast	24,700	Federal subject of Russia.
Munster	24,608	A historical province of Ireland occupying the southern quarter of the island.
Mykolaiv Oblast	24,598	Oblast of Ukraine.
Kirovohrad Oblast	24,588	Oblast of Ukraine.
(Cameroon) Southwest Province	24,571	Province of Cameroon.
Republika Srpska	24,526	Political entity of Bosnia and Herzegovina.
Ulster	24,481	A historical province of Ireland occupying the northern quarter of the island (all but three counties correspond to Northern Ireland).
(Ghana) Ashanti Region	24,390	Third largest region of Ghana.
Southern Region (Iceland)	24,256	Largest region of Iceland.
(Honduras) Olancho	24,351	Largest department of Honduras.
New Hampshire	24,216	State of the United States.
Cundinamarca Department	24,210	District of Colombia.
(Warmian–Masurian Voivodeship) Warmian-Masurian Voivodeship (Warmińsko-Mazurskie)	24,204	Voivodeship of Poland.
(Angola) Cuanza Norte Province	24,190	Province of Angola.
(Morocco) Taza-Al Hoceima-Taounate	24,155	Region of Morocco.
Lipetsk Oblast	24,100	Federal subject of Russia.
Sardinia	24,090	Third largest region of Italy.
(Russia) Kotelny Island	24,000	Island in the New Siberian Islands, part of Russia.
(Sweden) Västra Götaland County	23,945	County of Sweden.
(Ivory Coast) Sassandra-Marahoué District	23,280	District of Côte d'Ivoire.
(Ghana) Western Region	23,921	Region of Ghana.
(Ecuador) Morona-Santiago	23,875	Second largest province of Ecuador.
Lombardy	23,861	Region of Italy.
Sumy Oblast	23,834	Oblast of Ukraine.
(Nigeria) Katsina State	23,822	State of Nigeria.
Arauca Department	23,818	District of Colombia.
(Iran) Mazandaran Province	23,701	Province of Iran.
Tolima Department	23,562	District of Colombia.
Lake Winnipeg	23,553	Lake in Canada.
(Nigeria) Jigawa State	23,415	State of Nigeria.
(Sudan) Gezira	23,373	State of Sudan.
(Syria) Al-Hasakah	23,334	Third largest governorate of Syria.
(Ivory Coast) Lagunes District	23,280	District of Côte d'Ivoire.
(New Zealand) West Coast	23,276	Region of New Zealand.
Valencian Community	23,255	Autonomous community of Spain.
(Eritrea) Anseba region	23,200	Region in Eritrea.
Mari El Republic	23,200	Federal subject of Russia.
Djibouti	23,200	Country in Africa.
Boyacá Department	23,189	District of Colombia.
Magdalena Department	23,188	District of Colombia.
Mecklenburg-Vorpommern	23,174	State of Germany.
Tuscany	22,997	Region of Italy.
Belize	22,966	Country in Central America.
Central Equatoria	22,956	State of South Sudan.
(Afghanistan) Ghazni Province	22,915	Province of Afghanistan.
Cesar Department	22,905	District of Colombia.
West Pomeranian Voivodeship (Zachodniopomorskie)	22,902	Voivodeship of Poland.
(Gabon) Ogooué-Maritime	22,890	Province of Gabon.
(Guinea) Labé Region	22,869	Second smallest region of Guinea.
(Iran) Bushehr Province	22,743	Province of Iran.
Oro Province	22,735	Province of Papua New Guinea.
Eastern Region (Iceland)	22,721	Second largest region of Iceland.
(Afghanistan) Orūzgān Province	22,696	Province of Afghanistan.
Kingdom of Navarre	22,670	A Spanish Kingdom during the reconquista, lasting from 824–1620.
New Jersey	22,588	State of the United States.
Tucumán	22,524	Province of Argentina.
Meghalaya	22,429	State of India.
(Norway) Nord-Trøndelag	22,396	County of Norway.
Manipur	22,327	State of India.
(Chad) Lac	22,320	Region of Chad.
(Mauritania) Dakhlet Nouadhibou	22,300	Region of Mauritania.
(Nepal) Lumbini Province	22,288	Province of Nepal.
(Iceland) Westfjords	22,271	Third largest region of Iceland.
(New Zealand) Manawatū-Whanganui	22,206	Region of New Zealand.
(Bangladesh) Khulna Division	22,181	Division of Bangladesh.
Israel (including disputed territory)	22,145	Country in Middle East. Including the Golan Heights; excluding the West Bank and Gaza Strip.
(Sudan) Khartoum	22,142	Smallest state of Sudan.
(Valle del Cauca Department) Valle del Cauca	22,140	District of Colombia.
Huancavelica Region	22,131	Region of Peru.
Emilia-Romagna	22,124	Region of Italy.
(Nigeria) Cross River State	22,112	State of Nigeria.
Kepulauan Riau	21,992	Province of Indonesia.
Northeastern Region (Iceland)	21,968	Region of Iceland.
Sergipe	21,910	State of Brazil.
(Zambia) Lusaka Province	21,898	Smallest province of Zambia; split from Central Province in 1973, Lusaka province was initially only 360 km^{2}, but by 1988 it had been enlarged to its present size.
Lviv Oblast	21,831	Oblast of Ukraine.
Ivanovo Oblast	21,800	Federal subject of Russia.
(Laos) Savannakhet	21,774	Largest province of Laos.
(Iran) Zanjan Province	21,773	Province of Iran.
(Burkina Faso) Centre-Ouest	21,752	Region of Burkina Faso.
Västernorrland County	21,678	County of Sweden.
(Orellana Province) Orellana	21,691	Third largest province of Ecuador.
Norte de Santander Department	21,658	District of Colombia.
(Nepal) Gandaki	21,504	Province of Nepal.
Vojvodina	21,506	Province of Serbia.
México	21,355	State of Mexico.
Ica Region	21,328	Region of Peru.
(Gabon) Nyanga Province	21,285	Third smallest province of Gabon.
Tierra del Fuego	21,263	Province of Argentina. Not including claims on the Malvinas (Falkland Islands), South Georgia and South Sandwich Islands, nor Argentine Antarctica.
Bengkulu	21,168	Province of Indonesia.
(Afghanistan) Baghlan Province	21,118	Province of Afghanistan.
Hesse (Hessen)	21,115	State of Germany.
Mizoram	21,081	State of India.
El Salvador	21,041	Country in Central America.
Perak	21,006	State of Malaysia.
(Ivory Coast) Denguélé District	20,997	District of Côte d'Ivoire.
(Algeria) Biskra Province	20,986	Province of Algeria.
(Republic of the Congo) Lékoumou	20,950	Department of the Republic of the Congo.
Guayas Province	20,902	Province of Ecuador.
Cherkasy Oblast	20,900	Oblast of Ukraine.
(Peru) Apurímac Region	20,896	Region of Peru.
(La Guajira Department) Guajira Department	20,848	District of Colombia.
Hidalgo	20,813	State of Mexico.
(Uzbekistan) Surxondaryo Region	20,800	Region of Uzbekistan.
Wales	20,779	Second smallest constituent country of the United Kingdom.
Israel (excluding disputed territory)	20,770	Country in Middle East. Excluding the Golan Heights, the West Bank and Gaza Strip.
(Gabon) Estuaire Province	20,740	Second smallest province of Gabon.
(Algeria) Tiaret Province	20,673	Province of Algeria.
Khmelnytskyi Oblast	20,645	Oblast of Ukraine.
(Turkey) Antalya Province	20,591	Province of Turkey.
(Afghanistan) Badghis Province	20,591	Province of Afghanistan.
Halaib Triangle	20,580	Disputed area between Egypt and Sudan.
(Ghana) Volta Region	20,572	Region of Ghana.
(Uzbekistan) Jizzax Region	20,500	Region of Uzbekistan.
(Benin) Atakora Department	20,499	Department of Benin.
(Thailand) Nakhon Ratchasima Province	20,494	Largest province of Thailand.
Saxony-Anhalt (Sachsen-Anhalt)	20,445	State of Germany.
(Nigeria) Kano State	20,389	State of Nigeria.
West New Britain Province	20,387	Province of Papua New Guinea.
(Nepal) Bagmati	20,300	Province of Nepal.
(Afghanistan) Faryab Province	20,293	Province of Afghanistan.
Slovenia	20,273	Country in Europe.
(Cameroon) Littoral Province	20,239	Third smallest province of Cameroon.
(Iran) Golestan Province	20,195	Province of Iran.
Podlaskie Voivodeship (Podlaskie)	20,171	Voivodeship of Poland.
Volyn Oblast	20,144	Oblast of Ukraine.
(Iran) Ilam Province	20,133	Province of Iran.
(Chanthaburi province) Chanthaburi Province	20,107	Second largest province of Thailand.
Rivne Oblast	20,047	Oblast of Ukraine.
(San Pedro Department, Paraguay) San Pedro Department	20,002	Department of Paraguay.
(Brazil) Bananal Island	20,000	Island part of Brazil, world's second-largest fluvial island.
(Nepal) Sudurpashchim	19,999.28	Province of Nepal.
(Central African Republic) Nana-Grébizi	19,996	Economic prefecture of the Central African Republic.
Johor	19,984	State of Malaysia.
(Ghana) Eastern Region	19,977	Region of Ghana.
Lower Silesian Voivodeship (Dolnośląskie)	19,947	Voivodeship of Poland.
Chüy Region	19,895	Region of Kyrgyzstan.
Huila Department	19,890	District of Colombia.
Rhineland-Palatinate (Rheinland-Pfalz)	19,847	State of Germany.
Lara	19,800	State of Venezuela.
(Morocco) Fès-Boulemane	19,795	Region of Morocco.
Leinster	19,774	A historical province of Ireland occupying the southeastern quarter of the island.
West Nusa Tenggara	19,709	Province of Indonesia.
Southern Province, Sierra Leone	19,694	Second largest province of Sierra Leonne.
(Burkina Faso) Centre-Nord	19,677	Region of Burkina Faso.
(Syria) Raqqa	19,618	Governorate of Syria.
(Nigeria) Edo State	19,584	State of Nigeria.
(Kamphaeng Phet province) Kamphaeng Phet Province	19,483	Third largest province of Thailand.
(Afghanistan) Paktika Province	19,482	Province of Afghanistan.
Lake Ontario	19,477	Lake in North America, between Canada and the United States.
(Central African Republic) Sangha-Mbaéré	19,412	Economic prefecture of the Central African Republic.
(Iran) Hamedan Province	19,368	Province of Iran.
Apulia	19,362	Region of Italy.
(Central African Republic) Lobaye	19,235	Third smallest prefecture of the Central African Republic.
Lower Austria	19,178	Largest state of Austria.
(Greece) Central Macedonia	19,147	Largest region of Greece.
(Turkey) Van Province	19,069	Province of Turkey.
(Senegal) Saint-Louis Region	19,044	Region of Senegal.
North Gyeongsang Province	19,024	Largest province of South Korea.
Agin-Buryat Autonomous Okrug	19,000	Federal subject of Russia. (also included in Zabaykalsky Territory total)
(Norway) Sør-Trøndelag	18,832	County of Norway.
(Iran) Tehran Province	18,814	Province of Iran.
(Japan) Shikoku	18,800	Island of Japan, region containing the prefectures of Tokushima, Kagawa, Ehime and Kōchi.
Bangka Belitung Islands	18,725	Province of Indonesia.
(Algeria) M'Sila Province	18,718	Province of Algeria.
Sogn og Fjordane	18,619	County of Norway.
(Sucumbíos Province) Sucumbíos	18,612	Province of Ecuador.
(Turkey) Şanlıurfa Province	18,584	Province of Turkey.
New Caledonia	18,575	French dependency.
(North Korea) South Hamgyŏng Province	18,558	Largest province of North Korea.
(Gabon) Moyen-Ogooué	18,535	Smallest province of Gabon.
(Syria) Aleppo	18,498	Governorate of Syria.
(Ghana) Upper West Region	18,477	Region of Ghana.
(Los Ríos Region) Los Ríos	18,430	Region of Chile.
Lake Balkhash	18,428	Lake in Kazakhstan.
(Burkina Faso) Cascades	18,424	Region of Burkina Faso.
Saxony (Sachsen)	18,416	State of Germany.
Manabí Province	18,400	Province of Ecuador.
Veneto	18,391	Region of Italy.
Chuvash Republic	18,300	Federal subject of Russia.
Pomeranian Voivodeship (Pomorskie)	18,293	Voivodeship of Poland.
Fiji	18,274	Country in Oceania.
Łódź Voivodeship (Łódzkie)	18,219	Voivodeship of Poland.
Gävleborg County	18,191	County of Sweden.
Gauteng	18,178	Smallest province of South Africa.
(Russia) Lake Ladoga	18,130	Lake in Russia.
(Concepción Department, Paraguay) Concepción Department	18,051	Department of Paraguay.
(Chad) Tandjilé	18,045	Region of Chad.
(Indonesia) Halmahera	18,040	Island part of Indonesia.
(Syria) Rif Dimashq	18,018	Governorate of Syria.
(Kuyavian–Pomeranian Voivodeship) Kuyavian-Pomeranian Voivodeship (Kujawsko-Pomorskie)	17,970	Voivodeship of Poland.
Subcarpathian Voivodeship (Podkarpackie)	17,926	Voivodeship of Poland.
Suez Governorate	17,840	Governorate of Egypt.
Kuwait	17,818	Country in Middle East.
(Cameroon) Northwest Province	17,812	Second smallest province of Cameroon.
(Iran) Ardabil Province	17,800	Province of Iran.
Connacht	17,713	A historical province of Ireland occupying the northwestern quarter of the island.
Aleutian Islands	17,670	Chain of islands divided between Russia and the U.S. state of Alaska
(Central African Republic) Basse-Kotto	17,604	Second smallest prefecture of the Central African Republic.
Värmland County	17,583	County of Sweden.
(Ivory Coast) Gôh-Djiboua District	17,580	District of Côte d'Ivoire.
(Indonesia) Seram Island	17,454	Island part of Indonesia.
(Yemen) Ma'rib Governorate	17,450	Governorate of Yemen.
(Nigeria) Gombe State	17,428	State of Nigeria.
Eswatini	17,364	Country in Africa.
(Afghanistan) Zabul Province	17,343	Province of Afghanistan.
(Afghanistan) Balkh Province	17,249	Province of Afghanistan.
Lazio	17,207	Region of Italy.
(Central African Republic) Kémo	17,204	Smallest prefecture of the Central African Republic.
Aral Sea	17,160	Lake in Central Asia, between Kazakhstan and Uzbekistan.
(Morocco) Tadla-Azilal	17,125	Region of Morocco.
(Nigeria) Delta State	17,095	State of Nigeria.
(Guinea) Mamou Region	17,074	Smallest region of Guinea.
Batken Region	17,048	Region of Kyrgyzstan.
Palawan	17,030.75	Largest province of the Philippines; includes the independent city of Puerto Princesa.
Republic of Serbian Krajina	17,028	Former unrecognized state in Europe.
(Togo) Plateaux	16,975	Largest region of Togo.
(Turkey) Kayseri Province	16,917	Province of Turkey.
(Senegal) Kédougou Region	16,896	Region of Senegal.
(Laos) Louangphabang	16,875	Second largest province of Laos.
(Arica y Parinacota Region) Arica and Parinacota	16,873	Region of Chile.
(Nigeria) Ogun State	16,850	State of Nigeria.
Wallonia	16,844	Region of Belgium.
West Sulawesi	16,796	Province of Indonesia.
(Tanzania) Mtwara	16,707	Region of Tanzania.
New Caledonia Grande Terre	16,648	Biggest island of New Caledonia.
(Honduras) Gracias a Dios	16,630	Second largest department of Honduras.
Pichincha Province	16,599	Province of Ecuador.
Nagaland	16,579	State of India.
(Itapúa Department) Itapúa	16,525	Department of Paraguay.
(Gangwon Province, South Korea) Gangwon Province	16,502	Second largest province of South Korea.
(Laos) Houaphan	16,500	Third largest province of Laos.
(Vietnam) Nghệ An Province	16,498.50	Largest province of Vietnam.
(Yemen) Abyan Governorate	16,450	Governorate of Yemen.
(Burkina Faso) Nord	16,414	Region of Burkina Faso.
Beijing	16,411	Capital of China, direct-controlled municipality.
(Tak province) Tak Province	16,407	Province of Thailand.
(Uzbekistan) Samarqand Region	16,400	Region of Uzbekistan.
Styria	16,392	Second largest state of Austria.
(Laos) Xaignabouli	16,389	Province of Laos.
(Valparaíso Region) Valparaíso	16,378	Region of Chile.
(Iran) Chahar Mahaal and Bakhtiari Province	16,332	Province of Iran.
(Laos) Khammouan	16,315	Province of Laos.
(Laos) Phongsali	16,270	Province of Laos.
Thuringia (Thüringen)	16,172	State of Germany.
(Kenya) Nyanza Province	16,162	Second smallest province of Kenya.
(Burkina Faso) Sud-Ouest	16,153	Region of Burkina Faso.
(Russia) Franz Josef Land	16,134	Archipelago part of Russia.
(North Korea) Chagang Province	16,076	Second largest province of North Korea.
(Department of Tacna) Tacna Region	16,076	Region of Peru.
(Canada) Bathurst Island	16,042	Island in the Arctic Archipelago.
Tonlé Sap	16,000	Lake in Cambodia, at the height of the monsoon season.
(Afghanistan) Sar-e Pol Province	15,999	Province of Afghanistan.
(O'Higgins Region) O'Higgins	15,950	Region of Chile.
(Laos) Vientiane Prefecture	15,927	Province of Laos.
(Laos) Xiangkhoang	15,880	Province of Laos.
(Turkey) Mersin province	15,853	Province of Turkey.
(Canada) Prince Patrick Island	15,848	Island in the Arctic Archipelago.
(Santiago Metropolitan Region) Región Metropolitana de Santiago	15,782	Smallest region of Chile.
Schleswig-Holstein	15,763	State of Germany.
(Ubon Ratchathani province) Ubon Ratchathani Province	15,745	Province of Thailand.
(Department of Moquegua) Moquegua Region	15,734	Region of Peru.
East New Britain Province	15,724	Province of Papua New Guinea.
Thurston Island	15,700	Island part of Antarctica.
Lake Vostok	15,690	Lake in Antarctica.
Hordaland	15,634	County of Norway.
Eastern Province, Sierra Leone	15,553	Smallest province of Sierra Leonne; second smallest first level subdivision.
Central Greece	15,549	Second largest region of Greece.
(Iran) Qazvin Province	15,549	Province of Iran.
(Vietnam) Gia Lai Province	15,536.90	Second largest province of Vietnam.
(Iran) Kohgiluyeh and Boyer-Ahmad Province	15,504	Province of Iran.
(Greece) Peloponnese	15,490	Third largest region of Greece.
Tacuarembó Department	15,438	Largest department of Uruguay.
(Laos) Champasak	15,415	Province of Laos.
(Laos) Oudomxai	15,370	Province of Laos.
North Sulawesi	15,364	Province of Indonesia.
(Turkey) Diyarbakır Province	15,355	Province of Turkey.
Telemark	15,313	County of Norway.
Chechen Republic	15,300	Federal subject of Russia. (the exact area is unknown as the border of Chechnya with Ingushetia has not been demarcated).
(Uzbekistan) Tashkent Region	15,300	Region of Uzbekistan.
Iwate	15,275.01	Second largest prefecture of Japan.
Esmeraldas Province	15,216	Province of Ecuador.
Portuguesa	15,200	State of Venezuela.
Lesser Poland Voivodeship (Małopolskie)	15,144	Voivodeship of Poland.
Møre og Romsdal	15,104	County of Norway.
Kaliningrad Oblast	15,100	Federal subject of Russia.
Southern Highlands Province	15,089	Province of Papua New Guinea.
Calabria	15,080	Region of Italy.
(Nigeria) Ondo State	15,019	State of Nigeria.
(Saudi Arabia) Al Bahah Province	15,000	Province of Saudi Arabia.
Buskerud	14,927	County of Norway.
Kelantan	14,922	State of Malaysia.
Alto Paraná	14,895	Department of Paraguay.
East Timor	14,874	Country in Southeast Asia.
(Laos) Bolikhamxai	14,863	Province of Laos.
Cojedes	14,800	State of Venezuela.
(Burkina Faso) Centre-Est	14,710	Region of Burkina Faso.
(Canindeyú Department) Canindeyú	14,667	Department of Paraguay.
Milne Bay Province	14,345	Province of Papua New Guinea.
(Namibia) Caprivi Region	14,528	Region of Namibia.
(Svalbard) Nordaustlandet	14,467	Island part of Svalbard, Norway.
(Indonesia) Sumbawa	14,386	Island part of Indonesia.
Lesser Antilles	14,364	Third major island chain in the Caribbean.
Connecticut	14,357	State of the United States.
(Turkey) Kahramanmaraş Province	14,327	Province of Turkey.
Lucayan Archipelago	14,308	One of three island chains in the Caribbean, consisting of the Bahamas and Turks and Caicos Islands.
(Turkey) Balıkesir Province	14,292	Province of Turkey.
(Cambodia) Mondulkiri Province	14,288	Largest province of Cambodia.
(Department of Lambayeque) Lambayeque Region	14,231	Region of Peru.
(Turkey) Afyonkarahisar Province	14,230	Province of Turkey.
(Algeria) Tébessa Province	14,227	Province of Algeria.
(Russia) October Revolution Island	14,204	Island in the Zevernaya Zemlya archipelago, part of Russia.
(Afghanistan) Bamiyan Province	14,175	Province of Afghanistan.
(Vietnam) Sơn La Province	14,174.40	Third largest province of Vietnam.
(Ivory Coast) Comoé District	14,173	District of Côte d'Ivoire.
Salto Department	14,163	Second largest department of Uruguay.
(Greece) East Macedonia and Thrace	14,157	Region of Greece.
(Indonesia) Flores	14,154	Island part of Indonesia.
(Ivory Coast) Moyen-Cavally	14,150	Region of Côte d'Ivoire.
Northern Ireland	14,139	Smallest constituent country of the United Kingdom.
(Cuba) Camagüey Province	14,134	Largest province of Cuba.
(Turkey) Yozgat Province	14,123	Province of Turkey.
(New Zealand) Hawke's Bay	14,111	Region of New Zealand.
(Israel) Southern District	14,107	Largest District of Israel.
Karachay–Cherkess Republic	14,100	Federal subject of Russia.
(Iran) Gilan Province	14,042	Province of Iran.
Thessaly	14,037	Region of Greece.
Lubusz Voivodeship (Lubuskie)	13,984	Voivodeship of Poland.
(Benin) Collines Department	13,931	Department of Benin.
Ivano-Frankivsk Oblast	13,928	Oblast of Ukraine.
Paysandú Department	13,922	Third largest department of Uruguay.
(North Korea) Ryanggang Province	13,888	Third largest province of North Korea.
The Bahamas	13,878	Country in the Caribbean.
(Cameroon) West Province	13,872	Smallest province of Cameroon.
(Yemen) Sana'a Governorate	13,850	Governorate of Yemen. Possibly divided in 2004, with territory going to a new governorate of unspecified area, Raymah Governorate.
Ternopil Oblast	13,823	Oblast of Ukraine.
(Cambodia) Kampong Thom	13,814	Second largest province of Cambodia.
Montenegro	13,812	Country in Europe.
(Turkey) Manisa Province	13,810	Province of Turkey.
Puerto Rico	13,790	Territory of the United States.
(New Zealand) Northland	13,789	Region of New Zealand.
(Cambodia) Preah Vihear Province	13,788	Third largest province of Cambodia.
Fukushima	13,783.74	Third largest prefecture of Japan.
(Isabela (province)) Isabela	13,778.76	Second largest province of the Philippines; includes the independent city of Santiago.
(Senegal) Kolda Region	13,718	Region of Senegal.
(Turkey) Eskişehir Province	13,652	Province of Turkey.
Cerro Largo Department	13,648	Department of Uruguay.
(Republic of the Congo) Kouilou	13,644	Department of the Republic of the Congo.
Trentino-Alto Adige/Südtirol	13,607	Region of Italy.
(Mauritania) Gorgol	13,600	Region of Mauritania.
Campania	13,595	Region of Italy.
(Flanders) Flemish Region	13,522	Region of Belgium.
Greater Tokyo Area	13,452	A metropolitan area in Japan, compromising the Kantō region.
Talas Region	13,406	Third smallest region of Kyrgyzstan.
(Turkey) Muğla province	13,338	Province of Turkey.
Naga	13,329	Self-administered zone in Myanmar.
(Togo) Centrale	13,317	Second largest region of Togo.
(Tanzania) Kilimanjaro	13,309	Region of Tanzania.
Lake Maracaibo	13,300	Lake in Venezuela
(Morocco) Doukkala-Abda	13,285	Region of Morocco.
(Yemen) Al Hudaydah Governorate	13,250	Governorate of Yemen. Possibly divided in 2004, with territory going to a new governorate of unspecified area, Raymah Governorate.
(Kenya) Central Province	13,191	Third smallest Province of Kenya.
(Vietnam) Đắk Lắk Province	13,139.20	Province of Vietnam.
(Canada) King William Island	13,111	Island in the Arctic Archipelago.
(Turkey) Kastamonu Province	13,108	Province of Turkey.
Nagano	13,104.29	Prefecture of Japan.
Central Denmark Region	13,095.80	Largest region of Denmark.
(Philippines) Negros	13,075	Third-largest island part of the Philippines.
Terengganu	12,955	State of Malaysia.
(Amambay Department) Amambay	12,933	Department of Paraguay.
(Surat Thani province) Surat Thani Province	12,892	Province of Thailand.
(Philippines) Samar	12,849	Island part of the Philippines.
(Turkey) Çorum Province	12,820	Province of Turkey.
(Turkey) Adana Province	12,788	Province of Turkey.
(Chai Nat province) Chainat Province	12,778	Province of Thailand.
Zakarpattia Oblast	12,777	Oblast of Ukraine.
Northwestern Region (Iceland)	12,737	Region of Iceland.
(Bangladesh) Sylhet Division	12,718	Second smallest division of Bangladesh.
(Cambodia) Pursat Province	12,692	Province of Cambodia.
(Lopburi province) Lopburi Province	12,681	Province of Thailand.
(Phayao province) Phayao Province	12,668	Province of Thailand.
(Yemen) Lahij Governorate	12,650	Governorate of Yemen.
(Tyrol (federal state)) Tyrol	12,648	Third largest state of Austria.
Niigata	12,584.10	Prefecture of Japan.
(North Korea) North P'yŏngan Province	12,575	Province of North Korea.
(Krabi province) Krabi Province	12,534	Province of Thailand.
Kabardino-Balkar Republic	12,500	Federal subject of Russia.
(Oman) Al Batinah Region	12,500	Second largest region of Oman.
(New Zealand) Marlborough	12,484	Unitary authority of New Zealand.
Napo Province	12,426	Province of Ecuador.
(Yemen) Sa'dah Governorate	12,370	Governorate of Yemen.
(Afghanistan) Takhar Province	12,333	Province of Afghanistan.
(Turkey) Malatya Province	12,313	Province of Turkey.
Silesian Voivodeship (Śląskie)	12,294	Third smallest Voivodeship of Poland.
(Republic of the Congo) Bouenza	12,266	Third smallest department of the Republic of the Congo.
(New Zealand) Bay of Plenty	12,231	Region of New Zealand.
Gorontalo	12,215	Province of Indonesia.
(Algeria) Batna Province	12,192	Province of Algeria.
(Philippines) Palawan	12,189	Island part of the Philippines.
Vanuatu	12,189	Country in Oceania.
(North Korea) North Hamgyŏng Province	12,189	Province of North Korea.
Falkland Islands	12,173	British Overseas Territory in the South Atlantic Ocean (near South America). Claimed by Argentina. Excludes South Georgia and the South Sandwich Islands.
(Paraguay) Ñeembucú	12,147	Department of Paraguay.
Region of Southern Denmark	12,132.21	Region of Denmark.
Lanao del Sur	12,051.85	Third largest province of the Philippines.
Île-de-France	12,012	Second smallest region of Metropolitan France.
(Philippines) Panay	12,011	Island part of the Philippines.
South Jeolla Province	11,987	Third largest province of South Korea.
Upper Austria	11,982	State of Austria.
(Turkey) İzmir Province	11,973	Province of Turkey.
Artigas Department	11,928	Department of Uruguay.
(China) Tianjin	11,917	Direct-controlled municipality of China.
(Turkey) Erzincan Province	11,903	Province of Turkey.
(Turkey) Kütahya Province	11,875	Province of Turkey.
(Turkey) Denizli Province	11,868	Province of Turkey.
(Senegal) Kaffrine Region	11,853	Region of Senegal.
Mon State	11,831	State of Myanmar (Myanmar has certain administrative divisions titled as Divisions, and others titled as States).
Sucre	11,800	State of Venezuela.
(Afghanistan) Jowzjan Province	11,798	Province of Afghanistan.
(Indonesia) Yos Sudarso Island	11,742	Island part of Indonesia.
(Togo) Kara	11,738	Region of Togo.
Udon Thani Province	11,730	Province of Thailand.
Enga Province	11,704	Province of Papua New Guinea.
(Chiang Mai province) Chiang Mai Province	11,678	Province of Thailand.
(Saudi Arabia) Jizan Province	11,671	Smallest province of Saudi Arabia.
Świętokrzyskie Voivodeship (Świętokrzyskie)	11,671	Second smallest Voivodeship of Poland.
Kayah State	11,670	Smallest state of Myanmar, second largest administrative entity (Myanmar has certain administrative divisions titled as Divisions, and others titled as States).
(Cuba) Matanzas Province	11,669	Second largest province of Cuba.
Durazno Department	11,643	Department of Uruguay.
(Pakistan) Azad Kashmir	11,639	Province of Pakistan.
Akita	11,637.54	Prefecture of Japan.
(North Korea) South P'yŏngan Province	11,577	Province of North Korea.
(Morocco) Tangier-Tétouan	11,570	Region of Morocco.
Nimba	11,551	Largest county of Liberia.
(Iran) Qom Province	11,526	Smallest province of Iran.
Caaguazú Department	11,474	Department of Paraguay.
(Nakhon Si Thammarat province) Nakhon Si Thammarat Province	11,472	Province of Thailand.
Nagorno-Karabakh	11,458	Independent non-sovereign republic in Azerbaijan.
(Burkina Faso) Centre-Sud	11,457	Region of Burkina Faso.
Querétaro	11,449	State of Mexico.
(Lamphun province) Lamphun Province	11,425	Province of Thailand.
(Indonesia) Bangka Island	11,413	Island part of Indonesia.
(Bangladesh) Barisal Division	11,394	Smallest division of Bangladesh.
(Turkey) Ağrı Province	11,376	Province of Turkey.
West Greece	11,350	region of Greece.
Murcia	11,313	Autonomous community of Spain.
(Georgia (country)) Kakheti	11,311	Largest region of Georgia.
Mérida	11,300	State of Venezuela.
(Canada) Ellef Ringnes Island	11,295	Island part of the Arctic Archipelago.
The Gambia	11,295	Country in Africa.
Puntarenas Province	11,266	Largest province of Costa Rica.
(Afghanistan) Samangan Province	11,262	Province of Afghanistan.
(Kuwait) Jahra	11,230	Governorate of Kuwait.
(Russia) Bolshevik Island	11,206	Island part of the Severnaya Zemlya archipelago, part of Russia.
Kalmar County	11,171	County of Sweden.
(Cambodia) Koh Kong Province	11,160	Province of Cambodia.
(Eastern Highlands (Papua New Guinea)) Eastern Highlands Province	11,157	Province of Papua New Guinea.
(Vietnam) Thanh Hóa Province	11,136.30	Province of Vietnam.
(Benin) Donga Department	11,126	Department of Benin.
Táchira	11,100	State of Venezuela.
(Cambodia) Kratie Province	11,094	Province of Cambodia.
(Cambodia) Stung Treng Province	11,092	Province of Cambodia.
Darien Province	11,091	Largest province of Panama.
(Cambodia) Battambang Province	11,072	Province of Cambodia.
(Canada) Bylot Island	11,067	Island part of the Arctic Archipelago.
Skåne County	11,027	County of Sweden.
Central Bohemian Region	11,014.97	Largest region of the Czech Republic.
Qatar	11,000	Country in Middle East.
Jamaica	10,991	Country in the Caribbean.
(Turkey) Bursa Province	10,963	Province of Turkey.
Sucre Department	10,917	District of Colombia.
Kosovo	10,887	Region in Europe; recognized by some countries as an independent country.
(Kanchanaburi province) Kanchanaburi Province	10,886	Province of Thailand.
(Cuba) Pinar del Río Province	10,860	Third largest province of Cuba.
(Phichit province) Phichit Province	10,816	Province of Thailand.
Abruzzo	10,794	Region of Italy.
Loja Province	10,792	Province of Ecuador.
(Cambodia) Ratanakiri Province	10,782	Province of Cambodia.
(Indonesia) Sumba	10,711	Island part of Indonesia.
(Namibia) Ohangwena Region	10,703	Region of Namibia.
(Laos) Salavan	10,691	Province of Laos.
Veraguas Province	10,677	Second largest province of Panama.
(Ivory Coast) Sud-Bandama	10,650	Region of Côte d'Ivoire.
Asturias	10,604	Autonomous community of Spain.
(North Korea) Kangwŏn Province	10,600	Third smallest province of North Korea.
Gifu	10,621.29	Prefecture of Japan.
(Philippines) Mindoro	10,572	Island part of the Philippines.
Östergötland County	10,562	County of Sweden.
(Zamora-Chinchipe Province) Zamora-Chinchipe	10,556	Province of Ecuador.
Rocha Department	10,551	Department of Uruguay.
Abyei	10,546	Area on the border between Sudan and South Sudan with "special administrative status".
(Fiji) Viti Levu	10,531	Largest island of Fiji.
South Gyeongsang Province	10,516	Province of South Korea.
(Russia) Kuril Islands	10,503.2	Archipelago part of Russia.
Bukidnon	10,498.59	Province of the Philippines.
Hela Province	10,498	Province of Papua New Guinea.
Tripura	10,492	State of India.
Grand Gedeh	10,484	Second largest county of Liberia.
Jönköping County	10,475	County of Sweden.
(Malawi) Mzimba	10,473	District of Malawi.
North Central	10,472	Province of Sri Lanka.
Lebanon	10,452	Country in Middle East.
(Vietnam) Quảng Nam Province	10,438.30	Province of Vietnam.
(Hawaii) Hawai'i (Big Island)	10,432	Island part of the U.S. state of Hawaii.
Florida Department	10,417	Department of Uruguay.
Navarre	10,391	Autonomous community of Spain.
(Nigeria) Rivers State	10,361	State of Nigeria.
Bangkok	10,323	Province of Thailand.
(Laos) Attapu	10,320	Province of Laos.
(Canada) Cape Breton Island	10,311	Island part of Canada.
(Mauritania) Guidimaka	10,300	Region of Mauritania.
(Cambodia) Siem Reap Province	10,299	Province of Cambodia.
(Portugal) Beja	10,225	District of Portugal.
(Canada) Haida Gwaii	10,180	Archipelago part of Canada.
(Syria) Hama	10,163	Governorate of Syria.
Guanacaste Province	10,141	Second largest province of Costa Rica.
Sinoe	10,137	Third largest county of Liberia.
Gyeonggi Province	10,135	Province of South Korea.
Beheira Governorate	10,130	Governorate of Egypt.
South Bohemian Region	10,056.79	Second largest region of the Czech Republic.
(Turkey) Bolu Province	10,037	Province of Turkey.
Lavalleja Department	10,016	Department of Uruguay.
(Yemen) Ta'izz Governorate	10,010	Governorate of Yemen.
Gironde	10,000	Largest continental department of France; second largest department of France.
Tonlé Sap	10,000	Lake in Cambodia.
Eastern	9,996	Province of Sri Lanka.
Basilicata	9,992	Region of Italy.
Agusan del Sur	9,989.52	Province of the Philippines.
Lofa	9,982	County of Liberia.
Kinshasa	9,965	Province of the Democratic Republic of the Congo.
(Turkey) Tokat Province	9,958	Province of Turkey.
Nakhon Sawan Province	9,943	Province of Thailand.
(Equatorial Guinea) Centro Sur	9,931	Province of Equatorial Guinea.
(Russia) Lake Onega	9,891	Lake in Russia.
(Ghana) Central Region	9,826	Third smallest region of Ghana.
(Algeria) Khenchela Province	9,811	Province of Algeria.
(Cambodia) Kampong Cham Province	9,799	Province of Cambodia.
(Vietnam) Lâm Đồng Province	9,776.10	Province of Vietnam.
(New Zealand) Tasman	9,771	Unitary authority of New Zealand.
Alajuela Province	9,754	Third largest province of Costa Rica.
(Turkey) Çanakkale Province	9,737	Province of Turkey.
Vilnius County	9,729	County of Lithuania.
Marche	9,694	Region of Italy.
(Vietnam) Kon Tum Province	9,690.50	Province of Vietnam.
Gbarpolu	9,689	County of Liberia.
Treinta y Tres Department	9,676	Department of Uruguay.
(Nepal) Madhesh	9,661	Province of Nepal.
Aomori	9,645.59	Prefecture of Japan.
(Panama) Panamá	9,633	Third largest province of Panama.
(Sakon Nakhon province) Sakon Nakhon Province	9,606	Province of Thailand.
(Thailand) Nakhon Ratchasima Province	9,598	Province of Thailand.
(Morocco) Rabat-Salé-Zemmour-Zaer	9,580	Region of Morocco.
(Turkey) Samsun Province	9,579	Province of Turkey.
(Vietnam) Điện Biên Province	9,562.50	Province of Vietnam.
New Ireland Province	9,557	Province of Papua New Guinea.
Misiones Department	9,556	Department of Paraguay.
Western Region (Iceland)	9,554	Third smallest region of Iceland.
(Democratic Republic of the Congo) Kasai-Oriental	9,545	Province of the Democratic Republic of the Congo.
Carinthia	9,536	State of Austria.
(Canada) Prince Charles Island	9,521	Island in the Arctic Archipelago.
Caazapá Department	9,496	Department of Paraguay.
(Rwanda) Eastern Province	9,458	Province of Rwanda.
(Greece) West Macedonia	9,451	Region of Greece.
(Turkey) Kars Province	9,442	Province of Turkey.
Kedah	9,426	State of Malaysia.
Opole Voivodeship (Opolskie)	9,412	Smallest Voivodeship of Poland.
Autonomous Region of Bougainville	9,384	Autonomous region of Papua New Guinea.
(Algeria) Mila Province	9,375	Province of Algeria.
Rivera Department	9,370	Department of Uruguay.
Bayelsa State	9,363	State of Nigeria.
Rogaland	9,326	County of Norway.
(Laos) Louang Namtha	9,325	Province of Laos.
Yamagata	9,323.15	Prefecture of Japan.
(Papua New Guinea) Bougainville Island	9,318	Largest island of the autonomous region of Bougainville, part of Papua New Guinea.
(Alaska) Kodiak Island	9,310	Island part of the U.S. state of Alaska.
Cagayan	9,295.75	Province of the Philippines.
Río Negro Department	9,282	Department of Uruguay.
(Yemen) Al Bayda' Governorate	9,270	Governorate of Yemen.
Cyprus	9,251	Country in Europe. Includes Turkish Republic of Northern Cyprus (only recognised by Turkey) and British sovereign military bases (Akrotiri and Dhekelia).
Landes	9,243	Second largest continental department of France; third largest department of France.
(Afghanistan) Nurestan Province	9,225	Province of Afghanistan.
(Nicaragua) Jinotega	9,222	Third largest region of Nicaragua.
Aust-Agder	9,212	County of Norway.
(Greece) Epirus	9,203	Region of Greece.
Limón Province	9,189	Province of Costa Rica.
Kagoshima	9,186.94	Prefecture of Japan.
(Turkey) Karaman Province	9,163	Province of Turkey.
Banten	9,161	Province of Indonesia.
(Turkey) Elazığ Province	9,153	Province of Turkey.
(Guinea-Bissau) Gabú	9,150	Region of Guinea-Bissau.
(Algeria) Sidi Bel Abbès Province	9,150	Province of Algeria.
(Vietnam) Lai Châu Province	9,112.30	Province of Vietnam.
(Cuba) Holguín Province	9,105	Province of Cuba.
Puerto Rico	9,104	Commonwealth of the United States.
Puerto Rico (main island)	9,100	Main island of the U.S. territory of Puerto Rico.
(Algeria) Tlemcen Province	9,061	Province of Algeria.
Dordogne	9,060	Department of France.
(Izabal Department) Izabal	9,038	Second largest department of Guatemala.
Cotabato	9,008.90	Province of the Philippines.
Soriano Department	9,008	Department of Uruguay.
(United States) Pine Ridge Indian Reservation	8,984	Reservation in the United States.
(Afghanistan) Wardak Province	8,938	Province of Afghanistan.
(Turkey) Isparta Province	8,933	Province of Turkey.
Quezon	8,926.01	Province of the Philippines; includes the independent city of Lucena.
(Turkey) Mardin Province	8,891	Province of Turkey.
Northern	8,884	Province of Sri Lanka.
(Honduras) Colón	8,875	Third largest department of Honduras.
(Algeria) Médéa Province	8,866	Province of Algeria.
(Ghana) Upper East Region	8,842	Second smallest region of Ghana.
(Sisaket province) Sisaket Province	8,840	Province of Thailand.
Polynesia	8,830	An island chain subdivision of Oceania, excluding Hawaii.
(Russia) Komsomolets Island	8,812	Island in the Zevernaya Zemlya archipelago, part of Russia.
(Morocco) Gharb-Chrarda-Béni Hssen	8,805	Third smallest region of Morocco.
Bong	8,772	County of Liberia.
Côte-d'Or	8,763	Department of France.
Aveyron	8,735	Department of France.
Leeward Islands	8,713.5	Subsection of islands in the Lesser Antilles
Paraguarí Department	8,705	Department of Paraguay.
(Romania) Timiș County	8,697	Largest county of Romania.
(Chad) Logone Occidental	8,695	Region of Chad.
(Alta Verapaz Department) Alta Verapaz	8,686	Third largest department of Guatemala.
Corsica	8,680	Island in the Mediterranean Sea and smallest region of Metropolitan France.
(Namibia) Oshana	8,653	Smallest region of Namibia.
(Greenland) Disko Island	8,612	Island part of Greenland.
(Kalasin province) Kalasin Province	8,608	Province of Thailand.
South Chungcheong Province	8,586	Third smallest province of South Korea.
Osun	8,585	State of Nigeria.
Saône-et-Loire	8,575	Department of France.
(Romania) Suceava County	8,553	Second largest county of Romania.
(Burkina Faso) Plateau-Central	8,545	Region of Burkina Faso.
Örebro County	8,519	County of Sweden.
(Romania) Caraș-Severin County	8,514	Third largest county of Romania.
Carney Island	8,500	Island part of Antarctica.
Uva	8,500	Province of Sri Lanka.
(Romania) Tulcea County	8,499	County of Romania.
Hiroshima	8,479.45	Prefecture of Japan.
(Chile) Chiloé Island	8,478	Island part of Chile.
Indonesia Buru	8,473	Island part of Indonesia.
(Togo) Savanes	8,470	Second smallest region of Togo.
Kronoberg County	8,458	County of Sweden.
Umbria	8,456	Region of Italy.
(Cuba) Granma Province	8,452	Province of Cuba.
Šiauliai County	8,540	County of Lithuania.
(Bács-Kiskun County) Bács-Kiskun	8,445	Largest county of Hungary.
Abkhazia	8,432	Autonomous republic of Georgia.
Hyōgo	8,400.96	Prefecture of Japan.
Pa'O	8,386	Self-administered zone in Myanmar.
(Guatemala) El Quiché	8,378	Department of Guatemala.
(Kenya) Western Province	8,361	Second smallest Province of Kenya.
(New Zealand) Gisborne (or East Coast)	8,355	Unitary authority of New Zealand.
(Greece) Crete	8,336	Region of Greece.
(Vietnam) Lạng Sơn Province	8,331.20	Province of Vietnam.
(Yemen) Hajjah Governorate	8,300	Governorate of Yemen.
(Roi Et province) Roi Et Province	8,299	Province of Thailand.
(North Korea) South Hwanghae Province	8,294	Second smallest province of North Korea.
Andaman and Nicobar Islands	8,249	Union Territory of India.
(Turkey) Muş Province	8,196	Province of Turkey.
Marne	8,162	Department of France.
(North Korea) North Hwanghae Province	8,154	Smallest province of North Korea.
(New Zealand) Wellington	8,140	Region of New Zealand.
Lake Titicaca	8,135	Lake in South America between Bolivia and Peru.
(Turkey) Bingöl Province	8,125	Province of Turkey.
(Surin province) Surin Province	8,124	Province of Thailand.
Kaunas County	8,089	County of Lithuania.
(Afghanistan) Daykundi Province	8,088	Province of Afghanistan.
(Cuba) Villa Clara Province	8,069	Province of Cuba.
(Vietnam) Quảng Bình Province	8,065.30	Province of Vietnam.
North Jeolla Province	8,050	Second smallest province of South Korea.
(Afghanistan) Kunduz Province	8,040	Province of Afghanistan.
North Yorkshire	8,038	Largest administrative county of England.
Madrid	8,028	Autonomous community of Spain.
(Malawi) Kasungu	8,017	District of Malawi.
Galápagos Province	8,010	Province of Ecuador.
(Turkey) Aydın Province	8,007	Province of Turkey.
Lake Nicaragua	8,001	Lake in Nicaragua.
Republic of North Ossetia–Alania	8,000	Federal subject of Russia.
(Eritrea) Southern region	8,000	Region in Eritrea.
Puy-de-Dôme	7,970	Department of France.
Negros Occidental	7,965.21	Province of the Philippines; includes the independent city of Bacolod.
(Botswana) Kgatleng District	7,960	Third smallest district of Botswana.
Selangor	7,956	State of Malaysia.
Miranda	7,950	State of Venezuela.
(Honduras) Francisco Morazán	7,946	Department of Honduras.
(Vietnam) Hà Giang Province	7,945.80	Province of Vietnam.
(Canada) Anticosti Island	7,941	Island part of Canada.
(Honduras) Yoro	7,939	Department of Honduras.
Grand Bassa	7,936	County of Liberia.
(Senegal) Fatick Region	7,935	Region of Senegal.
Lake Athabasca	7,920	Lake in Canada.
Roosevelt Island	7,910	Island part of Antarctica.
(North Denmark Region) North Jutland Region	7,907.09	Region of Denmark.
(Uzbekistan) Namangan Region	7,900	Region of Uzbekistan.
(Yemen) 'Amran Governorate	7,900	Governorate of Yemen.
Iloilo	7,899.35	Province of the Philippines; includes the independent city of Iloilo.
Caldas Department	7,888	District of Colombia.
North Western	7,888	Province of Sri Lanka.
(Georgia (country)) Shida Kartli	7,882	Second largest region of Georgia.
Panevėžys County	7,881	County of Lithuania.
(Russia) Wrangel Island	7,866	Island part of Russia.
Friuli-Venezia Giulia	7,855	Region of Italy.
(Uttaradit province) Uttaradit Province	7,839	Province of Thailand.
(Vietnam) Bình Thuận Province	7,836.90	Province of Vietnam.
Shizuoka	7,777.42	Prefecture of Japan.
(Turkey) Tunceli Province	7,774	Province of Turkey.
(Romania) Arad County	7,754	County of Romania.
French Southern and Antarctic Lands	7,747	French Territory Adelie Land.
Miyazaki	7,735.31	Prefecture of Japan.
(Afghanistan) Nangarhar Province	7,727	Province of Afghanistan.
Azuay Province	7,701	Province of Ecuador.
Province of Sassari	7,691.75	Largest province of Italy.
(Laos) Xekong	7,665	Province of Laos.
Pyrénées-Atlantiques	7,645	Department of France.
(Algeria) Oum El Bouaghi Province	7,638	Province of Algeria.
(Turkey) Aksaray Province	7,626	Province of Turkey.
Maguindanao	7,623.75	Province of the Philippines; includes the independent city of Cotabato.
(Bulgaria) Burgas Province	7,618	Largest province of Bulgaria.
(Turkey) Adıyaman Province	7,614	Province of Turkey.
Republic of Adygea	7,600	Third smallest federal subject of Russia.
(Yemen) Dhamar Governorate	7,590	Governorate of Yemen.
(Jordan) Amman	7,579	Governorate of Jordan, its capital Amman is also the country's capital.
Abuja Federal Capital Territory	7,569	Federal Capital Territory of Nigeria (analogous to a state).
Plzeň Region	7,561	Third largest region of the Czech Republic.
Enugu	7,560	State of Nigeria.
(Romania) Bihor County	7,544	County of Romania.
(Nicaragua) Río San Juan	7,541	Region of Nicaragua.
County Cork	7,508	Largest county of the Republic of Ireland, in the province of Munster.
Canary Islands	7,447	Autonomous community of Spain.
(Turkey) Artvin Province	7,436	Province of Turkey.
North Chungcheong Province	7,432	Smallest province of South Korea.
Isère	7,431	Department of France.
Yonne	7,427	Department of France.
(Romania) Dolj County	7,414	County of Romania.
Kumamoto	7,409.35	Prefecture of Japan.
(Papua New Guinea) New Ireland (island)	7,405	Island part of Papua New Guinea.
Huehuetenango	7,400	Department of Guatemala.
Trujillo	7,400	State of Venezuela.
South Tyrol	7,397.86	Second largest and autonomous province of Italy.
(Songkhla province) Songkhla Province	7,394	Province of Thailand.
(Portugal) Évora	7,393	District of Portugal.
(Turkey) Çankırı Province	7,388	Province of Turkey.
Aisne	7,369	Department of France.
(Philippines) Leyte	7,368	Island part of the Philippines.
Chernivtsi Oblast	7,359	Smallest oblast of Ukraine; third smallest political subdivision of Ukraine.
Allier	7,340	Department of France.
(Senegal) Ziguinchor Region	7,339	Region of Senegal.
Nong Khai Province	7,332	Province of Thailand.
(Turkey) Niğde Province	7,312	Province of Turkey.
Zamboanga del Norte	7,301.00	Province of the Philippines.
(Senegal) Sédhiou Region	7,293	Region of Senegal.
Miyagi	7,282.22	Prefecture of Japan.
Vest-Agder	7,281	County of Norway.
(Bulgaria) Sofia Province	7,277	Second largest province of Bulgaria.
(Angola) Cabinda Province	7,270	Second smallest province of Angola.
Region Zealand	7,268.75	Region of Denmark.
(New Zealand) Taranaki	7,257	Third smallest region of New Zealand.
(Borsod-Abaúj-Zemplén County) Borsod-Abaúj-Zemplén	7,247	Second largest county of Hungary.
Cher	7,235	Department of France.
Basque Country	7,234	Autonomous community of Spain.
(Honduras) El Paraíso	7,218	Department of Honduras.
(French Southern and Antarctic Lands) Kerguelen Islands	7,215	Second largest district of the French Southern and Antarctic Lands.
(Lithuania) Utena County	7,201	County of Lithuania.
(Djibouti) Dikhil Region	7,200	Largest region of Djibouti.
(Sa Kaeo province) Sa Kaeo Province	7,195	Province of Thailand.
South Moravian Region	7,194.56	Region of the Czech Republic.
(Turkey) Şırnak Province	7,172	Province of Turkey.
Maine-et-Loire	7,166	Department of France.
(Salzburg (state)) Salzburg	7,154	State of Austria.
(Turkey) Hakkâri Province	7,121	Province of Turkey.
Okayama	7,114.50	Prefecture of Japan.
Graubünden	7,105	Largest canton of Switzerland.
(Laos) Xaisomboun	7,105	Third smallest province of Laos.
Kōchi	7,103.93	Prefecture of Japan.
(Djibouti) Tadjourah Region	7,100	Second largest region of Djibouti.
Yaracuy	7,100	State of Venezuela.
Sikkim	7,096	State of India.
(Romania) Constanța County	7,071	County of Romania.
(Romania) Hunedoara County	7,063	County of Romania.
(Falkland Islands) East Falkland	7,040	Biggest island in the Falkland Islands.
(Denmark) Zealand (Sjælland)	7,031	Island part of Denmark.
(Cambodia) Kampong Speu Province	7,017	Province of Cambodia.
Aragua	7,014	State of Venezuela.
(Morocco) Chaouia-Ouardigha	7,010	Second smallest region of Morocco.
(Apulia) Province of Foggia	7,007	Third largest province of Italy.
(Oman) Al Buraimi Governorate	7,000	Third largest governorate of Oman.
(Canada) Cornwallis Island	6,995	Island in the Arctic Archipelago.
(Vienne (department)) Vienne	6,990	Department of France.
Uppsala County	6,989	County of Sweden.
(Chumphon province) Chumphon Province	6,947	Province of Thailand.
(Finland) Päijät-Häme	6,941.71	Region of Finland.
(Turkey) Giresun Province	6,934	Province of Turkey.
(Scotland) Argyll and Bute	6,930	Second largest unitary district of Scotland.
Alpes-de-Haute-Provence	6,925	Department of France.
(Jordan) Aqaba	6,905	Governorate of Jordan.
(Province of Cuneo) Cuneo Province	6,902	Province of Italy.
(Vietnam) Yên Bái Province	6,899.50	Province of Vietnam.
(Turkey) Burdur Province	6,887	Province of Turkey.
(Vietnam) Bình Phước Province	6,883.40	Province of Vietnam.
Côtes-d'Armor	6,878	Department of France.
(Finland) South Karelia	6,872.13	Region of Finland.
Charente-Maritime	6,864	Department of France.
(Romania) Argeș County	6,862	County of Romania.
(Metropolitan City of Turin) Turin Province	6,827	Province of Italy.
Cumbria	6,824	Second largest administrative county of England.
Morbihan	6,823	Department of France.
Nièvre	6,817	Department of France.
Loire-Atlantique	6,815	Department of France.
(Nicaragua) Matagalpa	6,804	Region of Nicaragua.
(Uzbekistan) Fergana Region	6,800	Region of Uzbekistan.
Vysočina Region	6,795.56	Region of the Czech Republic.
Indre	6,791	Department of France.
Akwa Ibom State	6,788	State of Nigeria.
(Georgia (country)) Mtskheta-Mtianeti	6,786	Third largest region of Georgia.
Loiret	6,775	Department of France.
Ille-et-Vilaine	6,775	Department of France.
(Algeria) Saida Province	6,764	Province of Algeria.
(Portugal) Santarém	6,747	District of Portugal.
(Cuba) Sancti Spíritus Province	6,737	Province of Cuba.
Finistère	6,733	Department of France.
(Uthai Thani province) Uthai Thani Province	6,730	Province of Thailand.
(Malawi) Mangochi	6,729	District of Malawi.
(Vietnam) Cao Bằng Province	6,724.60	Province of Vietnam.
Vendée	6,720	Department of France.
(Kazakhstan) Baikonur Cosmodrome	6717	Spaceport operated by the Russian Federation within Kazakhstan.
(Romania) Mureș County	6,714	County of Romania.
(Province of Cosenza) Cosenza Province	6,710	Province of Italy.
Shimane	6,708.24	Prefecture of Japan.
(Turkey) Bitlis Province	6,707	Province of Turkey.
(Cambodia) Banteay Meanchey Province	6,679	Province of Cambodia.
(Alaska) Prince of Wales Island	6,675	Island part of the U.S. state of Alaska.
(Portugal) Castelo Branco	6,675	District of Portugal.
(Romania) Cluj County	6,674	County of Romania.
(Panama) Ngöbe-Buglé Comarca	6,673	Province of Panama.
Pas-de-Calais	6,671	Department of France.
Davao del Sur	6,667.06	Province of the Philippines; includes the independent city of Davao.
(Equatorial Guinea) Litoral	6,665	Province of Equatorial Guinea.
Negeri Sembilan	6,645	State of Malaysia.
(Romania) Harghita County	6,639	County of Romania.
(Romania) Bacău County	6,621	County of Romania.
(Portugal) Bragança	6,608	District of Portugal.
(Senegal) Thiès Region	6,601	Region of Senegal.
(Sukhothai province) Sukhothai Province	6,596	Province of Thailand.
(Province of Potenza) Potenza Province	6,594	Province of Italy.
(Turkey) Gümüşhane Province	6,575	Province of Turkey.
(Turkey) Kırşehir Province	6,570	Province of Turkey.
Devon	6,561	Third largest administrative county of England.
(Turkey) Kırklareli Province	6,550	Province of Turkey.
(Phitsanulok province) Phitsanulok Province	6,539	Province of Thailand.
Drôme	6,530	Department of France.
South Sardinia	6,530	Province of Italy.
Smallwood Reservoir	6,527	Lake in Canada.
(Vietnam) Đắk Nông Province	6,516.90	Province of Vietnam.
(Leyte (province)) Leyte	6,515.05	Province of the Philippines; includes the independent cities of Ormoc and Tacloban.
(Algeria) Sétif Province	6,504	Province of Algeria.
Stockholm County	6,488	County of Sweden.
(Nicaragua) Chontales	6,481	Region of Nicaragua.
(Bulgaria) Blagoevgrad Province	6,478	Third largest province of Bulgaria.
Chiriquí Province	6,477	Province of Panama.
(Georgia (country)) Imereti	6,448	Region of Georgia.
Delaware	6,447	State of the United States.
(Scotland) Dumfries and Galloway	6,439	Third largest unitary district of Scotland.
(Afghanistan) Paktia Province	6,432	Province of Afghanistan.
(Georgia (country)) Samtskhe-Javakheti	6,412	Region of Georgia.
Tochigi	6,408.09	Prefecture of Japan.
Lake Turkana	6,405	Lake in Kenya.
(Pest County) Pest	6,393	Third largest county of Hungary.
Siple Island	6,390	Island part of Antarctica.
(Vietnam) Lào Cai Province	6,383.90	Province of Vietnam.
(Cuba) Las Tunas Province	6,373	Province of Cuba.
(Prachuap Khiri Khan province) Prachuap Khiri Khan Province	6,368	Province of Thailand.
(Cuba) Guantánamo Province	6,366	Province of Cuba.
Gunma	6,362.28	Prefecture of Japan.
(Canada) Graham Island	6,361	Island in the Haidwa Gwaii archipelago, part of Canada.
(Fiji) Western	6,360	A division of Fiji.
(Vietnam) Kiên Giang Province	6,348.30	Province of Vietnam.
Santiago de Cuba Province	6,343	Province of Cuba.
Loir-et-Cher	6,343	Department of France.
Ebonyi State	6,342	State of Nigeria.
(China) Shanghai	6,341	Largest city of China by Population.
Ōita	6,340.71	Prefecture of Japan.
(Chaiyaphum province) Chaiyaphum Province	6,338	Province of Thailand.
(Phatthalung province) Phatthalung Province	6,335	Province of Thailand.
(Province of Perugia) Perugia Province	6,334	Province of Italy.
Reindeer Lake	6,330	Lake in Canada.
(Aberdeenshire (historic)) Aberdeenshire	6,318	Unitary district of Scotland.
Haute-Garonne	6,309	Department of France.
(Romania) Maramureș County	6,304	County of Romania.
Västmanland County	6,302	County of Sweden.
(Uzbekistan) Xorazm Region	6,300	Region of Uzbekistan.
Seine-Maritime	6,278	Department of France.
(Turkey) Edirne Province	6,276	Province of Turkey.
Gers	6,257	Department of France.
(Los Ríos Province) Los Ríos	6,254	Province of Ecuador.
(Georgia (country)) Samegrelo-Zemo Svaneti	6,242	Region of Georgia.
(Romania) Alba County	6,242	County of Romania.
(Phetchabun province) Phetchabun Province	6,225	Province of Thailand.
(Turkey) Tekirdağ Province	6,218	Province of Turkey.
(Moselle (department)) Moselle	6,216	Department of France.
Lake Eyre	6,216	Lake in South Australia.
Trentino	6,212	Province of Italy. Autonomous province.
(Malawi) Lilongwe	6,211	District of Malawi.
(Meuse (department)) Meuse	6,211	Department of France.
Haute-Marne	6,211	Department of France.
(Hajdú-Bihar County) Hajdú-Bihar	6,211	County of Hungary.
(Turkey) Gaziantep Province	6,207	Province of Turkey.
Sarthe	6,206	Department of France.
Jackson Purchase	6,202	Eight Kentucky counties purchased from the Chickasaw Indians.
(Russia) New Siberia	6,201	Island part of the New Siberian Islands archipelago, part of Russia.
Lake Issyk-Kul	6,200	Lake in Kyrgyzstan.
Loei Province	6,200	Province of Thailand.
(Fiji) Northern	6,198	A division of Fiji.
(Laos) Bokeo	6,196	Second smallest province of Laos.
(Somme (department)) Somme	6,170	Department of France.
(Cambodia) Oddar Meancheay Province	6,158	Province of Cambodia.
County Galway	6,151	Second largest county in the Republic of Ireland, largest county in the province of Connacht.
(Serbia) Zlatibor	6,140	District of Serbia.
Aude	6,139	Department of France.
Indre-et-Loire	6,127	Department of France.
Yamaguchi	6,112.30	Prefecture of Japan.
Chimbu Province	6,112	Province of Papua New Guinea.
Everglades National Park	6,110	Park in the U.S. state of Florida.
Colonia Department	6,106	Department of Uruguay.
Orne	6,103	Department of France.
(Romania) Buzău County	6,103	County of Romania.
Hérault	6,101	Department of France.
(Togo) Maritime	6,100	Smallest region of Togo.
(Vietnam) Quảng Ninh Province	6,099.00	Province of Vietnam.
Ibaraki	6,097.06	Prefecture of Japan.
(Syria) Idlib	6,097	Governorate of Syria.
(Portugal) Portalegre	6,065	District of Portugal.
Södermanland County	6,061	County of Sweden.
Auckland	6,059	Second smallest region of New Zealand.
(Samar (province)) Samar	6,048.03	Province of the Philippines.
Eure	6,040	Department of France.
(Vietnam) Bình Định Province	6,039.60	Province of Vietnam.
(Somogy County) Somogy	6,036	County of Hungary.
Savoie	6,028	Department of France.
(Vietnam) Hà Tĩnh Province	6,026.50	Province of Vietnam.
Palestine	6,020	Territory in the Middle East; figure consists of the West Bank and Gaza Strip.
(Indonesia) Mentawai Islands Regency	6,011.35	Chain of islands part of Indonesia.
(Chonburi province) Chon Buri Province	6,009	Province of Thailand.
Aube	6,004	Department of France.
(Turkey) Ordu Province	6,001	Province of Turkey.
Lake Urmia	6,001	Lake in Iran.
Dongting Lake	6,000	Lake in China.
Deux-Sèvres	5,999	Department of France.
El Oro Province	5,988	Province of Ecuador.
(Guinea-Bissau) Bafatá	5,981.1	Region of Guinea-Bissau.
(Afghanistan) Parwan Province	5,974	Province of Afghanistan.
(Bulgaria) Plovdiv Province	5,973	Province of Bulgaria.
(Var (department)) Var	5,973	Department of France.
(Rwanda) Southern Province	5,963	Province of Rwanda.
(Cuba) Ciego de Ávila Province	5,962	Province of Cuba.
Canton of Bern	5,959	Second largest canton of Switzerland.
(The Bahamas) Andros Island	5,957	Archipelago of the Bahamas.
Charente	5,956	Department of France.
(Algeria) Mascara Province	5,941	Province of Algeria.
Manche	5,938	Department of France.
(Szabolcs-Szatmár-Bereg County) Szabolcs-Szatmár-Bereg	5,936	County of Hungary.
Lincolnshire	5,921	Administrative county of England.
Seine-et-Marne	5,915	Department of France.
Zamboanga del Sur	5,914.16	Province of the Philippines; includes the independent city of Zamboanga.
(Vietnam) Đồng Nai Province	5,903.90	Province of Vietnam.
(Romania) Neamț County	5,896	County of Romania.
(Rwanda) Western Province	5,883	Province of Rwanda.
Eure-et-Loir	5,880	Department of France.
(Vosges (department)) Vosges	5,874	Department of France.
(Vietnam) Tuyên Quang Province	5,870.40	Province of Vietnam.
Occidental Mindoro	5,865.71	Province of the Philippines.
(Turkey) Sinop Province	5,862	Province of Turkey.
Oise	5,860	Department of France.
Corrèze	5,857	Department of France.
Gard	5,853	Department of France.
(Eswatini) Lubombo	5,849.11	Region of Eswatini.
Distrito Federal	5,802	State of Brazil.
Ekiti State	5,797	State of Nigeria.
(Romania) Teleorman County	5,790	County of Romania.
Mie	5,774.40	Prefecture of Japan.
Brunei	5,765	Country in Country in Southeast Asia.
(Australia) Melville Island	5,765	Island part of Australia.
(Romania) Vâlcea County	5,765	County of Romania.
(United States) Bolivar Republic	5,762	Micronation State lying on the Mississippi River. It Covers the Mississippi Counties of Bolivar, Coahoma, Tallahatchie, Sunflower, Leflore, and Washington, as well covering the Arkansas counties of Desha and Philips
Ain	5,762	Department of France.
(Tarn (department)) Tarn	5,758	Department of France.
Friesland	5,753	Province of the Netherlands.
Nueva Ecija	5,751.33	Province of the Philippines.
Nord	5,743	Department of France.
Cantal	5,726	Department of France.
(Finland) Kanta-Häme	5,707.63	Region of Finland.
Lake Torrens	5,698	Lake in South Australia.
Ehime	5,676.11	Prefecture of Japan.
Central	5,674	Province of Sri Lanka.
Davao Oriental	5,670.07	Province of the Philippines.
Havana Province	5,669	Province of Cuba.
Prince Edward Island	5,660	Province of Canada.
(Palestine) West Bank	5,655	Bigger one of the two territories of Palestine.
(Province of Nuoro) Nuoro Province	5,638	Province of Italy.
Chimborazo Province	5,637	Province of Ecuador.
Bali	5,633	Province of Indonesia.
(Békés County) Békés	5,631	County of Hungary.
(Romania) Gorj County	5,602	County of Romania.
Rivercess	5,594	County of Liberia.
County Mayo	5,588	Third largest county in the Republic of Ireland, second largest county in the province of Connacht.
(Fiji) Vanua Levu	5,587	Second-largest island of Fiji.
(Jász-Nagykun-Szolnok County) Jász-Nagykun-Szolnok	5,582	County of Hungary.
(Turkey) Ardahan Province	5,576	Province of Turkey.
Creuse	5,565	Department of France.
(Chile) Wellington Island	5,556	Island part of Chile.
(Syria) As-Suwayda	5,550	Governorate of Syria.
Hautes-Alpes	5,549	Department of France.
(Calvados (department)) Calvados	5,548	Department of France.
Vänern	5,545	Lake in Sweden.
Southern	5,544	Province of Sri Lanka.
(Govisümber Province) Govisümber	5,540	Third smallest aimag of Mongolia.
Ardèche	5,529	Department of France.
(Cambodia) Kampong Chhnang Province	5,521	Province of Cambodia.
(Turkey) Amasya Province	5,520	Province of Turkey.
Haute-Vienne	5,520	Department of France.
(Portugal) Guarda	5,518	District of Portugal.
(Nakhon Pathom province) Nakhon Pathom Province	5,513	Province of Thailand.
Nakhchivan	5,502	Republic of Azerbaijan.
(Canada) Coats Island	5,498	Island part of the Arctic Archipelago.
(Romania) Olt County	5,498	County of Romania.
(Equatorial Guinea) Wele-Nzas	5,478	Province of Equatorial Guinea.
(Romania) Iași County	5,476	County of Romania.
(Solomon Islands) Western Province	5,475	Largest province of the Solomon Islands.
Aguascalientes	5,471	State of Mexico.
(Turkey) Nevşehir Province	5,467	Province of Turkey.
Camarines Sur	5,465.26	Province of the Philippines; includes the independent city of Naga.
Halland County	5,454	Third smallest county of Sweden.
Pangasinan	5,451.08	Province of the Philippines; includes the independent city of Dagupan.
(Romania) Sibiu County	5,432	County of Romania.
Moravian-Silesian Region	5,426.83	Region of the Czech Republic.
Alytus County	5,425	County of Lithuania.
Liguria	5,421	Third smallest region of Italy.
Pärnu County	5,419	Largest county of Estonia.
(United States) Uinta County	5,410	County in Wyoming
(Turkey) Siirt Province	5,406	Province of Turkey.
(Guinea-Bissau) Oio	5,403.4	Region of Guinea-Bissau.
(Turkey) Hatay Province	5,403	Province of Turkey.
Lake Winnipegosis	5,403	Lake in Canada.
(Alaska) Chichagof Island	5,388	Island part of the U.S. state of Alaska.
Negros Oriental	5,385.53	Province of the Philippines.
Norfolk	5,372	Administrative county of England.
(Metropolitan City of Rome Capital) Rome Province	5,364	Province of Italy.
(Romania) Brașov County	5,363	County of Romania.
Lot-et-Garonne	5,361	Department of France.
Haute-Saône	5,360	Department of France.
(Suphan Buri province) Suphanburi Province	5,358	Province of Thailand.
(Romania) Bistrița-Năsăud County	5,355	County of Romania.
(Solomon Islands) Guadalcanal	5,353	Largest island of the Solomon Islands.
(Lika-Senj County) Lika-Senj	5,353	Largest county of Croatia.
(Thailand) Buriram	5,351	Province of Thailand.
(Yemen) Ibb Governorate	5,350	Governorate of Yemen.
(Armenia) Gegharkunik Province	5,348	Largest province of Armenia.
(Turkey) Uşak Province	5,341	Province of Turkey.
(Guadalcanal Province) Guadalcanal	5,336	Second largest province of the Solomon Islands.
Ústí nad Labem Region	5,334.52	Region of the Czech Republic.
(Vietnam) Cà Mau Province	5,331.70	Province of Vietnam.
Cebu	5,331.07	Province of the Philippines; includes the independent cities of Cebu, Lapu-Lapu and Mandaue.
Cantabria	5,321	Third smallest autonomous community of Spain.
(Romania) Vaslui County	5,318	County of Romania.
(Scotland) Perth and Kinross	5,311	Unitary district of Scotland.
Lake Albert	5,299	Lake in Africa between Uganda and Zaire.
(Mae Hong Son province) Mae Hong Son Province	5,292	Province of Thailand.
Cotopaxi Province	5,287	Province of Ecuador.
(Greece) South Aegean	5,286	Periphery of Greece.
Olomouc Region	5,266.57	Region of the Czech Republic.
(Canada) Amund Ringnes Island	5,255	Island part of the Arctic Archipelago.
Sultan Kudarat	5,251.34	Province of the Philippines.
Meurthe-et-Moselle	5,246	Department of France.
(Benin) Zou Department	5,243	Department of Benin.
Doubs	5,234	Department of France.
(Ardennes (department)) Ardennes	5,229	Department of France.
Valais	5,224	Third largest canton of Switzerland.
(Turkey) Istanbul Province	5,220	Province of Turkey.
(Finland) Central Ostrobothnia	5,219.58	Region of Finland.
(Vietnam) Khánh Hòa Province	5,217.60	Province of Vietnam.
(Lot (department)) Lot	5,217	Department of France.
Klaipėda County	5,209	County of Lithuania.
(Wales) Powys	5,204	Largest unitary authority of Wales.
(Ratchaburi province) Ratchaburi Province	5,197	Province of Thailand.
(Honduras) Comayagua	5,196	Department of Honduras.
Colima	5,191	State of Mexico.
Mayenne	5,175	Department of France.
(Guinea-Bissau) Cacheu	5,174.9	Region of Guinea-Bissau.
Aichi	5,172.48	Prefecture of Japan.
Lozère	5,167	Department of France.
Grand Cape Mount	5,162	County of Liberia.
Chiba	5,157.65	Prefecture of Japan.
(Russia) Bolshoy Lyakhovsky Island	5,157	Island in the New Siberian Islands archipelago, part of Russia.
(Vietnam) Quảng Ngãi Province	5,152.70	Province of Vietnam.
Flores Department	5,144	Department of Uruguay.
(León, Spain) León	5,138	Region of Nicaragua.
Gelderland	5,136	Province of the Netherlands.
Imo State	5,135	State of Nigeria.
(Alaska) St. Lawrence Island	5,135	Island part of the U.S. state of Alaska.
Trinidad and Tobago	5,130	Country in the Caribbean.
(Georgia (country)) Kvemo Kartli	5,122	Region of Georgia.
(Kuwait) Ahmadi	5,120	Governorate of Kuwait.
Lake Mweru	5,120	Lake in Africa between Democratic Republic of the Congo and Zambia.
(Botswana) North-East District	5,120	Second smallest district of Botswana.
(Honduras) Santa Bárbara	5,115	Department of Honduras.
River Gee	5,113	County of Liberia.
(Chile) Riesco Island	5,100	Island part of Chile.
(Uzbekistan) Sirdaryo Region	5,100	Third smallest region of Uzbekistan.
(Romania) Călărași County	5,088	County of Romania.
Bouches-du-Rhône	5,087	Department of France.
North Brabant	5,082	Province of the Netherlands.
(Svalbard) Edgeøya	5,073	Third-largest island of Svalbard, Norway.
Nettilling Lake	5,066	Lake in Canada; largest lake entirely on an island.
(Vietnam) Thừa Thiên–Huế Province	5,065.30	Province of Vietnam.
(Portugal) Setúbal	5,064	District of Portugal.
(Vietnam) Phú Yên Province	5,060.60	Province of Vietnam.
(Canada) Mackenzie King Island	5,048	Island part of the Arctic Archipelago.
(Province of L'Aquila) L'Aquila Province	5,047	Province of Italy.
La Rioja	5,045	Second smallest autonomous community of Spain.
(Albania) Korçë County	5,044	Largest county of Albania.
(Jamaica) Middlesex County	5,041.9	County of Jamaica.
Northumberland	5,026	Administrative county of England.
(Metropolitan City of Palermo) Palermo Province	5,009.28	Province of Italy.
(Trinidad and Tobago) Trinidad	5,009	Largest of the two main islands of Trinidad and Tobago.
(Portugal) Viseu	5,007	District of Portugal.
(France) Jura	4,999	Department of France.
Balearic Islands	4,992	Smallest autonomous community of Spain.
(Uruguay) San José Department	4,992	Department of Uruguay.
Fukuoka	4,986.40	Prefecture of Japan.
(Romania) Botoșani County	4,986	County of Romania.
(France) Haute-Loire	4,977	Department of France.
(Russia) Kolguyev Island	4,968	Island part of Russia.
Sabaragamuwa	4,968	Province of Sri Lanka.
(Costa Rica) San José Province	4,960	Third smallest province of Costa Rica.
(Portugal) Faro	4,960	District of Portugal.
(Bulgaria) Stara Zagora Province	4,959	Province of Bulgaria.
Morelos	4,950	State of Mexico.
(Paraguay) Cordillera Department	4,948	Department of Paraguay.
(Finland) Kymenlaakso	4,947.65	Region of Finland.
(Afghanistan) Kunar Province	4,942	Province of Afghanistan.
(Romania) Mehedinți County	4,933	County of Romania.
(Panama) Coclé	4,927	Province of Panama.
(Philippines) Surigao del Sur	4,925.18	Province of the Philippines.
(Province of Salerno) Salerno Province	4,923	Province of Italy.
(Thailand) Trang Province	4,918	Province of Thailand.
(Norway) Akershus	4,917	County of Norway.
(Province of Udine) Udine Province	4,905	Province of Italy.
(Algeria) Aïn Defla Province	4,897	Province of Algeria.
(Ecuador) Imbabura Province	4,896	Province of Ecuador.
(Haiti) Artibonite	4,895	Largest department of Haiti.
(Panama) Colón Province	4,891	Province of Panama.
(France) Ariège	4,890	Department of France.
(Cambodia) Prey Veng Province	4,883	Province of Cambodia.
(Malawi) Chikwawa	4,878	District of Malawi.
(Cambodia) Kampot Province	4,873.2	Province of Cambodia.
(Algeria) Relizane Province	4,870	Province of Algeria.
(Vietnam) Bắc Kạn Province	4,868.40	Province of Vietnam.
(Brazil) Ilha Grande de Gurupá	4,864	Fluvial island part of Brazil.
County Donegal	4,860	County in the Republic of Ireland, largest county in the province of Ulster.
(Nigeria) Abia State	4,857	Third smallest state of Nigeria.
(Romania) Vrancea County	4,857	County of Romania.
Lake Nipigon	4,843	Lake in Canada.
(Nicaragua) Chinandega	4,822	Region of Nicaragua.
(Philippines) Bohol	4,820.95	Province of the Philippines.
(Turkey) Sakarya Province	4,817	Province of Turkey.
County Kerry	4,807	County in the Republic of Ireland, second largest county in the province of Munster.
(Papua New Guinea) Jiwaka Province	4,798	Third smallest province of Papua New Guinea.
(Uruguay) Maldonado Department	4,793	Third smallest department of Uruguay.
(Algeria) Chlef Province	4,791	Province of Algeria.
(Province of Brescia) Brescia Province	4,785.62	Province of Italy.
(France) Loire	4,781	Department of France.
(Romania) Brăila County	4,766	County of Romania.
(Thailand) Prachinburi Province	4,762	Province of Thailand.
(Nigeria) Anambra State	4,761	Second smallest state of Nigeria.
(Jordan) Zarqa	4,761	Governorate of Jordan.
(Vietnam) Quảng Trị Province	4,760.10	Province of Vietnam.
(Czech Republic) Hradec Králové Region	4,758.54	Region of the Czech Republic.
(France) Bas-Rhin	4,755	Department of France.
(Scotland) Scottish Borders	4,734	Unitary district of Scotland.
Wakayama	4,724.69	Prefecture of Japan.
(Romania) Prahova County	4,716	County of Romania.
(Thailand) Khon Kaen Province	4,709	Province of Thailand.
Lake Manitoba	4,706	Lake in Canada.
(Bulgaria) Dobrich Province	4,700	Province of Bulgaria.
(Djibouti) Obock Region	4,700	Region of Djibouti.
(Turkey) Batman Province	4,694	Province of Turkey.
(Denmark) North Jutlandic Island	4,685	Island part of Denmark.
(Turkey) Trabzon Province	4,685	Province of Turkey.
(Vietnam) Hòa Bình Province	4,684.20	Province of Vietnam.
(Bulgaria) Veliko Tarnovo Province	4,684	Province of Bulgaria.
(France) Haute-Corse	4,666	Department of France.
Great Salt Lake	4,662	Lake in the United States.
Carabobo	4,650	State of Venezuela.
(Japan) Ryukyu Islands	4,642.11	Chain of islands part of Japan.
(Philippines) Eastern Samar	4,640.73	Province of the Philippines.
(Ecuador) Isabela Island	4,640	Largest island of the Galapagos Island, part of Ecuador.
(Indonesia) Lombok	4,625	Island part of Indonesia.
Kyoto	4,612.19	Prefecture of Japan.
(Panama) Bocas del Toro Province	4,601	Province of Panama.
(Haiti) Ouest	4,595	Second largest department of Haiti.
(Georgia (country)) Racha-Lechkhumi and Kvemo Svaneti	4,568	Second smallest region of Georgia.
(Bhutan) Gasa	4,561	Largest district of Bhutan.
Lake Taymyr	4,560	Lake in Russia.
(Malawi) Rumphi	4,560	District of Malawi.
(Algeria) Souk Ahras Province	4,541	Province of Algeria.
(Croatia) Split-Dalmatia	4,540	Second largest county of Croatia.
(Uruguay) Canelones Department	4,536	Second smallest department of Uruguay.
(Thailand) Phetchaburi Province	4,531	Province of Thailand.
(Falkland Islands) West Falkland	4,531	Smaller of the 2 main islands of the Falkland Islands.
(Thailand) Yala Province	4,521	Province of Thailand.
(Czech Republic) Pardubice Region	4,518.63	Region of the Czech Republic.
(Armenia) Syunik Province	4,506	Second largest province of Armenia.
(Thailand) Lampang Province	4,506	Province of Thailand.
(Province of Grosseto) Grosseto Province	4,504	Province of Italy.
(Israel) Northern District	4,501	Second largest District of Israel.
(Vietnam) Long An Province	4,493.80	Province of Vietnam.
(Hungary) Veszprém	4,493	County of Hungary.
Qinghai Lake	4,489	Lake in China.
(Philippines) Davao de Oro	4,479.77	Province of the Philippines.
(Indonesia) Belitung	4,478	Island part of Indonesia.
(Thailand) Nan Province	4,475	Province of Thailand.
(Philippines) Cebu	4,468	Island part of the Philippines.
(Croatia) Sisak-Moslavina	4,468	Third largest county of Croatia.
(Romania) Galați County	4,466	County of Romania.
Yamanashi	4,465.27	Prefecture of Japan.
(France) Hautes-Pyrénées	4,464	Department of France.
(Lithuania) Marijampolė County	4,463	County of Lithuania.
Adelaide Island	4,463	Island part of Antarctica.
(Canada) Stefansson Island	4,463	Island part of the Arctic Archipelago.
(Afghanistan) Kabul Province	4,462	Province of Afghanistan.
(Romania) Ialomița County	4,453	County of Romania.
(Luxembourg (Belgium)) Luxembourg	4,443	Province of Wallonia, Belgium.
(Algeria) Bouira Province	4,439	Province of Algeria.
Molise	4,438	Second smallest region of Italy.
(Hungary) Baranya	4,430	County of Hungary.
(Indonesia) Madura Island	4,429	Island part of Indonesia.
(Philippines) South Cotabato	4,428.81	Province of the Philippines; includes the independent city of General Santos.
(Romania) Satu Mare County	4,418	County of Romania.
(Lithuania) Tauragė County	4,411	County of Lithuania.
(Indonesia) Buton	4,408	Island part of Indonesia.
(Azerbaijan) Nagorno-Karabakh	4,400	Disputed territory. Recognized as part of Azerbaijan.
Saimaa	4,400	Lake in Finland, area is estimated.
(Panama) Emberá	4,398	Province of Panama.
(Bulgaria) Pazardzhik Province	4,393	Province of Bulgaria.
(France) Haute-Savoie	4,388	Department of France.
(Guatemala) Escuintla	4,384	Department of Guatemala.
(Philippines) Nueva Vizcaya	4,378.80	Province of the Philippines.
(Australia) Kangaroo Island	4,374	Island part of Australia.
(Turkey) Kırıkkale Province	4,365	Province of Turkey.
(Thailand) Chiang Rai Province	4,363	Province of Thailand.
(Alaska) Admiralty Island	4,362	Island part of the U.S. state of Alaska.
(Hungary) Fejér	4,359	County of Hungary.
(Senegal) Diourbel Region	4,359	Third smallest region of Senegal.
(Philippines) Apayao	4,351.23	Province of the Philippines.
(Lithuania) Telšiai County	4,350	County of Lithuania.
Lake of the Woods	4,350	Lake in North America between Canada and the United States.
(Thailand) Maha Sarakham Province	4,340	Province of Thailand.
(Malawi) Nkhotakota	4,338	District of Malawi.
(Malawi) Chitipa	4,334	District of Malawi.
(Portugal) Vila Real	4,328	District of Portugal.
Harju County	4,327	Second largest county of Estonia.
(Turkey) Bilecik Province	4,307	Province of Turkey.
County Tipperary	4,305	County in the Republic of Ireland, third largest county in the province of Munster.
(France) Alpes-Maritimes	4,299	Department of France.
(Papua New Guinea) Western Highlands Province	4,299	Second smallest province of Papua New Guinea.
(Fiji) Central	4,293	A subdivision of Fiji.
(Honduras) Lempira	4,290	Department of Honduras.
(Lesotho) Maseru	4,279	District of Lesotho.
(Lesotho) Thaba-Tseka	4,270	District of Lesotho.
(Hungary) Csongrád	4,263	County of Hungary.
(Honduras) Atlántida	4,251	Department of Honduras.
(Vanuatu) Sanma Province	4,248	Largest province of Vanuatu.
Toyama	4,247.61	Prefecture of Japan.
(Serbia) South Banat	4,245	District of Serbia.
(Philippines) Oriental Mindoro	4,238.38	Province of the Philippines.
(Solomon Islands) Malaita Province	4,225	Third largest province of the Solomon Islands.
(Bulgaria) Pleven Province	4,216	Province of Bulgaria.
(Honduras) Choluteca	4,211	Department of Honduras.
(Alaska) Nunivak Island	4,209	Island part of the U.S. state of Alaska.
(Bulgaria) Yambol Province	4,209	Province of Bulgaria.
(Hungary) Győr-Moson-Sopron	4,208	County of Hungary.
(Uzbekistan) Andijan Region	4,200	Second smallest region of Uzbekistan.
(Philippines) Abra	4,198.20	Province of the Philippines.
Fukui	4,190.49	Prefecture of Japan.
Khanka Lake	4,190	Lake in Asia between Russia and China.
Ishikawa	4,186.09	Prefecture of Japan.
(Norway) Østfold	4,183	County of Norway.
(Malawi) Nhkata Bay	4,182	District of Malawi.
(Egypt) Sharqia Governorate	4,180	Governorate of Egypt.
(Nicaragua) Boaco	4,177	Region of Nicaragua.
(Thailand) Pattani Province	4,171	Province of Thailand.
French Polynesia	4,167	French overseas collectivity.
Transnistria	4,163	Also known as Pridnestrovie, it is a breakaway state internationally recognised as a part of the Republic of Moldova.
(Thailand) Yasothon Province	4,162	Province of Thailand.
(Senegal) Kaolack Region	4,157	Second smallest region of Senegal.
(Croatia) Osijek-Baranja	4,155	County of Croatia.
(Afghanistan) Khost Province	4,152	Province of Afghanistan.
(Philippines) Masbate	4,151.78	Province of the Philippines.
(Cuba) Cienfuegos Province	4,149	Third smallest province of Cuba.
Tokushima	4,146.65	Prefecture of Japan.
(Colombia) Risaralda Department	4,140	District of Colombia.
(Solomon Islands) Isabel	4,136	Province of the Solomon Islands.
(Bulgaria) Lovech Province	4,134	Province of Bulgaria.
Nagasaki	4,132.09	Prefecture of Japan.
(Alaska) Nunivak Island	4,119	Island part of the U.S. state of Alaska.
(Chile) Hoste Island	4,117	Island part of Chile.
(France) Pyrénées-Orientales	4,116	Department of France.
(Algeria) Bordj Bou Arreridj Province	4,115	Province of Algeria.
(Algeria) Guelma Province	4,101	Province of Algeria.
Spaatz Island	4,100	Island part of Antarctica.
(Bulgaria) Vratsa Province	4,098	Province of Bulgaria.
(Eswatini) Manzini	4,093.59	Region of Eswatini.
North Holland	4,092	Province of The Netherlands
(Lesotho) Mokhotlong	4,075	District of Lesotho.
(Turkey) Karabük Province	4,074	Province of Turkey.
(Philippines) Sulu Archipelago	4,068	Chain of islands in the Malay Archipelago part of the Philippines.
(Alaska) Baranof Island	4,065	Island part of the U.S. state of Alaska.
(Romania) Dâmbovița County	4,054	County of Romania.
(Indonesia) Nias	4,048	Island part of Indonesia.
(Bhutan) Wangdue Phodrang	4,046	Second largest district of Bhutan.
(Peru) Tumbes Region	4,046	Second smallest region of Peru.
(Vietnam) Tây Ninh Province	4,035.90	Province of Vietnam.
Cape Verde	4,033	Country in Africa.
(Bulgaria) Haskovo Province	4,033	Province of Bulgaria.
(Bulgaria) Kardzhali Province	4,032	Province of Bulgaria.
(Algeria) Skikda Province	4,026	Province of Algeria.
Shiga	4,017.38	Prefecture of Japan.
(Serbia) South Bačka	4,016	District of Serbia.
Tlaxcala	4,016	State of Mexico.
Pa Laung	4,015	Self-administered zone in Myanmar.
(France) Corse-du-Sud	4,014	Department of France.
Republic of Ingushetia	4,000	Federal subject of Russia (estimated; the exact area is unknown as the border of Ingushetia with Chechnya has not been demarcated).
(Yemen) Ad Dali' Governorate	4,000	Third smallest governorate of Yemen.
Burgenland	3,966	Third smallest state of Austria.
(Czech Republic) Zlín Region	3,963.55	Third smallest region of the Czech Republic.
(Haiti) Centre	3,597	Third largest department of Haiti.
(Vanuatu) Espiritu Santo	3,955.5	Largest island of Vanuatu.
(Honduras) Cortés	3,954	Department of Honduras.
Sarygamysh Lake	3,950	Lake in Asia between Uzbekistan and Turkmenistan.
(Portugal) Coimbra	3,947	District of Portugal.
(Equatorial Guinea) Kié-Ntem	3,943	Province of Equatorial Guinea.
(Jamaica) Cornwall County	3,939.3	County of Jamaica.
(Laos) Vientiane Province	3,920	Smallest province of Laos.
(Turkey) Rize Province	3,920	Province of Turkey.
(Serbia) Raška	3,918	District of Serbia.
(Greenland) Milne Land	3,913	Island part of Greenland.
(Ecuador) Cañar Province	3,908	Province of Ecuador.
South Georgia and the South Sandwich Islands	3,903	British Territory Antarctica Island.
South Ossetia	3,900	Partially recognised country.
(Liberia) Grand Kru	3,895	County of Liberia.
(Emirate of Dubai) Dubai	3,885	Second largest emirate of the United Arab Emirates.
(Afghanistan) Logar Province	3,880	Province of Afghanistan.
(Serbia) Braničevo	3,865	District of Serbia.
(Romania) Sălaj County	3,864	County of Romania.
(Thailand) Narathiwat Province	3,859	Province of Thailand.
(Paraguay) Guairá	3,846	Third smallest department of Paraguay.
(Liège Province) Liège	3,844	Province of Wallonia, Belgium.
(Afghanistan) Laghman Province	3,843	Province of Afghanistan.
(Solomon Islands) Choiseul	3,837	Province of the Solomon Islands.
(Solomon Islands) Malaita	3,386	Second-largest island of the Solomon Islands.
(Greece) North Aegean	3,836	Third smallest periphery of Greece.
Dubawnt Lake	3,833	Lake in Canada.
(Indonesia) Siberut	3,829	Island part of Indonesia.
(Vietnam) Bắc Giang Province	3,827.40	Province of Vietnam.
(Metropolitan City of Bari) Bari Province	3,825	Province of Italy.
(Philippines) Lanao del Norte	3,824.79	Province of the Philippines; includes the independent city of Iligan.
(Tuscany) Siena Province	3,821	Province of Italy.
(Philippines) Bohol	3,821	Island part of the Philippines.
(Bulgaria) Varna Province	3,819	Province of Bulgaria.
(Greece) Attica	3,808	Second smallest periphery of Greece.
(Panama) Los Santos Province	3,805	Province of Panama.
(England) Suffolk	3,801	Administrative county of England.
(Hainaut Province) Hainaut	3,800	Province of Wallonia, Belgium.
Saitama	3,797.75	Prefecture of Japan.
(Yemen) Socotra	3,796	Archipelago part of Yemen.
(Guatemala) San Marcos	3,791	Department of Guatemala.
(Armenia) Lori Province	3,789	Third largest province of Armenia.
(Eswatini) Shiselweni	3,786.71	Region of Eswatini.
(Hungary) Zala	3,784	County of Hungary.
(Afghanistan) Panjshir	3,771	Province of Afghanistan.
(Malawi) Dedza	3,754	District of Malawi.
(Syria) Daraa	3,730	Governorate of Syria.
(South Georgia and the South Sandwich Islands) South Georgia	3,718	Main island of the British territory of South Georgia and the South Sandwich Islands
(France) Tarn-et-Garonne	3,718	Department of France.
(Philippines) Zambales	3,714.40	Province of the Philippines; includes the independent city of Olongapo.
(Romania) Covasna County	3,710	Third smallest county of Romania.
(Greece) Euboea	3,707	Island part of Greece.
(Hungary) Tolna	3,703	County of Hungary.
(India) Goa	3,702	State of India.
(Metropolitan City of Bologna) Bologna Province	3,702	Province of Italy.
(Ecuador) Carchi Province	3,699	Third smallest province of Ecuador.
Lääne-Viru County	3,696	Third largest county of Estonia.
(Philippines) Northern Samar	3,692.93	Province of the Philippines.
Nara	3,690.94	Prefecture of Japan.
(England) Hampshire	3,688	Administrative county of England.
(Chile) Santa Inés Island	3,688	Island part of Chile.
South Shetland Islands	3,687	Archipelago of Antarctica.
Western	3,684	Province of Sri Lanka.
(Balearic Islands) Mallorca	3,667	Largest island of the Balearic Islands, part of Spain.
(Solomon Islands) Santa Isabel Island	3,665	Third-largest island of the Solomon Islands.
(Namur Province) Namur	3,664	Province of Wallonia, Belgium.
(Turkey) Bayburt Province	3,652	Province of Turkey.
(Bulgaria) Sliven Province	3,646	Province of Bulgaria.
(Croatia) Zadar	3,646	County of Croatia.
(Hungary) Heves	3,637	County of Hungary.
(New York (state)) Long Island	3,629	Island part of the U.S. state of New York.
(Croatia) Karlovac	3,626	County of Croatia.
(Turkey) Kocaeli Province	3,626	Province of Turkey.
(Eswatini) Hhohho	3,625.17	Region of Eswatini.
(Serbia) Zaječae	3,623	District of Serbia.
(Lazio) Viterbo Province	3,615	Province of Italy.
Danu	3,610.6	Self-administered zone in Myanmar.
(Afghanistan) Panjshir Province	3,610	Province of Afghanistan.
(Province of Belluno) Belluno Province	3,609	Province of Italy.
(Philippines) Zamboanga Sibugay	3,607.75	Province of the Philippines.
(Yemen) Socotra (main island)	3,607	Largest island of the Socotra archipelago, part of Yemen.
(Philippines) Sarangani	3,601.25	Province of the Philippines.
(Indonesia) Wetar	3,600	Island part of Indonesia.
(Bulgaria) Montana Province	3,595	Province of Bulgaria.
(Latvia) Liepāja district	3,594	Largest district of Latvia.
(Croatia) Primorje-Gorski Kotar	3,588	County of Croatia.
(Malawi) Machinga	3,582	District of Malawi.
(Thailand) Saraburi Province	3,577	Province of Thailand.
(Sicily) Catania Province	3,573.68	Province of Italy.
(Dominican Republic) San Juan	3,569.39	Largest province of the Dominican Republic.
(Cambodia) Kandal Province	3,568	Third smallest province of Cambodia.
(France) Vaucluse	3,567	Department of France.
(Cambodia) Takéo Province	3,563	Second smallest province of Cambodia.
(Albania) Shkodër County	3,562	Second largest county of Albania.
(England) Cornwall	3,559	Administrative county of England.
(Province of Alessandria) Alessandria Province	3,558.83	Province of Italy.
Lake Peipus	3,555	Lake in Europe between Estonia and Russia.
(Thailand) Rayong Province	3,552	Province of Thailand.
(Philippines) Agusan del Norte	3,546.86	Province of the Philippines; includes the independent city of Butuan.
(Vietnam) Thái Nguyên Province	3,546.60	Province of Vietnam.
(England) Kent	3,543	Administrative county of England.
(Greenland) Traill Island	3,542	Island part of Greenland.
(Turkey) Iğdır Province	3,539	Province of Turkey.
(Vietnam) An Giang Province	3,536.80	Province of Vietnam.
(Bulgaria) Smolyan Province	3,532	Province of Bulgaria.
(Lesotho) Mohale's Hoek	3,530	District of Lesotho.
(Vietnam) Phú Thọ Province	3,528.40	Province of Vietnam.
(Romania) Giurgiu County	3,526	Second smallest county of Romania.
(France) Haut-Rhin	3,525	Department of France.
(Serbia) Pčinja	3,520	District of Serbia.
(Philippines) Misamis Oriental	3,515.70	Province of the Philippines; includes the independent city of Cagayan de Oro.
(Portugal) Leiria	3,515	District of Portugal.
Florence Province	3,514	Province of Italy.
Tottori	3,507.05	Prefecture of Japan.
(Serbia) Bor	3,507	District of Serbia.
(Philippines) Ilocos Norte	3,504.30	Province of the Philippines.
Bear Island	3,500	Island part of Antarctica.
(Oman) Muscat Governorate	3,500	Second smallest governorate of Oman.
(Jordan) Karak	3,495	Governorate of Jordan.
(Nicaragua) Nueva Segovia	3,491	Region of Nicaragua.
(Philippines) Quirino	3,486.16	Province of the Philippines.
(Serbia) Srem	3,486	District of Serbia.
(Turkey) Zonguldak Province	3,481	Province of Turkey.
(Nigeria) Lagos State	3,475	Smallest state of Nigeria.
(Egypt) Dakahlia Governorate	3,471	Governorate of Egypt.
(England) Essex	3,469	Administrative county of England.
(Nicaragua) Managua	3,465	Region of Nicaragua.
(England) Somerset	3,451	Administrative county of England.
County Clare	3,450	County in the Munster province of the Republic of Ireland.
Parma Province	3,449	Province of Italy.
Matera Province	3,447	Province of Italy.
(The Bahamas) North Andros Island	3,439	Largest island of The Bahamas.
(Egypt) Kafr el-Sheikh Governorate	3,437	Governorate of Egypt.
(Philippines) Davao del Norte	3,426.97	Province of the Philippines.
(Philippines) Tawi-Tawi	3,426.55	Province of the Philippines.
(Thailand) Phang Nga Province	3,425	Province of Thailand.
Overijssel	3,421	Province of The Netherlands
Viljandi County	3,420	County of Estonia.
(Malawi) Karonga	3,416	District of Malawi.
(Colombia) Atlántico Department	3,388	District of Colombia.
(Guinea-Bissau) Tombali	3,376.5	Region of Guinea-Bissau.
(Vietnam) Đồng Tháp Province	3,376.40	Province of Vietnam.
(Bulgaria) Shumen Province	3,365	Province of Bulgaria.
(Vietnam) Ninh Thuận Province	3,363.10	Province of Vietnam.
Northern Cyprus	3,355	De facto state compromising the Northern third of the island of Cyprus.
Uvs Lake	3,355	Lake in Mongolia.
Tartu County	3,349	County of Estonia.
(Latvia) Madona district	3,346	Second largest district of Latvia.
(Algeria) El Tarf Province	3,339	Province of Algeria.
(Hungary) Vas County	3,336	Third smallest county of Hungary.
(Russia) Vaygach Island	3,329	Island part of Russia.
(Turkey) Osmaniye Province	3,320	Province of Turkey.
(Czech Republic) Karlovy Vary Region	3,314.46	Second smallest region of the Czech Republic.
(New Zealand) Dunedin	3,314	Largest city (by area) in New Zealand.
(Vietnam) Sóc Trăng Province	3,312.30	Province of Vietnam.
(Serbia) Kosovo	3,310	District of Serbia that is ruled by the de facto state of the Republic of Kosovo.
(Qatar) Al-Shahaniya	3,309	Largest municipality of Qatar.
South Holland	3,308	Province of The Netherlands
(Thailand) Ranong Province	3,298	Province of Thailand.
(Mongolia) Darkhan-Uul	3,280	Second smallest aimag of Mongolia.
(Albania) Elbasan County	3,278	Third largest county of Albania.
(Rwanda) Northern Province	3,276	Province of Rwanda.
County Tyrone	3,270	Largest county in Northern Ireland, second largest county in the province of Ulster.
(Algeria) Béjaïa Province	3,268	Province of Algeria.
(Serbia) Mačva	3,268	District of Serbia.
(Philippines) Masbate Island	3,268	Island of the Philippines.
(Sicily) Messina Province	3,266.12	Province of Italy.
(Benin) Plateau Department	3,264	Department of Benin.
Aosta Valley	3,263	Smallest region of Italy.
(Serbia) Central Banat	3,256	District of Serbia.
(Ecuador) Bolívar Province	3,254	Second smallest province of Ecuador.
(Malawi) Ntcheu	3,251	District of Malawi.
(France) Rhône	3,249	Department of France.
Frosinone Province	3,247	Province of Italy.
(England) Wiltshire	3,246	Administrative county of England.
(Russia) Iturup	3,238	Largest island of the Kuril Islands, part of Russia.
Arezzo Province	3,233	Province of Italy.
(Benin) Atlantique Department	3,233	Department of Benin.
Windward Islands	3,232.5	Subsection of islands in the Lesser Antilles.
(Philippines) Kalinga	3,231.25	Province of the Philippines.
(Guatemala) Jutiapa	3,219	Department of Guatemala.
Vaud	3,212	Canton of Switzerland.
Lake Poyang	3,210	Lake in China.
(Honduras) Copán	3,203	Department of Honduras.
Micronesia	3,201	An island chain subdivision of Oceania.
Lake Tana	3,200	Lake in Ethiopia.
(England) Shropshire	3,197	Administrative county of England.
Sondrio Province	3,195.76	Province of Italy.
(Solomon Islands) Makira-Ulawa	3,188	Province of the Solomon Islands.
(Indonesia) Yogyakarta Special Region	3,186	Second smallest province of Indonesia.
(Sweden) Gotland	3,183.7	Province, county, municipality and diocese of Sweden.
Reggio Calabria Province	3,183	Province of Italy.
(Canada) Mansel Island	3,180	Island in the Arctic Archipelago.
(Czech Republic) Liberec Region	3,162.93	Smallest region of the Czech Republic.
(Thailand) Amnat Charoen Province	3,161	Province of Thailand.
(Algeria) Tissemsilt Province	3,152	Province of Algeria.
(Philippines) Aurora	3,147.32	Province of the Philippines.
Rhode Island	3,144	State of the United States.
(Sweden) Gotland County	3,140	Second smallest county of Sweden.
(Guinea-Bissau) Quinara	3,138.4	Region of Guinea-Bissau.
(Scotland) Eilean Siar	3,134	Island area of Scotland.
(Malawi) Mchinji	3,131	District of Malawi.
(Costa Rica) Cartago Province	3,125	Second smallest province of Costa Rica.
West Flanders	3,125	Province of Flanders, Belgium.
(Guatemala) Baja Verapaz	3,124	Department of Guatemala.
(Philippines) Batangas	3,119.72	Province of the Philippines.
Amadjuak Lake	3,115	Lake in Canada.
Verona Province	3,109	Province of Italy.
(Haiti) Grand'Anse	3,100	Department of Haiti.
(Indonesia) Yamdena	3,100	Island part of Indonesia.
(Denmark) Funen	3,099.7	Island part of Denmark.
County Antrim	3,086	Second largest county in Northern Ireland, third largest county in the province of Ulster.
(Malawi) Dowa	3,077	District of Malawi.
(Honduras) Intibucá	3,072	Department of Honduras.
(Bulgaria) Vidin Province	3,071	Province of Bulgaria.
Lake Melville	3,069	Lake in Canada.
(England) Cambridgeshire	3,067	Administrative county of England.
(Latvia) Cēsis district	3,067	Third largest district of Latvia.
(Indonesia) Waigeo	3,060	Island part of Indonesia.
(Croatia) City of Zagreb	3,060	County of Croatia.
(Latvia) Riga district	3,059	District of Latvia.
(Cuba) Ciudad de La Habana Province	3,053.49	Second smallest province of Cuba.
(Sicily) Agrigento Province	3,042	Province of Italy.
(Bulgaria) Kyustendil Province	3,027	Province of Bulgaria.
(Bhutan) Lhuntse	3,022	Third largest district of Bhutan.
(Serbia) Moravica	3,016	District of Serbia.
(Dominican Republic) La Altagracia	3,010.34	Second largest province of the Dominican Republic.
Maui County	3,010	County of Hawaii.
(Canada) Akimiski Island	3,001	Island in the Arctic Archipelago.
Lake Bangweulu	3,000	Lake in Zambia.
(Latvia) Jēkabpils district	2,998	District of Latvia.
East Flanders	2,991	Province of Flanders, Belgium.
Oristano Province	2,990	Province of Italy.
(Croatia) Šibenik-Knin	2,984	County of Croatia.
Ida-Viru County	2,972	County of Estonia.
(Solomon Islands) Choiseul Island	2,971	Island of the Solomon Islands.
(Cambodia) Svay Rieng Province	2,966	Smallest province of Cambodia.
Pavia Province	2,965	Province of Italy.
(Algeria) Tizi Ouzou Province	2,958	Province of Algeria.
Groningen	2,955	Province of The Netherlands
(Guatemala) Santa Rosa	2,955	Department of Guatemala.
Kaohsiung	2,951.85	Special municipality of Taiwan.
(Sweden) Blekinge County	2,941	Smallest county of Sweden.
Saare County	2,938	County of Estonia.
Zeeland	2,933	Province of The Netherlands
Campobasso Province	2,925	Province of Italy.
(Lesotho) Quthing	2,916	District of Lesotho.
Adjara	2,899	Autonomous republic of Georgia.
(England) Lancashire	2,897	Administrative county of England.
(Canada) Belcher Islands	2,896	Archipelago of Canada.
(Ecuador) Tungurahua Province	2,896	Smallest province of Ecuador.
(The Gambia) Central River Division	2,895	Largest division of the Gambia.
(Albania) Gjirokastër County	2,883	County of Albania.
(Burkina Faso) Centre	2,869	Region of Burkina Faso.
Antwerp	2,867	Province of Flanders, Belgium.
(Bulgaria) Silistra Province	2,862	Province of Bulgaria.
(Dominican Republic) Santiago	2,837	Third largest province of the Dominican Republic.
French West Indies	2,831.4	Islands in the Caribbean under French sovereignty—Guadeloupe (Basse-Terre, Grande-Terre, Les Saintes, Marie-Galante, and La Désirade), Martinique, Saint Martin and Saint Barthélemy.
Samoa	2,831	Country in Oceania.
(Bhutan) Bumthang	2,831	District of Bhutan.
(Lesotho) Leribe	2,828	District of Lesotho.
(Philippines) Benguet	2,826.59	Province of the Philippines; includes the independent city of Baguio.
(Thailand) Trat Province	2,819	Province of Thailand.
(Croatia) Istria	2,813	County of Croatia.
(Latvia) Rēzekne district	2,812	District of Latvia.
Ticino	2,812	Canton of Switzerland.
(Portugal) Aveiro	2,808	District of Portugal.
Avellino Province	2,806	Province of Italy.
(Portugal) Lisbon	2,800	District of Portugal.
Lecce Province	2,799	Province of Italy.
Medina	2,798	Second-level administrative province of Colombia within the department of Cundinamarca
(Marche) Macerata Province	2,779.34	Province of Italy.
(Vanuatu) Malampa Province	2,779	Second largest province of Vanuatu.
(Philippines) Bulacan	2,774.85	Province of the Philippines.
Võru County	2,773	County of Estonia.
(Serbia) Jablanica	2,769	District of Serbia.
Rapla County	2,765	County of Estonia.
(Serbia) Pirot	2,761	District of Serbia.
County Limerick	2,756	Eighth largest county of the Republic of Ireland, located in the province of Munster.
Bergamo Province	2,754.91	Province of Italy.
(Alaska) Revillagigedo Island	2,754.835	Island part of the U.S. state of Alaska.
(Armenia) Aragatsotn Province	2,753	Province of Armenia.
Guavio	2,753	Second-level administrative province of Colombia within the department of Cundinamarca.
(Latvia) Talsi district	2,751	District of Latvia.
Rieti Province	2,749.16	Province of Italy.
(Philippines) Tarlac	2,736.64	Province of the Philippines.
(Bulgaria) Targovishte Province	2,735	Province of Bulgaria.
(Philippines) Antique	2,729.17	Province of the Philippines.
(Serbia) Nišava	2,729	District of Serbia.
(Brunei) Belait	2,727	District of Brunei.
Vicenza Province	2,722.53	Province of Italy.
(Alaska) Unalaska Island	2,720	Island part of the Aleutian Islands.
Nicosia	2,710	Distrit of Cyprus, partially ruled by the de facto state of Northern Cyprus.
(Albania) Vlorë County	2,706	County of Albania.
(Armenia) Tavush Province	2,704	Province of Armenia.
Tonlé Sap	2,700	Lake in Cambodia, during dry seasons of the year.
(Vietnam) Bình Dương Province	2,696.20	Province of Vietnam.
(Guatemala) Zacapa	2,690	Department of Guatemala.
Modena Province	2,688	Province of Italy.
(Armenia) Shirak Province	2,681	Province of Armenia.
Drenthe	2,680	Province of The Netherlands
(Egypt) Alexandria Governorate	2,679	Governorate of Egypt.
Järva County	2,674	County of Estonia.
(Portugal) Braga	2,673	District of Portugal.
(Estonia) Saaremaa	2,673	Island part of Estonia.
(Serbia) Rasina	2,667	District of Serbia.
(Costa Rica) Heredia Province	2,657	Smallest province of Costa Rica.
(England) Gloucestershire	2,654	Administrative county of England.
Caserta Province	2,651	Province of Italy.
(Bulgaria) Razgrad Province	2,648	Province of Bulgaria.
(Croatia) Bjelovar-Bilogora County	2,640	County of Croatia.
(Dominican Republic) Monte Plata	2,632	Province of the Dominican Republic.
Ferrara Province	2,631	Province of Italy.
(Philippines) Ifugao	2,628.21	Province of the Philippines.
(Guinea-Bissau) Bolama	2,624.4	Region of Guinea-Bissau.
(England) Staffordshire	2,623	Administrative county of England.
(Liberia) Margibi	2,616	County of Liberia.
(Bulgaria) Ruse Province	2,616	Province of Bulgaria.
(Serbia) Pomoravlje	2,614	District of Serbia.
(Canada) Moresby Island	2,608	Island in the Haida Gwaii archipelago, part of Canada.
(England) Oxfordshire	2,603	Administrative county of England.
(Haiti) Sud	2,602	Department of Haiti.
(Latvia) Limbaži district	2,602	District of Latvia.
Vorarlberg	2,601	Second smallest state of Austria.
(Ukraine) Chernobyl Nuclear Power Plant Zone of Alienation	2,600	An exclusion zone established by the Soviet Union in 1986 shortly after the Chernobyl Disaster.
Chieti Province	2,599.58	Province of Italy.
(Philippines) Ilocos Sur	2,595.96	Province of the Philippines.
James Ross Island	2,598	Island part of Antarctica.
(Philippines) Capiz	2,594.64	Province of the Philippines.
(Ghana) Greater Accra Region	2,593	Smallest region of Ghana.
Sharjah	2,590	Emirate of the United Arab Emirates.
Luxembourg	2,586	Country in Europe.
Piacenza Province	2,585.86	Province of Italy.
(Vietnam) Bạc Liêu Province	2,584.10	Province of Vietnam.
(Algeria) Jijel Province	2,577	Province of Algeria.
(Qatar) Al Wakrah	2,577	Second largest municipality of Qatar.
Charcot Island	2,576	Island part of Antarctica.
(Sicily) Enna Province	2,575	Province of Italy.
Saarland	2,569	Smallest non-city state of Germany.
Capital Region of Denmark	2,568.29	Smallest region of Denmark.
Pesaro and Urbino	2,567.78	Province of Italy.
(Philippines) Albay	2,565.77	Province of the Philippines.
(Latvia) Aizkraukle district	2,565	District of Latvia.
(Thailand) Phrae Province	2,557	Province of Thailand.
(England) Derbyshire	2,550	Administrative county of England.
County Roscommon	2,548	County in the Republic of Ireland, third largest in the province of Connacht.
(Wales) Gwynedd	2,548	Second largest unitary authority of Wales.
(Hungary) Nógrád	2,546	Second smallest county of Hungary.
Jõgeva County	2,545	County of Estonia.
(Indonesia) Obira	2,542	Island part of Indonesia.
(England) Dorset	2,541	Administrative county of England.
(Dominican Republic) Azua	2,532	Province of the Dominican Republic.
(Latvia) Daugavpils district	2,525	District of Latvia.
Moscow	2,511	Federal subject of Russia, area after its expansion on June 1, 2012.
Réunion	2,510	Department of France.
(Guatemala) Suchitepéquez	2,510	Department of Guatemala.
(Albania) Dibër County	2,507	County of Albania.
(Latvia) Kuldīga district	2,502	District of Latvia.
County Down	2,489	Third largest county in Northern Ireland, in the province of Ulster.
(Vietnam) Tiền Giang Province	2,484.20	Province of Vietnam.
Treviso Province	2,479.83	Province of Italy.
(Thailand) Satun Province	2,479	Province of Thailand.
(Serbia) Kolubara	2,474	District of Serbia.
(Chile) Navarino Island	2,473	Island part of Chile.
(Latvia) Ventspils district	2,472	District of Latvia.
(Russia) Paramushir	2,471	Second-largest island of the Kuril Islands, part of Russia.
(Thailand) Chachoengsao Province	2,470	Province of Thailand.
(Kosovo) Pristina	2,470	District of Kosovo.
Venice Province	2,467	Province of Italy.
(Burundi) Bururi Province	2,465	Largest province of Burundi.
(Paraguay) Central Department	2,465	Second smallest department of Paraguay.
(Scotland) Northern Isles	2,464	Pair of archipelagoes part of Scotland, consists or Orkney and Shetland.
Trapani Province	2,460	Province of Italy.
Ross Island	2,460	Island part of Antarctica.
(Serbia) Peć	2,459	District of Serbia.
(Croatia) Vukovar-Srijem	2,454	County of Croatia.
(Qatar) Al Rayyan	2,450	Third largest municipality of Qatar.
Pisa Province	2,448	Province of Italy.
(Latvia) Tukums district	2,447	District of Latvia.
Saga	2,440.68	Prefecture of Japan.
Taranto Province	2,437	Province of Italy.
(Latvia) Valka district	2,437	District of Latvia.
(Greenland) Ymer Island	2,437	Island part of Greenland.
Anvers Island	2,432	Island part of Antarctica.
(Serbia) West Bačka	2,420	District of Serbia.
Leeward Antilles	2,418	Subsection of islands in the Lesser Antilles.
(Angola) Luanda Province	2,418	Smallest province of Angola.
Kanagawa	2,415.83	Prefecture of Japan.
(England) East Riding of Yorkshire	2,415	Unitary authority of England.
Limburg	2,414	Province of Flanders, Belgium.
Zeeland	2,412	Province of The Netherlands
(Latvia) Ludza district	2,412	District of Latvia.
(Indonesia) Peleng	2,406	Island part of Indonesia.
(Malawi) Zomba	2,405	District of Malawi.
(Russia) Karaginsky Island	2,404	Island part of Russia.
(Benin) Kouffo Department	2,404	Department of Benin.
(Djibouti) Ali Sabieh Region	2,400	Region of Djibouti.
(Wales) Carmarthenshire	2,398	Third largest unitary authority of Wales.
(Portugal) Porto	2,395	District of Portugal.
(Panama) Kuna Yala	2,393	Province of Panama.
Catanzaro Province	2,391	Province of Italy.
Litchfield County	2,390	County of Connecticut.
(Serbia) Šumadija	2,387	District of Serbia.
(Latvia) Balvi district	2,386	District of Latvia.
(Algeria) Aïn Témouchent Province	2,379	Province of Algeria.
Forlì-Cesena Province	2,378	Province of Italy.
(Bulgaria) Pernik Province	2,377	Third smallest province of Bulgaria.
(Guatemala) Chiquimula	2,376	Department of Guatemala.
(Albania) Kukës County	2,373	County of Albania.
County Wexford	2,367	County in the Republic of Ireland, largest in the province of Leinster.
(England) Northamptonshire	2,367	Administrative county of England.
(Latvia) Valmiera district	2,365	District of Latvia.
(Bhutan) Sarpang	2,362	District of Bhutan.
(Vietnam) Bến Tre Province	2,360.20	Province of Vietnam.
(Australia) Australian Capital Territory	2,358	Territory of Australia.
(Canada) Cornwall Island	2,358	Island part of the Arctic Archipelago.
(Lesotho) Qacha's Nek	2,349	District of Lesotho.
Azores	2,346	Autonomous Region of Portugal.
County Meath	2,342	County in the Republic of Ireland, second largest in the province of Leinster.
(Panama) Herrera Province	2,341	Third smallest province of Panama.
Mantua Province	2,339	Province of Italy.
(Burundi) Ruyigi Province	2,339	Second largest province of Burundi.
(Honduras) La Paz	2,331	Department of Honduras.
(Yemen) Al Mahwit Governorate	2,330	Second smallest governorate of Yemen.
(Serbia) North Banat	2,329	District of Serbia.
(Australia) Groote Eylandt	2,326.1	Island part of Australia.
(Philippines) Camarines Norte	2,320.07	Province of the Philippines.
(Panama) Kuna de Madugandí	2,319	Second smallest province of Panama.
(Bhutan) Trashigang	2,316	District of Bhutan.
(Bhutan) Samdrup Jongkhar	2,312	District of Bhutan.
(Armenia) Vayots Dzor Province	2,308	Province of Armenia.
(Greece) Ionian Islands	2,307	Smallest periphery of Greece.
(Syria) Latakia	2,297	Governorate of Syria.
(Liberia) Maryland	2,297	Third smallest county of Liberia.
(Vietnam) Trà Vinh Province	2,295.10	Province of Vietnam.
Reggio Emilia Province	2,291.26	Province of Italy.
Eastern Cundinamarca	2,287	Second-level administrative province of Colombia within the department of Cundinamarca
(Dominican Republic) La Vega	2,287	Province of the Dominican Republic.
(Latvia) Krāslava district	2,285	District of Latvia.
(France) Yvelines	2,284	Department of France.
Okinawa	2,281.12	Prefecture of Japan.
(Indonesia) Yapen	2,278	Island part of Indonesia.
Pordenone Province	2,273	Province of Italy.
(Indonesia) Morotai Island	2,266	Island part of Indonesia.
(Hungary) Komárom-Esztergom	2,265	Smallest county of Hungary.
(Brazil) Outer Caviana	2,257	Island part of Brazil.
(The Gambia) North Bank Division	2,256	Second largest division of the Gambia.
Verbano-Cusio-Ossola Province	2,255	Province of Italy.
(Portugal) Viana do Castelo	2,255	District of Portugal.
Latina Province	2,251	Province of Italy.
(Canada) Princess Royal Island	2,251	Island part of Canada.
(Latvia) Alūksne district	2,243	District of Latvia.
(Scotland) Moray	2,238	Unitary district of Scotland.
(Cuba) Isla de la Juventud	2,237	Second-largest island of Cuba.
Comoros	2,235	Country in Listed figure includes Mayotte (373 km^{2}). The figure without Mayotte is 1,862 km^{2}.
(England) Durham	2,233	Administrative county of England.
(Serbia) Toplica	2,231	District of Serbia.
(Nicaragua) Estelí	2,230	Region of Nicaragua.
(Lesotho) Berea	2,222	District of Lesotho.
Taichung	2,214.89	Special municipality of Taiwan.
(Jordan) Tafilah	2,209	Governorate of Jordan.
(Norway) Hinnøya	2,204.7	Island part of Norway.
(Russia) Wilczek Land	2,203	Largest island of Franz Josef Land, part of Russia.
(Philippines) Basilan	2,217.13	Province of the Philippines.
(Norway) Vestfold	2,216	County of Norway.
Limburg	2,210	Province of The Netherlands
(Cuba) Isla de la Juventud	2,199	Smallest province of Cuba.
(Vietnam) Hà Tây Province	2,198	Province of Vietnam.
(Serbia) Prizren	2,196	District of Serbia that is ruled by the de facto state of the Republic of Kosovo.
(Scotland) Stirling	2,196	Unitary district of Scotland.
Tainan	2,191.65	Special municipality of Taiwan.
Tokyo	2,190.93	Third smallest prefecture of Japan.
(Algeria) Constantine Province	2,187	Province of Algeria.
(Alaska) Nelson Island	2,183	Island part of the U.S. state of Alaska.
(Latvia) Saldus district	2,182	District of Latvia.
(Scotland) Angus	2,181	Unitary district of Scotland.
(Scotland) Lewis and Harris	2,178.98	Island part of Scotland.
(Algeria) Mostaganem Province	2,175	Province of Algeria.
(Haiti) Nord	2,175	Department of Haiti.
(Thailand) Nakhon Nayok Province	2,168	Province of Thailand.
(Algeria) Tipaza Province	2,166	Province of Algeria.
(Canada) Richards Island	2,165	Island in the Arctic Archipelago.
(Nicaragua) Rivas	2,162	Region of Nicaragua.
(Philippines) Mountain Province	2,157.38	Province of the Philippines.
(Malawi) Salima	2,151	District of Malawi.
(Indonesia) Trangan	2,149	Island part of Indonesia.
Padua Province	2,144.15	Province of Italy.
(Malawi) Balaka	2,142	District of Malawi.
(Turkey) Bartın Province	2,140	Province of Turkey.
(Philippines) Sulu	2,135.25	Province of the Philippines.
(El Salvador) Usulután	2,130	Largest department of El Salvador.
Caltanissetta Province	2,128	Province of Italy.
Guatemala	2,126	Department of Guatemala.
(Bhutan) Zhemgang	2,126	District of Bhutan.
Syracuse Province	2,124	Province of Italy.
Terni Province	2,122	Province of Italy.
(Thailand) Mukdahan Province	2,122	Province of Thailand.
(Algeria) Oran Province	2,121	Province of Algeria.
(Indonesia) Alor Island	2,120	Island part of Indonesia.
(Philippines) Sorsogon	2,119.01	Province of the Philippines.
(Lesotho) Mafeteng	2,119	District of Lesotho.
County Londonderry	2,118	County in the Ulster province of Northern Ireland.
(North Korea) P'yŏngyang-si	2,113	Special city of North Korea.
Flemish Brabant	2,106	Province of Flanders, Belgium.
(Papua New Guinea) Manus Province	2,100	Smallest province of Papua New Guinea.
(Colombia) Margarita Island	2,100	Island part of Colombia.
(Vietnam) Ho Chi Minh City (municipality)	2,098.70	Province of Vietnam.
(Armenia) Ararat Province	2,096	Third smallest province of Armenia.
(Haiti) Nord-Ouest	2,094	Department of Haiti.
(Armenia) Kotayk Province	2,089	Second smallest province of Armenia.
Vercelli Province	2,088	Province of Italy.
(England) Nottinghamshire	2,085	Administrative county of England.
(England) Leicestershire	2,083	Administrative county of England.
(England) Cheshire	2,081	Administrative county of England.
Benevento Province	2,080	Province of Italy.
(Dominican Republic) Pedernales	2,078	Province of the Dominican Republic.
(El Salvador) San Miguel	2,077	Second largest department of El Salvador.
(Kosovo) Mitrovica	2,077	District of Kosovo.
(Haiti) Sud-Est	2,077	Third smallest department of Haiti.
(El Salvador) La Unión	2,074	Third largest department of El Salvador.
County Kilkenny	2,073	County in the Republic of Ireland, third largest in the province of Leinster.
Kent County	2,072	County of Delaware.
(The Gambia) Upper River Division	2,070	Division of the Gambia.
(Bhutan) Thimphu	2,067	District of Bhutan.
(Montenegro) Nikšić	2,065	Municipality of Montenegro.
(England) Worcestershire	2,065	Administrative county of England.
(Guatemala) Jalapa	2,063	Department of Guatemala.
Bir Tawil	2,060	Unclaimed land between Egypt and Sudan.
(Indonesia) Laut Island	2,057	Island part of Indonesia.
(Philippines) Misamis Occidental	2,055.22	Province of the Philippines.
(Bulgaria) Gabrovo Province	2,053	Second smallest province of Bulgaria.
(Serbia) Kosovska Mitrovica	2,053	District of Serbia that is ruled by the de facto state of the Republic of Kosovo.
New Taipei	2,052.57	Special municipality of Taiwan.
(Philippines) Pampanga	2,044.99	Province of the Philippines; includes the independent city of Angeles.
(Latvia) Preiļi district	2,041	District of Latvia.
(Vanuatu) Malakula Island	2,041	Second-largest island of Vanuatu.
Mauritius	2,040	Country in Africa. Includes Agaléga Islands, Cargados Carajos Shoals (Saint Brandon), and Rodrigues.
(Solomon Islands) New Georgia	2,037	Island part of the Solomon Islands.
(Canary Islands) Tenerife	2,034.38	Largest island of the Canary Islands, part of Spain.
(Indonesia) Misool	2,034	Island part of Indonesia.
(Georgia (country)) Guria	2,033	Smallest region of Georgia.
(Croatia) Brod-Posavina	2,030	County of Croatia.
County Wicklow	2,027	County in the Leinster province of the Republic of Ireland.
Canton of St. Gallen	2,026	Canton of Switzerland.
(Malawi) Blantyre	2,025	District of Malawi.
(Chile) Magdalena Island	2,025	Island part of Chile.
(Croatia) Virovitica-Podravina	2,024	County of Croatia.
(El Salvador) San Vicente	2,023	Department of El Salvador.
(Canada) René-Levasseur Island	2,020	Island part of Canada, world's largest artificial island.
(Equatorial Guinea) Bioko	2,017	Island part of Equatorial Guinea.
(El Salvador) Chalatenango	2,017	Department of El Salvador.
(Jamaica) Surrey County Parish	2,009.3	Parish of Jamaica.
(The Bahamas) Abaco Islands	2,009	Archipelago part of the Bahamas.
(Dominican Republic) Independencia	2,006	Province of the Dominican Republic.
(Malawi) Mulanje	2,005	District of Malawi.
County Offaly	2,001	County in the Leinster province of the Republic of Ireland.
(Russia) Ayon Island	2,000	Island part of Russia.
(Vietnam) Bà Rịa–Vũng Tàu province	1,989.60	Province of Vietnam.
(England) West Sussex	1,988	Administrative county of England.
Famagusta	1,985.3	Distrit of Cyprus, partially ruled by the de facto state of Northern Cyprus.
(Guatemala) Chimaltenango	1,979	Department of Guatemala.
(Burundi) Gitega Province	1,979	Third largest province of Burundi.
(England) Warwickshire	1,978	Administrative county of England.
(Philippines) Surigao del Norte	1,972.93	Province of the Philippines.
(Burundi) Cankuzo Province	1,965	Province of Burundi.
(Burundi) Makamba Province	1,960	Province of Burundi.
(Burundi) Rutana Province	1,959	Province of Burundi.
(Guatemala) Quetzaltenango	1,951	Department of Guatemala.
Teramo Province	1,948	Province of Italy.
(Bhutan) Mongar	1,946	District of Bhutan.
(Malawi) Nsanje	1,945	District of Malawi.
(Liberia) Bomi	1,942	Second smallest county of Liberia.
(Egypt) Gharbia Governorate	1,942	Governorate of Egypt.
Ancona Province	1,940	Province of Italy.
(Thailand) Pathum Thani Province	1,940	Province of Thailand.
(Alaska) Kuiu Island	1,936.16	Island part of the U.S. state of alaska.
County Cavan	1,932	County in the Ulster province of the Republic of Ireland.
(Dominican Republic) Monte Cristi	1,924	Province of the Dominican Republic.
(Guatemala) El Progreso	1,922	Department of Guatemala.
Valga County	1,917	County of Estonia.
United States Virgin Islands	1,910	Territory of the United States.
(Liberia) Montserrado	1,909	Smallest county of Liberia.
Osaka	1,905.14	Second smallest prefecture of Japan.
(Indonesia) Biak	1,904	Island part of Indonesia.
Hartford County	1,900	County in Connecticut.
(Indonesia) Bacan	1,899.8	Island part of Indonesia.
(Syria) Tartus	1,896	Third smallest governorate of Syria.
Lower Magdalena	1,894	Second-level administrative province of Colombia within the department of Cundinamarca
(Albania) Fier County	1,887	County of Albania.
(Slovakia) Žitný ostrov	1,886	Island part of Slovakia.
(Hawaii) Maui	1,883	Second-largest island of the U.S. state of Hawaii.
(Latvia) Bauska district	1,882	District of Latvia.
(Timor-Leste) Viqueque	1,880.4	Municipality of East Timor.
(Latvia) Gulbene district	1,877	District of Latvia.
Kagawa	1,876.72	Smallest prefecture of Japan.
(Syria) Quneitra	1,861	Second smallest governorate of Syria.
Mauritius (main island)	1,860	Main island of Mauritius.
Ravenna Province	1,858	Province of Italy.
(England) Herefordshire	1,858	Unitary authority of England.
County Waterford	1,858	County in the Munster province of the Republic of Ireland.
(Guatemala) Retalhuleu	1,856	Department of Guatemala.
(Dominican Republic) Puerto Plata	1,853	Province of the Dominican Republic.
(Egypt) Qena Governorate	1,851	Governorate of Egypt.
(South Korea) Jeju Special Self-Governing Province	1,846	Province of South Korea.
(Colombia) Quindío Department	1,845	District of Colombia.
Kokang	1,844.1	Self-administered zone in Myanmar.
(China) Ninghai	1,843	County in Zhejiang province.
(Afghanistan) Kapisa Province	1,842	Smallest province of Afghanistan.
(Australia) Fraser Island	1,840	Island part of Australia (world's largest sand island).
(Latvia) Ogre district	1,840	Third smallest district of Latvia.
County Westmeath	1,840	County in the Leinster province of the Republic of Ireland.
Genoa Province	1,839	Province of Italy.
Brindisi Province	1,839	Province of Italy.
County Sligo	1,838	County in the Connacht province of the Republic of Ireland.
(Burundi) Muyinga Province	1,836	Province of Burundi.
(Egypt) Faiyum Governorate	1,827	Governorate of Egypt.
(South Korea) Jeju Island	1,826	Island part of South Korea.
(Philippines) Laguna	1,823.55	Province of the Philippines.
(Croatia) Požega-Slavonia	1,823	County of Croatia.
Põlva County	1,823	Third smallest county of Estonia.
(Philippines) Aklan	1,821.42	Province of the Philippines.
Lääne County	1,816	Second smallest county of Estonia.
(New Zealand) Stewart Island	1,815	Island part of New Zealand.
(Timor-Leste) Lautém	1,813.1	Municipality of East Timor.
(Alaska) Afognak	1,812.58	Island part of the U.S. state of Alaska.
(Russia) Bely Island	1,810	Island part of Russia.
(Bhutan) Trongsa	1,807	District of Bhutan.
(France) Essonne	1,804	Department of France.
(Albania) Berat County	1,802	County of Albania.
(Djibouti) Arta Region	1,800	Second smallest region of Djibouti.
(Oman) Musandam Governorate	1,800	Smallest governorate of Oman.
New Zealand outlying islands	1,800	Nine island groups part of New Zealand, but located outside of the New Zealand continental shelf.
(Philippines) Southern Leyte	1,797.22	Province of the Philippines.
(Wales) Ceredigion	1,797	Unitary authority of Wales.
(Bhutan) Chukha	1,791	District of Bhutan.
Rovigo Province	1,789	Province of Italy.
(Dominican Republic) El Seibo	1,787	Province of the Dominican Republic.
(Timor-Leste) Manatuto	1,786	Municipality of East Timor.
(Serbia) North Bačka	1,784	District of Serbia.
(Croatia) Dubrovnik-Neretva	1,781	County of Croatia.
(Botswana) South-East District	1,780	Smallest district of Botswana.
(Alaska) Umnak	1,776.76	Island part of the U.S. state of Alaska.
Lucca Province	1,773	Province of Italy.
(Scotland) South Lanarkshire	1,771	Unitary district of Scotland.
Cremona Province	1,770	Province of Italy.
(Lesotho) Butha-Buthe	1,767	District of Lesotho.
(Russia) Bolshoy Shantar Island	1,766	Island part of Russia.
(Russia) Bolshoy Begichev Island	1,764	Island part of Russia.
(The Gambia) Western Division	1,764	Second smallest division of the Gambia.
(Indonesia) Simeulue	1,754	Island part of Indonesia.
(Croatia) Koprivnica-Križevci	1,748	County of Croatia.
(New Zealand) Stewart Island/Rakiura	1,746	Third largest island in New Zealand.
(Bhutan) Haa	1,746	District of Bhutan.
(Dominican Republic) Barahona	1,739	Province of the Dominican Republic.
Canton of Zürich	1,729	Canton of Switzerland.
(Indonesia) Kobroor	1,723	Island part of Indonesia.
(Canada) Air Force Island	1,720	Island part of the Arctic Archipelago.
County Laois	1,720	County in the Leinster province of the Republic of Ireland.
New London County	1,720	County of Connecticut.
(Indonesia) Natuna Besar	1,720	Island part of Indonesia.
Crotone Province	1,717	Province of Italy.
(Greenland) Geographical Society Island	1,717	Island part of Greenland.
(England) East Sussex	1,713	Administrative county of England.
(Malawi) Ntchisi	1,709	District of Malawi.
(Nicaragua) Madriz	1,708	Region of Nicaragua.
(Burundi) Kirundo Province	1,703	Province of Burundi.
(United Kingdom) Fermanagh	1,700	Largest district of Northern Ireland.
(Haiti) Nord-Est	1,698	Second smallest department of Haiti.
County Kildare	1,695	County in the Leinster province of the Republic of Ireland.
Savai'i	1,694	Largest island of Samoa.
(Australia) Bathurst Island	1,692	Island part of Australia.
County Fermanagh	1,691	County in Northern Ireland in the province of Ulster.
Ras al-Khaimah	1,684	Emirate of the United Arab Emirates.
(Honduras) Ocotepeque	1,680	Third smallest department of Honduras.
Canton of Fribourg	1,671	Canton of Switzerland.
(England) Surrey	1,670	Administrative county of England.
(Malawi) Thyolo	1,666	District of Malawi.
(Tanzania) Unguja	1,666	Island part of Tanzania.
(Russia) Bering Island	1,660	Island part of Russia.
(Canary Islands) Fuerteventura	1,660	Second-largest island of the Canary Islands.
(Scotland) Skye	1,656.25	Island part of Scotland.
(El Salvador) La Libertad	1,653	Department of El Salvador.
(Vietnam) Hải Dương Province	1,652.80	Province of Vietnam.
(Vietnam) Nam Định Province	1,650.80	Province of Vietnam.
Malacca	1,650	State of Malaysia.
(Bhutan) Trashiyangste	1,643	District of Bhutan.
(England) Hertfordshire	1,638	Administrative authority (county) of England.
(Burundi) Cibitoke Province	1,636	Province of Burundi.
(Finland) Soisalo	1,635	Island part of Finland.
(Latvia) Dobele district	1,633	Second smallest district of Latvia.
(Greece) Lesbos	1,632.8	Island part of Greece.
(Albania) Tirana County	1,631	Third smallest county of Albania.
(Vanuatu) Tafea Province	1,628	Province of Vanuatu.
Guadeloupe	1,628	French overseas département includes La Désirade, Marie Galante, Les Saintes, Saint-Barthélemy and Saint Martin (French part). Note that Saint-Barthélemy and Saint Martin became separate overseas collectivities in 2007 and are no longer politically part of Guadeloupe.
(Sicily) Ragusa Province	1,623.89	Province of Italy.
(Indonesia) Salawati	1,623	Island part of Indonesia.
Fairfield County	1,620	County of Connecticut.
(The Gambia) Lower River Division	1,618	Smallest division of the Gambia.
(Morocco) Grand Casablanca	1,615	Smallest region of Morocco.
(Qatar) Al Khor	1,613	Municipality of Qatar.
(Russia) Kunashir Island	1,612	Third-largest island of the Kuril Islands, part of Russia.
Joinville Island	1,607	Island part of Antarctica.
(Dominican Republic) Duarte	1,605	Province of the Dominican Republic.
(Benin) Mono Department	1,605	Department of Benin.
(Latvia) Jelgava district	1,604	Smallest district of Latvia.
(Indonesia) Tanahbesar	1,604	Island part of Indonesia.
(Vietnam) Hậu Giang Province	1,601.10	Province of Vietnam.
Kauai County	1,600	County of Hawaii.
(Indonesia) Rantau	1,597	Island part of Indonesia.
(Algeria) Boumerdès Province	1,591	Province of Algeria.
(Wales) Pembrokeshire	1,590	Unitary authority of Wales.
County Leitrim	1,588	County in the Connacht province of the Republic of Ireland.
(Colombia) Bogotá (Distrito Capital)	1,587	Capital district of Colombia; second smallest district of Colombia.
(Norway) Senja	1,586.3	Island part of Norway.
(Canada) Flaherty Island	1,585	Island in the Arctic Archipelago.
(Bhutan) Samtse	1,585	District of Bhutan.
(England) Greater London	1,583	Region of England.
(Hawaii) Oahu	1,583	Third-largest island of the U.S. state Hawaii.
(Romania) Ilfov County	1,583	Smallest county of Romania.
Åland	1,582.93	Autonomous region of Finland.
Petseri County	1,582	Former county of Estonia (1920–1944). Currently annexed by Russia.
Milan Province	1,575	Province of Italy.
(Jordan) Irbid	1,572	Governorate of Jordan.
New Haven County	1,570	County of Connecticut.
(England) Buckinghamshire	1,569	Administrative county of England.
(Thailand) Ayutthaya Province	1,569	Province of Thailand.
(Honduras) Valle	1,565	Second smallest department of Honduras.
(Malawi) Neno	1,561	District of Malawi.
(Canary Islands) Gran Canaria	1,560.1	Third-largest island of the Canary Islands, part of Spain.
Utrecht	1,560	Province of The Netherlands
Honolulu County	1,560	County of Hawaii.
(Russia) Graham Bell Island	1,557	Second-largest island of Franz Josef Land, part of Russia.
(Egypt) Sohag Governorate	1,547	Governorate of Egypt.
(Vietnam) Thái Bình Province	1,546.50	Province of Vietnam.
Cahul District	1,546	Largest district of Moldova.
Savona Province	1,545	Province of Italy.
(The Bahamas) Great Inagua	1,544	Second-largest island of the Bahamas.
(Apulia) Barletta-Andria-Trani Province	1,543	Province of Italy.
(Brazil) Mexiana	1,543	Island part of Brazil.
(Canada) Eglinton Island	1,541	Island in the Arctic Archipelago.
(India) Middle Andaman Island	1,536	Largest island of the Andaman and Nicobar Islands, part of India.
Isernia Province	1,535.24	Province of Italy.
(Greenland) Clavering Island	1,535	Island part of Greenland.
(Philippines) Romblon	1,533.45	Province of the Philippines.
(Egypt) Monufia Governorate	1,532	Governorate of Egypt.
(Russia) Pioneer Island	1,527	Island in Severnaya Zemlya, part of Russia.
(Thailand) Nonthaburi Province	1,526	Province of Thailand.
(Indonesia) Great Karimun	1,524	Island part of Indonesia.
(Philippines) Catanduanes	1,523	Island part of the Philippines.
(Vietnam) Hai Phong (municipality)	1,520.70	Province of Vietnam.
(Philippines) Cavite	1,512.41	Province of the Philippines.
(Timor-Leste) Baucau	1,508	Municipality of East Timor.
Asti Province	1,504	Province of Italy.
(Philippines) La Union	1,503.75	Province of the Philippines.
Vargas	1,496	State of Venezuela.
Canton of Lucerne	1,493	Canton of Switzerland.
(Philippines) Catanduanes	1,492.16	Province of the Philippines.
(Iran) Qeshm	1,491	Island part of Iran.
(Indonesia) Rupat	1,490	Island part of Indonesia.
Hîncești District	1,484	Second largest district of Moldova.
(India) Delhi	1,483	Union Territory of India.
(Vietnam) Vĩnh Long Province	1,479.10	Province of Vietnam.
Distrito Federal	1,479	District of Mexico.
(Algeria) Blida Province	1,478	Province of Algeria.
(Burundi) Ngozi Province	1,474	Province of Burundi.
(Greenland) Nares Land	1,466	Island part of Greenland.
(Greenland) Shannon Island	1,466	Island part of Greenland.
(Scotland) Shetland	1,466	Archipelago part of Scotland.
(Burundi) Karuzi Province	1,457	Province of Burundi.
(Hawaii) Kauai	1,456.4	Island part of the U.S. state of Hawaii.
(Vanuatu) Shefa Province	1,455	Province of Vanuatu.
(The Bahamas) South Andros Island	1,448	Third-largest island of the Bahamas.
(El Salvador) Morazán	1,447	Department of El Salvador.
(Egypt) Ismailia Governorate	1,442	Governorate of Egypt.
(Bangladesh) Bhola Island	1,441	Island part of Bangladesh.
(Montenegro) Podgorica	1,441	Municipality and capital of Montenegro.
(Algeria) Annaba Province	1,439	Province of Algeria.
Saint Petersburg	1,439	Smallest federal subject of Russia after June 1, 2012.
(Scotland) Shetland Islands	1,438	Island area of Scotland.
(Papua New Guinea) Fergusson Island	1,437	Island part of Papua New Guinea.
(Russia) Urup	1,436	Island part of Russia.
(Dominican Republic) Elías Piña	1,426	Province of the Dominican Republic.
(Japan) Okinawa Islands	1,418.59	Island group part of Japan.
(Brazil) São Luís Island	1,410	Island part of Brazil.
(Greece) Rhodes	1,400.684	Island part of Greece.
Aargau	1,404	Canton of Switzerland.
(Vietnam) Cần Thơ (municipality)	1,401.60	Province of Vietnam.
Faroe Islands	1,399	Self-governing territory of Denmark.
(Tanzania) Dar es Salaam	1,398	Region of Tanzania.
(Kosovo) Prizren	1,397	District of Kosovo.
(Cyprus) Limassol	1,393.3	Distrit of Cyprus.
(Vietnam) Ninh Bình Province	1,392.40	Province of Vietnam.
(Cyprus) Paphos	1,389.8	Distrit of Cyprus.
(Serbia) Kosovo-Pomoravlje	1,389	District of Serbia that is ruled by the de facto state of the Republic of Kosovo.
(Bhutan) Dagana	1,387	District of Bhutan.
King George Island	1,384	Largest island of the South Shetland Islands.
(Timor-Leste) Bobonaro	1,380.8	Municipality of East Timor.
(Canada) Graham Island	1,378	Island in the Arctic Archipelago.
(Fiji) Eastern	1,376	A division of Fiji.
(Canada) Pitt Island	1,375	Island part of Canada.
(Vietnam) Vĩnh Phúc Province	1,373.20	Province of Vietnam.
(The Bahamas) Grand Bahama	1,373	Island part of the Bahamas.
(Philippines) Bataan	1,372.98	Province of the Philippines.
(Canada) Nottingham Island	1,372	Island in the Arctic Archipelago.
(Australia) Flinders Island	1,367	Island part of Australia.
(Kosovo) Peja	1,365	District of Kosovo.
(Chile) Desolación Island	1,352	Island part of Chile.
(Myanmar) Ramree Island	1,350	Island part of Myanmar.
(Bulgaria) Sofia	1,349	Smallest province of Bulgaria.
(Montenegro) Pljevlja	1,346	Municipality of Montenegro.
(Sweden) Öland	1,342	Second smallest province of Sweden.
Novara Province	1,339	Province of Italy.
(Turkey) Kilis Province	1,338	Province of Turkey.
Windham County	1,330	County of Connecticut.
(Dominican Republic) Hato Mayor	1,329	Province of the Dominican Republic.
County Armagh	1,327	County in the Ulster province of Northern Ireland.
(Timor-Leste) Manufahi	1,326.6	Municipality of East Timor.
(Scotland) Fife	1,323	Unitary district of Scotland.
(Malawi) Phalombe	1,323	District of Malawi.
(Egypt) Beni Suef Governorate	1,322	Governorate of Egypt.
(Bhutan) Paro	1,310	District of Bhutan.
(North Korea) Kaesŏng-si	1,309	Special city of North Korea.
(Alaska) Bristol Bay Borough	1,308	Smallest borough of Alaska.
(Canada) Lougheed Island	1,308	Island part of the Arctic Archipelago.
(Brunei) Temburong	1,306	District of Brunei.
(Dominican Republic) Santo Domingo (Capital Province)	1,302	Province of the Dominican Republic.
(Eritrea) Central region	1,300	Region of Eritrea.
County Monaghan	1,295	County in the Ulster province of the Republic of Ireland.
Gualivá	1,293	Second-level administrative province of Colombia within the department of Cundinamarca
(Chile) Dawson Island	1,290	Island part of Chile.
(Norway) Barentsøya	1,288	Island part of Svalbard, Norway.
(Metropolitan City of Rome Capital) Rome	1,285	Largest municipality of the EU and Italy.
(Chad) N'Djamena	1,284	Region of Chad.
(Dominican Republic) Baoruco	1,282	Province of the Dominican Republic.
(Benin) Ouémé Department	1,281	Second smallest department of Benin.
Como Province	1,279	Province of Italy.
New Castle County	1,279	County of Delaware.
(Dominican Republic) María Trinidad Sánchez	1,272	Province of the Dominican Republic.
(Indonesia) Lembata	1,270	Island part of Indonesia.
(Dominican Republic) San Cristóbal	1,266	Province of the Dominican Republic.
(Philippines) Basilan	1,266	Island part of the Philippines.
(Croatia) Varaždin	1,262	County of Croatia.
Almeidas	1,259	Second-level administrative province of Colombia within the department of Cundinamarca
Mill Island	1,258	Island part of Antarctica.
(Vietnam) Da Nang (municipality)	1,257.30	Province of Vietnam.
(Dominican Republic) San Pedro de Macorís	1,255.46	Province of the Dominican Republic.
(Indonesia) Mangole Island	1,255.33	Island part of Indonesia.
(Scotland) East Ayrshire	1,252	Unitary district of Scotland.
(Senegal) Morfil	1,250	Island part of Senegal.
Cagliari Province	1,248	Province of Italy.
(Serbia) Podunavlje	1,248	District of Serbia.
(France) Val-d'Oise	1,246	Department of France.
(Denmark) Lolland	1,243	Island part of Denmark.
(Armenia) Armavir Province	1,242	Smallest province of Armenia.
(Israel) Central District	1,242	Third largest District of Israel.
(Equatorial Guinea) Bioko Sur	1,241	Province of Equatorial Guinea.
(El Salvador) Ahuachapán	1,240	Department of El Salvador.
(Burundi) Kayanza Province	1,233	Province of Burundi.
Pescara Province	1,230	Province of Italy.
(China) Chongming Island	1,229	Island part of China.
(Croatia) Krapina-Zagorje	1,229	Third smallest county of Croatia.
Ascoli Piceno Province	1,228	Province of Italy.
Orhei District	1,228	District of Moldova
(Papua New Guinea) New Hanover Island	1,227	Island part of Papua New Guinea.
(Indonesia) Rote Island	1,227	Island part of Indonesia.
(El Salvador) Sonsonate	1,225	Department of El Salvador.
(El Salvador) La Paz	1,224	Department of El Salvador.
Taoyuan	1,220.95	Special municipality of Taiwan.
Livorno Province	1,218	Province of Italy.
(Ethiopia) Dire Dawa	1,213	Chartered city region of Ethiopia.
New York City	1,212.6	City in the U.S. State of New York.
(Jamaica) Saint Ann Parish	1,212.6	Largest parish of Jamaica.
(Jamaica) Saint Elizabeth Parish	1,212.4	Second largest parish of Jamaica.
(India) South Andaman Island	1,211	Second-largest island of the Andaman and Nicobar Islands, part of India.
(Haiti) Nippes	1,210	Smallest department of Haiti (estimated, accurate current figures not available).
(Japan) Okinawa Island	1,206.98	Island part of Japan.
(Timor-Leste) Cova Lima	1,206.7	Municipality of East Timor.
(Kosovo) Gjilan	1,206	District of Kosovo.
(Scotland) South Ayrshire	1,202	Unitary district of Scotland.
Serranilla Bank	1,200	Disputed island in the Caribbean claimed by the United States, Nicaragua and Honduras, and administered by Colombia.
Varese Province	1,198.11	Province of Italy.
(Vanuatu) Penama Province	1,198	Second smallest province of Vanuatu.
(Jamaica) Clarendon Parish	1,196.3	Third largest parish of Jamaica.
(Dominican Republic) Sánchez Ramírez	1,196	Province of the Dominican Republic.
(French Polynesia) Windward Islands	1,195	Largest administrative subdivision of French Polynesia.
(North Macedonia) Prilep	1,194	Municipality of North Macedonia.
(England) Bedfordshire	1,193	Administrative county of England.
(Jamaica) Saint Catherine Parish	1,192.4	Parish of Jamaica.
Upper Magdalena	1,190	Second-level administrative province of Colombia within the department of Cundinamarca
(El Salvador) Santa Ana	1,184	Department of El Salvador.
(Philippines) Rizal	1,175.76	Province of the Philippines.
Naples Province	1,171	Province of Italy.
(Alaska) Municipality of Skagway	1,171	Municipality of Alaska.
(Brunei) Tutong	1,166	District of Brunei.
(Emirate of Fujairah) Fujairah	1,165	Emirate of the United Arab Emirates.
Tequendama	1,164	Second-level administrative province of Colombia within the department of Cundinamarca
Căușeni District	1,163	Third largest district of Moldova.
Diekirch	1,157	Largest district of Luxembourg.
Massa-Carrara Province	1,157	Province of Italy.
Imperia Province	1,154	Province of Italy.
Nueva Esparta	1,150	State of Venezuela.
(The Bahamas) Great Abaco	1,146	Third-largest island of the Bahamas.
Vibo Valentia Province	1,139	Province of Italy.
(Wales) Conwy	1,130	Unitary authority of Wales.
(Kosovo) Gjakova	1,129	District of Kosovo.
Martinique	1,128	French overseas département.
Upolu	1,125	Second-largest island of Samoa.
(United Kingdom) Omagh	1,124	Second largest district of Northern Ireland.
Larnaca	1,120.1	Distrit of Cyprus, partially ruled by the de facto state of Northern Cyprus.
(Jordan) Balqa	1,120	Governorate of Jordan.
(Dominican Republic) Santiago Rodríguez	1,111	Province of the Dominican Republic.
Florești District	1,108	District of Moldova.
(El Salvador) Cabañas	1,104	Third smallest department of El Salvador.
Hong Kong	1,104	Special administrative regions of the People's Republic of China.
Tolland County	1,100	County of Connecticut.
Providence County	1,100	County of Rhode Island.
(Russia) Alexandra Land	1,095	Third-largest island of Franz Josef Land, part of Russia.
Walloon Brabant	1,093	Province of Wallonia, Belgium.
Central Magdalena	1,091	Second-level administrative province of Colombia within the department of Cundinamarca
County Longford	1,091	County in the Leinster province of the Republic of Ireland.
Moscow	1,091	Smallest federal subject of Russia before its expansion on June 1, 2012.
(Burundi) Bubanza Province	1,089	Province of Burundi.
(Burundi) Bujumbura Rural Province	1,089	Province of Burundi.
Ungheni District	1,083	District of Moldova.
(Nicaragua) Carazo	1,081	Third smallest region of Nicaragua.
(Ukraine) Sevastopol	1,079	Independent city, first-level subdivision of Ukraine.
Canton of Uri	1,077	Canton of Switzerland.
Fălești District	1,073	District of Moldova.
(Iceland) Capital Region	1,062	Second smallest region of Iceland.
(Guatemala) Sololá	1,061	Second smallest department of Guatemala (tie).
(Guatemala) Totonicapán	1,061	Second smallest department of Guatemala (tie).
(Palestine) Hebron	1,060	Governorate of Palestine.
(South Korea) Ulsan	1,056	Largest metropolitan city of South Korea.
(French Polynesia) Marquesas Islands	1,049.3	Second largest administrative subdivision of French Polynesia.
Penang	1,046	State of Malaysia.
(French Polynesia) Tahiti	1,044	Largest island of French Polynesia.
Soroca District	1,043	District of Moldova.
(Nicaragua) Granada	1,040	Second smallest region of Nicaragua.
(Philippines) Dinagat Islands	1,036.34	Province of the Philippines.
Suffolk	1,033.82	Independent City of Virginia.
Sîngerei District	1,033	District of Moldova.
Atarashiki	1,030	A village community in Miyazaki, Japan.
(Kosovo) Ferizaj	1,030	District of Kosovo.
Grande Comore	1,025	Largest autonomous island in the Comoros.
Hiiu County	1,032	Smallest county of Estonia.
(Dominican Republic) Dajabón	1,021	Province of the Dominican Republic.
(Turkey) Düzce Province	1,014	Province of Turkey.
(Thailand) Samut Prakan Province	1,004	Province of Thailand.
(Egypt) Qalyubia Governorate	1,001	Governorate of Egypt.
Drochia District	1,000	District of Moldova.
(Mauritania) Nouakchott	1,000	Smallest region of Mauritania.
(Netherlands) Dutch Caribbean	999	Dutch islands in the Caribbean. These include the constituent countries of the Kingdom of the Netherlands--Aruba, Curaçao and Sint Maarten, and the three special municipalities of Bonaire, Saba and Sint Eustatius.
(North Macedonia) Kavadarci	998	Municipality of North Macedonia.
Ștefan Vodă District	998	District of Moldova.
Gazimağusa	997	District of Northern Cyprus, which is internationally recognized as a part of Cyprus.
Thurgau	991	Canton of Switzerland.
(Bhutan) Punaka	977	Third smallest district of Bhutan.
(Scotland) Mainland (Shetland)	968.87	Largest island of Shetland, part of Scotland.
(Thailand) Ang Thong Province	968	Province of Thailand.
(South Korea) Incheon	965	Second largest metropolitan city of South Korea.
(Tuscany) Pistoia Province	964.12	Province of Italy.
São Tomé and Príncipe	964	Country in Africa.
Middlesex County	960	County of Connecticut.
Rîșcani District	956	District of Moldova.
(Philippines) Marinduque	952.58	Province of the Philippines.
New Territories	952	Biggest one of the three areas of Hong Kong.
Turks and Caicos Islands	948	British Overseas Territory in the West Indies. Area includes protected waters.
(Jordan) Madaba	940	Governorate of Jordan.
Edineț District	933	District of Moldova.
(Montenegro) Bijelo Polje	924	Municipality of Montenegro.
(Vietnam) Hưng Yên Province	923.5	Province of Vietnam.
Cimișlia District	923	District of Moldova.
County Dublin	922	County in the Leinster province of the Republic of Ireland.
(Vietnam) Hanoi (municipality)	921.8	Third smallest province of Vietnam.
Rimini Province	921.77	Province of Italy.
(New Zealand) Chatham Island	920	Largest island of the Chatham Islands, part of New Zealand.
(Piedmont) Biella Province	913	Province of Italy.
Canton of Schwyz	908	Canton of Switzerland.
(Pakistan) Islamabad Capital Territory	906	Smallest province of Pakistan.
Luxembourg	904	District of Luxembourg.
(Montenegro) Cetinje	899	Municipality of Montenegro.
Kathmandu	899	Capital and largest city of Nepal.
(Trinidad and Tobago) Sangre Grande region	898.94	Largest region of Trinidad and Tobago.
County Carlow	897	County in the Leinster province of the Republic of Ireland.
(Montenegro) Kolašin	897	Municipality of Montenegro.
(Solomon Islands) Temotu Province	895	Third smallest province of the Solomon Islands.
Anenii Noi District	892	District of Moldova.
Berlin	892	City-state of Germany.
(South Korea) Daegu	886	Third largest metropolitan city of South Korea.
(El Salvador) San Salvador	886	Second smallest department of El Salvador.
(United Kingdom) Newry and Mourne	886	Third largest district of Northern Ireland.
(Scotland) North Ayrshire	884	Unitary district of Scotland.
(Vanuatu) Torba Province	882	Smallest province of Vanuatu.
La Spezia Province	881	Province of Italy.
(French Polynesia) Tuamotu-Gambier Islands	881	Administrative subdivision of French Polynesia.
Virgin Islands	877.6	Archipelago of islands in the Greater Antilles, consists of the Spanish Virgin Islands, British Virgin Islands and the United States Virgin Islands.
Chesapeake	876.74	Independent City of Virginia.
(North Macedonia) Makedonski Brod	875	Municipality of North Macedonia.
(Jamaica) Trelawny Parish	874.6	Parish of Jamaica.
(Transnistria) Slobozia	873.24	District of Transnistria, a breakaway republic recognized as a part of Moldova.
(Thailand) Samut Sakhon Province	872	Province of Thailand.
(Zimbabwe) Harare	872	Independent city of Zimbabwe.
Cantemir District	870	District of Moldova.
(Timor-Leste) Ainaro	869.8	Municipality of East Timor.
(Cambodia) City of Sihanoukville	868	Self-governing city of Cambodia.
Sevastopol City	864	Independent city of Ukraine second smallest political subdivision of Ukraine, currently controlled by Russia (Not recognized internationally as a part of Russia).
(Marche) Fermo Province	862	Province of Italy.
(United Kingdom) Strabane	861	District of Northern Ireland.
(Vietnam) Hà Nam Province	859.7	Second smallest province of Vietnam.
(Qatar) Al Shamal	859	Municipality of Qatar.
São Tomé Province	859	Province of São Tomé and Príncipe.
(North Macedonia) Mavrovo and Rostuša	856	Municipality of North Macedonia.
(Israel) Haifa District	854	Third smallest District of Israel.
(Montenegro) Plužine	854	Municipality of Montenegro.
(Tanzania) Zanzibar Central/South	854	Region of Tanzania.
(Trinidad and Tobago) Rio Claro–Mayaro	852.81	Second largest region of Trinidad and Tobago.
(Wales) Monmouthshire	851	Unitary authority of Wales.
(Transnistria) Rîbnița	850.2	District of Transnistria, a breakaway republic recognized as a part of Moldova.
Washington County	850	County of Rhode Island.
Telenești District	849	District of Moldova.
(Wales) Denbighshire	844	Unitary authority of Wales.
(Palestine) Ramallah and al-Bireh	844	Governorate of Palestine.
(Burundi) Mwaro Province	840	Third smallest province of Burundi.
(Mongolia) Orkhon Province	840	Smallest aimag of Mongolia.
Kyiv Oblast	839	Independent city of Ukraine; smallest political subdivision of Ukraine.
(Guinea-Bissau) Biombo	838.8	Region of Guinea-Bissau.
Canton of Jura	838	Canton of Switzerland.
(North Macedonia) Kičevo	838	Municipality of North Macedonia.
(England) North Lincolnshire	833	Unitary authority of England.
(Jamaica) Manchester Parish	830.1	Parish of Jamaica.
Southern Peninsula (Iceland)	829	Smallest region of Iceland.
Madeira	828	Autonomous Region of Portugal.
(Albania) Durrës County	827	Second smallest county of Albania.
County Louth	826	County in the Leinster province of the Republic of Ireland. Smallest of Ireland's 32 traditional counties.
(Vietnam) Bắc Ninh Province	823.1	Smallest province of Vietnam.
(Thailand) Sing Buri Province	823	Province of Thailand.
(Transnistria) Grigoriopol	822	District of Transnistria, a breakaway republic recognized as a part of Moldova.
(Brazil) Serraria Island	818	Island part of Brazil.
Briceni District	814	District of Moldova.
(Jamaica) Portland Parish	814	Parish of Jamaica.
Oecusse-Ambeno	813.6	Exclave special administrative region of East Timor.
Perlis	810	Smallest state of Malaysia.
(Algeria) Algiers Province	809	Province of Algeria.
(Jamaica) Westmoreland Parish	807	Parish of Jamaica.
(Lombardy) Lecco Province	805.61	Province of Italy.
Canton of Neuchâtel	803	Canton of Switzerland.
(Cambodia) City of Pailin	803	Self-governing city of Cambodia.
Netherlands Antilles	800	Country in Caribbean. Self-governing part of the Kingdom of the Netherlands. Includes Bonaire, Curaçao, Saba, Sint Eustatius, and Sint Maarten (Dutch part of the island of Saint Martin).
Chatham Islands	793.88	Island group of New Zealand (land area).
Canton of Solothurn	791	Canton of Switzerland.
(North Macedonia) Bitola	790	Municipality of North Macedonia.
Ialoveni District	783	District of Moldova.
Lodi Province	782.99	Province of Italy.
Umm al-Quwain	777	Second smallest emirate of the United Arab Emirates.
(Equatorial Guinea) Bioko Norte	776	Province of Equatorial Guinea.
(Panama) Kuna de Wargandí	775	Smallest province of Panama.
Leova District	775	District of Moldova.
İskele	774	District of Northern Cyprus, which is internationally recognized as a part of Cyprus.
(Timor-Leste) Ermera	770.8	Municipality of East Timor.
New Zealand Subantarctic Islands	764.64	The five southernmost groups of the New Zealand outlying islands. Includes the Auckland Islands, Campbell Islands, Bounty Islands, Antipodes Islands and The Snares.
(United Kingdom) Dungannon	763	District of Northern Ireland.
(Malawi) Chiradzulu	761	District of Malawi.
(South Korea) Busan	760	Metropolitan city of South Korea.
(Yemen) 'Adan Governorate	760	Smallest governorate of Yemen.
São Miguel Island	759	Largest island of the Azores, part of Portugal.
(El Salvador) Cuscatlán	756	Smallest department of El Salvador.
(Malawi) Mwanza	756	District of Malawi.
Hamburg	755	City-state of Germany.
(North Macedonia) Novaci	755	Municipality of North Macedonia.
Glodeni District	754	District of Moldova.
Călărași District	753	District of Moldova.
(North Korea) Namp'o-si	753	Special city of North Korea.
Dominica	751	Country in the Caribbean.
Tonga	747	Country in Oceania.
(Jamaica) Saint Thomas Parish	742.8	Parish of Jamaica.
Madeira Island	740.7	Largest island of Madeira, part of Portugal.
Free Territory of Trieste	738	Former European nation from 1947-1975.
Republic of Indian Stream	731	Unrecognized, constitutional republic in North America, 1832–1835.
(Rwanda) Kigali	730	Capital city and province-level unit of Rwanda.
Strășeni District	730	District of Moldova.
(Croatia) Međimurje	729	Second smallest county of Croatia.
(North Macedonia) Čaška	727	Municipality of North Macedonia.
Kiribati	726	Country in Oceania. Includes three island groups - Gilbert Islands, Line Islands, Phoenix Islands.
(Trinidad and Tobago) Couva–Tabaquite–Talparo	719.64	Region of Trinidad and Tobago.
(Wales) Anglesey	719	Unitary authority of Wales.
(Albania) Lezhë County	714	Smallest county of Albania.
(Canary Islands) La Palma	708.32	Third-smallest of the main islands of the Canary Islands, part of Spain.
(England) West Berkshire	704	Unitary authority of England.
Federated States of Micronesia	702	Country in Oceania. Includes Pohnpei (Ponape), Chuuk (Truk) Islands, Yap Islands, and Kosrae (Kosaie).
(Burundi) Muramvya Province	696	Second smallest province of Burundi.
Bahrain	694	Country in Middle East.
Girne	690	District of Northern Cyprus, which is internationally recognized as a part of Cyprus.
Criuleni District	688	District of Moldova.
Canton of Glarus	685	Canton of Switzerland.
(Kenya) Nairobi Province	684	Smallest Province of Kenya.
Singapore	683	Country in Asia. UN figure is as of 2004. Official area in 2006 is 704 km^{2}.
(Egypt) Aswan Governorate	679	Governorate of Egypt.
(Scotland) East Lothian	678	Unitary district of Scotland.
(Timor-Leste) Aileu	676	Municipality of East Timor.
Taraclia District	674	District of Moldova.
(Turkey) Yalova Province	674	Smallest province of Turkey.
(Solomon Islands) Rennell and Bellona Province	671	Second smallest province of the Solomon Islands.
(Niger) Niamey Department	670	Smallest department of Niger.
(United Kingdom) Armagh	667	District of Northern Ireland.
(Indonesia) Jakarta Special Capital Region	662	Smallest province of Indonesia.
Ravenna	653	Second largest municipality of Italy.
Dondușeni District	645	District of Moldova.
(Palestine) Bethlehem	644	Governorate of Palestine.
Kyrenia	643.9	District of Cyprus, but entirely ruled by Northern Cyprus.
(Bhutan) Tsirang	641	Second smallest district of Bhutan.
(Croatia) Zagreb County (Grad Zagreb)	641	Smallest county of Croatia.
(United Kingdom) Down	638	District of Northern Ireland.
(United Kingdom) Ballymena	634	District of Northern Ireland.
Virginia Beach	633.83	Independent City of Virginia.
Aran	633.5	Autonomous administrative entity in Spain.
Nisporeni District	630	District of Moldova.
(Israel) Jerusalem District	627	Second smallest District of Israel.
(Thailand) Nongbua Lamphu Province	622	Third smallest province of Thailand.
(Trinidad and Tobago) Princes Town region	621.35	Region of Trinidad and Tobago.
Rezina District	621	District of Moldova.
(Philippines) Metro Manila	616.28	Municipality of the Philippines.
(Solomon Islands) Central Province	615	Smallest province of the Solomon Islands.
(Nicaragua) Masaya	611	Smallest region of Nicaragua.
(Jamaica) Saint Mary Parish	610.5	Parish of Jamaica.
(France) Territoire de Belfort	609	Department of France.
(Palestine) Jericho	608	Governorate of Palestine.
(South Korea) Seoul	606	Capital metropolitan city of South Korea.
(Philippines) Guimaras	604.57	Province of the Philippines.
(Mozambique) Maputo City	602	Capital city province of Mozambique.
(Philippines) Babuyan Islands	600	Archipelago in the northern Philippines.
(Montenegro) Bar	598	Municipality of Montenegro.
Șoldănești District	598	District of Moldova.
(North Macedonia) Berovo	597	Municipality of North Macedonia.
Ocnița District	597	District of Moldova.
(Jamaica) Saint James Parish	594.9	Parish of Jamaica.
(Apulia) Cerignola	593.92	Third largest municipality of Italy.
(Palestine) Nablus	592	Governorate of Palestine.
(Egypt) Damietta Governorate	589	Governorate of Egypt.
(United Kingdom) Limavady	585	District of Northern Ireland.
(Palestine) Jenin	583	Governorate of Palestine.
(North Macedonia) Štip	583	Municipality of North Macedonia.
(England) Doncaster	581	Metropolitan borough of England.
(Tanzania) Pemba North	574	Region of Tanzania.
Isle of Man	572	Crown dependency of the UK.
Brunei-Muara	571	District of Brunei.
Chișinău	563	District-level municipality of Moldova.
(United Kingdom) Magherafelt	562	District of Northern Ireland.
(England) Leeds	562	Metropolitan borough (city) of England.
(Sierra Leone) Western Area	557	Smallest first level subdivision of Sierra Leone.
Kočevje	555	Municipality of Slovenia.
(Montenegro) Šavnik	553	Municipality of Montenegro.
(Timor-Leste) Liquiçá	551	Municipality of East Timor.
(Senegal) Dakar Region	550	Smallest region of Senegal.
Guam	549	Country in Organized unincorporated territory of the USA.
(North Macedonia) Resen	549	Municipality of North Macedonia.
(Montenegro) Berane	544	Municipality of Montenegro.
(Thailand) Phuket Province	543	Second smallest province of Thailand.
Guam	541	Territory of the United States.
(South Korea) Daejeon	540	Second smallest metropolitan city of South Korea.
Saint Lucia	539	Country in the Caribbean.
(Philippines) Biliran	536.01	Province of the Philippines.
(Ethiopia) Addis Ababa	530	Chartered city region of Ethiopia.
(Uruguay) Montevideo Department	530	Smallest department of Uruguay.
(Trinidad and Tobago) Tunapuna–Piarco	527.23	Region of Trinidad and Tobago.
Grevenmacher	525	Smallest district of Luxembourg.
(Myanmar) Yangon Region	521	Smallest region of Myanmar (Myanmar has certain administrative divisions titled as Regions, and others titled as States).
(Bhutan) Pemagatshel	518	Smallest district of Bhutan.
Basel-Landschaft	518	Canton of Switzerland.
(North Macedonia) Veles	518	Municipality of North Macedonia.
(North Macedonia) Staro Nagoričane	515	Municipality of North Macedonia.
Lefkoşa	513	District of Northern Cyprus, which is internationally recognized as a part of Cyprus.
(United Kingdom) Cookstown	512	District of Northern Ireland.
(Trinidad and Tobago) Siparia region	510.48	Region of Trinidad and Tobago.
(North Macedonia) Radoviš	502	Municipality of North Macedonia.
(Montenegro) Danilovgrad	501	Municipality of Montenegro.
(South Korea) Gwangju	501	Smallest metropolitan city of South Korea.
(Wales) Wrexham	499	Unitary authority of Wales.
(Quebec) Region of Montreal	498	Region of Quebec
(England) South Gloucestershire	497	Unitary authority of England.
(Czech Republic) Prague	496	Capital city of the Czech Republic;has regional status.
(United Kingdom) Moyle	494	District of Northern Ireland.
(Bosnia and Herzegovina) Brčko District	493	Administrative unit of Bosnia and Herzegovina.
(India) Puducherry	492	Union Territory of India.
Obwalden	491	Canton of Switzerland.
(India) Dadra and Nagar Haveli	491	Union Territory of India.
(North Macedonia) Gevgelija	484	Municipality of North Macedonia.
(North Macedonia) Sveti Nikole	483	Municipality of North Macedonia.
(North Macedonia) Kriva Palanka	482	Municipality of North Macedonia.
(North Macedonia) Demir Hisar	480	Municipality of North Macedonia.
Southern Governorate	480	Largest governorate of Bahrain.
Ilirska Bistrica	480	Municipality of Slovenia.
(Zimbabwe) Bulawayo	479	Independent city of Zimbabwe.
(United Kingdom) Coleraine	478	District of Northern Ireland.
Northern Mariana Islands	477	Territory of the United States.
Gorizia Province	475	Province of Italy.
(Scotland) North Lanarkshire	474	Unitary district of Scotland.
(Scotland) Small Isles	472	Archipelago part of Scotland.
(Tanzania) Zanzibar North	470	Region of Tanzania.
(North Macedonia) Struga	469	Municipality of North Macedonia.
Andorra	468	Country in Europe.
(Guatemala) Sacatepéquez	465	Smallest department of Guatemala.
Northern Mariana Islands	464	Commonwealth in political union with the USA. Includes 14 islands including Saipan, Rota, and Tinian.
Palau	459	Country in Oceania.
Fingal	456	Administrative county within the province of Leinster, in the Republic of Ireland.
Seychelles	455	Country in Africa.
(Norway) Oslo	454	County of Norway.
(Jamaica) Hanover Parish	450.4	Third smallest parish of Jamaica.
(Guinea) Conakry Region	450	Special Zone of Guinea.
Pico Island	447	Second-largest island of the Azores, part of Portugal.
(Montenegro) Žabljak	445	Municipality of Montenegro.
Curaçao	444	Country in South America; self-governing part of the Kingdom of the Netherlands.
(New Zealand) Nelson	444	Unitary authority and smallest region of New Zealand.
(New Zealand) Auckland Island	442.5	Largest island of the Auckland Islands, part of New Zealand.
Antigua and Barbuda	442	Country in the Caribbean. Includes Redonda, 1.6 km^{2}.
(Wales) Neath Port Talbot	441	Unitary authority of Wales.
(United Kingdom) Banbridge	441	District of Northern Ireland.
Kent County	440	County of Rhode Island.
(Wales) Flintshire	437	Unitary authority of Wales.
(United Kingdom) Lisburn	436	District of Northern Ireland.
(Transnistria) Camenca	434.5	District of Transnistria, a breakaway republic recognized as a part of Moldova.
Venezuelan Capital District (Distrito Capital)	433	Smallest state of Venezuela.
(Scotland) Isle of Arran	432.01	Largest island of the Islands of the Clyde, part of Scotland.
(North Macedonia) Kumanovo	432	Municipality of North Macedonia.
(Montenegro) Rožaje	432	Municipality of Montenegro.
(North Macedonia) Vinica	432	Municipality of North Macedonia.
(Jamaica) Saint Andrew Parish	430.7	Second smallest parish of Jamaica.
Barbados	430	Country in the Caribbean.
(Scotland) West Lothian	425	Unitary district of Scotland.
Anjouan	424	Autonomous island in the Comoros.
(Wales) Rhondda Cynon Taff	424	Unitary authority of Wales.
(North Macedonia) Debarca	423	Municipality of North Macedonia.
(North Macedonia) Delčevo	423	Municipality of North Macedonia.
(Jordan) Ajloun	420	Governorate of Jordan.
(North Macedonia) Dolneni	418	Municipality of North Macedonia.
(United Kingdom) Ballymoney	417	District of Northern Ireland.
(Thailand) Samut Songkhram Province	417	Smallest province of Thailand.
Vienna	415	Smallest state of Austria.
(North Macedonia) Negotino	414	Municipality of North Macedonia.
Heard Island and McDonald Islands	412	Australian Territory Island.
(Jordan) Jerash	410	Governorate of Jordan.
(England) Kirklees	410	Metropolitan borough of England.
Monza and Brianza	405.55	Third smallest province of Italy.
(United Kingdom) Antrim	405	District of Northern Ireland.
Free Hanseatic City of Bremen	404	Smallest city-state of Germany.
Terceira Island	400.6	Third-largest island of the Azores, part of Portugal.
(French Polynesia) Leeward Islands	395	Second smallest administrative subdivision of French Polynesia.
| | | Saint Helena, Ascension and Tristan da Cunha	394	British Overseas Territory.
(United Kingdom) Lough Neagh	392	Lake in Northern Ireland. Largest lake in Great Britain and Ireland.
(North Macedonia) Ohrid	392	Municipality of North Macedonia.
Saint Vincent and the Grenadines	388	Country in the Caribbean.
(England) Rutland	382	Unitary authority of England.
Federal Territory	381.65	Locally known as "Wilayah Persekutuan". Encompasses Kuala Lumpur, Labuan and Putrajaya.
Tolmin	381.5	Municipality of Slovenia.
(Transnistria) Dubăsari	381.2	District of Transnistria, a breakaway republic recognized as a part of Moldova.
(England) Isle of Wight	380.99	Unitary authority of England.
(Yemen) Sanaa	380	City-governorate of Yemen.
(Puerto Rico) Spanish Virgin Islands	378.2	Islands part of the Virgin Islands archipelago, part of Puerto Rico.
(Wales) Swansea	378	Unitary authority (city) of Wales.
(Norway) Jan Mayen	377	Norwegian Territory Island.
(North Macedonia) Gostivar	375	Municipality of North Macedonia.
(North Macedonia) Kratovo	375	Municipality of North Macedonia.
(Dominican Republic) Lake Enriquillo	375	Lake of the Dominican Republic. It's the largest of the Hispañola and the Caribbean itself.
(England) North Somerset	375	Unitary authority of England.
Mayotte	374	Overseas department of France.
(United Kingdom) Derry	373	District of Northern Ireland.
(Palestine) Tubas	372	Governorate of Palestine.
Lake Garda	369.98	Largest lake in Italy.
(Canary Islands) La Gomera	369.76	Second-smallest of the main islands of the Canary Islands, part of Spain.
Heard Island and McDonald Islands	368	Island of Australia.
(United Kingdom) Ards	368	District of Northern Ireland.
Bovec	367.3	Municipality of Slovenia.
(Montenegro) Mojkovac	367	Municipality of Montenegro.
(England) Sheffield	367	Metropolitan borough (city) of England.
(England) Bradford	366	Metropolitan borough (city) of England.
(Tuscany) Prato Province	365.5	Second smallest province of Italy.
(Palestine) Gaza Strip	365	Smaller one of the two territories of Palestine.
(England) Calderdale	363	Metropolitan borough of England.
(North Macedonia) Kočani	357	Municipality of North Macedonia.
(Scotland) Midlothian	356	Unitary district of Scotland.
(French Southern and Antarctic Lands) Crozet Islands	352	District of the French Southern and Antarctic Lands.
(England) Bath and North East Somerset	351	Unitary authority of England.
(Georgia (country)) Tbilisi	350	Capital region of Georgia.
United States Virgin Islands	347	Unincorporated, organized territory of the USA in the Caribbean.
Pohnpei	346	Largest state of the Federated States of Micronesia.
United Nations Buffer Zone in Cyprus	346	Demilitarised zone patrolled by the United Nations Peacekeeping Force in Cyprus to separate Cyprus and Northern Cyprus.
Grenada	344	Country in the Caribbean.
(Palestine) Quds	344	Governorate of Palestine.
Saint Vincent	344	Largest island of Saint Vincent and the Grenadines.
Clervaux	342.17	Largest canton of Luxembourg.
Federal Dependencies of Venezuela	342	Venezuela's off shore islands in the Caribbean Sea and the Gulf of Venezuela.
Črnomelj	339.7	Municipality of Slovenia.
(Philippines) Siquijor	337.49	Third smallest province of the Philippines.
(Wales) Vale of Glamorgan	337	Unitary authority of Wales.
(United Kingdom) Larne	337	District of Northern Ireland.
(Cambodia) City of Kep	335.8	Self-governing city of Cambodia.
Bohinj	333.7	Municipality of Slovenia.
(England) Wakefield	333	Metropolitan borough (city) of England.
(England) Peterborough	333	Unitary authority of England.
(Tanzania) Pemba South	332	Region of Tanzania.
(North Macedonia) Valandovo	331	Municipality of North Macedonia.
(England) Barnsley	328	Metropolitan borough of England.
Caribbean Netherlands	328	The three special municipalities of the Netherlands in the Caribbean--Bonaire, Saba and Sint Eustatius.
(Montenegro) Plav	328	Municipality of Montenegro.
(Canada) Helena Island	326	Island in the Arctic Archipelago.
(North Macedonia) Probištip	326	Municipality of North Macedonia.
(Qatar) Umm Salal	318	Third smallest municipality of Qatar.
Malta	316	Country in Europe.
(North Macedonia) Demir Kapija	312	Municipality of North Macedonia.
(Ethiopia) Harari Region	311	Smallest region of Ethiopia.
(North Macedonia) Strumica	311	Municipality of North Macedonia.
(Latvia) Riga	307	Largest city of Latvia with separate status (not part of any district).
Dubăsari District	309	District of Moldova.
(England) Milton Keynes	309	Unitary authority of England.
City of Minsk	305.5	Capital and the largest city of Belarus.
Koper	304	Municipality of Slovenia.
(Japan) Izu Islands	301.56	Archipelago part of Japan.
(Trinidad and Tobago) Tobago	300	Autonomous Island of Trinidad and Tobago.
(Uzbekistan) Tashkent	300	Capital province and smallest province of Uzbekistan.
(Scotland) Falkirk	299	Unitary district of Scotland.
Novo Mesto	298.5	Municipality of Slovenia.
Maldives	298	Country in Asia.
Canton of Schaffhausen	298	Canton of Switzerland.
Basarabeasca District	295	Smallest non-municipality district of Moldova.
Bonaire	294	Special municipality of the Kingdom of the Netherlands.
Idrija	293.7	Municipality of Slovenia.
(North Macedonia) Gradsko	291	Municipality of North Macedonia.
(South Africa) Marion Island	290	Sub-antarctic territory of South Africa
(Cambodia) City of Phnom Penh	290	Self-governing city of Cambodia.
(England) Telford and Wrekin	290	Unitary authority of England.
(Qatar) Al Daayen	290	Second smallest municipality of Qatar.
Bonaire	288	Dutch Territory Island.
Krško	286.5	Municipality of Slovenia.
(Montenegro) Andrijevica	283	Municipality of Montenegro.
(England) Rotherham	283	Metropolitan borough of England.
Canton of Geneva	282	Canton of Switzerland.
Nova Gorica	280	Municipality of Slovenia.
(United Kingdom) Craigavon	280	District of Northern Ireland.
(Wales) Caerphilly	279	Unitary authority of Wales.
Nidwalden	276	Canton of Switzerland.
(North Macedonia) Studeniċani	276	Municipality of North Macedonia.
Ljubljana	275	The largest and capital city of Slovenia.
Sevnica	272.17	Municipality of Slovenia.
Taipei	271.8	Special municipality and capital of Taiwan.
(England) York	271	Unitary authority (city) of England.
(North Macedonia) Lipkovo	270	Municipality of North Macedonia.
Postojna	269.9	Municipality of Slovenia.
(Canary Islands) El Hierro	268.71	Smallest of the main islands of the Canary Islands, part of Spain.
Brežice	268.1	Municipality of Slovenia.
Redange	267.49	Second largest canton of Luxembourg.
Caué	267	Largest district of São Tomé and Príncipe.
Kamnik	266	Municipality of Slovenia.
(England) Birmingham	265	Metropolitan borough (city) of England.
Wiltz	264.55	Third largest canton of Luxembourg.
Cayman Islands	264	British Overseas Territory.
(Scotland) Edinburgh	262	Unitary district (city) of Scotland.
(North Macedonia) Tetovo	262	Municipality of North Macedonia.
(Honduras) Islas de la Bahía	261	Smallest department of Honduras.
(Scotland) Renfrewshire	261	Unitary district of Scotland.
Saint Kitts and Nevis	261	Country in the Caribbean.
Slovenska Bistrica	260.1	Municipality of Slovenia.
Niue	260	Country in Oceania. Self-governing nation in free association with New Zealand.
Newport County	260	County of Rhode Island.
Ajman	259	Smallest emirate of the United Arab Emirates.
(North Macedonia) Novo Selo	257	Municipality of North Macedonia.
Kranjska Gore	256.3	Municipality of Slovenia.
(North Macedonia) Mogila	255	Municipality of North Macedonia.
(Montenegro) Ulcinj	255	Municipality of Montenegro.
Akrotiri and Dhekelia	254	British Cyprus Territory Island.
(Mali) Bamako Capital District	252	Capital district of Mali.
Penal–Debe	246.91	Regional corporation of Trinidad and Tobago.
Bridgend	246	Unitary authority of Wales.
Municipality of Ajdovščina	245.2	Municipality of Slovenia.
Val-de-Marne	245	Department of France.
Redcar and Cleveland	245	Unitary authority of England.
Appenzell Ausserrhoden	243	Canton of Switzerland.
Peter I Island	243	Norwegian claim to Antarctica.
Esch-sur-Alzette	242.77	Canton of Luxembourg.
Île Jésus	242	An island in Montreal.
Saint Pierre and Miquelon	242	French overseas collectivity in the North Atlantic Ocean. Includes eight small islands in the Saint Pierre and the Miquelon-Langlade groups.
Cerknica	241	Municipality of Slovenia.
National Capital District	240	Capital city of Papua New Guinea; city with provincial status.
(North Macedonia) Rankovce	240	Municipality of North Macedonia.
Canton of Zug	239	Third smallest canton of Switzerland.
(Palestine) Tulkarm	239	Governorate of Palestine.
Luxembourg	238.46	Canton of Luxembourg.
Camiguin	237.95	Second smallest province of the Philippines.
Cook Islands	236	Country in Oceania. Self-governing in free association with New Zealand.
Seine-Saint-Denis	236	Third smallest department of France.
(Montenegro) Tuzi	236	Municipality of Montenegro.
(Montenegro) Herceg Novi	235	Municipality of Montenegro.
(North Macedonia) Konče	233	Municipality of North Macedonia.
(North Macedonia) Karbinci	231	Municipality of North Macedonia.
(North Macedonia) Vasilevo	231	Municipality of North Macedonia.
(North Macedonia) Saraj	230	Municipality of North Macedonia.
Zanzibar Urban/West Region	230	Smallest region of Tanzania.
Swindon	230	Unitary authority of England.
Lembá	229	Second largest district of São Tomé and Príncipe.
București (Bucharest)	228	Municipality of Romania. Bucharest is the smallest first level subdivision of Romania, and the only non-county subdivision.
Yangzhong	228	An island in the Jiangsu Province.
Yerevan	227	City with provincial status in Armenia. Yerevan is the smallest first level subdivision of Armenia.
Ivančna Gorica	227	Municipality of Slovenia.
(Timor-Leste) Dili Municipality	224	Municipality of East Timor.
Mersch	223.90	Canton of Luxembourg.
Pivka	223.3	Municipality of Slovenia.
(North Macedonia) Sopište	223	Municipality of North Macedonia.
South Dublin	223	Administrative county within the province of Leinster, in the Republic of Ireland.
Šentjur	222.3	Municipality of Slovenia.
(North Macedonia) Petrovec	222	Municipality of North Macedonia.
Litija	221	Municipality of Slovenia.
San Juan–Laventille	220.39	Second smallest regional corporation of Trinidad and Tobago.
Voorne-Putten	220	An island in the Maas Rivers.
Batanes	219.01	Smallest province of the Philippines.
Güzelyurt	219	District of Northern Cyprus, which is internationally recognized as a part of Cyprus.
Sežana	217.4	Municipality of Slovenia.
Saint Croix	215.8	District of the US Virgin Islands.
(North Macedonia) Čučer-Sandevo	215	Municipality of North Macedonia.
Cairo Governorate	214	Governorate of Egypt.
Province of Trieste	212	Smallest province of Italy.
Grevenmacher	211.37	Canton of Luxembourg.
(North Macedonia) Pehčevo	208	Municipality of North Macedonia.
Diekirch	204.51	Canton of Luxembourg.
(Kuwait) Farwaniya	204	Governorate of Kuwait.
Stockton-on-Tees	204	Unitary authority of England.
City of Buenos Aires	203	Federal district of Argentina.
Doha	202.7	Smallest municipality of Qatar.
West Region	201.3	Largest region of Singapore.
(North Macedonia) Želino	201	Municipality of North Macedonia.
Djibouti Region	200	Smallest region of Djibouti.
Wallis and Futuna	200	French overseas collectivity. Includes Île Uvéa (Wallis Island), Île Futuna (Futuna Island), Île Alofi, and 20 islets.
Capellen	199.21	Canton of Luxembourg.
American Samoa	199	Unorganized, unincorporated territory of the US in Oceania. Includes Rose Atoll and Swains Island.
Hisingen	199	An island in Gothenburg.
Wigan	199	Metropolitan borough of England.
Channel Islands	198	Archipelago in the English Channel, consists of the British Crown dependencies of Guernsey and Jersey.
Windsor and Maidenhead	198	Unitary authority of England.
Laško	197.5	Municipality of Slovenia.
Darlington	197	Unitary authority of England.
Trebnje	195	Municipality of Slovenia.
Aruba	193	Country in South America; self-governing part of the Kingdom of the Netherlands.
Kobarid	192.7	Municipality of Slovenia.
Hrpelje-Kozina	192.2	Municipality of Slovenia.
Medway	192	Unitary authority of England.
North East Lincolnshire	192	Unitary authority of England.
Newport	191	Unitary authority (city) of Wales.
Mosquiero	191	An island in Baia de Marajo.
Narva Reservoir	191	Reservoir in Europe between Estonia and Russia.
(Palestine) Salfit	191	Governorate of Palestine.
(North Macedonia) Kruševo	190	Municipality of North Macedonia.
(North Macedonia) Makedonska Kamenica	189	Municipality of North Macedonia.
Cork City	187	Local Authority in the Republic of Ireland.
Aberdeen City council area	186	Unitary district (city) of Scotland.
Echternach	185.54	Third smallest canton of Luxembourg.
Tristan da Cunha	184	Largest administrative area (Island Council) of Saint Helena, Ascension and Tristan da Cunha.
Osh	183	Second smallest province of Kyrgyzstan.
Islands	182.74	District in Hong Kong.
Marshall Islands	181	Country in Oceania. Includes the atolls of Bikini, Enewetak, Kwajalein, Majuro, Rongelap, and Utirik.
Aruba	180	Dutch Territory Beach Netherlands Island.
Mbamu	180	An island in the Congo.
Saint Andrew Parish	179.9	Largest parish of Dominica.
Solihull	179	Metropolitan borough of England.
Wokingham	179	Unitary authority of England.
Newport News	178.68	Independent City of Virginia.
(Timor-Leste) Dili	178.62	Capital and largest city of East Timor.
Washington, District of Columbia	177	Capital District of the United States.
(North Macedonia) Zelenikovo	177	Municipality of North Macedonia.
Hauts-de-Seine	176	Second smallest department of France.
Warrington	176	Unitary authority of England.
(Kuwait) Asimah	175	Governorate of Kuwait.
Glasgow City council area	175	Unitary district (city) of Scotland.
Northern Governorate	175	Governorate of Bahrain.
(North Macedonia) Jegunovce	174	Municipality of North Macedonia.
Slovenj Gradec	173.7	Municipality of Slovenia.
Logatec	173.1	Municipality of Slovenia.
Appenzell Innerrhoden	173	Second smallest canton of Switzerland.
East Renfrewshire	173	Unitary district of Scotland.
(Montenegro) Petnjica	173	Municipality of Montenegro.
East Dunbartonshire	172	Unitary district of Scotland.
Tel Aviv	170	Smallest District of Israel.
Bishkek	170	Smallest province of Kyrgyzstan.
Saint Kitts	168	Larger of the two main islands of Saint Kitts and Nevis.
Loška Dolina	166.8	Municipality of Slovenia.
Quezon City	166.2	Largest city in the Philippines.
(North Macedonia) Lozovo	166	Municipality of North Macedonia.
Žužemberk	164.3	Municipality of Slovenia.
Železniki	164	Municipality of Slovenia.
(North Macedonia) Brvenica	164	Municipality of North Macedonia.
Thurrock	164	Unitary authority of England.
(Palestine) Qalqilya	164	Governorate of Palestine.
Easter Island	163.6	Special territory of Chile.
Providenciales and West Caicos	163.6	Largest administrative district of the Turks and Caicos Islands.
Lefke	162	District of Northern Cyprus, which is internationally recognized as a part of Cyprus.
West Dunbartonshire	162	Tie for third smallest unitary district of Scotland.
Inverclyde	162	Tie for third smallest unitary district of Scotland.
Brussels-Capital Region	161	Region of Belgium.
Barbuda	160.58	Dependency of Antigua and Barbuda.
Rochdale	160	Metropolitan borough of England.
Liechtenstein	160	Smallest doubly landlocked country of the world.
Wirral	159	Metropolitan borough of England.
Clackmannanshire	157	Second smallest unitary district of Scotland.
(Montenegro) Gusinje	157	Municipality of Montenegro.
(North Macedonia) Vrapčište	157	Municipality of North Macedonia.
Črna na Koroškem	156	Municipality of Slovenia.
Tržič	155.4	Municipality of Slovenia.
Richmond	155.2	Independent City of Virginia.
Northern Islands Municipality	154.76	Largest municipality of the Northern Mariana Islands.
Peter I Island	154	Norway Antarctica Territory Island.
Ribnica	153.6	Municipality of Slovenia.
Gorenja Vas-Poljane	153.3	Municipality of Slovenia.
Sefton	153	Metropolitan borough of England.
(Montenegro) Zeta	153	Municipality of Montenegro.
Newtownabbey	151	District of Northern Ireland.
Kranj	151	Municipality of Slovenia.
British Virgin Islands	151	British Overseas Territory; comprises 16 inhabited and more than 20 uninhabited islands. Includes the island of Anegada.
Calamba	149.5	1st class city in the province of Laguna, Philippines.
Charlotte Parish	149	Largest parish of Saint Vincent and the Grenadines.
Tai Po	148.19	District in Hong Kong.
Austral Islands	148	Smallest administrative subdivision of French Polynesia.
Maribor	148	Municipality of Slovenia.
Divača	147.8	Municipality of Slovenia.
Zagorje ob Savi	147.1	Municipality of Slovenia.
Callao Region	147	Smallest region of Peru.
Semič	146.7	Municipality of Slovenia.
Kanal ob Soči	146.5	Municipality of Slovenia.
Bajo Nuevo Bank	145	Disputed island in the Caribbean claimed by the United States, Nicaragua and Jamaica, and administered by Colombia.
Škofja Loka	145	Municipality of Slovenia.
Nukufetau (total area)	145	Atoll of Tuvalu.
North Caicos	144.9	Second largest administrative district of the Turks and Caicos Islands.
Moravske Toplice	144.5	Municipality of Slovenia.
Middle Caicos	144.2	Administrative district of the Turks and Caicos Islands.
Chandigarh	144	Union Territory of India.
Don Khong	144	An island in the Mekong River.
(North Macedonia) Bosilovo	143	Municipality of North Macedonia.
Gateshead	143	Metropolitan borough of England.
Wallis and Futuna	142	French Territory Island.
Príncipe Province	142	Third biggest district of São Tomé and Príncipe.
Ormož	141.6	Municipality of Slovenia.
(North Macedonia) Bogovinje	141	Municipality of North Macedonia.
Oldham	141	Metropolitan borough of England.
(Timor-Leste) Atauro	140.5	Municipality of East Timor.
Bolton	140	Metropolitan borough of England.
Cardiff	139	Unitary authority (city) of Wales.
Yuen Long	138.56	District in Hong Kong.
North-East Region	138.1	Second largest region of Singapore.
Sunderland	138	Metropolitan borough (city) of England.
Norfolk	137.98	Independent City of Virginia.
Blackburn with Darwen	137	Unitary authority of England.
(North Macedonia) Tearce	137	Municipality of North Macedonia.
South Caicos and East Caicos	136.8	Administrative district of the Turks and Caicos Islands.
North	136.51	District in Hong Kong
Sai Kung	136.34	District in Hong Kong.
Christmas Island	135	Australian Territory Island.
North Region	134.5	Region of Singapore.
Municipality of Loški Potok	134	Municipality of Slovenia.
Grosuplje	133.8	Municipality of Slovenia.
Hampton	133.28	Independent City of Virginia.
(North Macedonia) Češinovo-Obleševo	133	Municipality of North Macedonia.
(North Macedonia) Rosoman	133	Municipality of North Macedonia.
Saint Helens	133	Metropolitan borough of England.
Central Region	132.7	Second smallest region of Singapore.
Sinuiju	132	A planned special administrative region of North Korea.
Cerkno	131.6	Municipality of Slovenia.
Belfast	130	District of Northern Ireland.
(North Macedonia) Dojran	129	Municipality of North Macedonia.
Remich	127.87	Second smallest canton of Luxembourg.
Diego Martin region	127.53	Smallest regional corporation of Trinidad and Tobago.
Chuuk	127	State of the Federated States of Micronesia.
Lynchburg	126.84	Independent City of Virginia.
Torfaen	126	Third smallest unitary authority of Wales.
Stockport	126	Metropolitan borough of England.
Dún Laoghaire–Rathdown	125.8	Administrative county within the province of Leinster, in the Republic of Ireland.
Saint David Parish	125.8	Second largest parish of Dominica.
Lulu Island	122.4	An island in the Fraser River.
(Montenegro) Budva	122	Municipality of Montenegro.
Daman and Diu	122	Union Territory of India.
Saint Helena	122	Administrative area (Legislative Council) of Saint Helena, Ascension and Tristan da Cunha.
Lendava	121	Municipality of Slovenia.
Mé-Zóchi	121	District of São Tomé and Príncipe.
Canillo	121	Largest parish of Andorra.
Davis Island	120	An island in the Mississippi River.
Cantagalo	119	Third smallest district of São Tomé and Príncipe.
Radovljica	118.7	Municipality of Slovenia.
Saint Joseph Parish	118.4	Third largest parish of Dominica.
Damascus	118	Smallest governorate of Syria.
Yap	118	State of the Federated States of Micronesia.
Dublin City	117.8	Local Authority in the Republic of Ireland.
Dobrova-Polhov Gradec	117.5	Municipality of Slovenia.
Žalec	117.1	Municipality of Slovenia.
Asunción Department	117	Smallest department of Paraguay.
Manchester	116	Metropolitan borough (city) of England.
Jersey	116	Crown dependency of the UK.
Gorje	116	Municipality of Slovenia.
Vrhnika	116	Municipality of Slovenia.
Saipan Municipality	115.38	Second largest municipality of the Northern Mariana Islands.
(North Macedonia) Bogdanci	114	Municipality of North Macedonia.
Liverpool	113	Metropolitan borough (city) of England.
Northern Region	112.9	Region of Malta.
Mislinja	112.2	Municipality of Slovenia.
Newcastle upon Tyne	112	Metropolitan borough (city) of England.
Merthyr Tydfil	111	Second smallest unitary authority of Wales.
Danville	110.84	Independent Coty of Virginia.
Dolenjske Toplice	110.2	Municipality of Slovenia.
Roanoke	110.13	Independent City of Virginia.
East Region	110	Smallest region of Singapore.
Bristol	110	Unitary authority (city) of England.
Sarpinskiy Island	110	An island in Volgograd.
Kosrae	110	Smallest state of the Federated States of Micronesia.
Luče	109.5	Municipality of Slovenia.
Blaenau Gwent	109	Smallest unitary authority of Wales.
Bracknell Forest	109	Unitary authority of England.
Metlika	108.9	Municipality of Slovenia.
Tinian Municipality	108.11	Second smallest municipality of the Northern Mariana Islands.
(Palestine) Khan Yunis	108	Governorate of Palestine.
Puconci	108	Municipality of Slovenia.
Šmarje pri Jelšah	107.7	Municipality of Slovenia.
Vipava	107.4	Municipality of Slovenia.
Ljutomer	107.2	Municipality of Slovenia.
(North Macedonia) Centar Župa	107	Municipality of North Macedonia.
Walsall	106	Metropolitan borough of England.
Trafford	106	Metropolitan borough of England.
Paris	105	Smallest department of France.
Lobata	105	Second smallest district of São Tomé and Príncipe.
Dravograd	105	Municipality of Slovenia.
Distrito Nacional	104.4	Nacional District of the Dominican Republic.
(Kuwait) Mubarak Al-Kabeer	104	Governorate of Kuwait.
Podvelka	103.9	Municipality of Slovenia.
Velike Lašče	103.2	Municipality of Slovenia.
Tameside	103	Metropolitan borough of England.
Solčava	102.8	Municipality of Slovenia.
Komen	102.7	Municipality of Slovenia.
Montserrat	102	British Overseas Territory.
Gros Islet	101	Largest district of Saint Lucia.
Brazzaville	100	Second smallest department of the Republic of the Congo.
Jūrmala	100	Second largest city of Latvia with separate status (not part of any district).
Bury	99	Metropolitan borough of England.
Saint Andrew Parish	99	Largest parish of Grenada.
Ig	98.8	Municipality of Slovenia.
Dudley	98	Metropolitan borough of England.
Slovenske Konjice	97.8	Municipality of Slovenia.
Salford	97	Metropolitan borough (city) of England.
Knowsley	97	Metropolitan borough of England.
(North Macedonia) Ilinden	97	Municipality of North Macedonia.
Coventry	97	Metropolitan borough (city) of England.
Šentjernej	96	Municipality of Slovenia.
Šoštanj	95.6	Municipality of Slovenia.
Bender, Moldova (Tighina)	95	District-level municipality of Moldova.
Celje	94.9	Municipality of Slovenia.
Dobrepolje	94.9	Municipality of Slovenia.
Šmartno pri Litiji	94.9	Municipality of Slovenia.
Hartlepool	94	Unitary authority of England.
Radlje ob Dravi	93.9	Municipality of Slovenia.
Nevis	93	Smaller of the two main islands of Saint Kitts and Nevis.
Stoke-on-Trent	93	Unitary authority (city) of England.
(North Macedonia) Gazi Baba	92	Municipality of North Macedonia.
Brezovica	91.2	Municipality of Slovenia.
Anguilla	91	British Overseas Territory.
Castries	90.33	Second largest district of Saint Lucia.
Gornji Grad	90.1	Municipality of Slovenia.
Kozje	89.7	Municipality of Slovenia.
Ordino	89	Second largest parish of Andorra.
Preddvor	88.7	Municipality of Slovenia.
Saint Martin	88.4	Island in the Caribbean divided between Saint Martin, the French side, and Sint Maarten, the Dutch side.
(North Macedonia) Krivogaštani	88	Municipality of North Macedonia.
Ascension Island	88	Smallest administrative area (Island Council) of Saint Helena, Ascension and Tristan da Cunha.
Banjul	88	Capital city of The Gambia.
Tuen Mun	87.54	District in Hong Kong
Bujumbura Mairie	87	Smallest province of Burundi.
Manhattan	87	One of the five boroughs of New York City, New York, USA.
Saint Patrick Parish	86.7	Parish of Dominica.
Portsmouth	86.25	Independent City of Virginia.
Grenadines	86	Chain of islands in the Caribbean between Saint Vincent and Grenada.
Sandwell	86	Metropolitan borough of England.
Rota Municipality	85.39	Smallest municipality of the Northern Mariana Islands.
Carrickfergus	85	Third smallest district of Northern Ireland.
(North Macedonia) Debar	85	Municipality of North Macedonia.
(Kuwait) Hawalli	85	Governorate of Kuwait.
Sauvie Island	84.8	An island in the Columbia River.
Lovrenc na Pohorju	84.4	Municipality of Slovenia.
Castlereagh	84	Second smallest district of Northern Ireland.
North Tyneside	84	Metropolitan borough of England.
Velenje	83.5	Municipality of Slovenia.
Tunoya	82	An island in the Glomma River.
Saint Thomas	81.09	District of the US Virgin Islands.
Brighton and Hove	82	Unitary authority of England.
Videm	80.2	Municipality of Slovenia.
Plymouth	80	Unitary authority (city) of England.
Saint David Parish	80	Second largest parish of Saint Vincent and the Grenadines.
Dordrecht	79.53	An island but also a city in Holland Diep.
Littoral Department	79	Smallest department of Benin.
Southern Region	78.9	Region of Malta.
Ljubno	78.9	Municipality of Slovenia.
Vianden	78.59	Smallest canton of Luxembourg.
Bălți	78	District-level municipality of Moldova.
Derby	78	Unitary authority (city) of England.
Guernsey	78	Crown dependency of the UK. Includes Alderney, Guernsey, Herm, Sark, and some other smaller islands.
Micoud	78	Third largest district of Saint Lucia.
Cerklje na Gorenjskem	78	Municipality of Slovenia.
Medvode	77.6	Municipality of Slovenia.
Bissau	77.5	Capital and autonomous sector of Guinea-Bissau.
Uvea	77.5	Largest chiefdom of Wallis and Futuna.
Jesenice	75.8	Municipality of Slovenia.
Pesnica	75.8	Municipality of Slovenia.
Vojnik	75.3	Municipality of Slovenia.
Bloke	75.1	Municipality of Slovenia.
Gornja Radgona	75	Municipality of Slovenia.
Nottingham	75	Unitary authority (city) of England.
Lukovica	74.9	Municipality of Slovenia.
Western District, American Samoa	74.781	District of American Samoa.
Halton	74	Unitary authority of England.
Encamp	74	Third largest parish of Andorra.
Grand Island	73.8	An island in the Niagara River.
Leicester	73	Unitary authority (city) of England.
Majšperk	72.8	Municipality of Slovenia.
Domžale	72.3	Municipality of Slovenia.
Daugavpils	72	Third largest city of Latvia with separate status (not part of any district).
Bled	72	Municipality of Slovenia.
North Down	72	Smallest district of Northern Ireland.
Brda	72	Municipality of Slovenia.
Port Said Governorate	72	Second smallest governorate of Egypt.
Kidričevo	71.5	Municipality of Slovenia.
Rogaška Slatina	71.5	Municipality of Slovenia.
Šalovci	71.5	Municipality of Slovenia.
Kingston upon Hull	71	Unitary authority (city) of England.
Mokronog-Trebelno	71	Municipality of Slovenia.
Dennery	70	District of Saint Lucia.
(Palestine) Gaza	70	Governorate of Palestine.
Kentucky Bend	69.6	Exclave of Kentucky cut off by the Mississippi River, surrounded by Missouri and Tennessee.
Sha Tin	69.27	District in Hong Kong
Wolverhampton	69	Metropolitan borough (city) of England.
Jezersko	68.8	Municipality of Slovenia.
Gozo	68.7	Region of Malta.
Capital Governorate	68	Governorate of Bahrain.
(Australia) Jervis Bay Territory	67.8	Internal territory of Australia
Eastern District, American Samoa	67.027	District of American Samoa.
Bangui	67	Commune of the Central African Republic.
Kowloon	67	One of the three areas of Hong Kong.
Ptuj	67	Municipality of Slovenia.
Zreče	67	Municipality of Slovenia.
Saint John Parish	66.96	Largest parish of Antigua and Barbuda.
Gornji Petrovci	66.8	Municipality of Slovenia.
Saint Paul Parish	66.4	Parish of Dominica.
Šentilj	65.01	Municipality of Slovenia.
Rangitata Island	65	An island in the Rangitata River.
Ngeremlengui	65	Largest state of Palau.
Dundee City council area	65	Smallest unitary district (city) of Scotland.
Vitanje	65	Municipality of Slovenia.
Poole	65	Unitary authority of England.
(Palestine) Rafah	65	Governorate of Palestine.
Saint George Parish	65	Second largest parish of Grenada.
Selnica ob Dravi	64.5	Municipality of Slovenia.
Murska Sobota	64.4	Municipality of Slovenia.
South Tyneside	64	Metropolitan borough of England.
Saint Mary Parish	63.55	Second largest parish of Antigua and Barbuda.
Ravne na Koroškem	63.4	Municipality of Slovenia.
(North Macedonia) Gjorče Petrov	63	Municipality of North Macedonia.
Torbay	63	Unitary authority of England.
Miren-Kostanjevica	62.8	Municipality of Slovenia.
Tsuen Wan	62.62	District in Hong Kong
Beltinci	62.2	Municipality of Slovenia.
Lenart	62	Municipality of Slovenia.
Pitcairn Islands	62	British Overseas Territory in Oceania composed of several islands including Pitcairn Island.
Bristol County	62	County of Rhode Island.
Moravče	61.4	Municipality of Slovenia.
Gorišnica	61.2	Municipality of Slovenia.
(North Macedonia) Butel	61	Municipality of North Macedonia.
(Palestine) North Gaza	61	Governorate of Palestine.
San Marino	61	Country in Europe.
Amsterdam Island/Saint Paul Island	61	Second smallest district of the French Southern and Antarctic Lands.
La Massana	61	Parish of Andorra.
Ruše	60.8	Municipality of Slovenia.
Podčetrtek	60.6	Municipality of Slovenia.
Koror	60.52	Second largest state of Palau.
Škocjan	60.4	Municipality of Slovenia.
British Indian Ocean Territory	60	British Territory Island.
Ostrovo, Požarevac	60	An island in the Danube River.
Hogg Island	60	An island at the beginning of the Essequibo River.
Jelgava	60	City of Latvia with separate status (not part of any district).
Liepāja	60	Third smallest city of Latvia with separate status (not part of any district).
Sant Julià de Lòria	60	Parish of Andorra.
Saint Philip	60	Largest parish of Barbados.
Chaguanas	59.65	Largest municipality of Trinidad and Tobago.
Ribnica na Pohorju	59.3	Municipality of Slovenia.
Saint John Parish	59.1	Parish of Dominica.
Manhattan	59	Smallest borough of New York City.
Petersburg	58.85	Independent City of Virginia.
Hrastnik	58.6	Municipality of Slovenia.
Prevalje	58.1	Municipality of Slovenia.
Kostanjevica na Krki	58	Municipality of Slovenia.
Trbovlje	57.8	Municipality of Slovenia.
Galway City	57.3	Local Authority in the Republic of Ireland.
Muharraq Governorate	57	Smallest governorate of Bahrain.
Christ Church	57	Second largest parish of Barbados.
Manu'a	56.688	District of American Samoa.
Saint George Parish	56.2	Parish of Dominica.
Kostel	56.09	Municipality of Slovenia.
(Palestine) Deir al-Balah	56	Governorate of Palestine.
Tortola	55.7	Largest district of the British Virgin Islands.
Braslovče	55	Municipality of Slovenia.
Luxor Governorate	55	Smallest governorate of Egypt.
Middlesbrough	54	Unitary authority of England.
(North Macedonia) Plasnica	54	Municipality of North Macedonia.
Hoče-Slivnica	53.7	Municipality of Slovenia.
Apače	53.5	Municipality of Slovenia.
Mozirje	53.5	Municipality of Slovenia.
Vransko	53.3	Municipality of Slovenia.
Saint Martin	53	French Territory Island.
Bermuda	54	Overseas territory of the UK in North America.
Ngardmau	53	Third largest state of Palau.
San Andrés and Providencia Department	52	Smallest department of Colombia.
Saint George Parish	52	Parish of Saint Vincent and the Grenadines.
Radeče	52	Municipality of Slovenia.
Aimeliik	52	State of Palau.
(North Macedonia) Zrnovci	52	Municipality of North Macedonia.
Staunton	51.59	Independent City of Virginia.
Sveti Jurij ob Ščavnici	51.3	Municipality of Slovenia.
Rače-Fram	51.2	Municipality of Slovenia.
Saint John	51	District of the US Virgin Islands.
Soufrière	50.51	District of Saint Lucia.
Vuzenica	50.1	Municipality of Slovenia.
Pointe-Noire	50	Smallest department of the Republic of the Congo.
Southampton	50	Unitary authority (city) of England.
Sodražica	49.5	Municipality of Slovenia.
United States Minor Outlying Islands	49.26	Statistical designation of groups of islands controlled by the United States in the Pacific Ocean.
Bouvet Island	49	Norway Antarctica Territory Islands.
Kungota	49	Municipality of Slovenia.
Šentrupert	49	Municipality of Slovenia.
Žiri	49	Municipality of Slovenia.
Barceloneta	48.41	Municipality of Puerto Rico.
Hakupu	48.04	Village of Niue.
Mirna Peč	48	Municipality of Slovenia.
Alo	47.5	Chiefdom of Wallis and Futuna.
Escaldes-Engordany	47	Parish of Andorra.
Ngatpang	47	State of Palau.
Alofi North	46.48	Village of Niue.
Alofi South	46.48	Village of Niue.
Križevci	46.2	Municipality of Slovenia.
Bournemouth	46	Unitary authority of England.
(Montenegro) Tivat	46	Municipality of Montenegro.
Ventspils	46	Second smallest city of Latvia with separate status (not part of any district).
Podlehnik	46	Municipality of Slovenia.
Saint Paul Parish	45.27	Third largest parish of Antigua and Barbuda.
Guantanamo Bay	45	Island of Cuba under United States control.
Prince Edward Island	45	Sub-antarctic territory of South Africa.
Harrisonburg	44.91	Independent City of Virginia.
Saint David Parish	44	Third largest parish of Grenada.
Airai	44	State of Palau.
Piran	44	Municipality of Slovenia.
Saint George	44	Third largest parish of Barbados.
Vieux Fort	43.77	District of Saint Lucia.
Nazarje	43.4	Municipality of Slovenia.
Škofljica	43.3	Municipality of Slovenia.
Luton	43	Unitary authority of England.
Grenadines Parish	43	Parish of Saint Vincent and the Grenadines.
(North Macedonia) Kisela Voda	43	Municipality of North Macedonia.
Nukulaelae (Total area)	43	Atoll and administrative district of Tuvalu.
City of Manila	42.88	Capital city of the Philippines.
Žirovnica	42.6	Municipality of Slovenia.
Borovnica	42.3	Municipality of Slovenia.
Southend-on-Sea	42	Unitary authority of England.
Saint Patrick Parish	42	Parish of Grenada.
Liku	41.64	Village of Niue.
Prebold	41	Municipality of Slovenia.
Saint Philip Parish	40.67	Parish of Antigua and Barbuda.
Šenčur	40.3	Municipality of Slovenia.
Rogašovci	40.1	Municipality of Slovenia.
Ngchesar	40	State of Palau.
Reading	40	Unitary authority of England.
Portsmouth	40	Unitary authority (city) of England.
Duplek	40	Municipality of Slovenia.
Poquoson	39.77	Independent City of Virginia.
Southern	39.4	District in Hong Kong
Florida	39.39	Municipality of Puerto Rico.
Saint Michael	39	Parish of Barbados.
Arroyo	38.87	Municipality of Puerto Rico.
Muta	38.8	Municipality of Slovenia.
Tišina	38.8	Municipality of Slovenia.
Waynesboro	38.77	Independent City of Virginia.
Alexandria	38.68	Independent City of Virginia.
Anegada	38.6	Second largest district of the British Virgin Islands.
Scattered Islands in the Indian Ocean	38.6	Smallest district of the French Southern and Antarctic Lands.
Sveti Tomaž	38.09	Municipality of Slovenia.
(North Macedonia) Aračinovo	38	Municipality of North Macedonia.
Žetale	38	Municipality of Slovenia.
Laborie	38	District of Saint Lucia.
Carriacou and Petite Martinique	37.7	Dependency of Grenada.
Salem	37.6	Independent City of Virginia.
Poljčane	37.5	Municipality of Slovenia.
Grad	37.4	Municipality of Slovenia.
Sveta Ana	37.2	Municipality of Slovenia.
Rincón	37.01	Municpality of Puerto Rico.
Basel-Stadt	37	Smallest canton of Switzerland.
Saint Patrick Parish	37	Second smallest parish of Saint Vincent and the Grenadines.
Makole	36.9	Municipality of Slovenia.
Juršinci	36.3	Municipality of Slovenia.
South Eastern Region	36.2	Region of Malta.
Osilnica	36.2	Municipality of Slovenia.
Norfolk Island	36	Self-governing area of Australia.
Saint Andrew	36	Parish of Barbados.
Saint Lucy	36	Parish of Barbados.
Blackpool	35	Third smallest unitary authority of England.
Saint John Parish	35	Second smallest parish of Grenada.
(North Macedonia) Vevčani	35	Municipality of North Macedonia.
Tabor	34.8	Municipality of Slovenia.
Destrnik	34.4	Municipality of Slovenia.
Radenci	34.1	Municipality of Slovenia.
Sint Maarten	34	Dutch Territory.
Polzela	34	Municipality of Slovenia.
Starše	34	Municipality of Slovenia.
Sveti Jurij v Slovenskih Goricah	34	Municipality of Slovenia.
Šmarješke Toplice	34	Municipality of Slovenia.
Ngaraard	34	State of Palau.
Saint John	34	Tied for third smallest parish of Barbados.
Saint Peter	34	Tied for third smallest parish of Barbados.
Črenšovci	33.7	Municipality of Slovenia.
Bristol	33.34	Independent City of Virginia.
Dol pri Ljubljani	33.3	Municipality of Slovenia.
Oplotnica	33.2	Municipality of Slovenia.
Spanish possessions in North Africa	33	Possessions of Spain in North Africa.
Središče ob Dravi	32.7	Municipality of Slovenia.
Saint Peter Parish	32.6	Third smallest parish of Dominica.
Horjul	32.5	Municipality of Slovenia.
Saint Peter Parish	32.37	Second smallest parish of Antigua and Barbuda.
Cirkulane	32.07	Municipality of Slovenia.
Lakshadweep	32	Smallest union territory of India.
Saint James Windward Parish	32	Largest parish of Saint Kitts and Nevis.
Dobrna	31.7	Municipality of Slovenia.
Vodice	31.4	Municipality of Slovenia.
Mirna	31.3	Municipality of Slovenia.
Bistrica ob Sotli	31.1	Municipality of Slovenia.
Dobrovnik	31.1	Municipality of Slovenia.
Anse la Raye	31	Second smallest district of Saint Lucia.
Choiseul	31	Second smallest district of Saint Lucia.
Kalawao County	31	County of Hawaii.
Saint James	31	Second smallest parish of Barbados.
Cankova	30.6	Municipality of Slovenia.
Rečica ob Savinji	30.1	Municipality of Slovenia.
Culebra	30.1	Municipality of Puerto Rico.
Markovci	29.8	Municipality of Slovenia.
Triesenberg	29.8	Largest municipality of Liechtenstein.
Renče-Vogrsko	29.5	Municipality of Slovenia.
Hormigueros	29.37	Municipality of Puerto Rico.
Saint Andrew Parish	29	Smallest parish of Saint Vincent and the Grenadines.
Straža	29	Municipality of Slovenia.
Saint George Basseterre Parish	29	Second largest parish of Saint Kitts and Nevis.
Macau	28.6	Special administrative region of the People's Republic of China.
Izola	28.6	Municipality of Slovenia.
Dornava	28.4	Municipality of Slovenia.
Martinsville	28.37	Independent City of Virginia.
Naklo	28.3	Municipality of Slovenia.
Štore	28.1	Municipality of Slovenia.
Avarua	28	A district and town of the Cook Islands.
Fredericksburg	27.07	Independent City of Virginia.
Slough	27	Second smallest unitary authority of England.
Hopewell	26.82	Independent City of Virginia.
Schaan	26.8	Second largest municipality of Liechtenstein.
Charlottesville	26.55	Independent City of Virginia.
Triesen	26.4	Third largest municipality of Liechtenstein.
Mežica	26.4	Municipality of Slovenia.
Mutalau	26.31	Village of Niue.
Sveta Trojica v Slovenskih Goricah	26.3	Municipality of Slovenia.
Pakri Islands	26.18	Islands part of Estonia.
Ngiwal	26	State of Palau.
Saint Joseph	26	Smallest parish of Barbados.
Tuvalu	26	Country in Oceania.
Manassas	25.49	Independent City of Virginia.
Radford	25.06	Independent City of Virginia.
Saint Mark Parish	25	Smallest parish of Grenada.
Saint John Capisterre Parish	25	Parish of Saint Kitts and Nevis.
Saint George Parish	24.41	Smallest parish of Antigua and Barbuda.
Benedikt	24.1	Municipality of Slovenia.
Komenda	24	Municipality of Slovenia.
Point Fortin	23.88	Second largest municipality of Trinidad and Tobago.
Winchester	23.81	Independent City of Virginia.
Turnišče	23.8	Municipality of Slovenia.
Little Sisters	23.7	Third largest district of the British Virgin Islands.
Central Region	23.6	Region of Malta.
Kwai Tsing	23.34	District in Hong Kong
Williamsburg	23.15	Independent City of Virginia.
Cerkvenjak	23	Municipality of Slovenia.
Trnovska Vas	22.9	Municipality of Slovenia.
Kuzma	22.9	Municipality of Slovenia.
Mengeš	22.5	Municipality of Slovenia.
Peleliu	22.3	State of Palau.
Honiara	22	Capital territory of the Solomon Islands.
Saint John Figtree Parish	22	Parish of Saint Kitts and Nevis.
Nanumea (total area)	22	Atoll and administrative district of Tuvalu.
Kingston Parish	21.8	Smallest parish of Jamaica. The parish of Kingston does not encompass all of the city of Kingston, most of which is in the parish of St. Andrew.
Hajdina	21.6	Municipality of Slovenia.
Lakepa	21.58	Village of Niue.
Franklin	21.44	Independent City of Virginia.
Galax	21.33	Independent City of Virginia.
Virgin Gorda	21.2	Second smallest district of the British Virgin Islands.
(North Macedonia) Karpoš	21	Municipality of North Macedonia.
Nauru	21	Country in Oceania. Smallest republic in the world. Smallest independent Commonwealth state.
Saint Barthélemy	21	Overseas collectivity of France.
Saint Peter Basseterre Parish	21	Parish of Saint Kitts and Nevis.
Sint Eustatius	21	Special municipality of the Kingdom of the Netherlands.
(North Macedonia) Aerodrom	20	Municipality of North Macedonia.
(Malawi) Likoma	20	District of Malawi.
Kobilje	19.7	Municipality of Slovenia.
Balzers	19.6	Municipality of Liechtenstein.
Colonial Heights	19.48	Independent City of Virginia.
Norton	19.37	Independent City of Virginia.
Zavrč	19.3	Municipality of Slovenia.
Velika Polana	18.7	Municipality of Slovenia.
San Fernando City Corporation	18.64	Municipality of Trinidad and Tobago.
Šmartno ob Paki	18.2	Municipality of Slovenia.
Eastern	18.13	District in Hong Kong
Hodoš	18.1	Municipality of Slovenia.
Christ Church Nichola Town Parish	18	Parish of Saint Kitts and Nevis.
Saint George Gingerland Parish	18	Parish of Saint Kitts and Nevis.
Saint Thomas Lowland Parish	18	Parish of Saint Kitts and Nevis.
Emporia	17.88	Independent City of Virginia.
Sveti Andraž v Slovenskih Goricah	17.6	Municipality of Slovenia.
Grand Turk	17.6	Second smallest administrative district of the Turks and Caicos Islands.
Dobje	17.5	Municipality of Slovenia.
Vaduz	17.3	Municipality of Liechtenstein.
Makefu	17.13	Village of Niue.
(Equatorial Guinea) Annobón	17	Province of Equatorial Guinea.
Rēzekne	17	Smallest city of Latvia with separate status (not part of any district).
Nui (Total area)	17	Atoll and administrative district of Tuvalu.
Sigave	16.75	Smallest chiefdom of Wallis and Futuna.
Buena Vista	16.67	Independent City of Virginia.
Água Grande	16.5	Smallest district of São Tomé and Príncipe.
Fairfax	16.16	Independent City of Virginia.
Isles of Scilly	16.03	Smallest unitary authority of England.
Trinity Palmetto Point Parish	16	Parish of Saint Kitts and Nevis.
Canaries	16	Smallest district of Saint Lucia.
Saint Mary Cayon Parish	15	Parish of Saint Kitts and Nevis.
Saint Ouen Parish	15	Largest parish of Jersey.
Ailinglaplap Atoll	15	Atoll and administrative district of Marshall Islands.
Kwajalein Atoll	15	Atoll and administrative district of Marshall Islands.
Mili Atoll	15	Atoll and administrative district of Marshall Islands.
Šempeter-Vrtojba	15	Municipality of Slovenia.
Covington	14.16	Independent City of Virginia.
Cocos (Keeling) Islands	14	An Australian external territory in the Indian Ocean.
Saint Paul Capisterre Parish	14	Parish of Saint Kitts and Nevis.
Avatele	13.99	Village of Niue.
Wake Island	13.8	An atoll claimed by the Marshall Islands but administrated by the United States of America.
Saint Mark Parish	13.5	Second smallest parish of Dominica.
Port of Spain	13.45	Second smallest municipality of Trinidad and Tobago.
Saba	13	Special municipality of the Kingdom of the Netherlands.
Saint Anne Sandy Point Parish	13	Second smallest parish of Saint Kitts and Nevis.
Arno Atoll	13	Atoll and administrative district of Marshall Islands.
Saint Brélade Parish	12.8	Second largest parish of Jersey.
Central and Western	12.55	District in Hong Kong
Cataño	12.55	Municipality of Puerto Rico.
Tuapa	12.54	Village of Niue.
Miklavž na Dravskem Polju	12.5	Municipality of Slovenia.
Trinity Parish	12.3	Third largest parish of Jersey.
Veržej	12	Municipality of Slovenia.
Andorra la Vella	12	Smallest parish of Andorra.
Tamakautoga	11.93	Village of Niue.
Palmyra Atoll	11.9	An atoll which is a territory of the United States of America.
Saint Peter Parish	11.6	Parish of Jersey.
Kwun Tong	11.28	District in Hong Kong
Arima	11.15	Smallest municipality of Trinidad and Tobago.
Melekeok	11	State of Palau.
Log-Dragomer	11	Municipality of Slovenia.
Jaluit Atoll	11	Atoll and administrative district of Marshall Islands.
Tokelau	10.8	Territory of New Zealand.
Saint Luke Parish	10.8	Smallest parish of Dominica.
Wan Chai	10.64	District in Hong Kong
Saint Helier Parish	10.6	Parish of Jersey.
Serravalle (San Marino)	10.53	Largest municipality of San Marino.
Eschen	10.3	Municipality of Liechtenstein.
Saint Martin Parish	10.3	Parish of Jersey.
Castel Parish	10.2	Largest parish of Guernsey.
Hikutavake	10.17	Village of Niue.
Kowloon City	10.02	District in Hong Kong
Ngarchelong	10	State of Palau.
Vaitupu	10	Atoll and administrative district of Tuvalu.
Likiep Atoll	10	Atoll and administrative district of Marshall Islands.
Majuro Atoll	10	Atoll and administrative district of Marshall Islands.
Maloelap Atoll	10	Atoll and administrative district of Marshall Islands.
Razkrižje	9.8	Municipality of Slovenia.
Saint Lawrence Parish	9.5	Parish of Jersey.
Sham Shui Po	9.36	District in Hong Kong
Saint Saviour Parish	9.3	Parish of Jersey.
Wong Tai Sin	9.3	District in Hong Kong
Salt Cay	9.1	Smallest administrative district of the Turks and Caicos Islands.
Borgo Maggiore	9.01	Second largest municipality of San Marino.
Šarengrad	9	An island in the Danube, Disputed between Croatia and Serbia
Vale Parish	8.9	Second largest parish of Guernsey.
Saint John Parish	8.7	Parish of Jersey.
Trzin	8.6	Municipality of Slovenia.
Yeouido	8.4	An island in Seoul, South Korea.
Jost Van Dyke	8.3	Smallest district of the British Virgin Islands.
Ankaran	8	Municipality of Slovenia.
Angaur	8	State of Palau.
Rongelap Atoll	8	Atoll and administrative district of Marshall Islands.
Wotje Atoll	8	Atoll and administrative district of Marshall Islands.
Manassas Park	7.86	Independent City of Virginia.
Grouville Parish	7.8	Third smallest parish of Jersey.
Faetano	7.75	Third largest municipality of San Marino.
Paracel Islands	7.75	Disputed islands in the South China Sea.
Coloane	7.6	One of the two largest parishes of Macau.
Taipa	7.6	One of the two largest parishes of Macau.
(North Macedonia) Centar	7.52	Municipality of North Macedonia.
Mauren	7.5	Municipality of Liechtenstein.
(North Macedonia) Šuto Orizari	7.48	Municipality of North Macedonia.
Ruggell	7.38	Municipality of Liechtenstein.
Saint Martin Parish	7.3	Third largest parish of Guernsey.
City of San Marino	7.09	Municipality of San Marino.
Glorioso Islands	7	Scattered islands in the Indian Ocean, part of the French Southern and Antarctic Lands.
Liberland	7	An island disputed between Croatia and Serbia. It is an unclaimed territory.
Pinnacle Islands	7	Group of uninhabited islands in the East China Sea, disputed by Japan, the People's Republic of China and the Republic of China.
Ostrov Tatyshev	7	An island in the city of Krasnoyarsk, Russia.
Yau Tsim Mong	6.99	District in Hong Kong
Odranci	6.9	Municipality of Slovenia.
Gibraltar	6.8	British Overseas Territory.
Domagnano	6.62	Municipality of San Marino.
St. George's Parish, Bermuda	6.6	Largest parish of Bermuda.
Fiorentino	6.57	Municipality of San Marino.
Lexington	6.54	Independent City of Virginia.
Saint Mary Parish	6.5	Second smallest parish of Jersey.
Saint Peter Port Parish	6.5	Parish of Guernsey.
Saint Saviour Parish	6.4	Parish of Guernsey.
Midway Islands	6.2	Minor outlying island of the United States.
Saint Peter Parish	6.2	Parish of Guernsey.
Gamprin	6.1	Third smallest municipality of Liechtenstein.
Saint Sampson Parish	6	Parish of Guernsey.
Aur Atoll	6	Atoll and administrative district of Marshall Islands.
Ebon Atoll	6	Atoll and administrative district of Marshall Islands.
Enewetak Atoll	6	Atoll and administrative district of Marshall Islands.
Namu Atoll	6	Atoll and administrative district of Marshall Islands.
Clipperton Island	6	Only minor overseas territory of France.
Devonshire Parish	5.97	Tied for smallest parish of Bermuda.
Hamilton Parish	5.97	Tied for smallest parish of Bermuda.
Paget Parish	5.97	Tied for smallest parish of Bermuda.
Pembroke Parish	5.97	Tied for smallest parish of Bermuda.
Sandys Parish	5.97	Tied for smallest parish of Bermuda.
Smith's Parish	5.97	Tied for smallest parish of Bermuda.
Southampton Parish	5.97	Tied for smallest parish of Bermuda.
Warwick Parish	5.97	Tied for smallest parish of Bermuda.
Chiesanuova	5.46	Third smallest municipality of San Marino.
Navassa Island	5.4	An island administrated by the United States but claimed by Haiti.
Vaiea	5.4	Village of Niue.
Falls Church	5.3	Independent City in Virginia.
Planken	5.3	Second smallest municipality of Liechtenstein.
Ashmore and Cartier Islands	5	External territory of Australia.
Sedudu Island	5	An island in the Chobe River.
Spratly Islands	5	Disputed islands in the South China Sea.
Ailuk Atoll	5	Atoll and administrative district of Marshall Islands.
Acquaviva	4.86	Second smallest municipality of San Marino.
Ada Bojana	4.81	An Island in the Ulcinj Municipality, Montenegro.
Toi	4.77	Village of Niue.
Jarvis Island	4.5	An island which is a territory of the United States of America.
Saint Andrew Parish	4.4	Third smallest parish of Guernsey.
Hayden Island	4.4	An Island in the Columbia River Between Vancouver, WA and Portland, OR.
Forest Parish	4.2	Second smallest parish of Guernsey.
Saint Clement Parish	4.2	Smallest parish of Jersey.
Saint Paul Charlestown Parish	4	Smallest parish of Saint Kitts and Nevis.
Wotho Atoll	4	Atoll and administrative district of Marshall Islands.
Nanumea (Land area only)	3.87	Atoll and administrative district of Tuvalu.
(North Macedonia) Čair	3.52	Municipality of North Macedonia.
Neutral Moresnet	3.5	Former neutral territory between Belgium, the Netherlands, and Germany. Existed between 1816 and 1920.
Schellenberg	3.5	Smallest municipality of Liechtenstein.
Sé, Macau	3.4	Third largest parish of Macau.
Nui (Land area only)	3.37	Atoll and administrative district of Tuvalu.
Montegiardino	3.31	Smallest municipality of San Marino.
Nossa Senhora de Fátima, Macau	3.2	Parish of Macau.
Sonsorol	3.12	Third smallest state of Palau.
Anibare District	3.1	One of the two largest districts of Nauru.
Meneng District	3.1	One of the two largest districts of Nauru.
Torteval Parish	3.1	Smallest parish of Guernsey.
Namorik Atoll	3	Atoll and administrative district of Marshall Islands.
Coral Sea Islands	3	External territory of Australia.
Nukufetau (Land area only)	2.99	Atoll and administrative district of Tuvalu.
City of London	2.9	Smallest county (or equivalent) in the United Kingdom.
Nanjido	2.8	An island in Seoul, South Korea.
Johnston Atoll	2.67	An island which is a territory of the United States of America.
Buada District	2.6	Third largest district of Nauru.
Howland Island	2.6	An island which is a territory of the United States of America.
Ostrov Otdykha	2.5	An island in the city of Krasnoyarsk, Russia.
Swains Island	2.43	Island of American Samoa.
Baker Island	2.1	An island which is a territory of the United States of America.
Monaco	2.02	Country in Europe; smallest French speaking country.
Ujae Atoll	2	Atoll and administrative district of Marshall Islands.
Utirik Atoll	2	Atoll and administrative district of Marshall Islands.
Nibok District	1.6	District of Nauru.
Redonda	1.6	Dependency of Antigua and Barbuda.
Anabar District	1.5	District of Nauru.
Yaren District	1.5	District of Nauru.
Wheeling Island	1.5	An Island in the Ohio River in West Virginia.
Namukulu	1.48	Village of Niue.
Kayangel	1.4	Second smallest state of Palau.
Rŭngrado	1.3	An island in Pyongyang, North Korea.
Baitsi District	1.2	District of Nauru.
Ewa District	1.2	District of Nauru.
Yanggakdo	1.2	An island in Pyongyang, North Korea.
Santo António, Macau	1.1	Third smallest parish of Macau.
Ijuw District	1.1	District of Nauru.
Aiwo District	1.1	District of Nauru.
Anetan District	1	District of Nauru.
São Lourenço, Macau	1	Second smallest parish of Macau.
St. George's, Bermuda	1	Estimate; largest municipality of Bermuda.
Lae Atoll	1	Atoll and administrative district of Marshall Islands.
Denigomodu District	0.9	Third smallest district of Nauru.
Uaboe District	0.8	Second smallest district of Nauru.
Rockall	0.784	An uninhabitable islet in the North Atlantic Ocean.
Hamilton, Bermuda	0.7	Smallest municipality of Bermuda.
Nakanoshima	0.7	An island in the Kyu-Yodo River in Osaka.
Zhenbao Island	0.7	An island in the Ussuri River.
São Lázaro	0.64	Smallest parish of Macau.
Monte-Carlo	0.61	Largest commune of Monaco.
Bhavani Island	0.53	An island in the Krishna River.
Boe District	0.5	Smallest district of Nauru.
Vatican City	0.44	Country in Europe; smallest country in the world.
Larvotto	0.337	Second largest commune of Monaco.
Fontvieille	0.335	Third largest commune of Monaco.
Just Room Enough Island	0.31	The smallest inhabited island in the world, also known as the Hub Island, it is located in New York, United States.
Little Saint James	0.3	An island in the US Virgin Islands.
La Condamine	0.295	Commune of Monaco.
Bamseom	0.24	An island in the Han River.
Île de la Cité	0.2	An island in Central Paris, France.
Nakasu	0.2	An island in the Nakagawa River.
Prince's Island Park	0.2	An island in Bow River.
Monaco-Ville	0.196	Commune of Monaco.
La Rousse	0.177	Commune of Monaco.
La Colle	0.176	Commune of Monaco.
Hatfield Island	0.17	An island in the Guyandotte River.
Saint Michel	0.142	Third smallest commune of Monaco.
Moneghetti	0.104	Second smallest commune of Monaco.
Les Révoires	0.076	Smallest commune of Monaco.
Liberty Island	0.06	Federally-owned island in New York City.
Rose Atoll	0.05	Atoll within the American Samoa.
Vukovar	0.032	A disputed Danube Island between Croatia and Serbia.
Kingman Reef	0.03	A submerged reef which is a territory of the United States of America.
Ravin de Sainte-Dévote	0.0234	Smallest ward of Monaco and smallest first level administrative subdivision in the world.
Umananda Island	0.02	An island in the Brahmaputra River.
São João Baptista de Ajudá	0.02	Portuguese colony de facto part of Benin; no formal annexation treaty.
Sovereign Military Order of Malta	0.013	Sovereign entity of international law; Palazzo Malta and Villa Malta, within (but not part of) Rome.
Sebitseom	0.0104	A set of Islands in the Han River in Seoul, South Korea.
Pheasant Island	0.00682	An island disputed between France and Spain.
Republic of Molossia	0.0045	A Micronation located near Dayton, Nevada.
Principality of Sealand	0.004	A Micronation that claims Roughs Tower.

== See also ==
Other divisions

- 0.1 to 1,000,000+ square kilometers
- 1,000,000+ square kilometers

Smaller divisions

- 200,000+ square kilometers • 100,000 to 1,000,000 square kilometers • 50,000 to 200,000 square kilometers • 20,000 to 50,000 square kilometers
- 5,000 to 20,000 square kilometers • 1,000 to 5,000 square kilometers • 0.1 to 1,000 square kilometers
- 500,000 to 1,000,000 square kilometers • 200,000 to 500,000 square kilometers • 100,000 to 200,000 square kilometers
- 50,000 to 100,000 square kilometers • 30,000 to 50,000 square kilometers • 20,000 to 30,000 square kilometers • 10,000 to 20,000 square kilometers
- 7,000 to 10,000 square kilometers • 5,000 to 7,000 square kilometers • 3,000 to 5,000 square kilometers • 1,000 to 3,000 square kilometers
- 250 to 1,000 square kilometers • 50 to 250 square kilometers • Under 50 square kilometers

Other

- List of countries and dependencies by area
- List of largest empires
- List of administrative divisions by country
- Category:Ranked lists of country subdivisions
