= National Register of Historic Places listings in Palau =

Location of Palau in the western Pacific

The National Register of Historic Places in Palau contains six listed sites located in only four of the sixteen states of Palau.

This National Park Service list is complete through NPS recent listings posted November 6, 2026.

== Listings ==
	Name on the Register	Image	Date listed	Location	State	Description
1	Ked Ra Ngchemiangel	Ked Ra Ngchemiangel	September 30, 1976 (#76002196)	CFVQ+JVF, Aimeliik, Palau; 7°26′35″N 134°29′20″E	Aimeliik	A Series of Terraced Hills.
2	Bai Ra Irrai	Bai Ra Irrai	September 30, 1976 (#76002195)	9H66+FC2, Unnamed Road, Airai, Palau; 7°21′40″N 134°33′37″E	Airai	An 1890 Men's Meetinghouse.
3	Meteu 'L Klechem	Meteu 'L Klechem	September 30, 1976 (#76002197)	Address Restricted; 7°29′33″N 134°38′10″E	Melekeok	A Stone Monolith.
4	Odalmelech	Odalmelech	September 30, 1976 (#76002198)	GJ2M+MP7, Ngeruliang, Melekeok, Palau; 7°30′01″N 134°38′02″E	Melekeok	A Stone Monolith Complex
5	Ongeluluul	Ongeluluul	September 30, 1976 (#76002199)	FJVM+M8V, Melekeok, Palau; 7°29′36″N 134°38′05″E	Melekeok	Historic Stone Platform.
6	Peleliu Battlefield	Peleliu Battlefield	February 4, 1985 (#85001754)	Peleliu Island; 7°01′00″N 134°15′00″E	Peleliu	WW2 Era Battlefield.

== See also ==
- List of United States National Historic Landmarks in United States commonwealths and territories, associated states, and foreign states
