= Telephone numbers in Palau =

- Country: Palau
- Continent: Oceania
- Country code: +680
- International access: 011, 012
- Long-distance: 0

Telephone numbers in Palau use the country calling code +680. Both fixed-line and mobile telephone numbers have seven-digit national significant numbers. Fixed-line numbers are geographically allocated among Palau's states, while mobile number ranges are assigned to PT Waves, the Palau National Communications Corporation (PNCC), and Palau Mobile Corporation (PMC). International direct dialing uses the prefix 011 for PT Waves and PNCC and 012 for PMC. The emergency telephone number is 911.

== IDD service ==
011 (PT Waves-Palau Telecoms)
011 (PNCC – Palau National Communications Corporation)
012 (PMC – Palau Mobile Corporation)

== National Significant Numbers (NSN) ==
seven digits (fixed)
seven digits (mobile)

== Area codes in Palau ==
Long-distance call service (PNCC)

LIST OF AREA CODES
Prefix	Location
+680 544 xxxx	Aimeliik State
+680 587 xxxx	Airai State
+680 277 xxxx	Angaur State
+680 876 xxxx	Kayangel State
+680 488 xxxx	Koror State
+680 654 xxxx	Melekeok State
+680 824 xxxx	Ngaraard State
+680 855 xxxx	Ngarchelong State
+680 747 xxxx	Ngardmau State
+680 535 xxxx	Ngatpang State
+680 622 xxxx	Ngchesar State
+680 733 xxxx	Ngaremlengui State
+680 679 xxxx	Ngiwal State
+680 345 xxxx	Peleliu State
+680 255 xxxx	Sonsorol State
+680 255 xxxx	Hatohobei State

== Mobile service ==
LIST OF NUMBER RANGES
Prefix	Operator
+680 880 xxxx	PT Waves
+680 881 xxxx	PT Waves
+680 882 xxxx	PT Waves
+680 883 xxxx	PT Waves
+680 884 xxxx	PT Waves
+680 770 xxxx	PNCC
+680 771 xxxx	PNCC
+680 772 xxxx	PNCC
+680 773 xxxx	PNCC
+680 774 xxxx	PNCC
+680 775 xxxx	PNCC
+680 776 xxxx	PNCC
+680 777 xxxx	PNCC
+680 778 xxxx	PNCC
+680 620 xxxx	PMC
+680 630 xxxx	PMC
+680 640 xxxx	PMC
+680 660 xxxx	PMC
+680 680 xxxx	PMC
+680 690 xxxx	PMC

== Emergency call service ==
911

== Local call service ==
1~9

== Company code (carrier code) ==
PT Waves (Palau Telecoms)
Palau National Communications Corporation (PNCC)
Palau Mobile Corporation (PMC)

== See also ==
- Telecommunications in Palau
