= Melekeok (town) =

- City
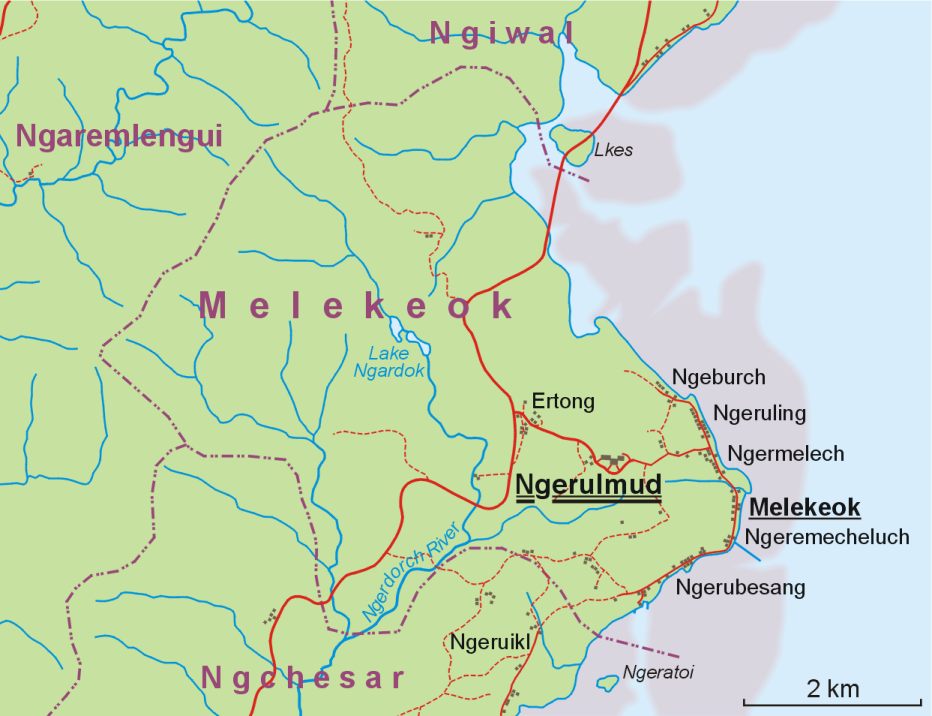
- Location within Melekeok State

- Location in Palau
- Coordinates: 7°30′2.32″N 134°37′26.73″E
- Country: Palau
- State: Melekeok

Population (2005)
  - Total: 271
- Time zone: UTC+9 (Palau Standard Time)
- Area code: (+680) 654

Melekeok (English: /ˈmɛləˌkeɪˌɔːk/) is a town in the State of Melekeok (one of Palau's sixteen states). It is located on the east coast of Palau's largest island, Babeldaob.

== Demographics ==
According to the 2005 census, 271 people resided in Melekeok town.

== Sights ==
In Melekeok Odalmelech, an old monolith, can be visited.

== Gallery ==
Flag of Melekeok

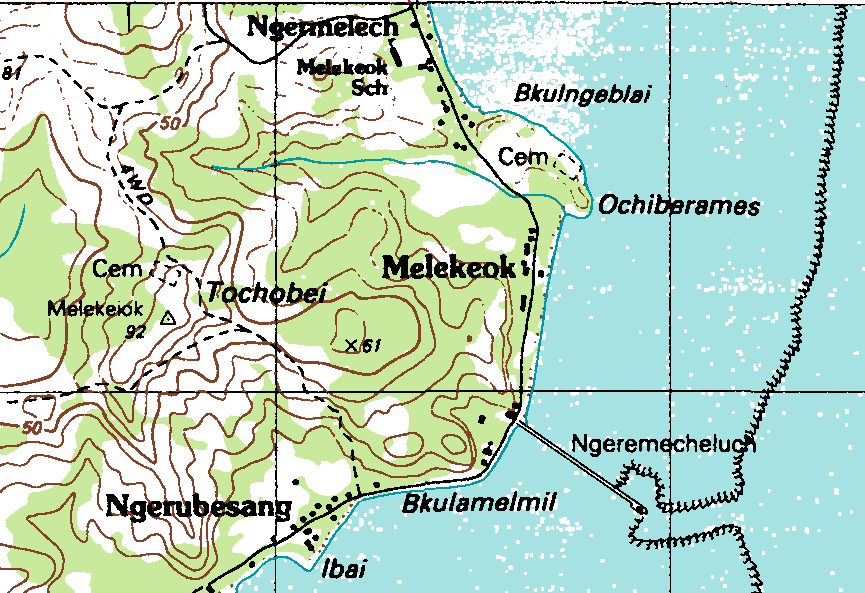
Melekeok area on topographic map

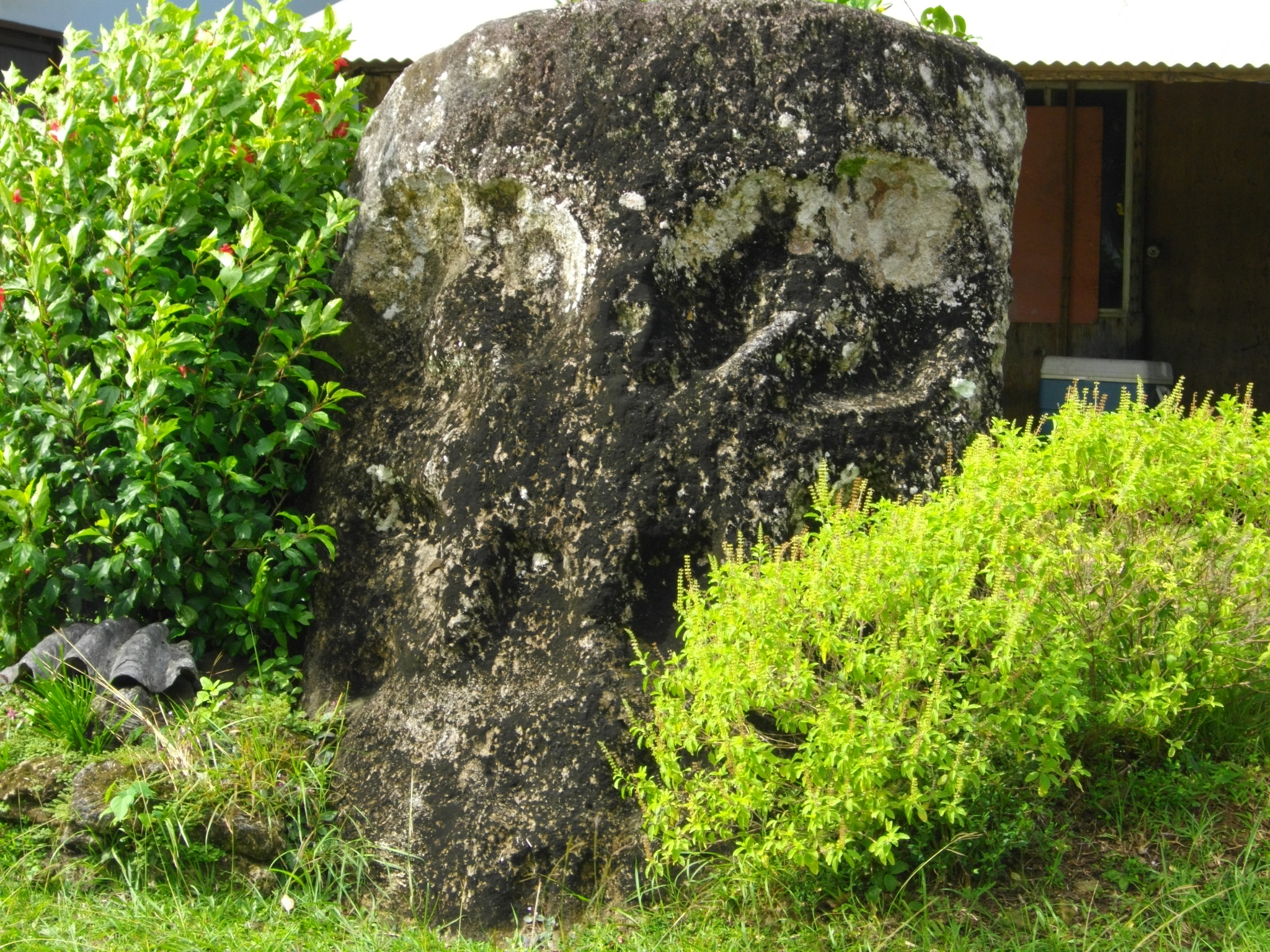
Odalmelech monolith
