= Ngatpang =

Coordinates: 7°28′N 134°32′E

Ngatpang Ngatpard
- State
- Ngatpang
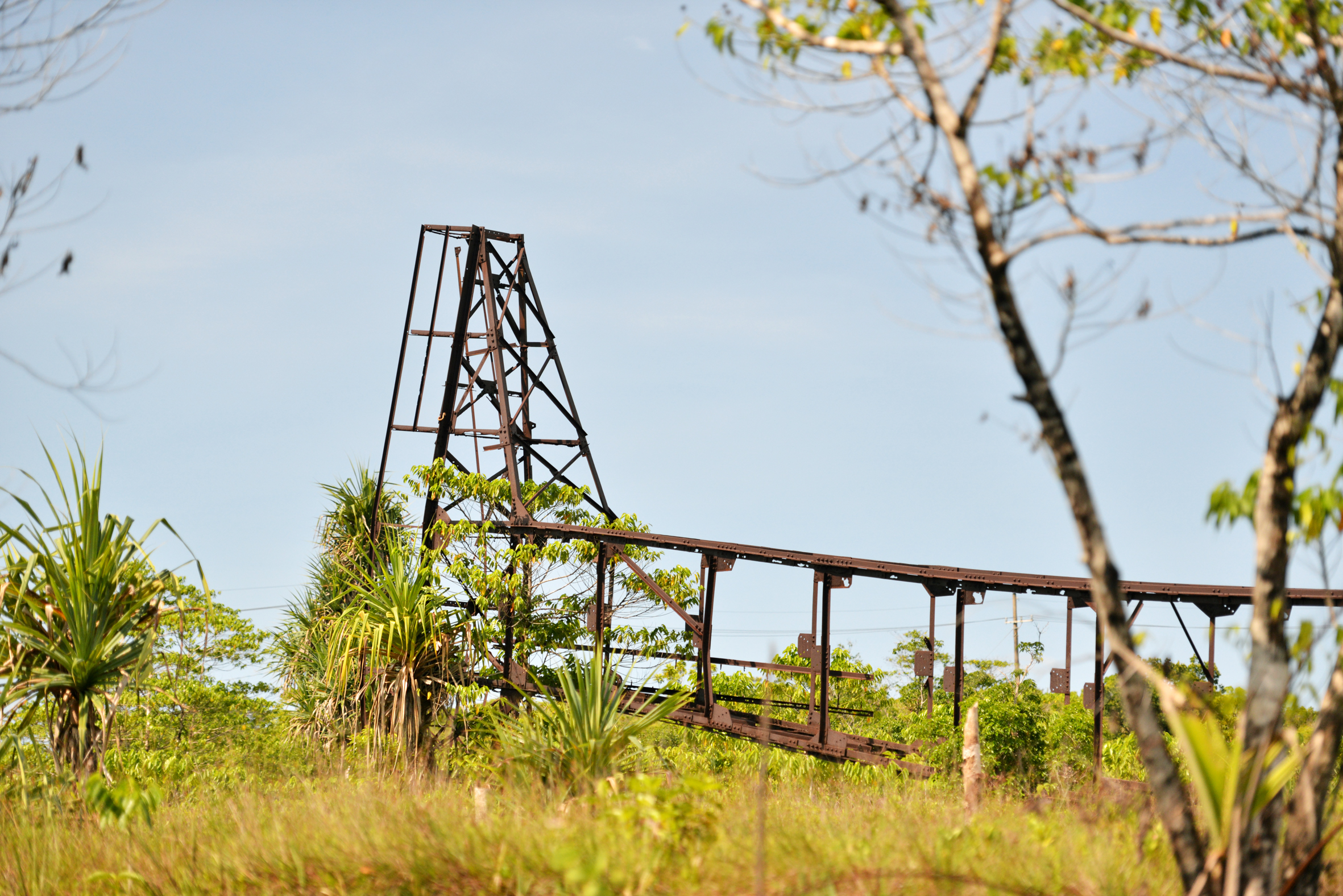
- Radio tower of Japanese army, Ngatpang State

- Flag

- Location of Ngatpang in Palau
- Country: Palau
- 1st Constitutional Convention: January 25, 1982
- Capital: Ngereklmadel

Government
  - Body: Ngatpang State Legislature
  - Governor: Jersey Iyar

Area
  - Total: 47 km^{2} (18 sq mi)

Population (2020 Census)
  - Total: 289
  - Density: 6.1/km^{2} (16/sq mi)
  - Official languages: Palauan; English
  - Summer (DST): Palau Time – PWTTime Zone (Standard Time)
- Postal code: 96940
- Area code: 535
- ISO 3166 code: PW-224

Ngatpang is one of Palau's sixteen states. It comprises an area of around 47 square kilometers in the west of Palau's largest island, Babeldaob, facing onto Ngeremeduu Bay. It has a population of 282, making it Palau's 9th largest state in population.

Ibobang is in Ngatpang. It is a community dedicated to the practice of the Modekngei religion.

== Geography ==
Ngatpang, which is located on the central west coast, includes a very large area of the interior to the southeast of Ngeremeduu Bay. Along the west coast, Ngatpang includes the narrow strip of land between Ngeremeduu Bay and the lagoon. This strip of land was ceded to Ngatpang from Aimeliik early in this century. The modern village of Mechebechubel is located in Ngereklmadel on the west coast on the south face of Roisengas. The terrain along this portion of the west coast is very rugged with steep slopes covered with thick forests. On the east side of Ngeremeduu Bay, Ngatpang extends to the Rael Kedam, the central divide on Babeldaob Island. The edges of the bay are lined with a thick fringe of mangrove swamp forest. Inland are rolling hills with short drainages. Many of the hills facing the bay are grass covered, but further inland the hills are covered with an upland forest. To the north lies the drainage of the Ngerbechederngul River, frequently referred to as the Yamato River . The major tributary of the Ngerbechederngul from Ngatpang is the Ngcholetel. In the southern part of the State are the drainages of the Ngatpang and Tabecheding Rivers. The Ngetmiich River, the largest tributary of the Tabecheding, drains the large interior region in the southeast part of the State. Along the edges of the bay, on the lower slopes of the hills, are deep, loamy soils which contain rich deposits of clay. South of the bay on the upland hills, the soils are thin and associated with scrub vegetation. Also associated with thin soils in low lying and poorly drained basins are bogs.

Presently, most of the use of the land in Ngatpang is confined to gardens surrounding the modern villages of Mechebechubel and Ibobang. Interspersed with these kitchen gardens are stands of agroforest which include coconut, and betelnut, breadfruit, almond trees, and banana plants. In and around many of the uninhabited villages are stands of coconut and betelnut palms, and occasionally patches of irregularly attended taro swamp gardens. Except for occasional forays to hunt pigeon or harvest special plants, there is little active use of most of the interior of Ngatpang.

== Demography ==
The population of the state was 282 in the 2015 census and median age was 33.9 years. The official languages of the state are Palauan and English. Rekemesik is the title of the traditional high chief from the state.

In June 1972, the resident population was 104.

== Political system ==
Ngatpang has its own constitution, adopted in 1981. The state government was established in 1982. Ngatpang State follows a governance structure with an elected governor and legislative body, elected every four years. The State's population elects one of the members of the House of Delegates of Palau.

== Traditional villages ==
At least seven traditional village sites lie within Ngatpang: one on the west coast, five along the south and east sides of Ngeremeduu Bay, and one on the Ngcholetel River near its juncture with the Ngerbechederngul. These settlements were focused on the rich soil with a mixed forest on a thin strip of land along the coast, around the bay, and extending a short distance up the Ngerbechederngul. The rich deposits of clay around Ngimis are known traditionally as a source of pottery clay, and Ngimis is regarded as an important traditional center of pottery manufacture. In addition, traditional trails marked with small stone platforms led from Ngatpang villages to villages in Aimeliik, Airai, Ngchesar, Melekeok, and Ngeremlengui.

The traditional villages represent important symbols giving identity to families, clans, and regions. Within villages are numerous stone features with historical and traditional importance. Many of the stone platforms, odesongel, serve as clan cemeteries, and other stone features serve as shrines. The lagoon and Ngeremeduu Bay are important resource areas, and were probably intensively exploited prehistorically. Important resources include the mangrove crab, many species of fish, and the mangrove tree. Near Ngimis and the other traditional villages are taro swamp gardens, and surrounding most village sites are garden plots and terraced hillsides.

== Transport ==
Within Ngatpang a network of roads now connects the two modern villages to Koror. The major north-south road begins at the Airai-Aimeliik Road above the Tabecheding and extends north, crossing the Tabecheding and Ngatpang Rivers, past Ngimis to Ibobang. A second road extends north west from Nekken (Aimeliik) to Mechebechubel winding its way through extremely rugged hills. A third road extends east from the Tabecheding to Simizu, Ngchesar, intersecting the north -south road about 2 km south of Ngimis.

== Education ==
The Ministry of Education operates public schools.

Ibobang Elementary School is in Ibobang. When it opened it relieved Ngatpang Elementary School.

Palau High School in Koror is the country's only public high school, so many children from this community go there. Others go to the Belau Modekngei School, a boarding school in Ibobang.
