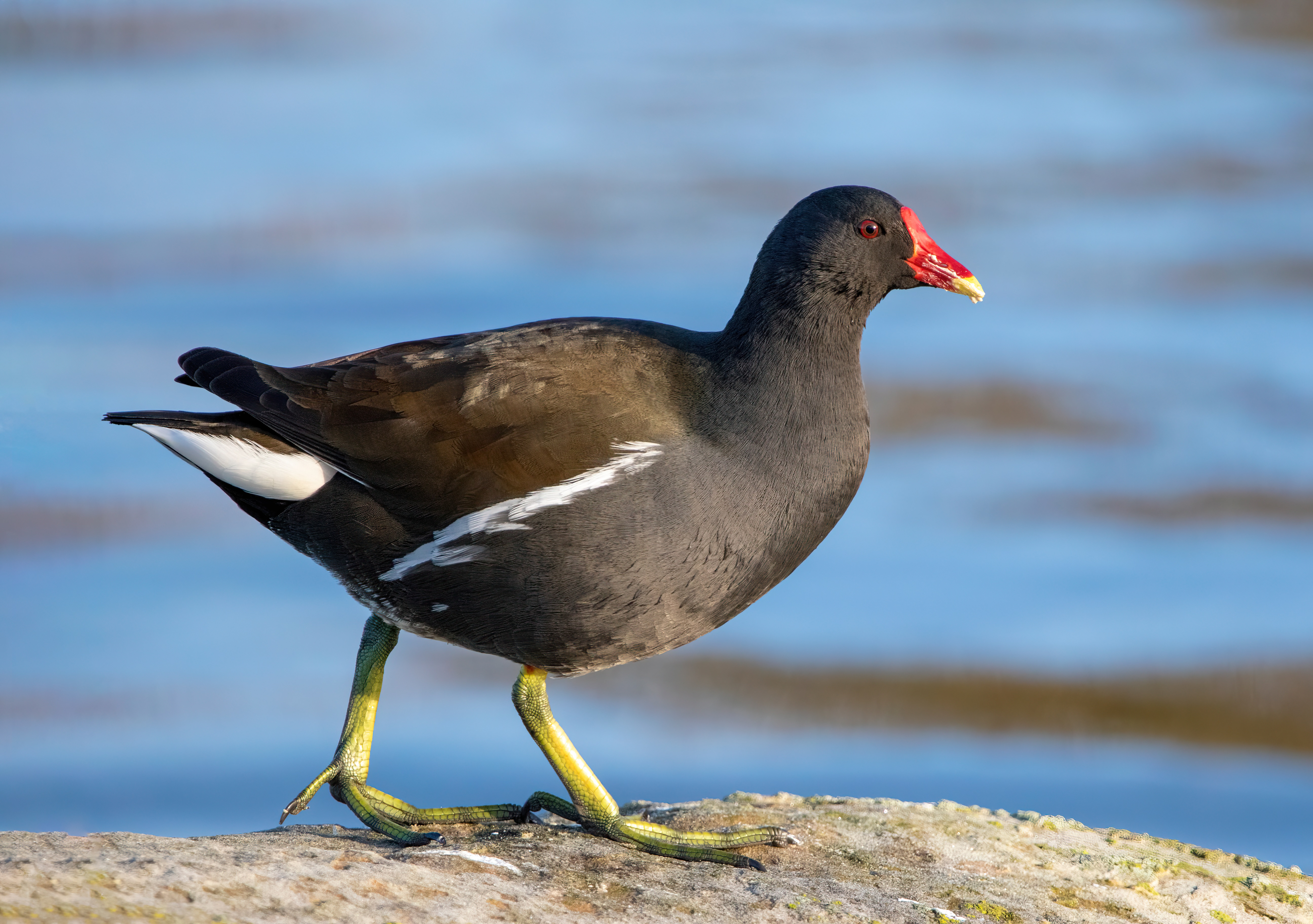
- In France
- In Germany

Conservation status
- Least Concern (IUCN 3.1)

Scientific classification
- Kingdom: Animalia
- Phylum: Chordata
- Class: Aves
- Order: Gruiformes
- Family: Rallidae
- Genus: Gallinula
- Species: G. chloropus

Binomial name
- Gallinula chloropus (Linnaeus, 1758)

Subspecies
- About five; see text
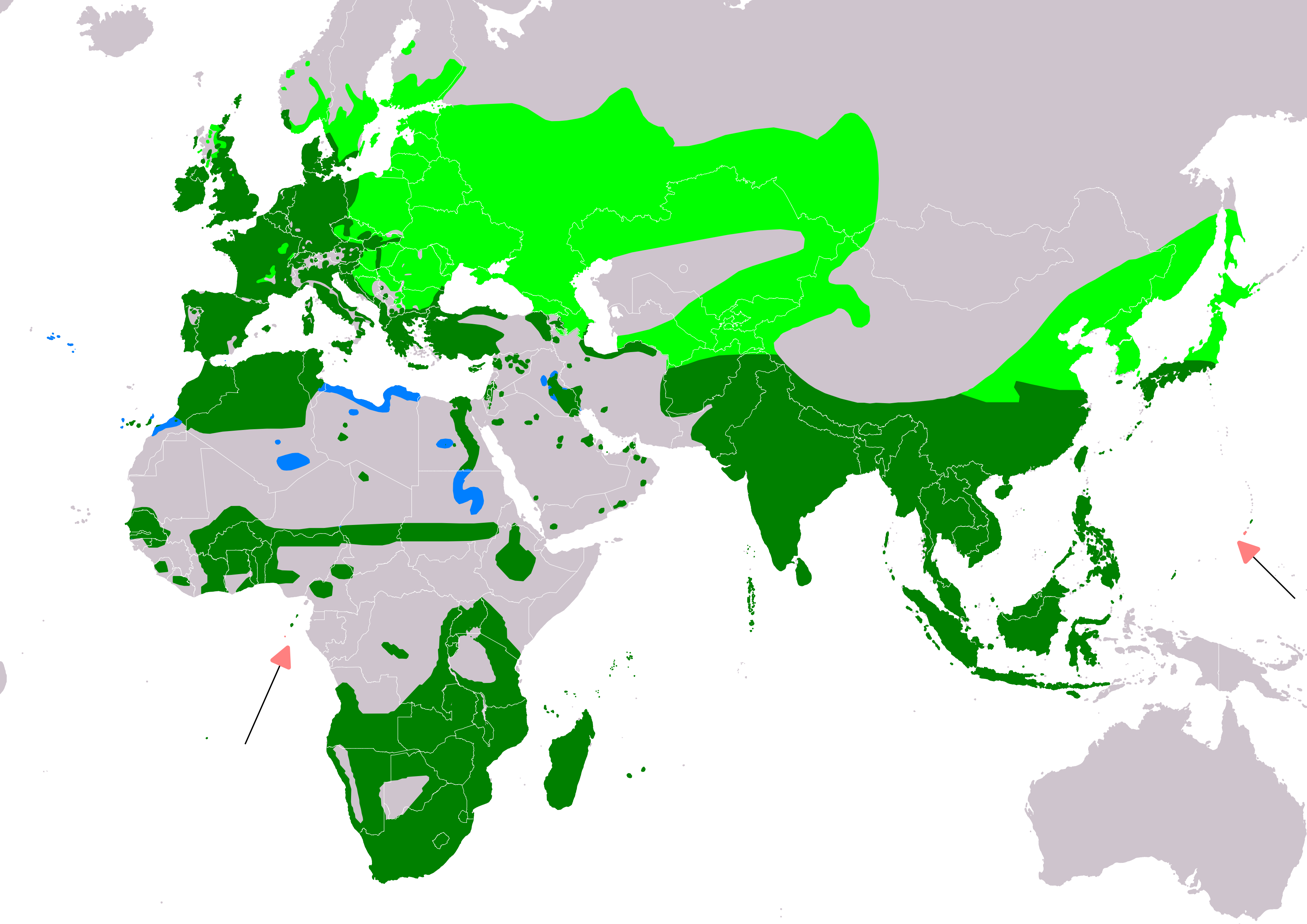
- Range of G. chloropus Breeding Resident Non-breeding Probably extinct

Synonyms
- Fulica chloropus Linnaeus, 1758; Fulica fusca Linnaeus, 1766

Audio
- Audio recording of call in France

= Common moorhen =

Species of bird

The common moorhen (Gallinula chloropus), also known as the waterhen, is a bird species in the rail family (Rallidae). It is distributed across many parts of the Old World, across Africa, Europe, and Asia. It lives around well-vegetated marshes, ponds, canals and other wetlands. The species is not found in the polar regions or many tropical rainforests; generally it is one of the most common Old World rail species, together with the Eurasian coot in some regions.

== Taxonomy ==
The common moorhen was formally described in 1758 by the Swedish naturalist Carl Linnaeus in the tenth edition of his Systema Naturae. He placed it in the genus Fulica and coined the binomial name Fulica chloropus. The common moorhen is now one of five extant species placed in the genus Gallinula that was introduced in 1760 by the French zoologist Mathurin Jacques Brisson. The genus name is from Latin gallinula meaning "little hen" or "little chicken". The specific epithet chloropus combines the Ancient Greek khlōros χλωρός meaning "green" and pous (πούς) meaning "foot".

The closely related common gallinule G. galeata of the New World, and the tristan moorhen G. nesiotis and gough moorhen G. comeri of the Tristan da Cunha archipelago, formerly often regarded as conspecific, are now treated as a separate species by all the ornithological authorities, following the discovery of significant genetic differences in addition to differences in the structure of the red bill shield and vocal differences. The final species in the genus, the dusky moorhen G. tenebrosa of Australasia, has also been considered conspecific by some authors in the past.

The name mor-hen has been recorded in English since the 13th century. The word moor here is in its old sense meaning marsh; the species is not usually found in what is now called moorland. Another old name, waterhen, is more descriptive of the bird's habitat. A "watercock" is not a male "waterhen" but the rail species Gallicrex cinerea, not closely related to the common moorhen. "Water rail" usually refers to Rallus aquaticus, again not closely related.

Five subspecies are currently accepted:

- Gallinula chloropus chloropus (Linnaeus, 1758) – Europe and north Africa to Japan and southeast Asia
- Gallinula chloropus meridionalis (Brehm, CL, 1831) – Africa south of the Sahara and Saint Helena (tropical southeast Atlantic Ocean)
- Gallinula chloropus pyrrhorrhoa Newton, A, 1861 – Comoros, Madagascar, Réunion and Mauritius (west, central Mascarene Islands)
- Gallinula chloropus orientalis Horsfield, 1821 – Inner Islands (northeast Seychelles), Andamans, Malay Peninsula, Greater and Lesser Sunda Islands, Sulawesi region and Philippines
- Gallinula chloropus guami Hartert, EJO, 1917 – north Mariana Islands and Guam (west Micronesia)

== Description ==
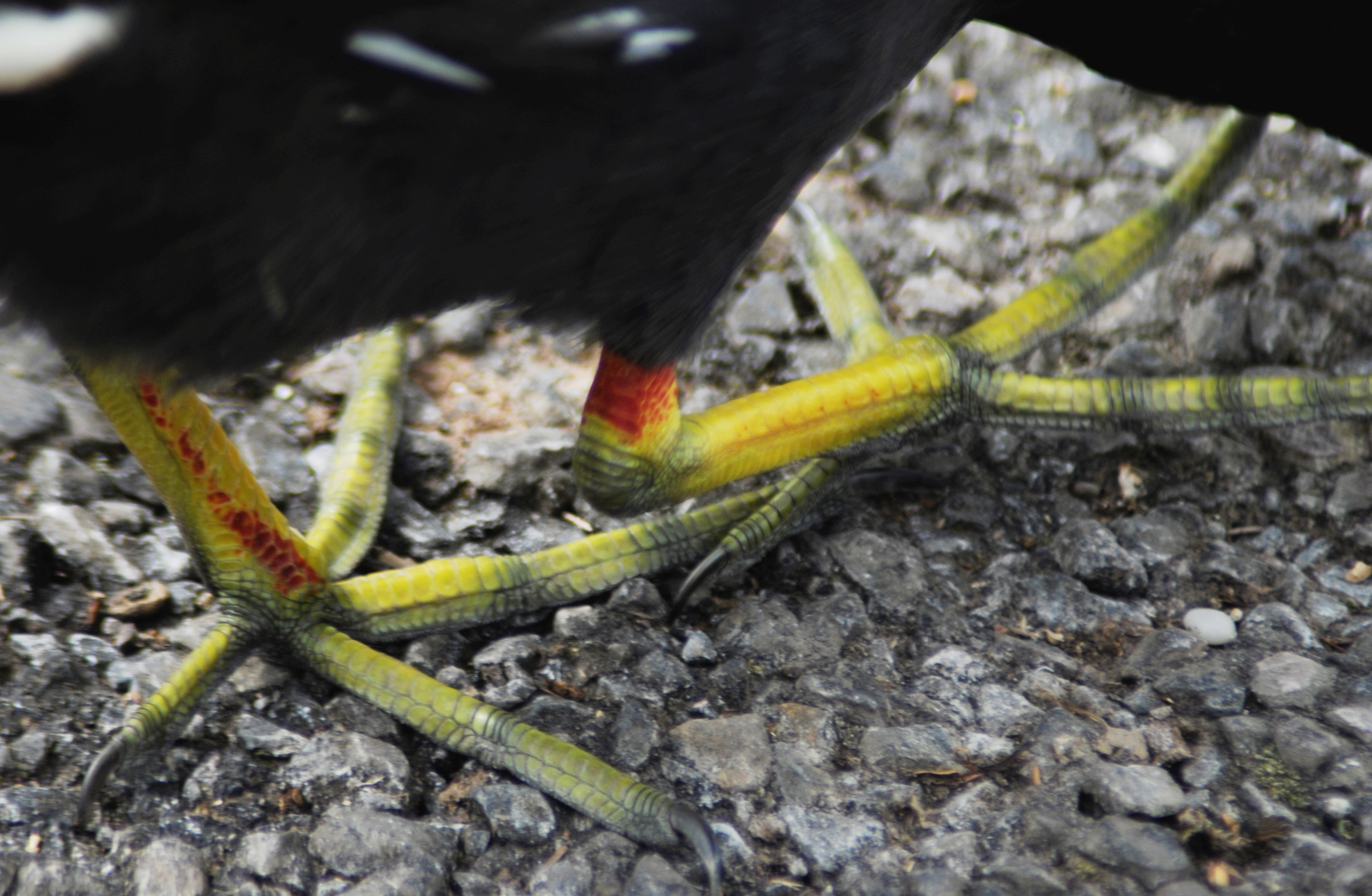
Common moorhen feet have no webbing.

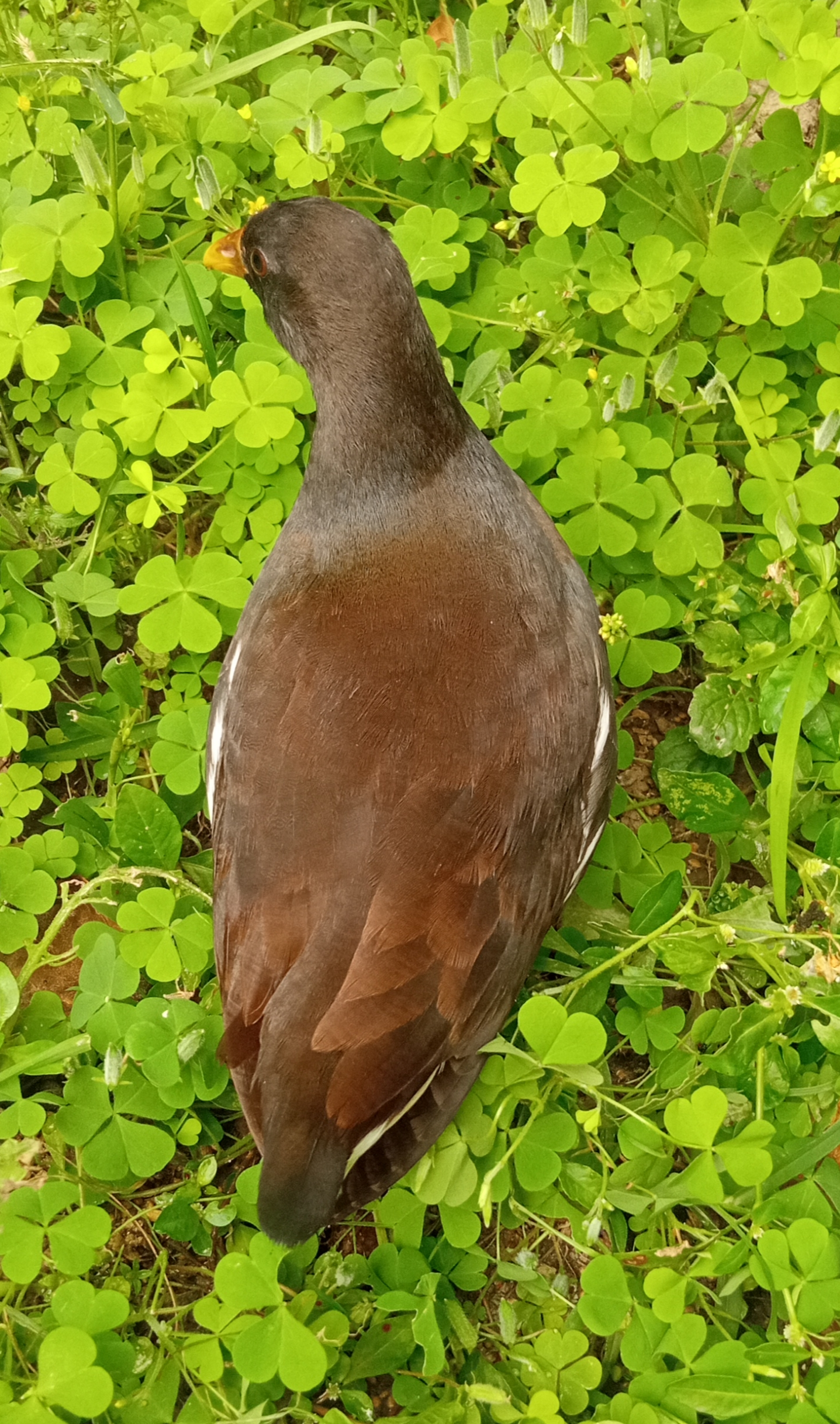
Juvenile common moorhen photographed from above, displaying the juvenile brown plumage.

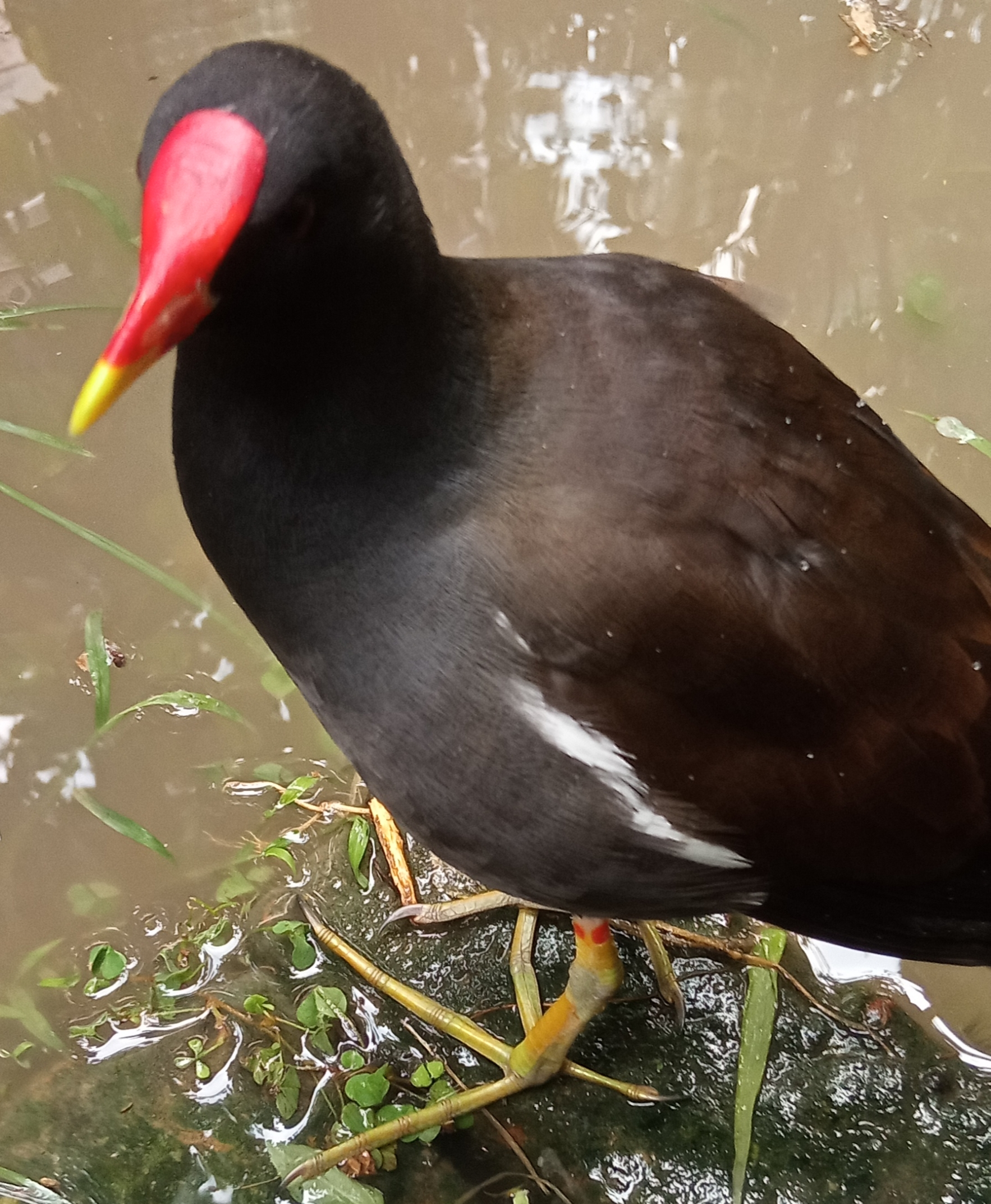
The bill turns bright red with a yellow tip during the breeding season.

The moorhen is a distinctive species, with predominantly black and brown plumage, with the exception of a white under-tail, white streaks on the flanks, yellow legs and a red frontal shield. The bill is red with a yellow tip. The young are browner and lack the red shield. The frontal shield of the adult has a rounded top and fairly parallel sides; the tailward margin of the red unfeathered area is a smooth waving line. The subspecies G. c. meridionalis is smaller than the nominate, has slaty blue-grey upperwing coverts and lacks the olive wash. Subspecies G. c. orientalis is similar to G. c. meridionalis but has a larger shield. Subspecies G. c. pyrrhorrhoa is darker than the nominate; subspecies G. c. pyrrhorrhoa has buff undertail coverts. In the related common gallinule (Gallinula galeata) of the Americas, the frontal shield has a fairly straight top and is less wide towards the bill, giving a marked indentation to the back margin of the red area.

The common moorhen gives a wide range of gargling calls and will emit loud hisses when threatened. A midsized to large rail, it can range from 30 to 38 cm (12 to 15 in) in length and span 50 to 62 cm (20 to 24 in) across the wings. The body mass of this species can range from 192 to 500 g (6 3/4 to 17 3/4 oz).

== Distribution and habitat ==
This is a common breeding and resident bird in marsh environments, rivers, well-vegetated lakes and even in city parks. Populations in areas where the waters freeze, such as eastern Europe, migrate to more temperate climates. In China, common moorhen populations are largely resident south of the Yangtze River, whilst northern populations migrate in the winter; these populations show high genetic diversity.

== Behaviour ==
=== Food and feeding ===
This species will consume a wide variety of vegetable material and small aquatic creatures. They forage beside or in the water, sometimes walking on lilypads or upending in the water to feed. They are often secretive, but can become tame in some areas. Despite loss of habitat in parts of its range, the common moorhen remains plentiful and widespread.

=== Breeding ===
The birds are territorial during breeding season, and will fight with other members of their species, as well as other water birds such as ducks, to drive them out of their territory. The nest is a basket built on the ground in dense vegetation. Laying starts in spring, between mid-March and mid-May in Northern hemisphere temperate regions. About 8 eggs are usually laid per female early in the season; a brood later in the year usually has only 5–8 or fewer eggs. Nests may be re-used by different females. Incubation lasts about three weeks. Both parents incubate and feed the young. These fledge after 40–50 days, become independent usually a few weeks thereafter, and may raise their first brood the next spring. When threatened, the young may cling to the parents' body, after which the adult birds fly away to safety, carrying their offspring with them.

=== Nest parasitism ===
Common moorhens are known to partake in both intraspecific and interspecific parasitism, meaning they will lay their eggs in the nests of other moorhens as well as other species. The frequency of the former increases when there are an insufficient number of nesting sites, while the causes for the latter are relatively unknown. There is no one specific species that is the target of their interspecific parasitism, as moorhen eggs have been discovered in the nests of common coots, grey partridges, mallards, and several other species.

== Status and population ==
Moorhen sighted in Fangu, Corsica (France)

On a global scale (all subspecies taken together) the common moorhen is as abundant, as its vernacular name implies. It is therefore considered a species of Least Concern by the IUCN. However, small populations may be prone to extinction. The population of Palau, belonging to the widespread subspecies G. c. orientalis and locally known as debar (a generic term also used for ducks and meaning roughly "waterfowl"), is very rare, and apparently the birds are hunted by locals. Most of the population on the archipelago occurs on Angaur and Peleliu, while the species is probably already gone from Koror. In the Lake Ngardok wetlands of Babeldaob, a few dozen still occur, but the total number of common moorhens on Palau is about in the same region as the Guam population: fewer than 100 adult birds (usually fewer than 50) have been encountered in any survey.

Other localised groups of common moorhen are starting to come under threat. The Royal Society for the Protection of Birds in the United Kingdom has the common moorhen classified as one of its 103 species whose conservation status is of moderate concern due to its recent population decine. The number of breeding pairs has fallen to its lowest level in the UK since 1966 and has been protected under the Wildlife and Countryside Act (1981).

The common moorhen is one of the birds (the other is the Eurasian coot, Fulica atra) from which the cyclocoelid flatworm parasite Cyclocoelum mutabile was first described. The bird is also parasitised by the moorhen flea Dasypsyllus gallinulae.

== Subspecies ==
Five subspecies are today considered valid; several more have been described that are now considered junior synonyms. Most are not very readily identifiable, as differences are subtle and often clinal. Usually, the location of a sighting is the most reliable indication as to subspecies identification, but the migratory tendencies of the species make identifications based on location not completely reliable. In addition to the extant subspecies listed below, an undescribed form from the Early Pleistocene is recorded from Dursunlu in Turkey.

List of subspecies by date of description
Common and trinomial names	Description	Range
Eurasian common moorhen G. c. chloropus (Linnaeus, 1758); Includes G. c. correiana and G. c. indica.	Wings and back blackish-olive	Ranges from Northwest Europe to North Africa and eastwards to Central Siberia and from the humid regions of the Indian subcontinent and Southeast Asia eastwards to Japan; also found the Canary, Azores, Madeira, and Cape Verde islands.
Indo-Pacific common moorhen G. c. orientalis (Horsfield, 1821)	Small, with slate grey upperwing coverts and large frontal shield.	Found in the Seychelles, Andaman Islands, and South Malaysia through Indonesia; also found in the Philippines and Palau. The breeding population existing on Yap in Micronesia since the 1980s is probably of this subspecies, but might be of the rare G. c. guami. Population size: Perhaps a few 100s on Palau as of the early 2000s, less than 100 on Yap as of the early 2000s.
African common moorhen G. c. meridionalis (C. L. Brehm, 1831)	Similar to G. c. orientalis, but the frontal shield is smaller.	Found in Sub-Saharan Africa and Saint Helena.
Madagascan common moorhen G. c. pyrrhorrhoa (A. Newton, 1861)	Similar to G. c. meridionalis, but the undertail coverts are buff.	Found on the islands of Madagascar, Réunion, Mauritius, and the Comoros.
Mariana common moorhen G. c. guami (Hartert, 1917); Called pulattat in Chamorro.	Body plumage very dark.	Endemic to the Northern Mariana Islands, but see also G. c. orientalis above. Population size: About 300 as of 2001.

== Relationship with humans ==
Moorhens are very tolerant of, and even thrive in human-altered habitats.

=== In history ===
Abdul hamid II, the then-Sultan of the Ottoman Empire, was known to have a special interest in the moorhen, which was found in almost all bodies of freshwater in the land which now constitutes Turkey. So much so that over fifty moorhens were recorded to have been kept and raised in the Yildiz Palace.

== Life cycle ==
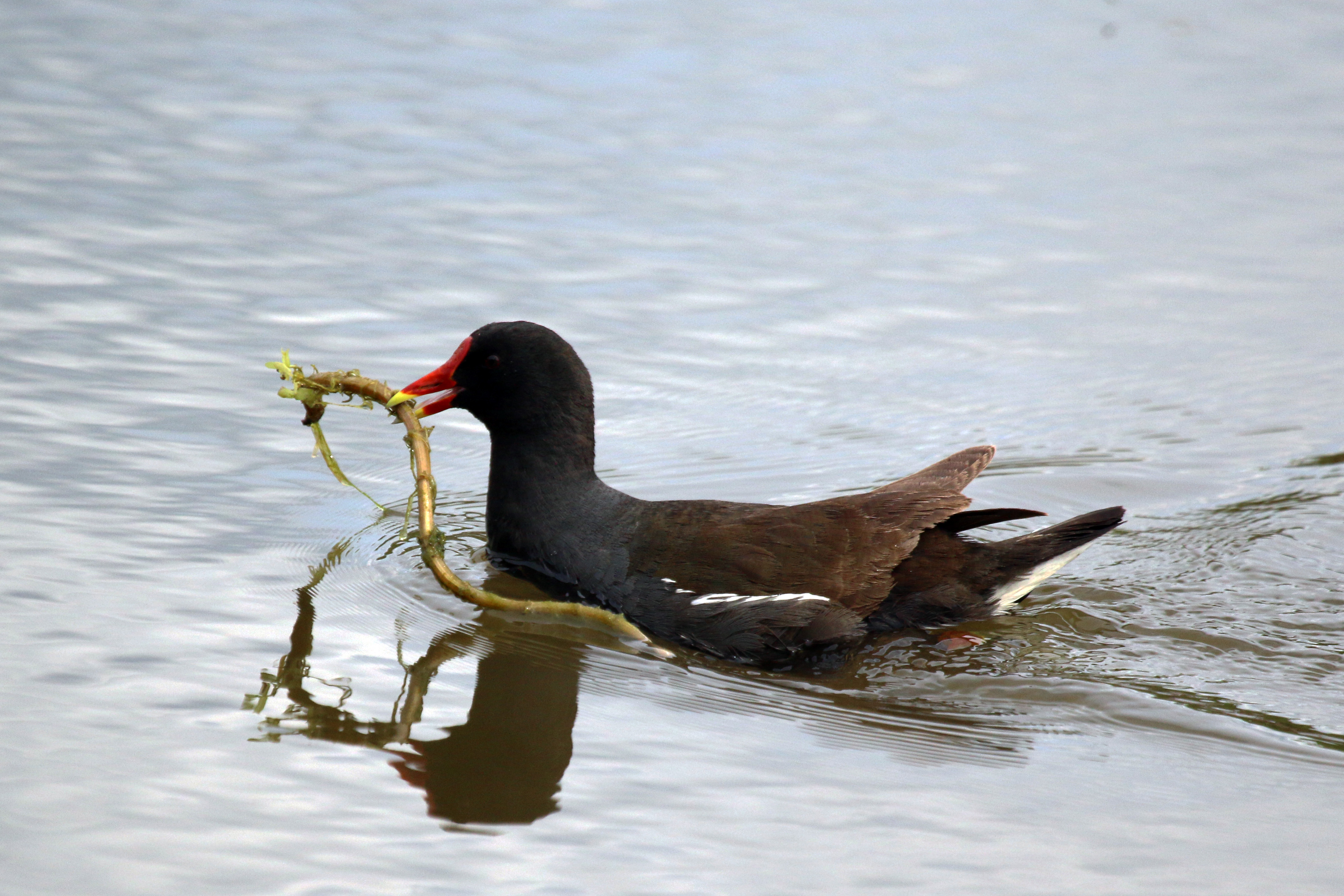
Collecting for nest, Wolvercote, Oxfordshire

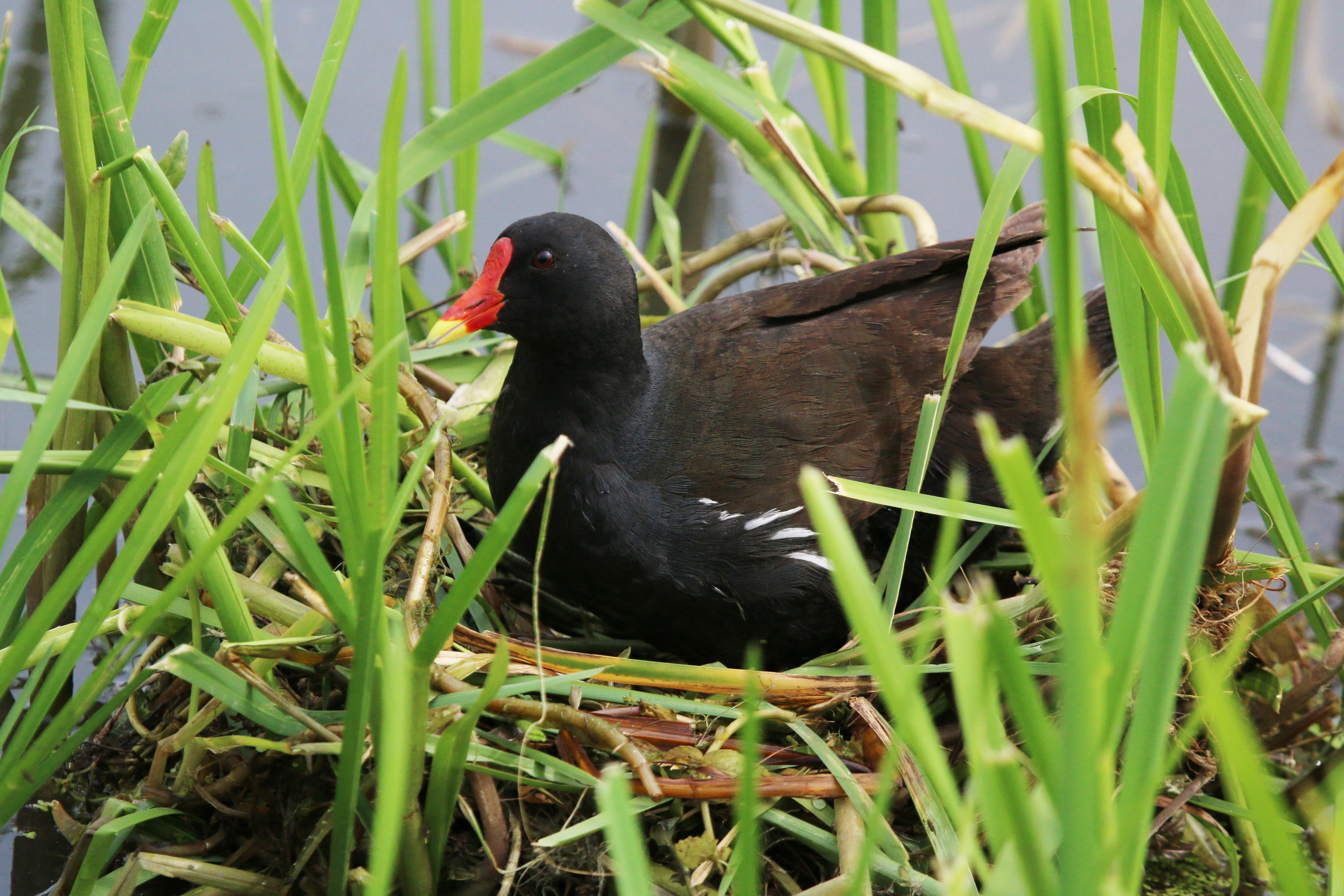
On nest, Wolvercote, Oxfordshire

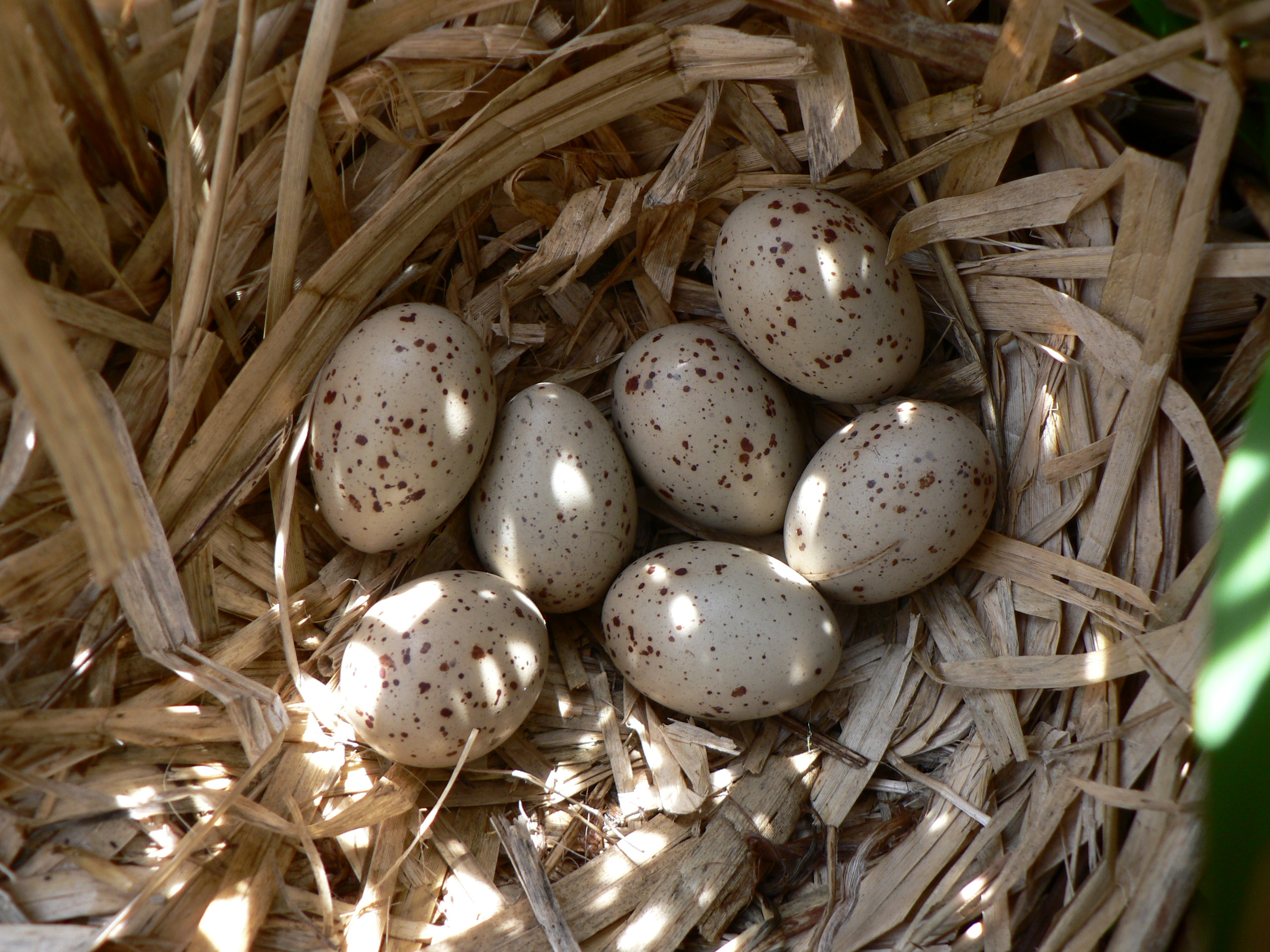
G. c. chloropus nest with small clutch of eggs at Wilgenhoek, Deerlijk (Belgium)

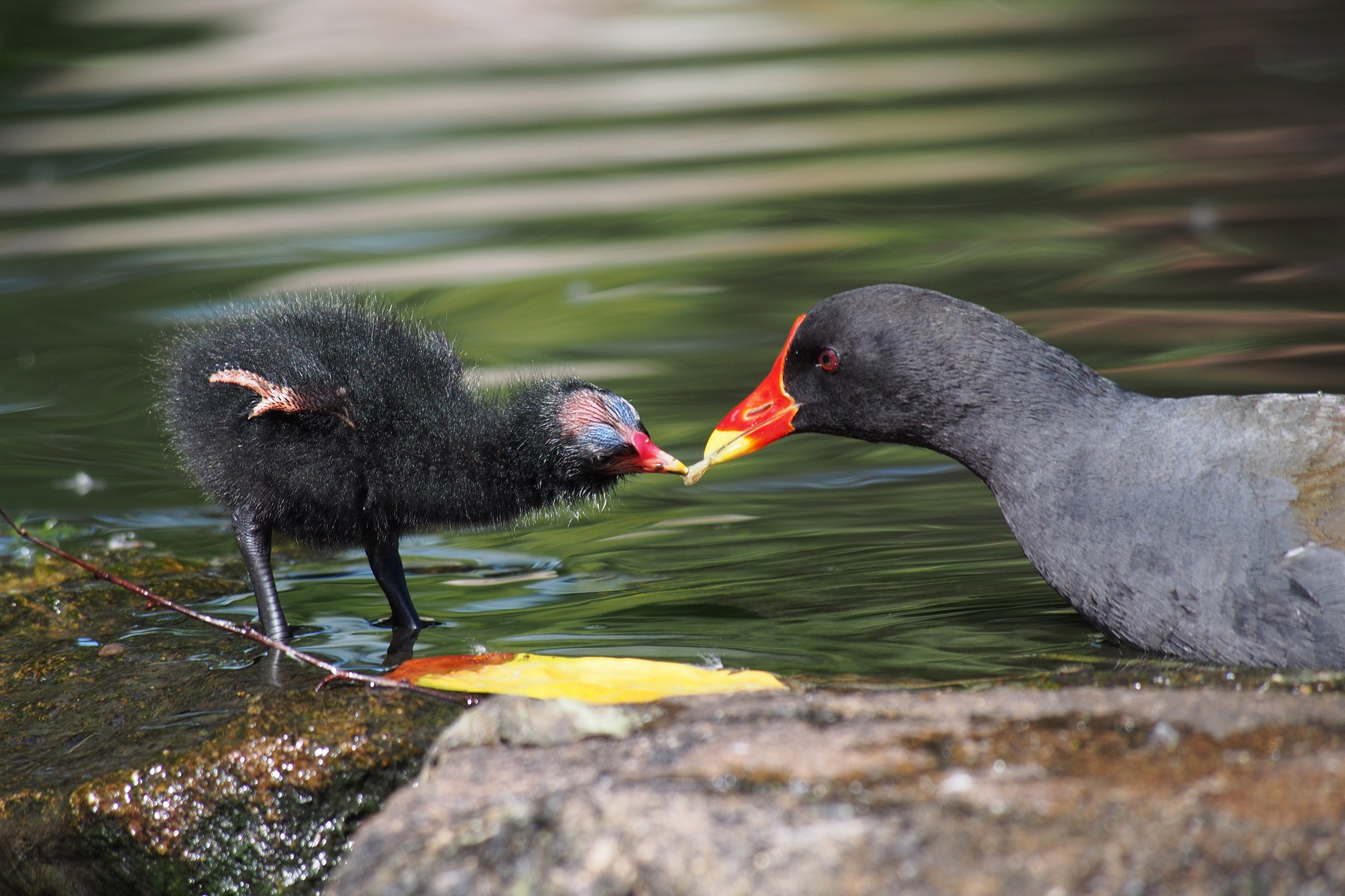
Moorhen feeding a recently hatched chick some food

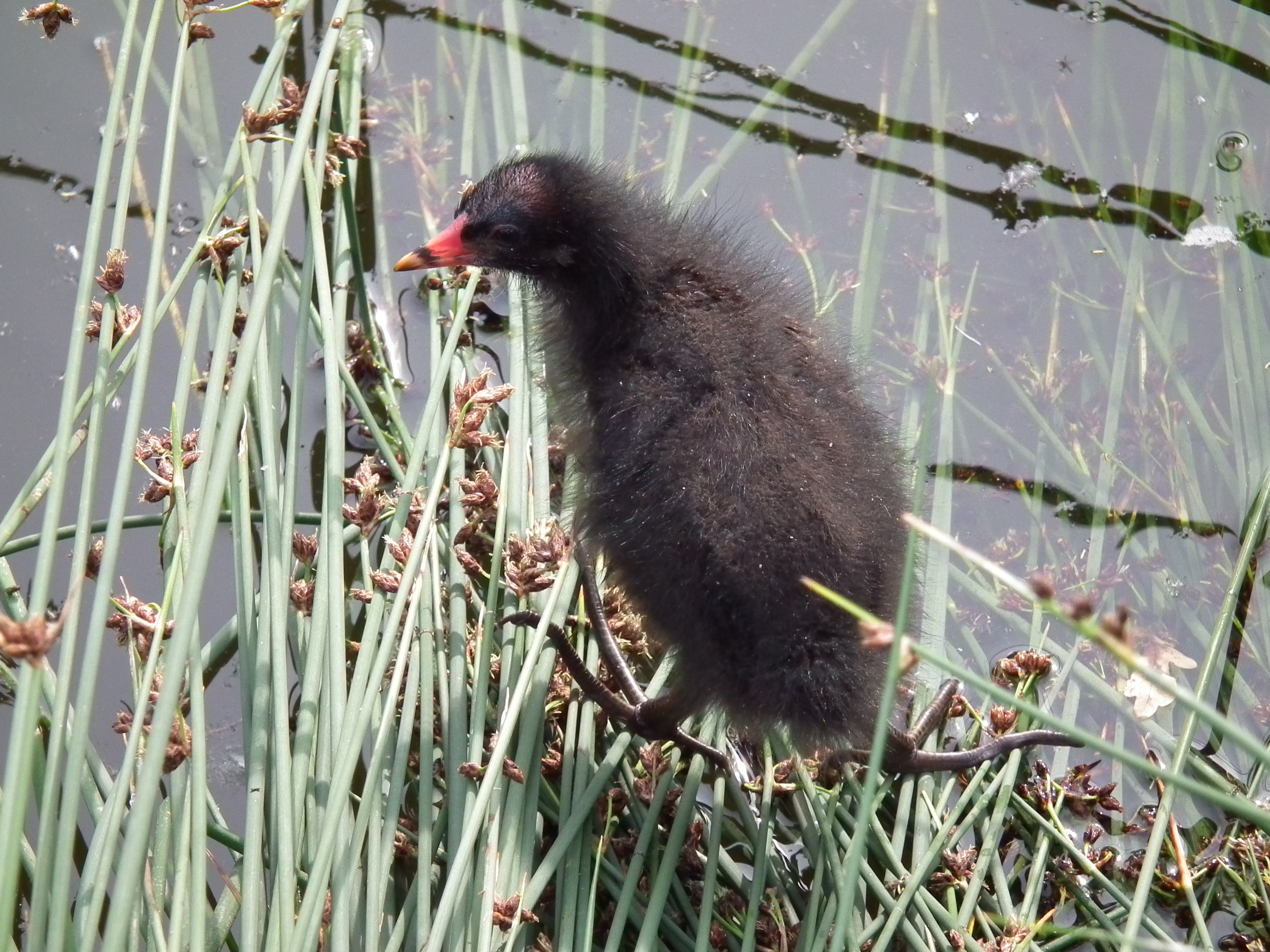
Chick, 1–2 weeks old

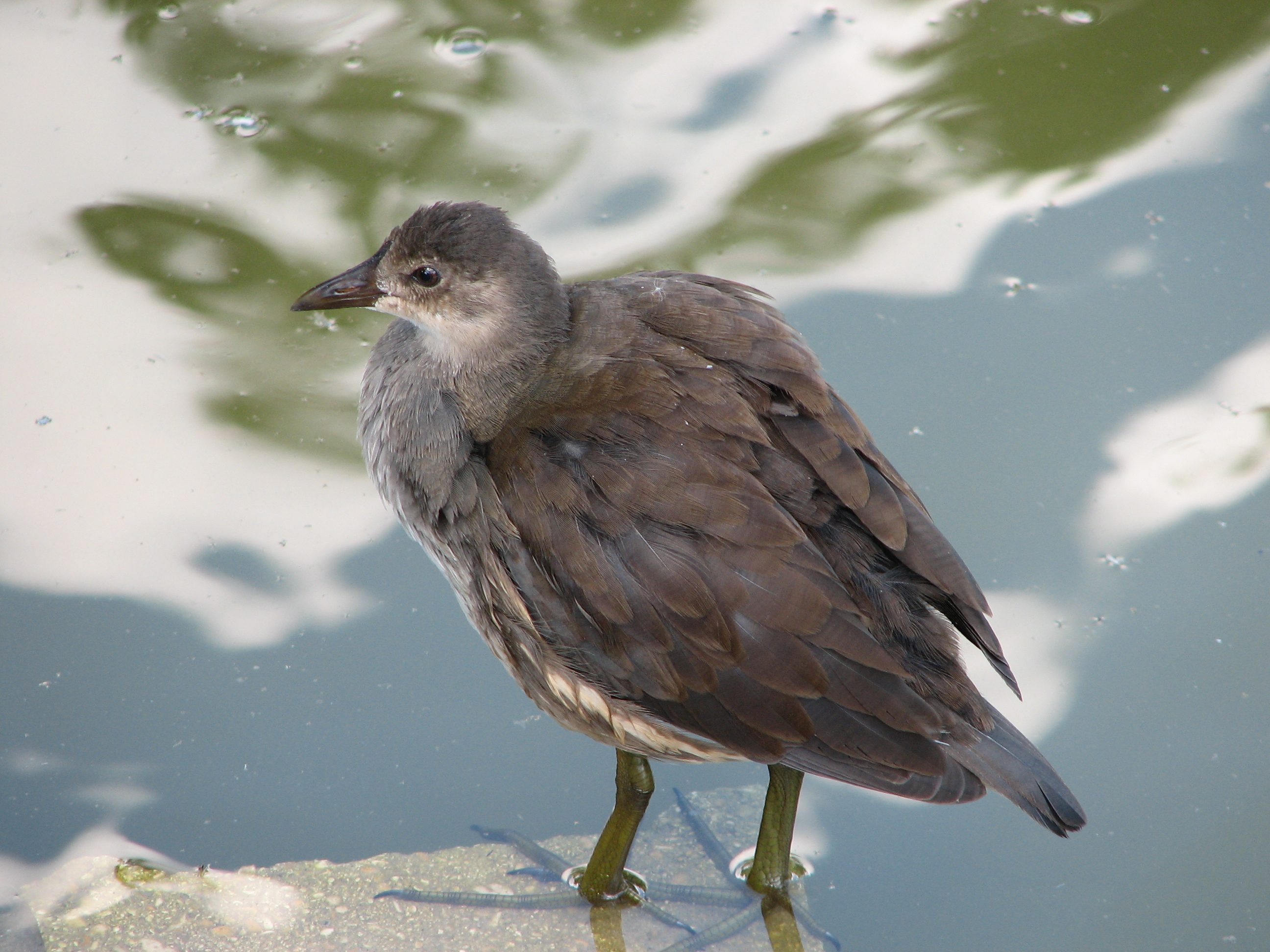
Immature G. c. chloropus, 3–4 months old, in Parc de Bercy, Paris (France)

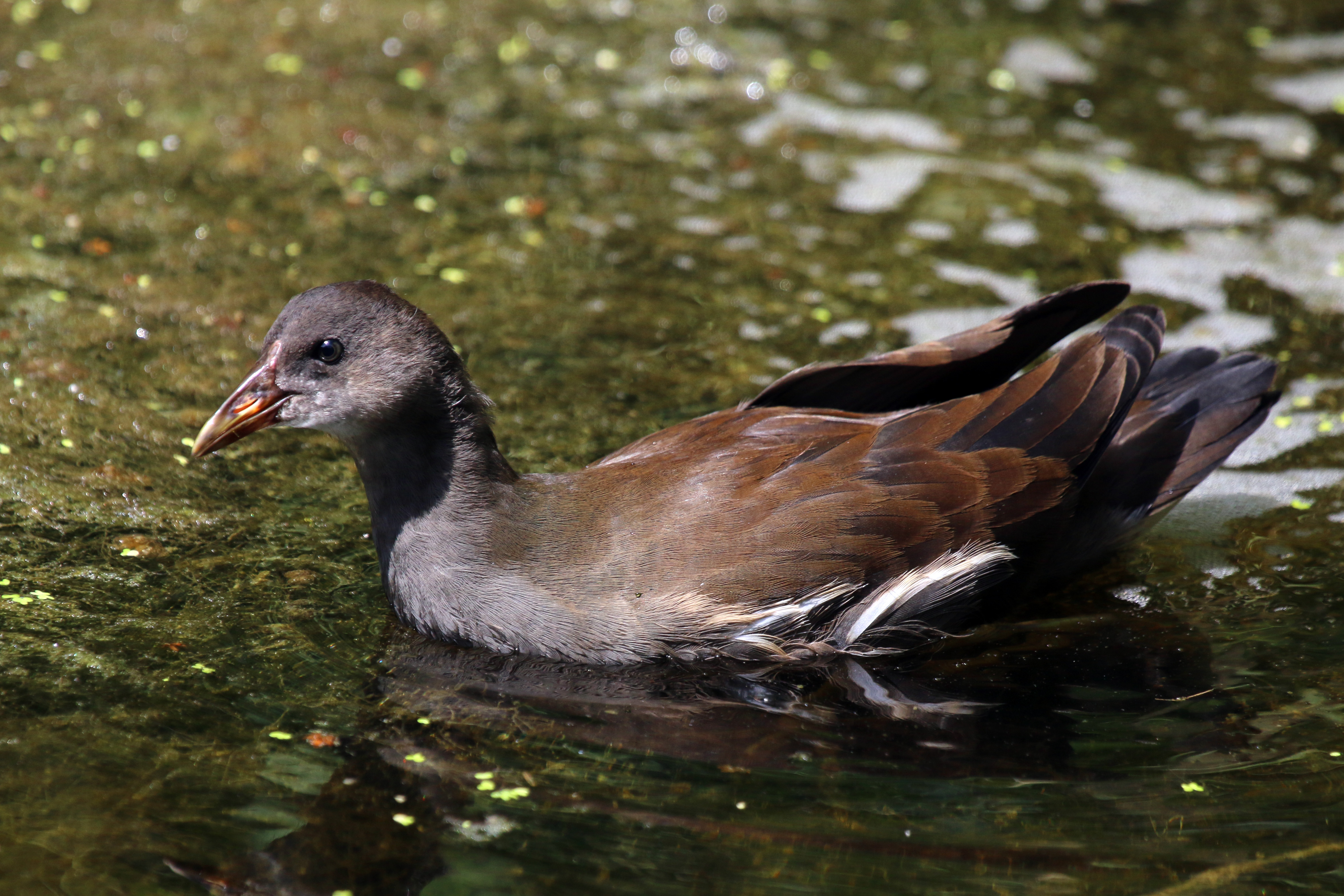
Juvenile, Strumpshaw Fen, Norfolk

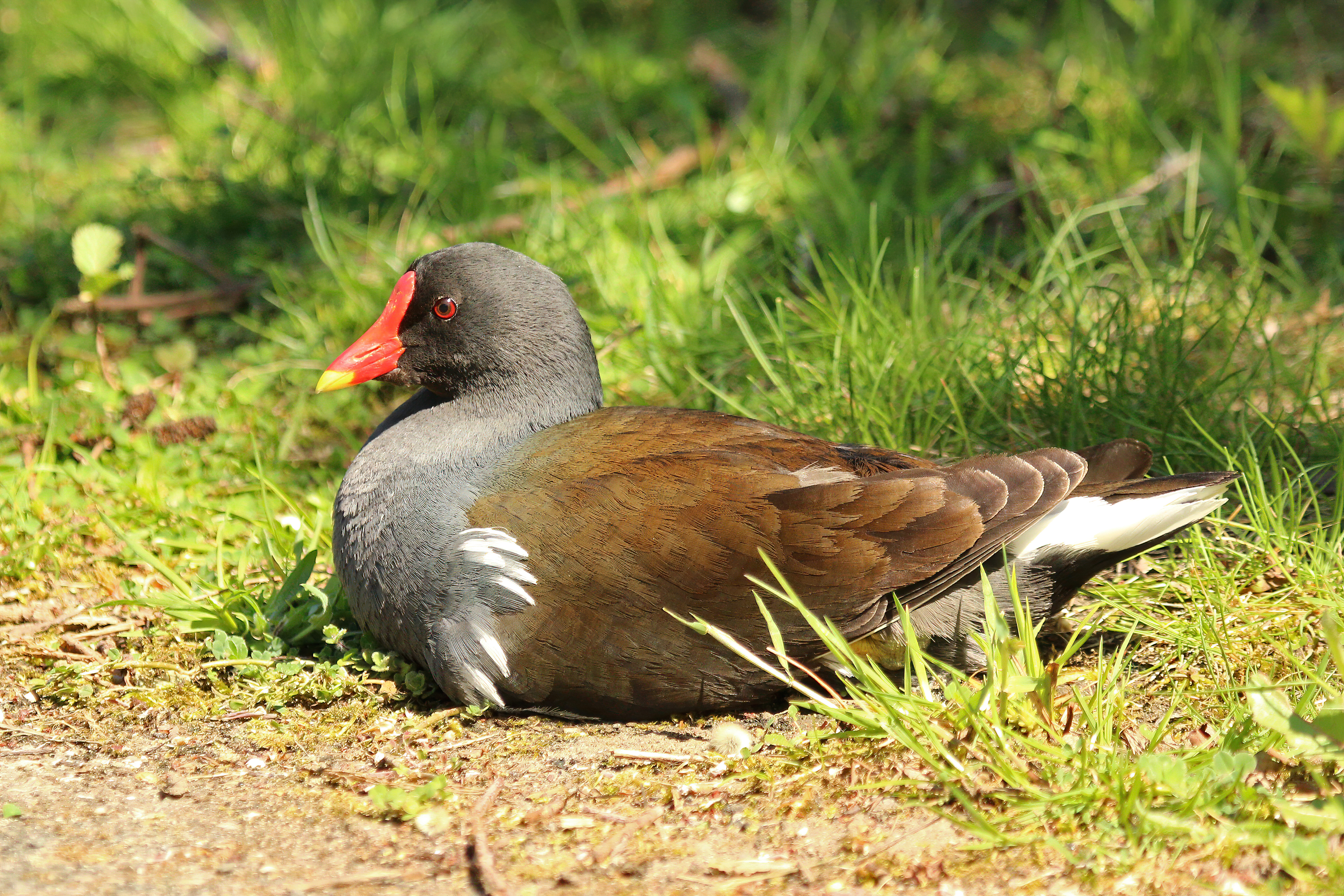
Young adult, London
