= Ngerdorch River =

River in Palau

The Ngerdorch River is a river in Palau that runs from Lake Ngardok to the sea through the states of Melekeok and Ngchesar. The Ngerdorch River serves as a route that connects crocodiles with the sea.
