= Aimeliik Power Plant =

Power plant in Aimeliik, Palau

- Country: Palau
- Location: Aimeliik
- Coordinates: 7°26′36.5″N 134°28′30.1″E
- Status: Operational
- Commission date: 1984

Thermal power station
- Primary fuel: Diesel fuel

Power generation
- Units operational: 4
- Nameplate capacity: 13.08 MW

The Aimeliik Power Plant is a fossil fuel power station in Aimeliik, Palau.

== History ==
The power plant was commissioned in 1984.

== Generation units ==
Currently the power plant consists of 4 installed diesel generators with a total installed capacity of 13.08 MW.
