= Lemon Heights =

Lemon Heights may refer to:

- Lemon Heights, California (also called North Tustin)
- Lemon Heights, Palau, a village in Palau
