= Ngeremasch =

Village in Palau

- Village
- Location in Palau
- Coordinates: 6° 54′ 5″ N, 134° 7′ 46″ E 06°54′05″N 134°07′46″E
- Country: Palau

Population (2009)
  - Total: 135
- Time zone: UTC+9 (Palau Standard Time)
- Area code: (+680) 277

Ngeremasch, also spelled as Ngaramasch (Japanese: ゲレマッシュ, Geremasshu) is a village in Palau, and the capital of the state of Angaur. In 2009, it had a population of 135 people.

Ngaramasch is located west of the Angaur Airstrip, there are also ferries that connect Angaur to Koror. The village was formerly known as Saipan Town (Spanish: Pueblo de Saipán).
