= Mongami =

Village in Palau

Mongami is a village in the southwest of Babeldaob, the main island of the Republic of Palau. It is the capital of the state of Aimeliik and the state’s largest village.

== Subdivisions ==
Traditional settlements within the village include: Ngerkeai and Imul

== Language and Religion ==
Palauan is the spoken language. The population is primarily Roman Catholic, with a minority of Protestants.
