= Ked Ra Ngchemiangel =

- U.S. National Register of Historic Places
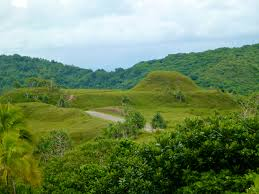
- Nearest city: Aimeliik
- Area: 15 acres (6.1 ha)
- NRHP reference No.: 76002196
- Added to NRHP: September 30, 1976

Ked Ra Ngchemiangel, also known as the Kamyangel Terraces, are a series of sculpted landforms in Aimeliik, a state on the island of Babeldaob, the largest in the island nation of Palau. Located near the Kamyangel River near its entry into Ngchemiangel Bay, the terraced hills are clearly manmade forms created in unknown antiquity, and are arrayed in a curve overlooking the bay. When viewed from head-on, many of these terraces have a stepped "crown and brim" appearance similar to that of a brimmed hat. One of the hills is terraced to a height of 190 feet (58 m).

The terraces were listed on the United States National Register of Historic Places in 1976, while Palau was part of the United States Pacific Trust Territories.
