= Lake Ngardok =

Lake in Palau

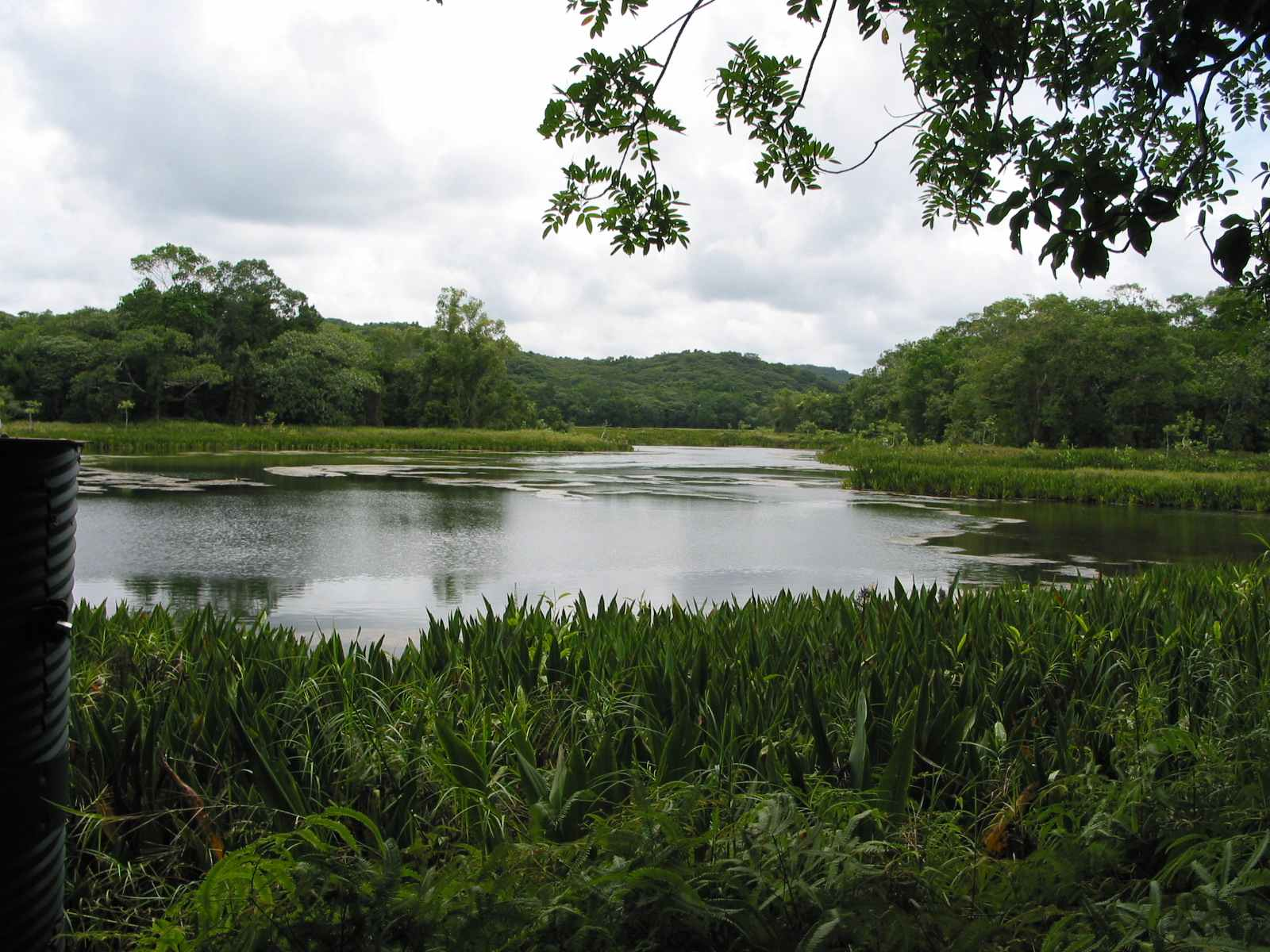

- Location within Palau
- Location: Melekeok
- Coordinates: 7.5125°N 134.603611°E
- Primary outflows: Ngerdorch River
- Basin countries: Palau
- Surface area: 493 ha (1,220 acres)

Ramsar Wetland
- Official name: Lake Ngardok Nature Reserve
- Designated: 18 October 2002
- Reference no.: 1232

Lake Ngardok is a lake on the Palauan island of Babeldaob, in the State of Melekeok. It is the second largest natural freshwater lake in all of the islands of Micronesia, after Lake Susupe on the isle of Saipan in the Commonwealth of the Northern Mariana Islands. The lake and the marshes surrounding it are a refuge for the endangered saltwater crocodile, and it is an important breeding location for them. The Ngerdorch River serves as a route that connects crocodiles with the sea. The lake is approximately 6 hectares in size, with an ecosystem that provides a habitat for plants, wildlife, and birds, some of which are found only in the Palau Islands. These include the endemic Palau fruit dove (biib), Palau fantail (melimdelebdeb), Micronesian imperial-pigeon (belochel), common moorhens and Pacific black ducks (both called debar), Palau flycatcher (charmelachull), and a fruit bat species (olik). The Chief Council of Melekeok State has established the Ngardok Nature Reserve to protect the watershed's slow degradation process, because the importance of the forests are critical to preserving the water quality in the lake. The lake however will soon be established as a reservoir for Ngerulmud, Palau's national capital in Melekeok.
