= Ngchesar =

Coordinates: 7°27′N 134°35′E

- State
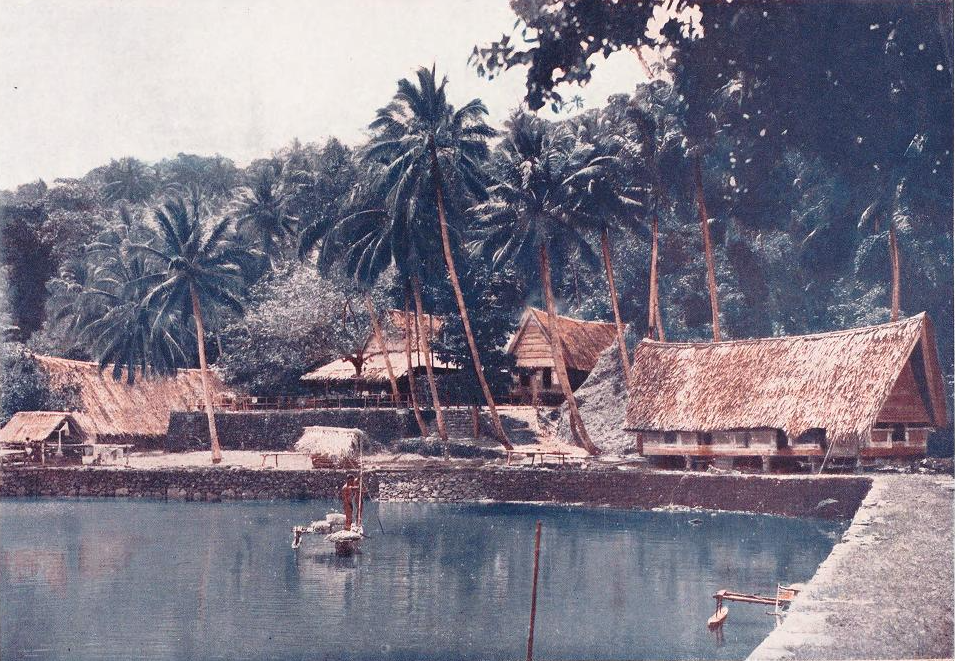
- Ngchesar, Palau in 1932

- Flag

- Location of Ngchesar in Palau
- Country: Palau
- Capital: Ngersuul

Government
  - Body: Ngchesar State Legislature
  - Governor: Duane Hideo

Area
  - Total: 40 km^{2} (15 sq mi)

Population (2015 Census)
  - Total: 291
  - Density: 7.3/km^{2} (19/sq mi)
  - Official languages: Palauan; English
- ISO 3166 code: PW-226

Ngchesar, also known as Oldiais, is one of the sixteen states of the nation of Palau in Oceania.

== History ==
The terraces in the village of Ngerngesang are examples of archaeological sites in the area, through radiocarbon dating, are believed to date back to 491 and 1150 AD.

Ngchesar, like the rest of Palau, was part of the Spanish Empire from the 16th century until 1899 when the territory was sold to the Empire of Germany who ruled the area until the end of World War I, at which time the Empire of Japan took over the area until the end of World War II when the United States took possession of the Territory. Ngchesar became an autonomous state after Palau's independence from the United States.

== Geography ==
Ngchesar is located on the south central east coast between Melekeok and Airai and extends from the coast to the Rael Kedam. The coast is lined with a thick fringe of mangrove swamp forest backed by a ridge parallel to the coast. This coastal ridge is cut by short, steep drainages separated by small ridges which extend like fingers to the coast. Along the coastal plain and ridge, are coconut plantations, thick forests and savannas with thick grass. West of the coastal ridge is the large central valley of the Ngerdorch River. An open forest lines the east side of the valley with rolling hills covered by scrub vegetation on the west. The flanks of the Rael Kedam are covered with a thick upland forest. The southwest part of the state is drained by the Meskelat River, a major tributary of the Ngerdorch. Much of the southern part of the state is covered with open forest.

There are 291 inhabitants, and its capital is Ngersuul. It is the sixth largest state in terms of land, with an area of roughly 40 square kilometers, and it is located on the eastern side of the island of Babeldaob, northwest of Airai State, and southeast of Melekeok State, where the Palauan government is situated. The sacred totem of Ngchesar is the Stingray. Ngchesar is famous for its war canoe "kabekel" named Bisbush which means Lightning.

Presently, most of the use of the land in Ngchesar is confined to gardens surrounding the modern villages of Ngerngesang and Ngchesar and the smaller hamlets at Rrai, Ngerkesou, Simizu, and Ngeruikl. Interspersed with these kitchen gardens are stands of agroforest which include coconut, and betelnut, breadfruit, almond trees, and banana plants. In and around many of the uninhabited villages are stands of coconut and betelnut palms, and occasionally patches of irregularly attended taro swamp gardens. Except for occasional forays to hunt pigeon or harvest special plants, there is little active use of most of the interior of Ngchesar.

== Demography ==
The population of the state was 291 in the 2015 census and median age was 34.5 years. The official languages of the state are Palauan and English. Ngirakebou is the title of the traditional high chief from the state.

In June 1972, the resident population was 604.

== Political system ==
Ngchesar has its own constitution, adopted in 1981. The state government was established in 1982. The state of Ngchesar, with population of less than 300, has an elected chief executive, governor. The state also has a legislature elected every four years. The state population elects one of the members in the House of Delegates of Palau.

== Transport ==
A bladed road now connects Ngchesar to Ngatpang extending from Ngerngesang on the east coast, across the Ngerdorch at Simizu, and crossing the Rael Kedam at Ollumel la Rechieb (Peaches). During the Japanese administration, a network of roads connected Ngchesar to Melekeok, Ngatpang, and Airai, but today these roads are impassable. A road along the coast connects the modern villages from Rrai to Ngeruikl, and a trails extend further north to Ngerubesang in Melekeok.

== Traditional villages ==
More than a dozen traditional village sites lie within Ngchesar, with at least two situated at some distance from the coast on the coastal ridge. The traditional villages represent important symbols giving identity to families, clans, and regions. Within villages are numerous stone features with historical and traditional importance. Many of the stone platforms, odesongel, serve as clan cemeteries, and other stone features serve as shrines. The lagoon is an important resource area and was intensively exploited prehistorically. Important resources include the many species of fish. Near Ngerngesang and the other traditional villages are taro swamp gardens, and most village sites are surrounded by garden plots and terraced hillsides.

== Education ==
The Ministry of Education operates public schools.

Palau High School in Koror is the country's only public high school, so children from this community go there.

== Notable people ==
- Katharine Kesolei, anthropologist
