= Ongeluluul =

- U.S. National Register of Historic Places
- Location within Palau
- Location: Melekeok, Babeldaob, Palau
- Area: 100 acres (40 ha)
- Built: 1750
- NRHP reference No.: 76002199
- Added to NRHP: September 30, 1976

Ongeluluul ("place where one whispers" in Palauan) is a historic stone platform in Melekeok, a community on Babeldaob, the largest island of the island nation of Palau. It is located in Old Melekok Village, about 100 yards (91 m) from the boathouse at the shore. It is separated from the main road by a small creek. The platform measures about 20 by 20 feet (6.1 m × 6.1 m), and was originally fashioned out of finely paved stones, although it was in deteriorated condition when surveyed in 1976. The site is of local historical significance as a place where important secret meetings of local leaders took place, and is a type of site other major Palauan communities have. This platform was erected in 1750, and was the site of two significant peace treaties in Palauan history: one in 1793 and the other in 1870. The latter peace treaty marked the end of organized warfare between the clans of Palau.

The site where the platform is located was listed on the United States National Register of Historic Places in 1976, a time when Palau was part of the US-administered Trust Territory of the Pacific Islands.
