= Meteu 'L Klechem =

- U.S. National Register of Historic Places
- Location within Palau
- Location: Melekeok, Babeldaob, Palau
- Coordinates: 7°29′33″N 134°38′10″E
- Area: 100 acres (40 ha)
- Built: 1948
- NRHP reference No.: 76002197
- Added to NRHP: September 30, 1976

Meteu 'L Klechem is a historic stone monolith in Melekeok, a community on the island of Babeldaob, the largest island in the nation of Palau. It is a roughly octagonal stone, 7 feet (2.1 m) long and 2 feet (0.61 m) thick, and weighing about 3,000 pounds (1,400 kg). When recorded in 1976, it was used as a bridge across a local stream. The monolith is historically significant for its association with Metau, a warrior of the late 18th century. In 1785 Metau was ambushed and killed on Koror Island in revenge for attacks he had made on Yapese boats headed there. His body was held as a ransom, and was laid on this stone. Metau's brother Reklai paid the ransom (the then-large equivalent of $60,000), and in 1795 the stone and body were transported to Melekeok for burial. The stone sat at the main pier at Beriber until 1948, when it was moved to its present location.

The site where the monolith is located was listed on the United States National Register of Historic Places in 1976, a time when Palau was part of the US-administered Trust Territories of the Pacific.
