= Angaur =

Angaur アンガウル州 (Japanese) Angauru-shū
- State
- Flag

- Location of Angaur in Palau
- Country: Palau
- Capital: Ngeremasch

Government
  - Body: Angaur State Legislature
  - Governor: Natus Misech

Area
  - Total: 8 km^{2} (3.1 sq mi)

Population (2015 Census)
  - Total: 119
  - Density: 15/km^{2} (39/sq mi)
  - Official languages: Palauan; English; Japanese
- Time zone: UTC+9 (Palau Standard Time)
- Area code: (+680) 277
- ISO 3166 code: PW-010

Angaur (Japanese: アンガウル, Hepburn: Angauru), or Ngeaur in Palauan, is an island and state in the island nation of Palau.

== History ==
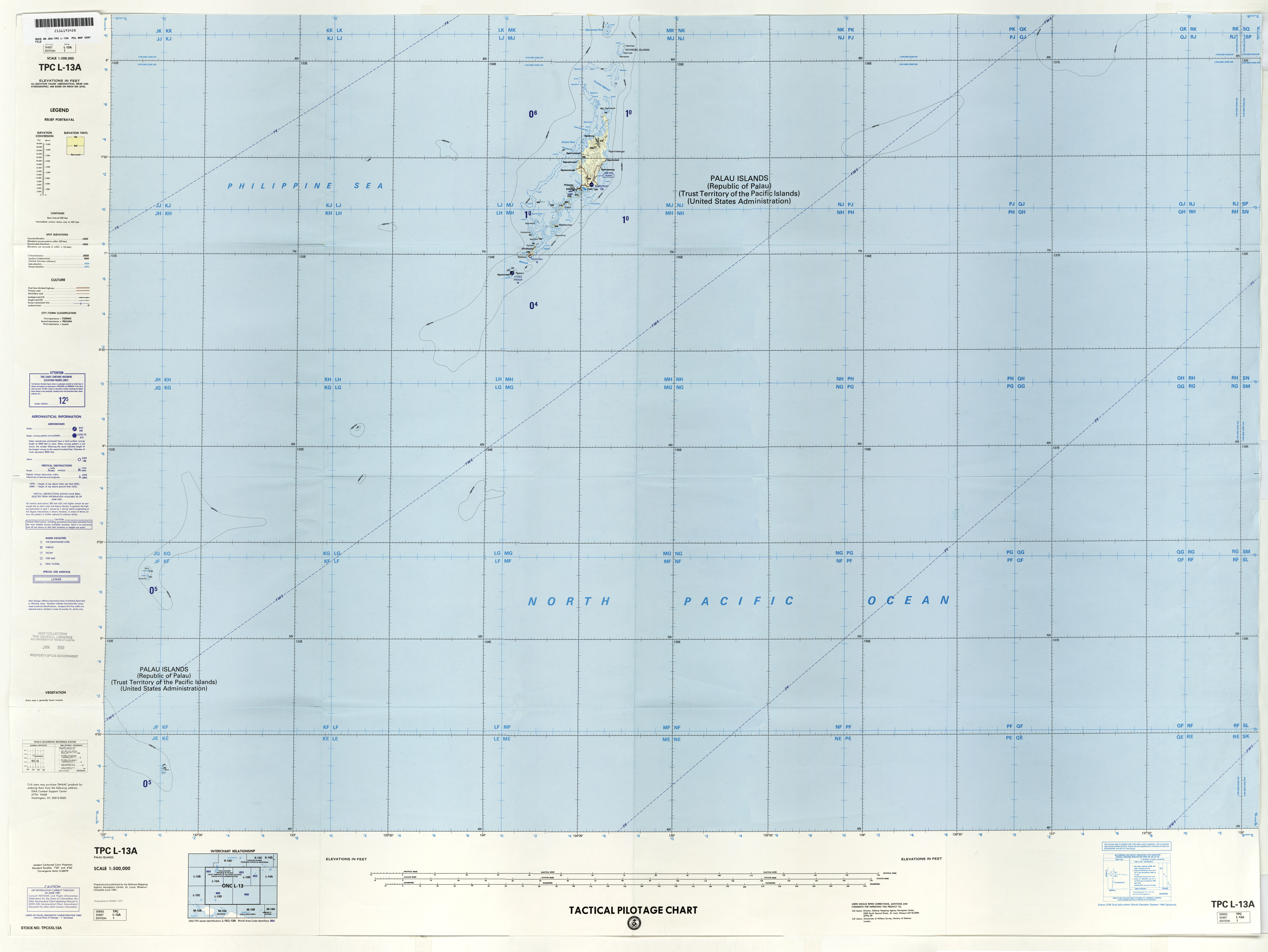
Map including Ngeaur (DMA, 1991)

Map of Angaur State with the Lukes (traditional place).

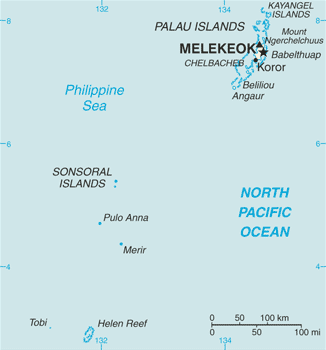
Location of Angaur (upper right)

Angaur was traditionally divided among some eight clans. Traditional features within clan areas represent important symbols giving identity to families, clans and regions. These features include a variety of stone platforms with historical and traditional importance. Traditional cemeteries are frequently located in or around some of these stone platforms. The large quantities of shell recovered from archaeological sites gives evidence for an intensive exploitation of the limited lagoon surrounding the island and for collecting and fishing outside of the reef as well. On the island, the localized areas of soil were intensively used for garden plots.

The first sighting of Angaur, Babeldaob, Koror, and Peleliu recorded by Westerners was by the Spanish expedition of Ruy López de Villalobos at the end of January 1543. They were then charted as Los Arrecifes (The Reefs in Spanish). In November and December 1710, these three islands were again visited and explored by the Spanish missionary expedition commanded by Sargento Mayor Francisco Padilla on board of the patache Santísima Trinidad. Two years later they were explored in detail by the expedition of Spanish naval officer Bernardo de Egoy.

From 1909 until 1954 phosphate mining took place on Angaur, originally by the Germans, then the Japanese, and finally by Americans. Angaur is the site of a major World War II battle. The Battle of Angaur was part of the larger offensive campaign called Operation Forager that ran from June to Nov 1944. Many American and Japanese battle relics remain scattered throughout the island. The 7th Antiaircraft Artillery Battalion under Lieutenant colonel Henry R. Paige served as garrison forces for the remainder of the War. Angaur is the only place in Micronesia that has feral monkeys; they are descended from macaques that escaped during the period of German occupation. Thus it is also called Monkey Island.

Angaur is accessible by boats and small planes, and Belau Air has service to Angaur Airstrip. From 1945 to 1978 the U.S. Coast Guard operated a LORAN transmitting station, LORSTA Palau, as part of the worldwide LORAN navigation system.

== Geography ==
Angaur is a coralline island located some 10 km southwest of Beliliou at the southern tip of the main group of islands in the archipelago, and is situated outside of the lagoon and enclosing reef for this main group. Angaur is surrounded by a thin reef which encloses a narrow lagoon, though for the most part the reef is so small and low that it offers little impediment to the waves which break directly on the steep cliffs which ring the island. Distinct from the rock islands which lie between Beliliou and Koror, Angaur is a raised platform island. The profile of the island is a low table with very little relief. The highest point on the island, a small hill northwest of Rois, is only 40 m above sea level, and most of the island is less than 10 m above sea level. On the ground, however, the terrain is very rugged with steep, jagged outcrops of ancient reef rising unpredictably in a tangled maze. To the northwest the ground is slightly higher, and to the southeast the ground is slightly lower with marshy swamps across the karstic landscape.

Modern settlement on Angaur is concentrated on the west coast south of the harbor to a point of land called Bkul a Usas. Separated by lines of social division are the modern villages of Rois and Ngaramasch.

Most of Angaur is covered with a mixed limestone forest which includes several small stands of casuarina forest (ironwood orngas trees). Surrounding the modern villages and many houses are garden plots and interspersed with these are small pockets of agroforest (a variety of trees providing useful domestic products and foodstuffs). A large area of taro swamp gardens known as Ngetkebui lies in the southern part of the island.

The island, which forms its own state, has an area of 8 km^{2} (3 mi^{2}). Its population was 130 in 2012. The state capital is the village of Ngeremasch on the western side. A second village, Rois, is immediately east of Ngeremasch. Angaur Island is located southwest of Peleliu, and it is a popular surfing location.

=== Phosphate ===
Long before people came to this part of the Pacific Ocean, Angaur was a nesting ground for large numbers of birds whose droppings would eventually become phosphate deposits. In the early part of the 20th century, phosphate mines were started in the rugged terrain in the northwest part of the island and along the east coast. These mines, started during the German administration, were in operation periodically for three administrations ending in the 1950s in the American Period. The mined phosphate was initially processed and loaded on ships at a small harbor on the west side of the island. Apparently this small natural harbor has been expanded during the course of phosphate mining. Also constructed with the harbor expansion was a lighthouse whose abandoned remains are situated on the high ground to the northwest.

== Demography ==
The population of the state was 119 in the 2015 census and median age was 43.3 years.

In June 1972, the resident population was 517. History of the population:

Ucherbelau is the title of the traditional high chief from the state.

== Languages ==
According to the state constitution of 1982, Angaur's official languages are Palauan (and the Angauran dialect in particular), English and Japanese. It is the only place in the world where Japanese is a de jure official language, as it is only the de facto official language of Japan. At the time the constitution was written, many of the elders participating in the process had been educated in Japanese, as was the practice once Japan gained control of the South Seas Mandate in 1914.

However, the results of the 2005 census show that in April 2005 there were no usual or legal residents of Angaur aged 5 or older who spoke Japanese at home at all. No residents of Angaur reported themselves or were reported as being of Japanese ethnic origin. One person born (but apparently not residing) on Angaur reported to speak Japanese and Palauan equally often at home. The 2012 mini census showed 7 people aged 10 or older literate in any language other than Palauan and English for Angaur, out of a total population of 130.

== Political system ==
Angaur has its own constitution, adopted in 1982. The state government was established in 1982. The state of Angaur, with population of less than 150, has an elected chief executive, governor. The state also has a legislature elected every two years. The state population elects one of the members of the House of Delegates of Palau.

== Transport ==
The island is connected by a network of roads. Secondary roads radiate out across the island and almost encircle it. On the east side of the island is a landing strip constructed during the Japanese administration. Although unimproved, the 6600 foot runway known as the Angaur Airstrip is used for the single-engine plane serving Angaur with daily flights from the Airai airport. The presence of the runway played an important role in the decision by the Americans to take Angaur along with Beliliou during World War II. Unlike the battle of Peleliu, however, Angaur received much less shelling before the invasion and the battle did not entail the tragic loss of life witnessed on Beliliou.

== Education ==
The Ministry of Education operates public schools.

Angaur Elementary School was established in 1945. A new building in another location opened in 1953. It moved to the original site in 1966 in a new building but it later moved back to the second site.

Palau High School in Koror is the country's only public high school, so children from this community go there.

== Tourism ==
It is a very popular place for surfing. In 2003, the Palau National Congress legalized casino gambling on the island.

Among other attractions are the cemetery of planes and ships that were destroyed in World War II, a Buddhist memorial honoring the Japanese fallen in combat and a small Japanese Shinto shrine.

== See also ==
- Battle of Angaur
- Angaur Airstrip
- Peleliu Naval Base
