= Ibobang =

- Village
- Map showing location of Ibobang
- Coordinates: 7°29′21″N 134°31′43.21″E
- Country: Palau
- State: Ngatpang

Ibobang is a village in Ngatpang, Palau. It consists of a roughly linear settlement, farmland, and a marina.
