= Odalmelech =

- U.S. National Register of Historic Places
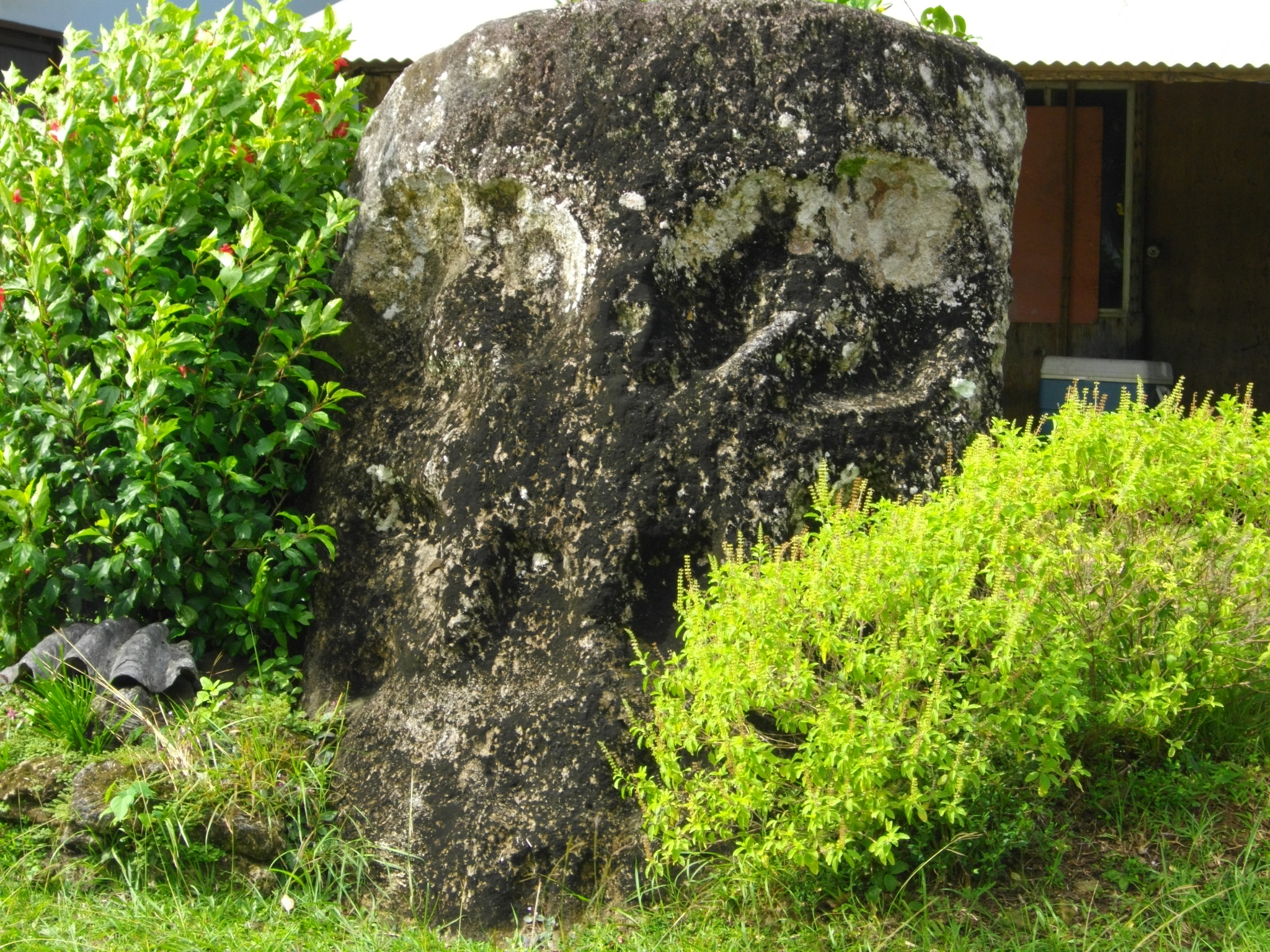

- Location within Palau
- Location: Melekeok, Babelthuap, Palau
- NRHP reference No.: 76002198
- Added to NRHP: September 30, 1976

Odalmelech is a prehistoric large carved stone face of a god-king, and surrounding garden with additional carved stones, in Melekeok, on Babelthuap island of the nation of Palau. It was listed on the United States National Register of Historic Places in 1976; the listing includes the Odalmelech stone itself and several others.
