= Rael Kedam =

Island in Palau

- Interactive map of Rael Kedam
- Coordinates: 11°23′34.1″N 134°55′44.4″E

Area
  - Total: 704 km^{2} (272 sq mi)

Dimensions
  - Length: 54 km (34 mi)
  - Width: 13 km (8.1 mi)
  - Depth: 2,490–4,070 m (8,170–13,350 ft)

Rael Kedam is the great central dividing ridge on the island of Babeldaob, in Palau.

It has a maximum depth of 4,070 metres (13,350 ft).
