= Aimeliik =

Coordinates: 7°25′N 134°31′E

- State
- Flag

- Location of Aimeliik in Palau
- Country: Palau
- Capital: Mongami

Government
  - Body: Aimeliik State Legislature
  - Governor: Browny Simer

Area
  - Total: 52 km^{2} (20 sq mi)

Population (2015 Census)
  - Total: 334
  - Density: 6.4/km^{2} (17/sq mi)
  - Official languages: Palauan; English
- ISO 3166 code: PW-002

Aimeliik is an administrative division of the island country of Palau. It is one of the Republic of Palau's 16 states. It has an area of 52 km^{2} and a population of 334 (census 2015). The state capital is the village of Mongami. The four other villages are Medorm, Imul, Elechui and Ngmechiangel.

The island is the location of Palau's largest powerplant. The state is also a short distance from the international airport. In the village of Medorm there is the highest powered short wave radio station in Palau. This is owned and operated by High Adventure Ministries originally from the US but now owned by a consortium of Chinese national churches. It comprises four short wave transmitters two are Thomson which originally came from Adventist Radio in Guam the others are a venerable Harris transmitter and a 30-year-old RCA transmitter all feeding several stacked curtain arrays which are beamed on South East Asia. They operate mainly on the 9 and 15 MHz Bands.

== History ==
At least seven traditional village sites existed in Aimeliik, Medorm, Ngchemiangel, Ngebedech, Chelechui, Ngerkeai, Imul, and Ngerderar. These settlements were focused on the rich soil with a mixed forest on a thin strip of land along the coast and around the bay.

Within villages are numerous stone features with historical and traditional importance. Many stone platforms, odesongel, serve as clan cemeteries, while other stone features serve as shrines.

The lagoon and Ngchemiangel Bay are important resource areas, and were probably intensively exploited prehistorically. Important resources include mangrove trees and many species of fish. In and around traditional villages are taro swamp gardens and garden plots, and surrounding many village sites are terraced hillsides.

The territory was governed by Spain until 1899 when it was sold to Germany. In 1919 it became a Japanese possession until the United States took control after World War II. Aimeliik is one of the most ancient villages in Palau. It is best known for its terraces and modern bai. Aimeliik is also known for Malsol's Tomb, the legendary spot where the warrior Malsol is buried, which is now accessible through the main road and near the Aimeliik bai. Aimeliik is commonly passed through on the main road of the Babeldaob Island.

== Geography ==
Aimeliik, located on the southwest corner of Babeldaob, includes low, rolling hills surrounding Ngchemiangel Bay and the very steep and rugged terrain along the west coast north of Medorm. The modern villages of Aimeliik include inhabited settlements at Medorm, Ngchemiangel, Chelechui, Imul Ngerkeai - Medorm -, and Nekken (the modern agricultural experimentation center ). Except for the Isemiich River drainage, most drainages in Aimeliik are short, narrow, and steep. North of the low divide separating Ngchemiangel Bay from Ngeremeduu Bay, the Tabecheding River constitutes the boundary with Ngatpang. On the east, Aimeliik extends to the Rael Kedam, the central ridge dividing eastern from western drainages on Babeldaob Island. On the southeast, the boundary with Airai lies along a ridge descending west from the Rael Kedam to a point about one kilometer south of the Ngerderar River.

Land use in Aimeliik includes both private gardens in areas surrounding houses and large areas of commercial agricultural development. A variety of crops are raised in commercial enterprises, and, in addition is some cattle herding. Around modern villages, interspersed with kitchen gardens, are stands of agroforest including coconut, betelnut, breadfruit, almond trees, and banana plants. In lowlands along drainages are patches of irregularly attended taro swamp gardens. In at least one area, southeast of Medorm, a steep drainage was modified to retain water for gardening.

Aimeliik is also known for its terraces, which were most likely built for agriculture and defense reasons. The state also contains one of the four Palauan bais, or men's meetinghouses, the other three are in Koror, Airai, and Melekeok.

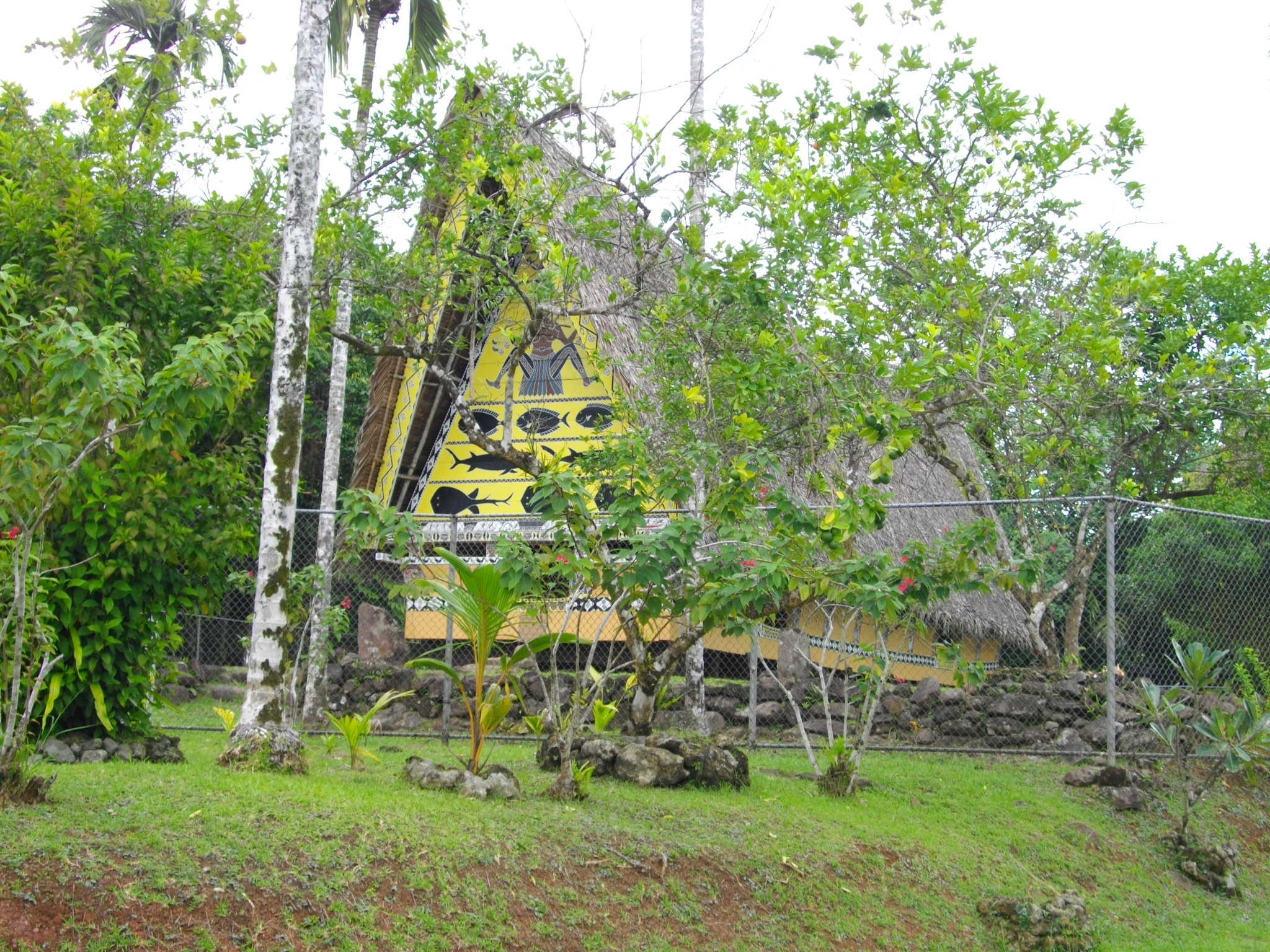
Aimeliik bai

== Demography ==
The population of the state was 334 in the 2015 census and median age was 34.9 years. The official languages of the state are Palauan and English. Rengulbai is the title of the traditional high chief from the state.

In June 1972, the resident population was 441.

== Political system ==
Aimeliik has its own constitution, adopted in 1982. The state government was established in 1983. The state of Aimeliik, with population of less than 350, has an elected chief executive, governor. The state also has a legislature elected every four years. The state population elects one of the members of the House of Delegates of Palau.

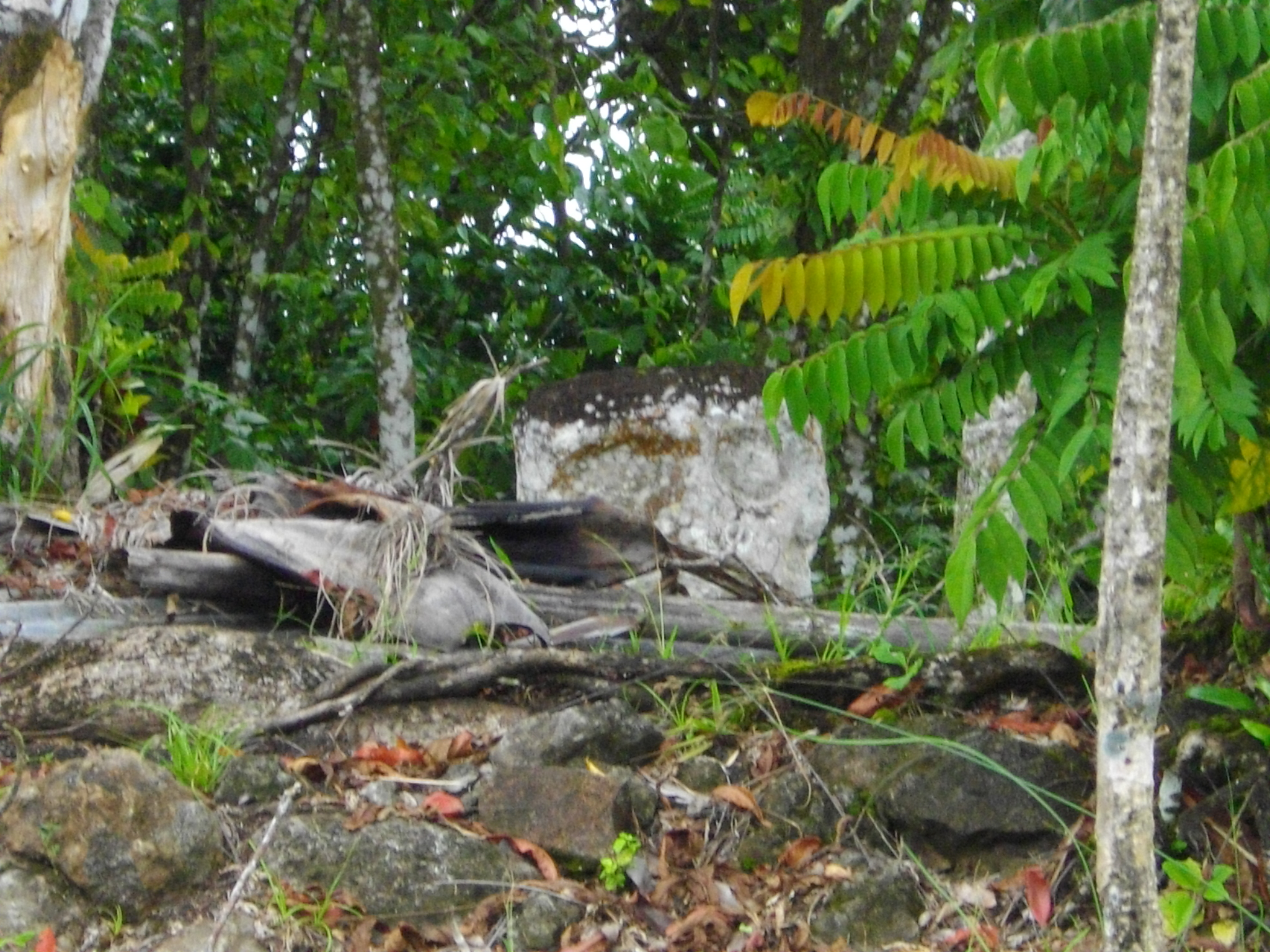
Malsol's Tomb

== Economy ==
Large area of the commerce and farming come from Nekken. Most farm are substantial farming but there was also the attempt to establish Aimeliik State's first cattle pasture, but Palau's soils, forage and climate are ill-suited to open grazing cattle operations.

== Transport ==
Most of the roads in the state are connected with dirt roads, excluding the recently completed paved, compact road which runs through the state.

Within Aimeliik, a road network now connects all of the inhabited villages to Koror. The major Airai-Aimeliik road follows an old Japanese era road along the coast from Ngetkib Airai through the Ocholochol and Ngerderar regions to south of Imul where it turns inland and climbs to the ridge separating the Ngeremeduu Bay basin from the south coast. Just after the road reaches the ridge line is the intersection with the north–south road through Ngatpang along the east side of the bay. The Airai -Aimeliik road follows the ridge line to Nekken, where the road branches, with the southern branch following along the west side of the Isemiich River to Ngchemiangel, and the northern branch winding through some very rough terrain to Mechebechubel Ngatpang. At Ngchemiangel, another branch of the road extends northwest to Medorm.

== Education ==
The Ministry of Education operates public schools.

Aimeliik Elementary School was established in 1948.

Palau High School in Koror is the country's only public high school, so children from this community go there.
