= Melekeok =

Coordinates: 7°29′N 134°36′E

- State
- Flag

- Location of Melekeok in Palau
- Country: Palau
- Capital: Melekeok

Government
  - Body: Melekeok State Legislature
  - Governor: Henaro Polloi

Area
  - Total: 25 km^{2} (9.7 sq mi)

Population (2020 Census)
  - Total: 318
  - Density: 13/km^{2} (33/sq mi)
  - Official languages: Palauan; English
- ISO 3166 code: PW-212

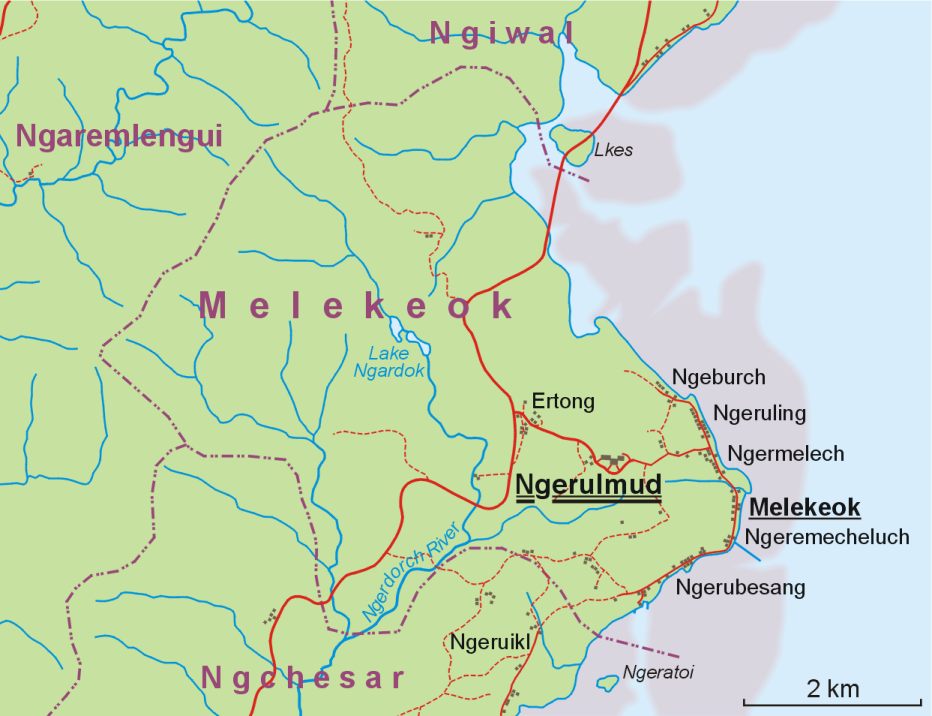
Map of State of Melekeok

Melekeok is a state of the Republic of Palau located on the central east coast of Babeldaob Island. The seat of government of the country, Ngerulmud, is located in the state. The state consists of long beaches, hills, steep ridges, rivers, and the largest and only natural freshwater lake in Palau and Micronesia, Lake Ngardok.

== Political system ==
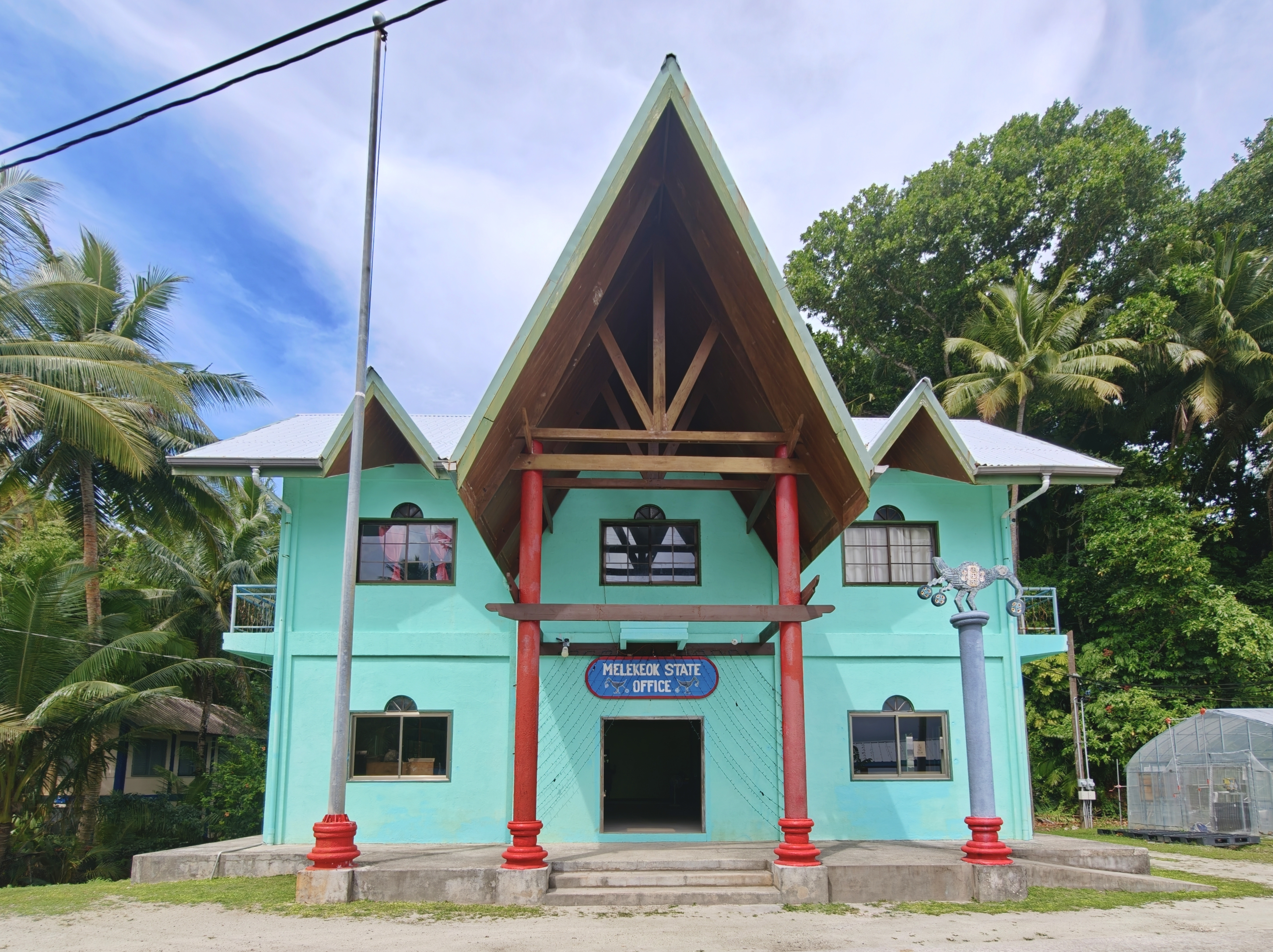
Melekeok State Office

Melekeok has its own constitution, adopted in 1983. The state government was established in 1984. The state of Melekeok, with population of 318, has an elected chief executive, governor. The state also has a legislature elected every four years; its population elects one of the members in the House of Delegates of Palau.

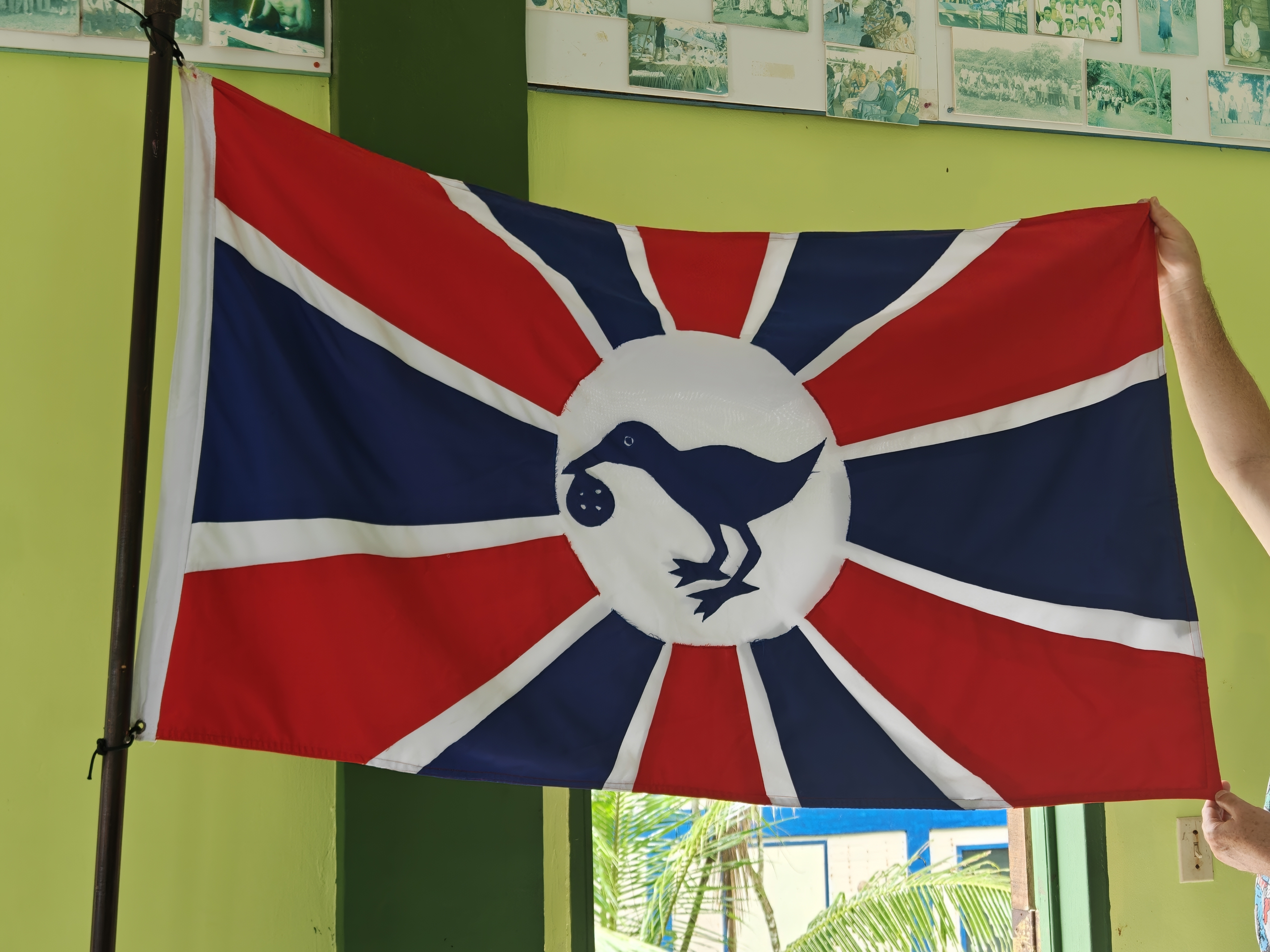
Flag of Melekeok, Melekeok State office

== Geography ==
Melekeok, located on the central east coast of Babeldaob, includes long stretches of sandy beaches and the broad Ngerdorch River valley which begins at Lake Ngerdok, the largest fresh water lake in Palau. Melekeok extends from the lagoon on the east coast to the Rael Kedam, the central divide on Babeldaob Island, and situated between Ngiwal on the north and by Ngchesar on the south. To the west, Melekeok is bounded by Ngeremlengui. The interior of the state is composed of steeply dissected rolling hills with swampy marshes lining sluggish drainages. Thick forests cover the east flanks of the Rael Kedam, and the sandy beaches are lined with coconut palms, but much of the interior is covered with sparse vegetation. A thin fringe of mangroves emerges along the northern and southern stretches of coast, but is lacking for most of the central coast. A ridge system parallels the coast and the prominent Tochobei Hill is situated near the center of this system. A series of small ridges descend like fingers from the main ridge system to the coast. Melekeok State is approximately 11 square miles (28 km^{2}) in total area.

The capitol building of Palau, Ngerulmud

Melekeok's Lake Ngardok is the largest natural body of fresh water in all of Micronesia at 4.93 square kilometres (1.90 sq mi); it has a small population of saltwater crocodiles Crocodylus porosus.

Presently, most land use in Melekeok is confined to gardens surrounding the modern villages of Ngerubesang, Ngerang Ngerames, Ngermelech, and Ngeruliang. Melekeok Village and sometimes Ngeburch are also recognized as hamlets of Melekeok, and in fact, administrative control for much of Melekeok is held by Melekeok Village. Interspersed with these kitchen gardens are stands of agroforest which include coconut, betelnut, breadfruit, almond trees, and banana plants. In and around many of the uninhabited villages are stands of coconut and betelnut palms, and occasionally patches of irregularly attended taro swamp gardens.

== Demography ==
The population of the state was 277 in the 2015 census and median age was 37.3 years. The official languages of the state are Palauan and English. Reklai is the title of the traditional high chief from the state.

In June 1972, the resident population was 378. According to the 2005 census, 391 people resided in the State of Melekeok. They are distributed among seven villages, with Melekeok being the largest. The new capital, Ngerulmud, had not been established at the time of the census, and lies on a hill, northwest of the village of Melekeok.

1. Melekeok (271)
2. Ertong (20)
3. Ngeburch (34)
4. Ngeremecheluch (38)
5. Ngermelech (5)
6. Ngerubesang (12)
7. Ngeruling (21)

== Education ==
The Ministry of Education operates public schools.

The Melkeok Elementary School consists of a two-story building.

The Palau High School in Koror is the country's only public high school, so children from this community go there.

== Transport ==
Within Melekeok, a paved road connects the four modern villages. A bladed road runs to the packed earth airstrip, and connects Melekeok with southern Babeldaob.

== Tourism ==
Apart from its natural beauties and the Capitol, there are several registered places of interest:

- Odalmelech (Ngermelech Gods carved from Stone), Ngermelech Village
- Meteu el Klechem, Melekeok Village
- Did el Bad er a Beriber (Ancient Dock's stone bridge), Melekeok Village
- Ngermecheluch Site, Ngerang
- Bai el Melekeong/Euang el Chades (Melekeok's Bai and its platform of four), Melekeok Village
- Lomech er Ngii el mora Ngeremecheluch (ancient stone path), Melekeok Village

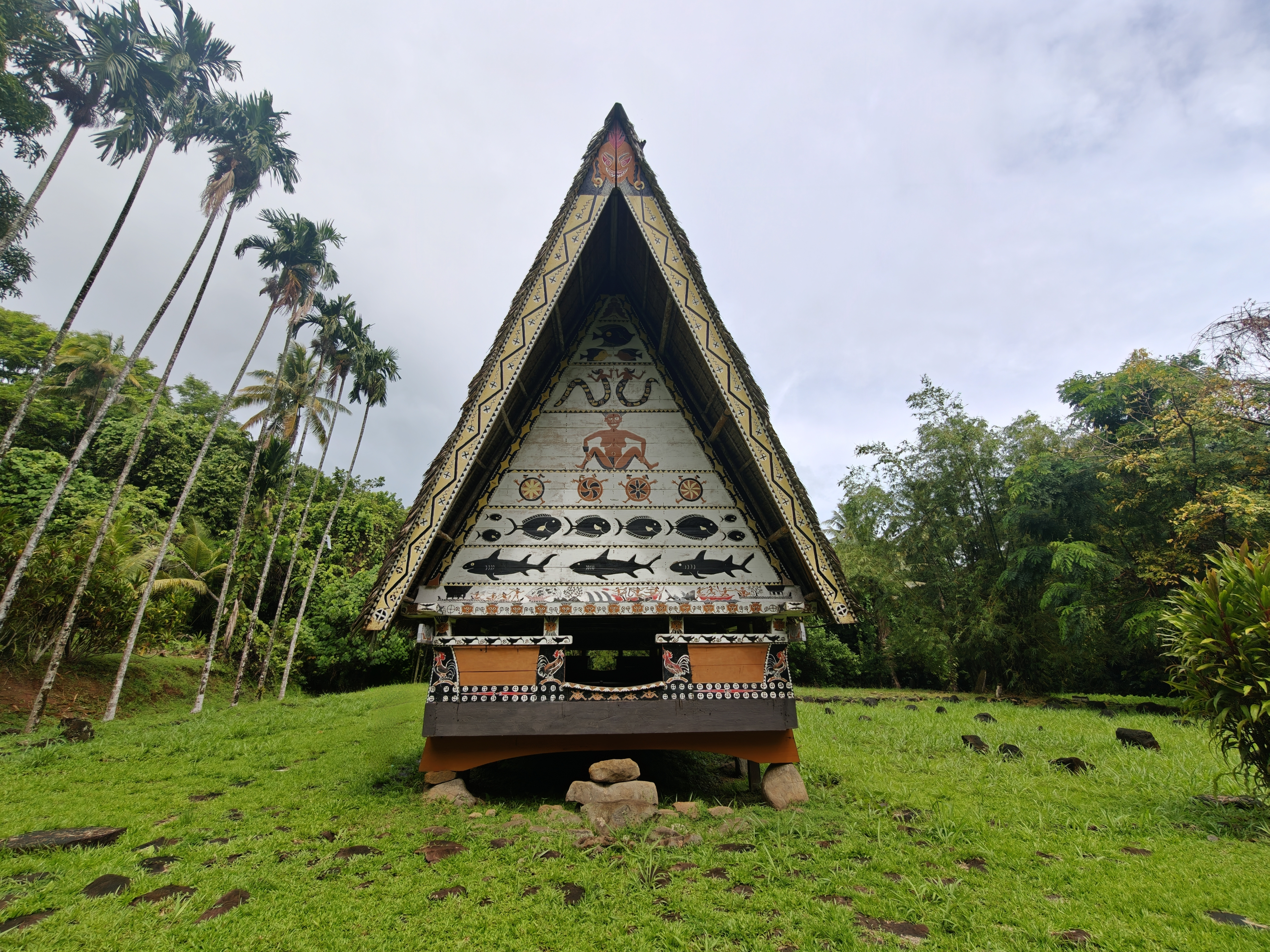
Bai Melekeong, Melekeok

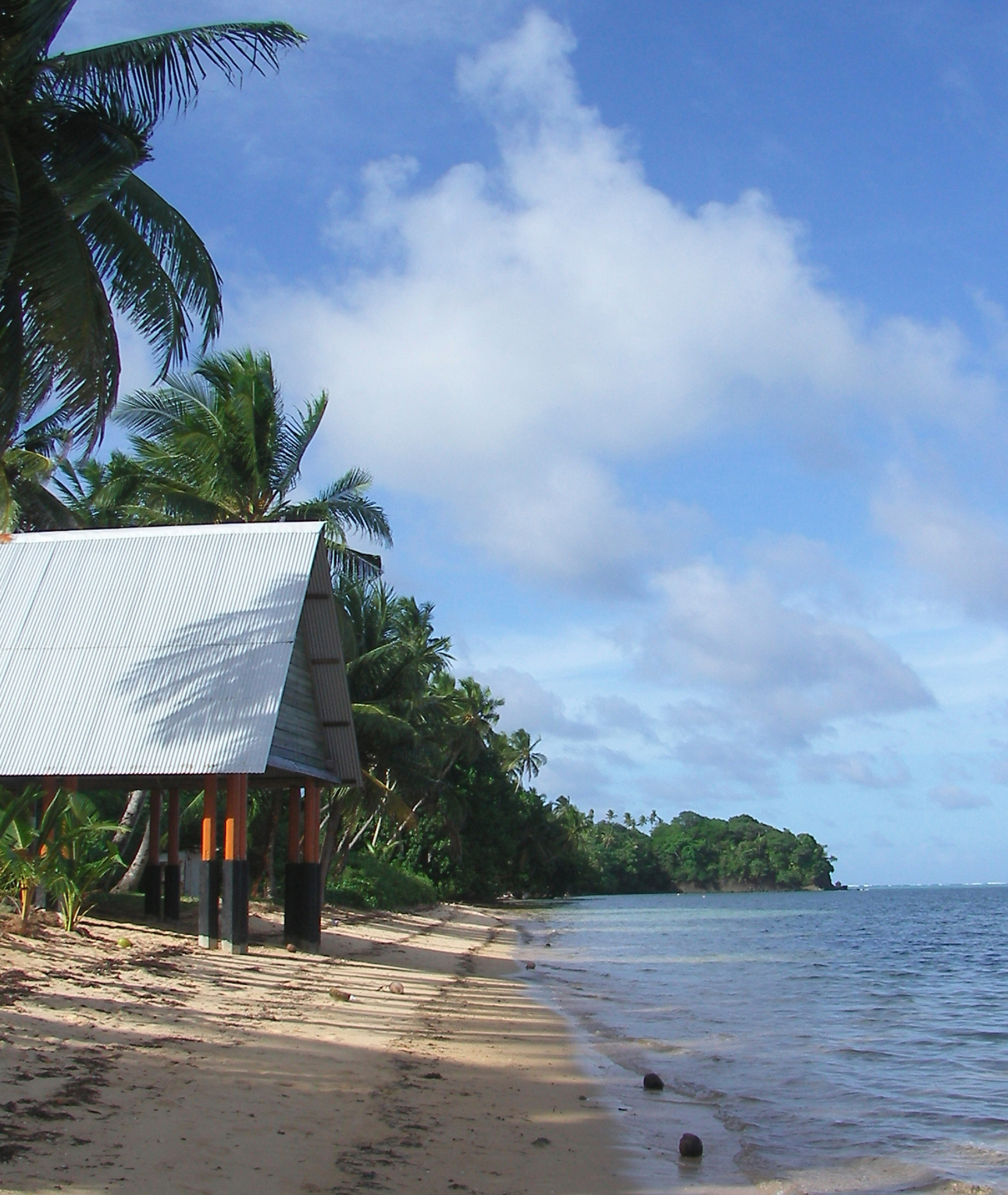
Beach of Melekeok State

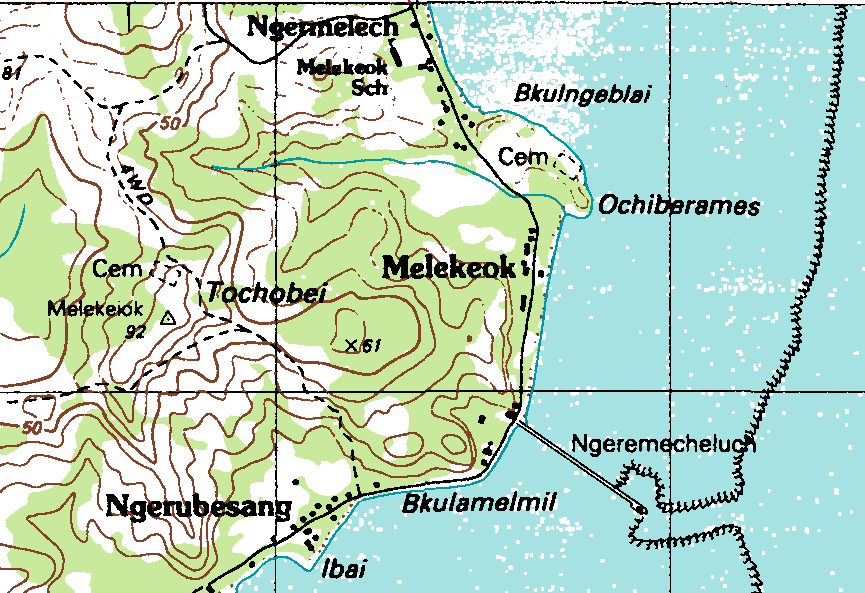
Melekeok area on topographic map
