= Naval Base Palau =

Naval Base Palau may refer to US Navy Base during World War II at:

- Naval Base Peleliu in southern Palau
  - Naval Base Angaur in southern Palau
- Naval Base Kossol Roads in the northern Palau
