= Naval Base Peleliu =

Major World War 2 base

Peleliu Naval Base
- United States Navy
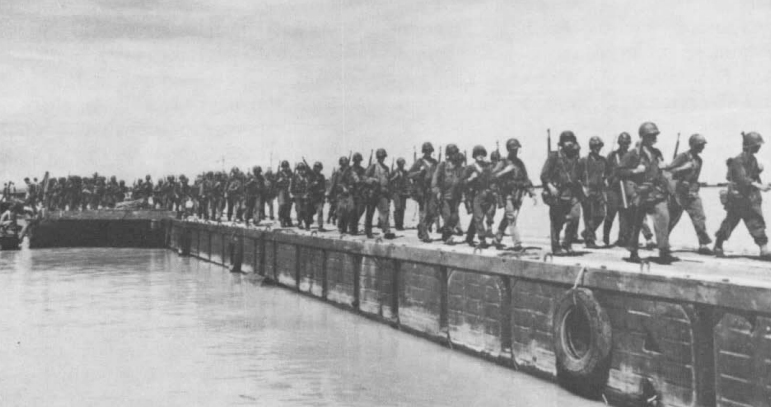
- US Army 81st Infantry Division arrives at Peleliu Naval Base on October 20, 1944

- Location of Peleliu Naval Base in Palau
- Coordinates: 7°0′N 134°15′E
- Administration: United States Navy (1944 to 1947)

Area
  - Total: 5.0 sq mi (13 km^{2})

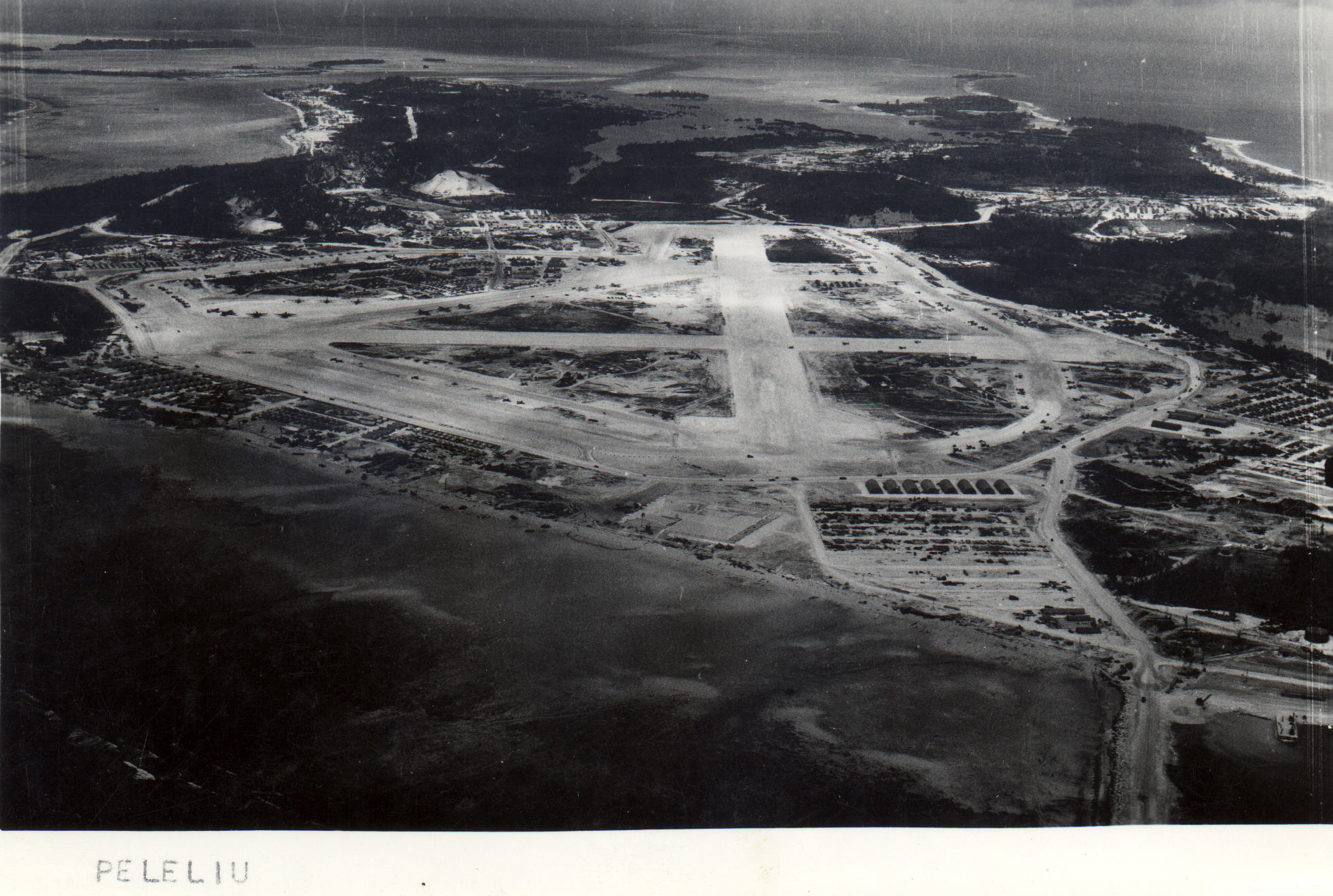
Peleliu Airfield in 1945

South Pacific islands in 1945

Peleliu Naval Base was a major United States Navy sea and airbase base on Peleliu island, one of sixteen states of Palau. The United States Marine Corps took the island in the Battle of Peleliu during World War II. Battle of Peleliu was a costly conflict that started September 15, 1944, and ended November 27, 1944. On September 30, 1944, Peleliu is declared occupied. The taking of Peleliu and Morotai gave the sea and air protection needed for the later invasion of the Philippines. US Navy Seabee built a number of facilities at Peleliu Naval Base.

== History ==
Empire of Japan had built up a very strong force on Palau and Truk. Japan had built two runways in an X pattern on the southern part of the island, now the Peleliu Airfield. The runways were about 3,900 feet long. Peleliu island is 5 1/2 half miles long and 2 1/2 miles wide. The coast is mostly rocky and has about 2 miles of sandy beaches. On October 12, 1944, Peleliu becomes the Marine island command center. October 20, 1944, the 1st Marine Division on Peleliu was relieved by the United States Army 81st Infantry Division. Three US Navy Seabee groups were part of the US Marine's landing on Peleliu on September 15, 1944. The 33rd Seabee Battalions and 73rd Seabee Battalions, with Construction Battaltion Detachment 1054 helped get supplies on the beaches. The nature of the reefs around the island made getting supplies ashore difficult. Seabees used 24 self-propelled pontoon barges to shuttle cargo ashore. Three days after the landing Seabees built a pontoon floating pier to get out past the reef. On the four days after landing LST ships started to unload large cargo on the beach. With the airfield secured, Seabees removed debris and mines. On the fifth day after landing Seabees brought the Seabees' construction equipment to the airfield and started repair work. The eighth day after landing, September 23, the 4,000-foot airfield was opened and three squadrons of fighter planes landed and provided ground support for the troops still fighting. VMO-1 a Marine Observation Squadron also started operation from the Airfield. Seabees 33rd Battalion started construction of a runway that long-range bombers could use, 6,000 feet long, on September 23. On September 23, the bomber runway was opened and in used 24/7. During this time Seabees also built vast support facilities. At Blue Beach, a pontoon causeway was built for unloading and loading landing craft tank (LCT), completed on November 1, 1944. On November 16, 1944, Marine Vought F4U Corsair from Peleliu and Grumman TBF Avenger from Ulithi launch an attack on Empire of Japan troops on Yap Island. Because the captured Peleliu dock was small and not yet a deep enough, amphibious operations continued. LST-19 and LST-225 were some of the amphibious ships used to shuttle cargo ashore. Between November 4 and 9, 1944 a typhoon hit Peleliu. Some ships and some facilities were damaged but was quickly repaired. November 27, 1944 VMF-541, a night fighter squadron with Grumman F6F Hellcat of the United States Marine Corps. move to Leyte, they had been on Peleliu for four months. Peleliu Naval Base lacked a large protected fleet anchorage, thus Naval Base Ulithi became the US Navy's primary fleet support base in the western Pacific. The Army air base was abandoned in June 1945. Seabees dismantled and boxed up usable structures and goods, shipping them out starting July 11, 1945. The last Marines departed Peleliu Naval Base on July 1, 1947. Naval Base Peleliu did not have a port for fleet anchorage, the US Navy used Naval Base Kossol Roads at the north tip of Palau.

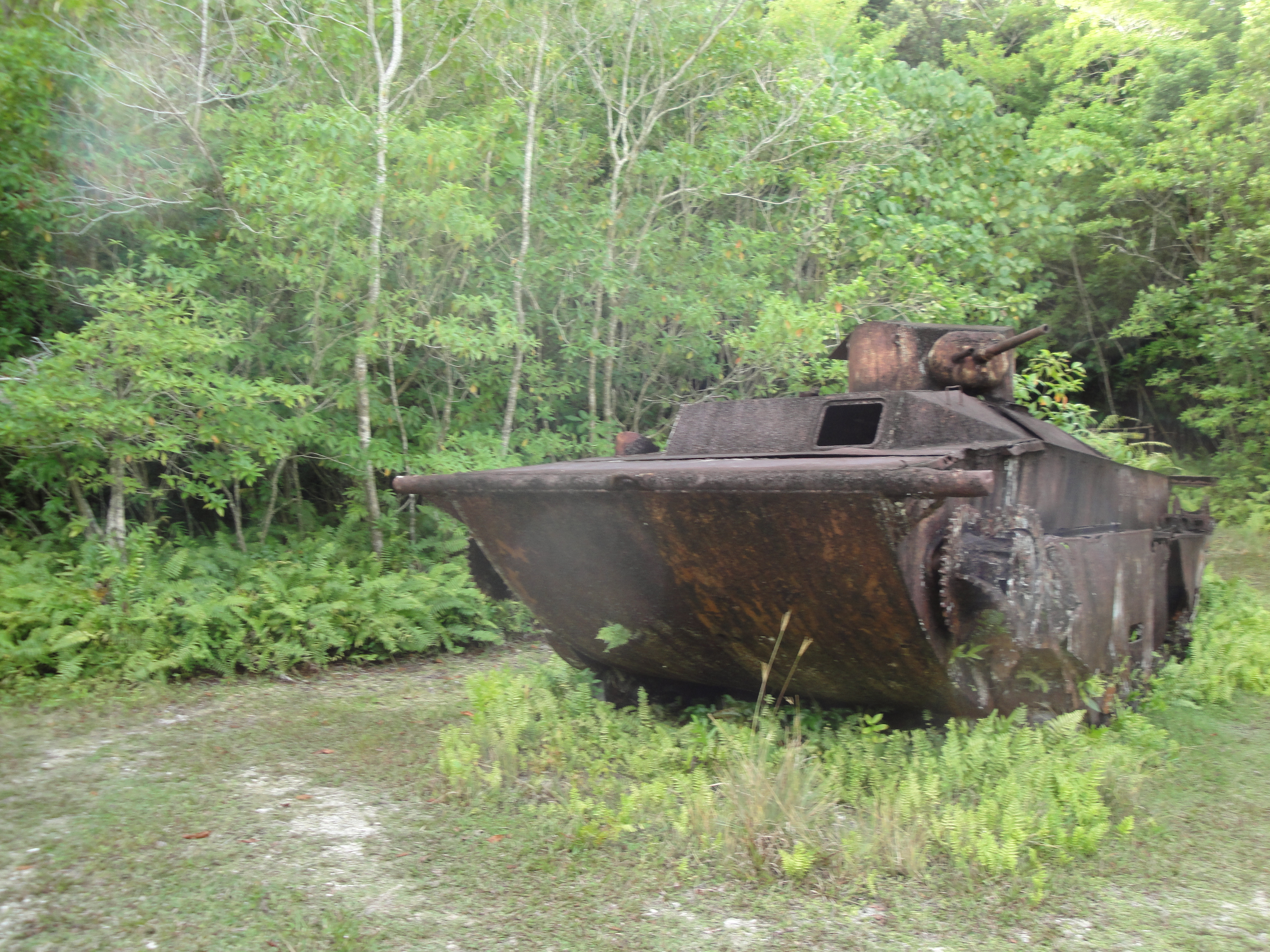
American World War II Landing Vehicle Tracked (Armored) LVT(A)-1 at Peleliu

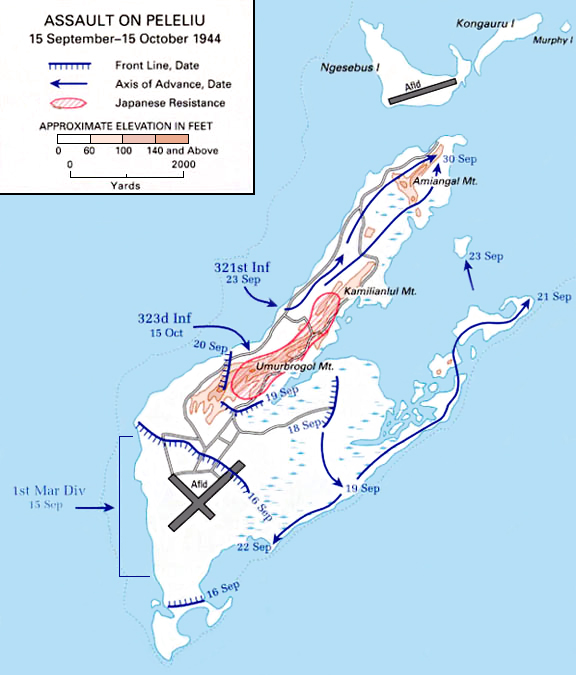
Map of the battle of Peleliu, with two X runways

== Facilities ==
- Peleliu dock at 6.985498°N 134.221002°E
- Peleliu Airfield captured September 17, 1944
- Concrete-block pier
- Seabees Camp
- Seabees depot
- Aviation shop
- Naval supply depot
- Army supply depot
- Headquarters
- Fleet Post Office FPO# 3252 SF Peleliu, Palau Islands
- Barracks – tent cities
- Tank farm for aviation fuel
- Tank farm for gasoline
- Tank farm for diesel
- Naval hospital No. 20
- Army Evacuation Hospital, 17th Army
- Hospital
- Dispensaries
- Improved LCT landing beach
- Marine railway
- Dry dock
- Small-boat repair shop
- Ammunition magazine depot
- 16 miles of main roads
- Crash boat base
- Motor pool
- Mess halls
- Navy Communication Center
- Power stations

== Naval Base Angaur ==
Angaur is a small island 9 miles south of Peleliu, taken over after the Battle of Angaur. The US Army and Seabee built some facilities on the island:

- US Army 7,000-foot airstrip, Angaur Airstrip
- Hardstands for 120 planes
- Tank farm – 1,000-barrel aviation gasoline, 20,000-barrel diesel, 5,000-barrel motor gasoline
- Aviation Barracks – quonset-huts
- coral breakwater small boat harbor
- 70-foot pier
- Boat shop
- 30-ton marine railway
- Aircraft boneyard at airstrip
  - Angaur Troops
- US Army Air Force 494th Bombardment Group (494th BG), 864th BS (B-24) September 30, 1944 – June 24, 1945
- US Army Air Force 494th BG, 865th BS (Consolidated B-24 Liberator, B-24) September 30, 1944 – June 24, 1945
- US Army Air Force 494th BG, 866th BS (B-24) Barking Sands September 30, 1944 – June 24, 1945
- US Army Air Force 494th BG, 867th BS (B-24) Barking Sands September 30, 1944 – June 24, 1945
- US Army Air Force 22nd Bombardment Group, HQ, 33rd BS (B-24) November 26, 1944 – June 24, 1945
- US Army Air Force 22nd BG, 2nd BS (B-24) November 28, 1944 – January 20, 1945
- US Army Air Force 22nd BG, 408th BS (B-24) December 1, 1944 – January 14, 1945
- US Army Air Force 22nd BG, 19th BS (B-24) December 3, 1944 – January 27, 1945
- US Army Air Force 419th TCG (Douglas C-47 Skytrain detachment) January 31, 1945
- US Marine Corps VMF-114
- US Marine Corps VMF-121
- US Marine Corps VMF-122

== Troops ==
Some Troop stationed at Peleliu:

- US Army Air Force, 28th PRS (F-5), Photographic Reconnaissance Squadron, September 24, 1944 – April 1, 1945, departed to Saipan
- US Army Air Force, 421st Night Fighters, NFS (6 Northrop P-61 Black Widow) January 1945 – February 1945
- US Marine Corps, VMF(N)-541 (F6F-3N) September 24, 1944 (Night fighter Grumman F6F Hellcat)
- US Marine Corps, MABS-1, Marine Air Base Squadron 1, May 1945
- US Navy, VR-13 (R4D), Patrol Squadron 1945
- US Navy, Naval Air Transport Service (NATS) 1945

== Post War ==
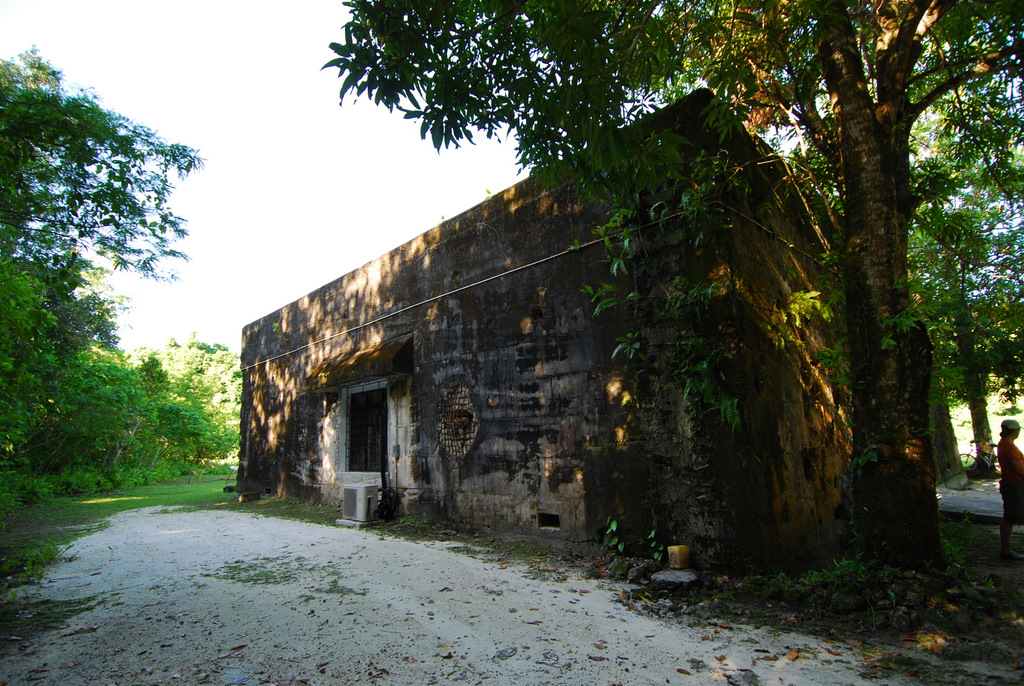
Peleliu World War II Memorial Museum

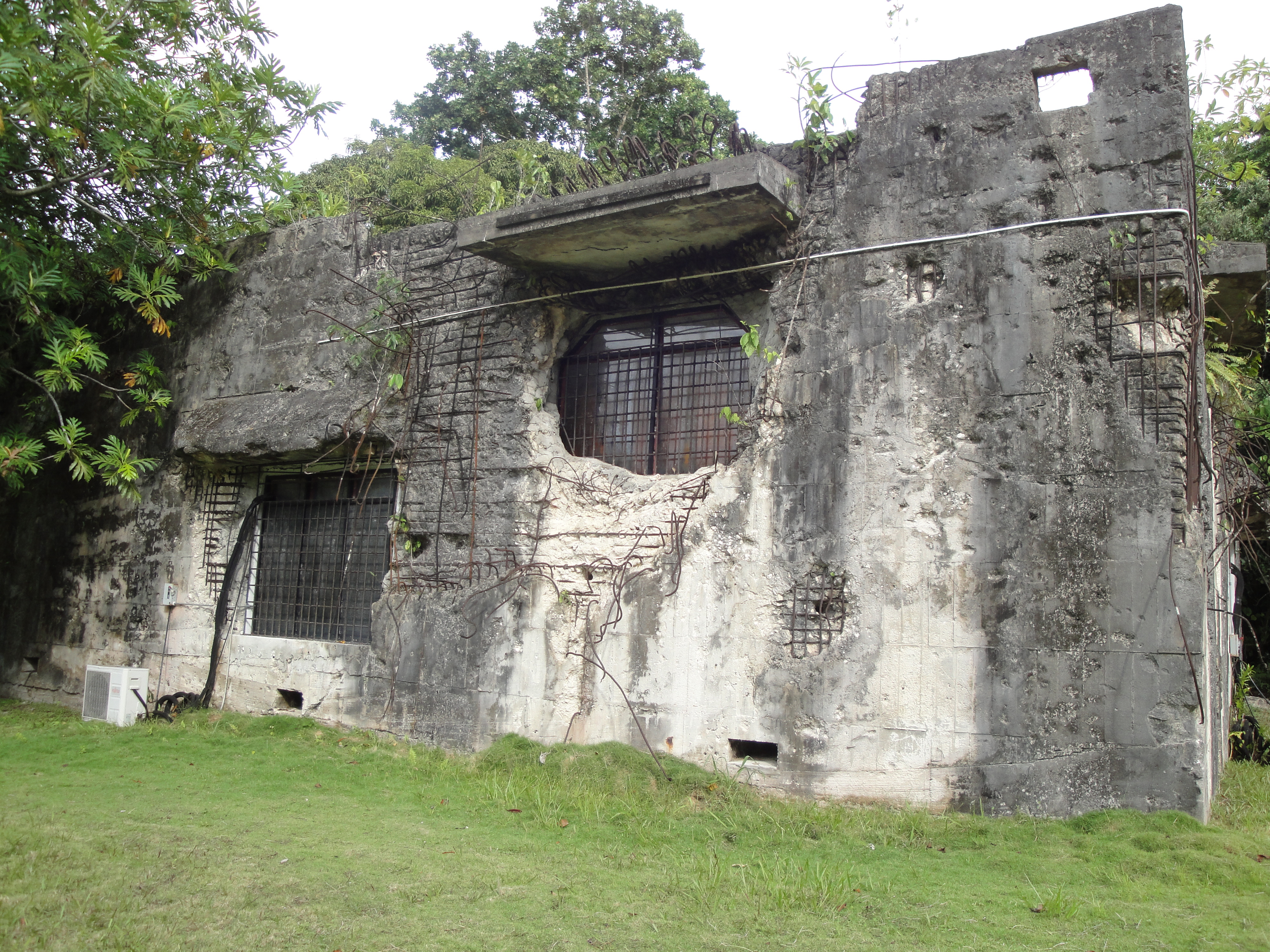
Peleliu World War II Memorial Museum ruins

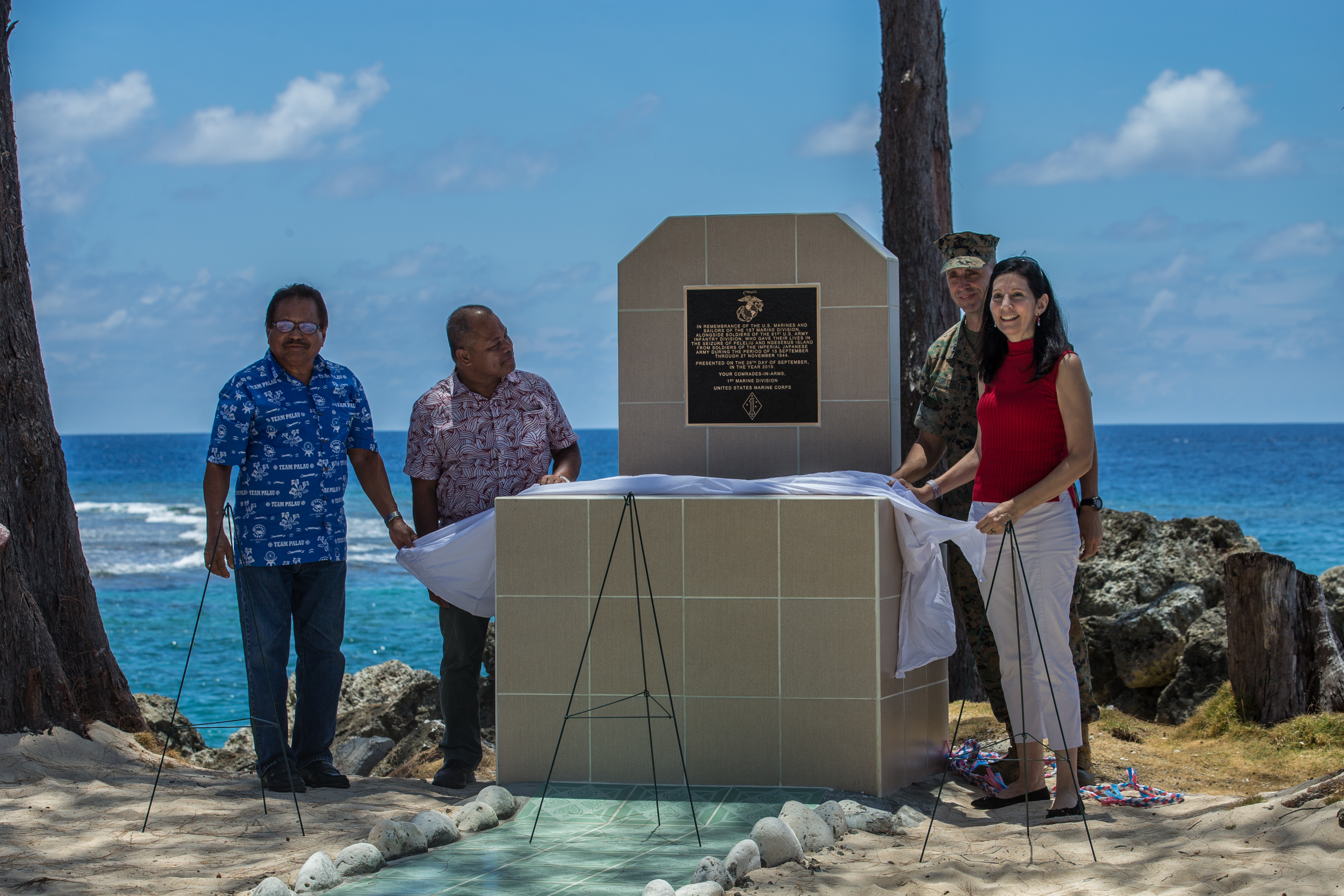
75th Commemoration of the Battle of Peleliu at the Marine Memorial

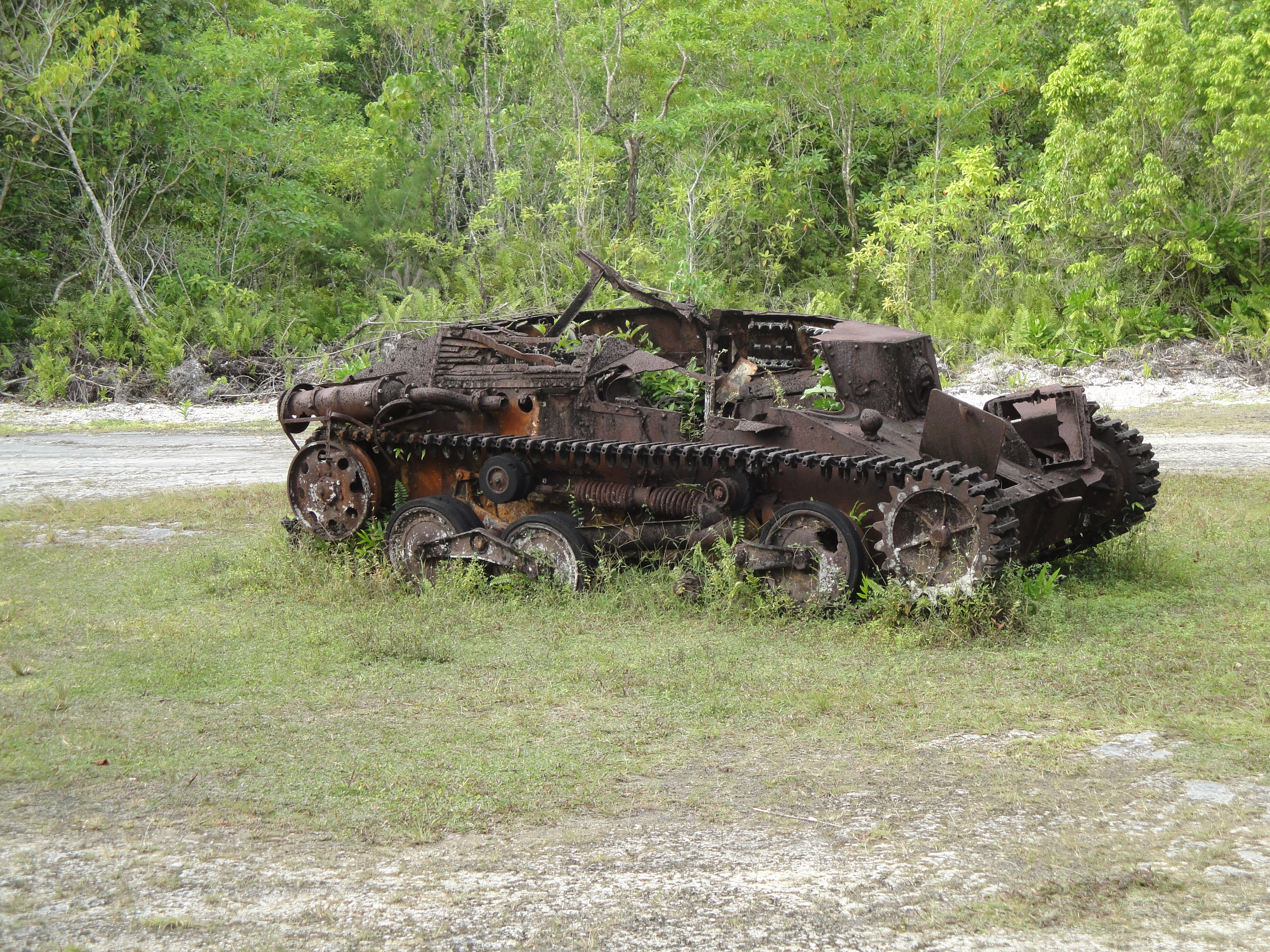
Japanese World War II Tank at Peleliu

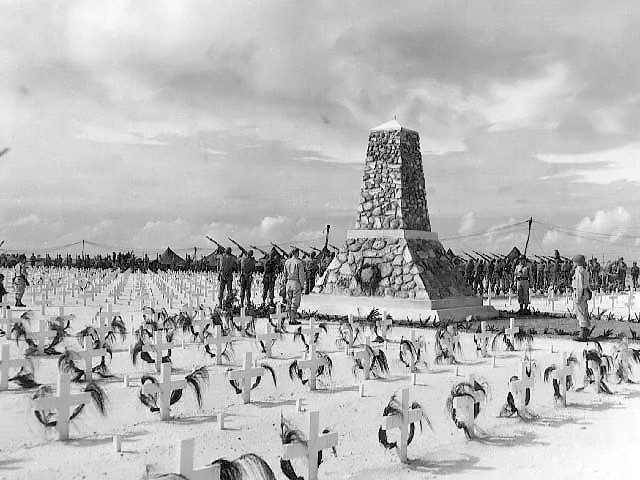
Armed Forces Cemetery dedication ceremonies on Peleliu 1944

In 1947, Peleliu was officially put under United States control, with United Nations approval. It became a part of the Trust Territory of the Pacific Islands. In 1978 Palau became an independent Nation, and Peleliu a state in the nation.

- Lieutenant Ei Yamaguchi and 33 of his troops hid out on Peleliu not knowing the war had ended. In March 1947, the troops attacked US Marines on Peleliu. To stop the attacks an admiral of Japan came and talk to them, they then knew the war was over. Ei Yamaguchi and his men surrendered in April 1947.
- Peleliu World War II Memorial Museum is near white beach one at 7.006226°N 134.22601°E. Peleliu World War II Memorial Museum had artifacts and information from the 1944 Battle of Peleliu. The Peleliu World War II Memorial Museum was built in a damaged Japanese warehouse.
- Peleliu Peace Memorial Park is on the south tip of the island at 6.973692°N 134.224992°E, near Scarlet Beach1. Built to remember the troops who lost their lives at the Battle of Peleliu in 1944.
- 1st Marine Division Memorial at Scarlet Beach1 at 6.973577°N 134.225310°E.
- 81st Infantry Division Memorial near Orange Beach Two at 6.991624°N 134.224131°E, east of Peleliu Airfield.
- Monument to the 323rd Infantry Regiment, a coral obelisk at Bloody Nose Ridge (Umurbrogol), for the 323rd Regiment of the U.S. Army's 81st Infantry Division at 7.012136°N 134.235603°E.
- Bloody Nose Ridge 1st Marine Division Memorial, Peliliu US Military Monument, near Shinto Shrinea at 7.010677°N 134.236119°E.
- Japanese Memorial Graveyard is 1.5 km south of the city of Kloulklubed at 7.029309°N 134.248620°E.
- Peleliu Battlefield is a National Register of Historic Places listings in Palau
- There was a large US Military Cemetery on Peliliu. Since then, were moved to other Cemeteries. At the former US Military Cemetery on Peleliu, is a cross and marker of the former cemetery.
- Over the island are a number of artifacts from the war:Japanese Tank type 95, Bomb shelters, Japanese 200 mm Cannon, Bulldozer Wreck, Ei Yamaguchi Hideout, Thousand Man Cave hideout, US Marines Landing Vehicle Tracked, crashed Avenger Aircraft atop Hill 100, crashed Japanese Zero fighter and more.

== See also ==
- US Naval Base Carolines
- Fury in the Pacific
- Japanese holdout
- USS Peleliu, an amphibious assault ship named in memory of the battle
- U.S. Naval Base Subic Bay
- Espiritu Santo Naval Base
- US Naval Advance Bases
- Naval Advance Base Saipan
- Service Squadron
- USAAF in the Central Pacific
