= VMF-541 =

Marine Fighter Squadron 541
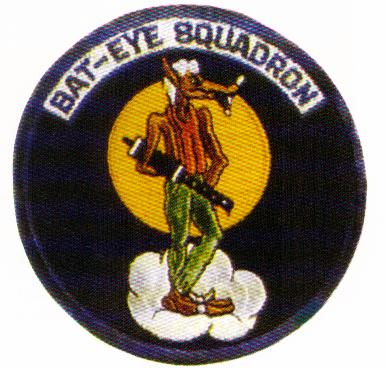
- VMF(N)-541's Insignia
- Active: 15 February 1944 – 30 April 1946
- Country: United States
- Allegiance: United States of America
- Branch: United States Marine Corps
- Type: Night Fighter squadron
- Role: air combat maneuvering
- Part of: Decommissioned
- Nickname: Bat Eyes
- Engagements: Philippines campaign (1944–45)

Marine Fighter Squadron 541 (VMF-541) was a reserve fighter squadron of the United States Marine Corps. Originally commissioned during World War II as a night fighter unit flying the F6F-5N Hellcat, the squadron participated in combat action over Peleliu and while supporting the liberation of the Philippines in 1944–45. During the war, VMF(N)-541 was credited with downing 23 Japanese aircraft. Following the war, the squadron participated in the occupation of Northern China until returning to the States to be decommissioned on 20 April 1946. The squadron was reactivated sometime after the war in the Marine Corps Reserve until being decommissioned again in the early 1960s.

== History ==
=== Formation, training and movement overseas ===
Marine Night Fighter Squadron 541 (VMF(N)-541) was commissioned on 15 February 1944, at Marine Corps Air Station Cherry Point, North Carolina with Maj Peter Lambrecht serving as the first commanding officer. On 14 March, the squadron commenced training for aerial combat at night and in poor weather and low visibility. Training was complete on 17 July and on 20 July the squadron's ground echelon departed for the West Coast. The aircraft departed MCAS Cherry Point on 22 July with all elements of the squadron having arrived in California by 26 July. On 9 August the squadron boarded the USS Long Island (CVE-1) and sailed from Naval Air Station North Island arriving at Espiritu Santoon 25 August.

=== Peleliu ===
On 24 September 1944, eight fighters from VMF(N)-541, flying in from Emirau, landed on Peleliu escorted by an R5C flown by MajGen James T. Moore. On the evening of 31 October, Maj Norman Mitchell from VMF(N)-541 became the only Marine to shoot down a Japanese aircraft in the Palaus when he intercepted an Aichi E13A JAKE Observation seaplane. During the squadron's time on Peleliu it flew 287 night-bombing missions and 461 nighttime Combat air patrols. Three F6F Hellcats were lost during this time with all three pilots surviving the incidents. At the end of November, a request was received from US Army forces in the Philippines for a land-based night fighter squadron flying F6Fs because the local P-61 Black Widows were being outclassed by Japanese aircraft. The squadron was alerted to move on 28 November and twelve VMF(N)-541 night fighters departed Peleliu on 3 December 1944, flying 602 miles west to Tacloban Airfield.

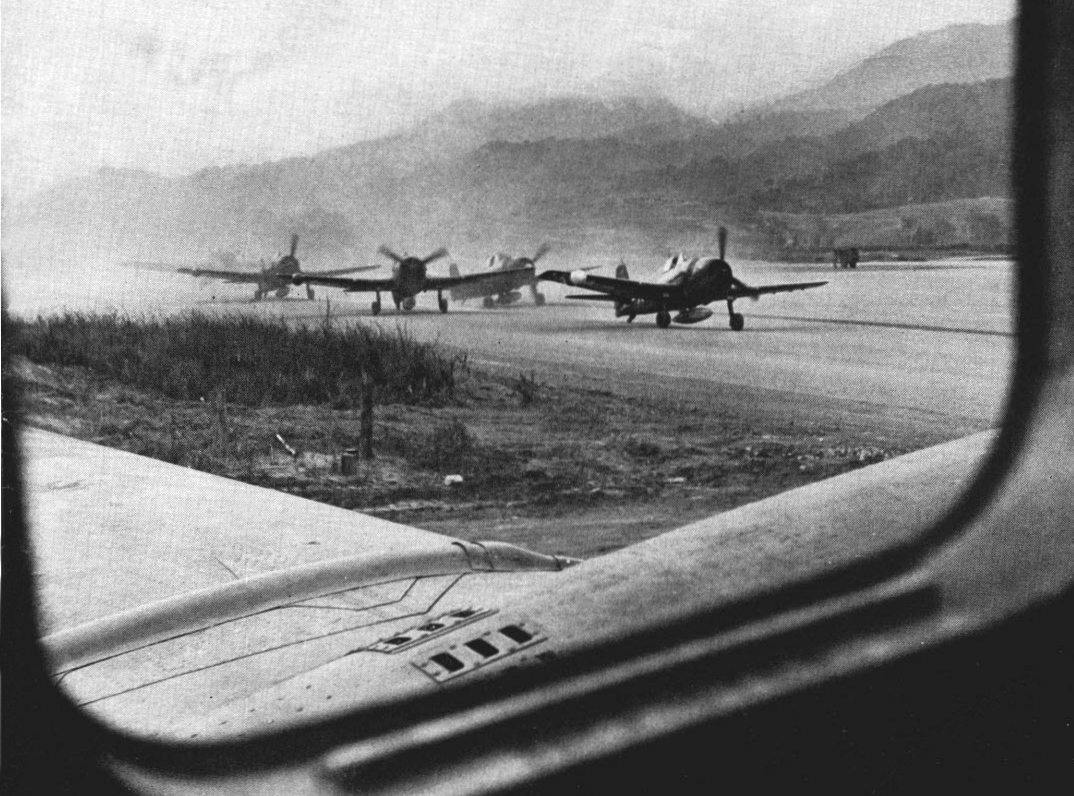
F6F-5N Hellcats of Marine Night Fighting Squadron 541 (VMF(N)-541) take off from Peleliu, in 1944.

=== Philippines ===
VMF(N)-541 was the first Marine squadron to land at Tacloban. It was assigned to the 308th Bombardment Wing and began flying the same evening it arrived. VMF(N)-541 assumed facilities that had been left by the 421st Night Fighter Squadron. Initial tasking for the squadron did not involve maintaining a continuous overhead presence at night as had been expected. Instead, the squadron was asked to conduct combat patrols at dawn and dusk when leadership viewed itself as most vulnerable. The squadron netted its first victory in the Philippines on 5 December when Second Lieutenant Rodney Montgomery Jr. downed a Nakajima Ki-43 OSCAR. On the morning of 12 December, three fighters from VMF(N)-541 were flying off of the west coast of Leyte when they were vectored toward a large formation of thirty-three Japanese aircraft split into five separate groups heading towards the US Fleet in Ormoc Bay. The squadron's fighters immediately engaged and were credited with downing 12 Japanese aircraft at the end of the fighting. This marked the largest one-day tally for the squadron during the war.

Beginning on 15 December, the squadron provided aerial protection for the US landing at Mindoro. Dawn/dusk patrols and providing protection to allied convoys in the area continued until 3 January 1945, when a Japanese aircraft was able to strafe the runway at Tacloban multiple times. From that point forward, VMF(N)-541 was tasked with continuous nighttime combat air patrols. While in the Philippines, the squadron flew 312 sorties equaling 924 combat hours. It was credited with downing 20 Japanese aircraft and destroying another five more on the ground. VMF(N)-541 departed the Philippines headed back to Peleliu on 11 January 1945. For actions in support of the United States Army in the Philippines, the squadron became the only Marine Aviation unit to be awarded the United States Army's Distinguished Unit Citation.

=== Remainder of the war and occupation duty ===
VMF(N)-541 continued flying combat air patrols from Peleliu. On 23 March 1945, a six-plane detachment and maintenance personnel were sent to Falalop Airfield to assist with local air interdiction after having been trained in nighttime dive bombing. The squadron was operating from both Peleliu and Falalop when the Japanese surrendered. The Falalop detachment returned to Peleliu on 28 August in anticipation of follow-on movement of the squadron. In September 1945 the squadron departed Peleliu for China. After a two-week stint on Okinawa, the advanced flight echelon arrived at Nanyuan Airfield on 8 October with all elements of the squadron arriving by 5 November. While in China the squadron was responsible for flying combat air patrols and reconnaissance flights. VMF(N)-541 returned to the United States in 1946 and was decommissioned on 30 April 1946.

=== Reserve years ===
After the war VMF-541 was reactivated in the reserves on June 5, 1949, at Naval Air Station Birmingham, Alabama. On 10 January 1951, VMF-541 personnel were assigned to extended active duty as part of the call up of reserves in support of the Korean War mobilization. On 4 March 1951, VMF(N)-541 was the first Marine Corps squadron to win the Pete Ross Safety Award, beating out 29 other Marine Corps squadrons.

== See also ==
- United States Marine Corps Aviation
- List of United States Marine Corps aircraft squadrons
- List of decommissioned United States Marine Corps aircraft squadrons
