= Regions of Kazakhstan =

First-level administrative divisions of Kazakhstan

Regions of Kazakhstan Қазақстан облыстары (Kazakh) Области Казахстана (Russian)
- Also known as: Province Oblast
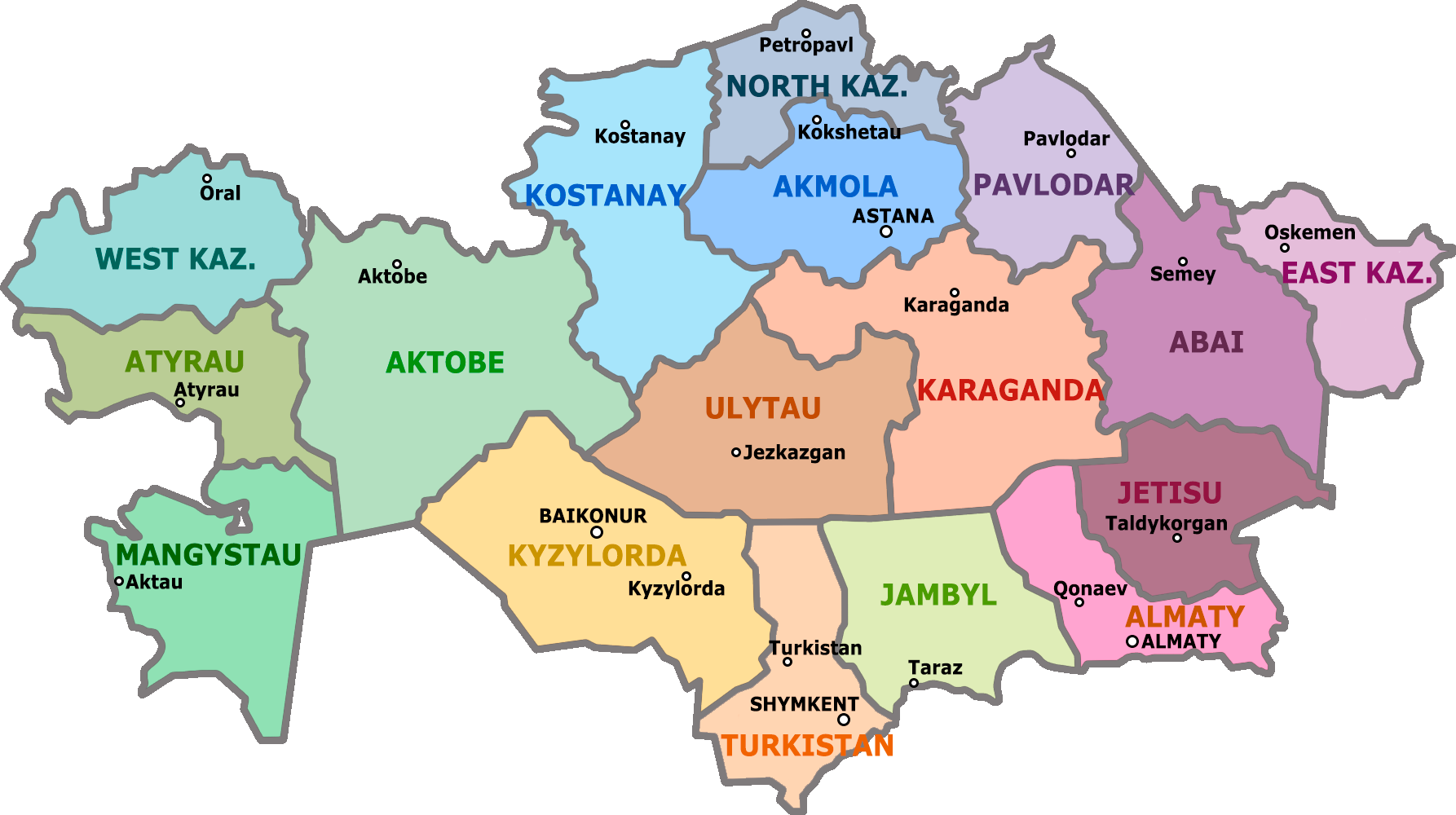
- Category: Unitary state
- Location: Republic of Kazakhstan
- Number: 17 regions and 4 cities (Almaty, Astana, Baikonur and Shymkent)
- Populations: 36,175 (Baikonur) – 2,685,009 (Turkistan)
- Areas: 680 km^{2} (263 sq mi) (Almaty) – 300,630 km^{2} (116,074 sq mi) (Aktobe)
- Government: Regional government, National government
- Subdivisions: District

Kazakhstan is divided into 17 regions (Note: Kazakh: облыстар, romanized: oblystar; sing. облыс, oblys; Russian: области, romanized: oblasti; sing. область, oblast) and 4 cities. The regions are further subdivided into districts. (Note: Kazakh: аудандар, romanized: audandar; sing. аудан, audan; Russian: районы, romanized: rayony; sing. район, rayon) The four cities, Almaty, Baikonur, Shymkent, and the capital city Astana, do not belong to their surrounding regions.

The regions are also referred to as oblasts, which were one of the second-level subdivisions of the Kazakh Soviet Socialist Republic, a constituent republic of the Soviet Union. After gaining independence in 1991, there were 17 regions as of 1989.

On 16 March 2022, Kazakh President Kassym-Jomart Tokayev announced that three new regions would be created. Abai Region was created from East Kazakhstan Region with its capital in Semey. Ulytau Region was created from Karaganda Region with its capital in Jezkazgan. Jetisu Region was created from Almaty Region with its capital in Taldykorgan; Almaty Region's capital was moved from Taldykorgan to Qonayev.

== Regions ==
Emblem	Full English name	Type	Capital	Full Kazakh name	Full Russian name
	Abai Region	region	Semey	Абай облысы Abai oblysy	Абайская область Abaiskaya Oblast'
	Akmola Region	region	Kokshetau	Ақмола облысы Aqmola oblysy	Акмолинская область Akmolinskaya Oblast'
	Aktobe Region	region	Aktobe	Ақтөбе облысы Aqtöbe oblysy	Актюбинская область Aktyubinskaya Oblast'
	Almaty	city^{[nb 1]}		Алматы қаласы Almaty qalasy	город Алматы gorod Almaty
	Almaty Region	region	Qonaev	Алматы облысы Almaty oblysy	Алматинская область Almatinskaya Oblast'
	Astana	city^{[nb 1]}		Астана қаласы Astana qalasy	город Астана gorod Astana
	Atyrau Region	region^{[nb 2]}	Atyrau	Атырау облысы Atyrau oblysy	Атырауская область Atyrauskaya Oblast'
	Baikonur	city^{[nb 3]}		Байқоңыр қаласы Baiqoñyr qalasy	город Байконур gorod Baykonur
	East Kazakhstan Region	region	Oskemen	Шығыс Қазақстан облысы Şyğys Qazaqstan oblysy	Восточно-Казахстанская область Vostochno-Kazakhstanskaya Oblast'
	Jambyl Region	region	Taraz	Жамбыл облысы Jambyl oblysy	Жамбылская область Zhambylskaya Oblast'
	Jetisu Region	region	Taldykorgan	Жетісу облысы Jetısu oblysy	Жетысуская область Zhetysuskaya Oblast'
	Karaganda Region	region	Karaganda	Қарағанды облысы Qarağandy oblysy	Карагандинская область Karagandinskaya Oblast'
	Kostanay Region	region	Kostanay	Қостанай облысы Qostanai oblysy	Костанайская область Kostanayskaya Oblast'
	Kyzylorda Region	region	Kyzylorda	Қызылорда облысы Qyzylorda oblysy	Кызылординская область Kyzylordinskaya Oblast'
	Mangystau Region	region	Aktau	Маңғыстау облысы Mañğystau oblysy	Мангыстауская область Mangystauskaya Oblast'
	North Kazakhstan Region	region	Petropavl	Солтүстік Қазақстан облысы Soltüstık Qazaqstan oblysy	Северо-Казахстанская область Severo-Kazakhstanskaya Oblast'
	Pavlodar Region	region	Pavlodar	Павлодар облысы Pavlodar oblysy	Павлодарская область Pavlodarskaya Oblast'
	Shymkent	city^{[nb 1]}		Шымкент қаласы Şymkent qalasy	город Шымкент gorod Shymkent
	Turkistan Region (formerly South Kazakhstan)	region	Turkistan	Түркістан облысы Türkıstan oblysy	Туркестанская область Turkestanskaya Oblast'
	Ulytau Region	region	Jezkazgan	Ұлытау облысы Ūlytau oblysy	Улытауская область Ulytauskaya Oblast'
	West Kazakhstan Region	region^{[nb 2]}	Oral	Батыс Қазақстан облысы Batys Qazaqstan oblysy	Западно-Казахстанская область Zapadno-Kazakhstanskaya Oblast'

- ^1 Almaty, Astana and Shymkent have the status of the city of republican significance, and as such do not relate to any region.
- ^2 The West Kazakhstan and Atyrau regions are both partly located in Eastern Europe as the Ural River runs through Atyrau and Oral, their respective capital cities.
- ^3 Baikonur city has a special status because it is currently being leased to Russia along with Baikonur Cosmodrome until the year 2050.

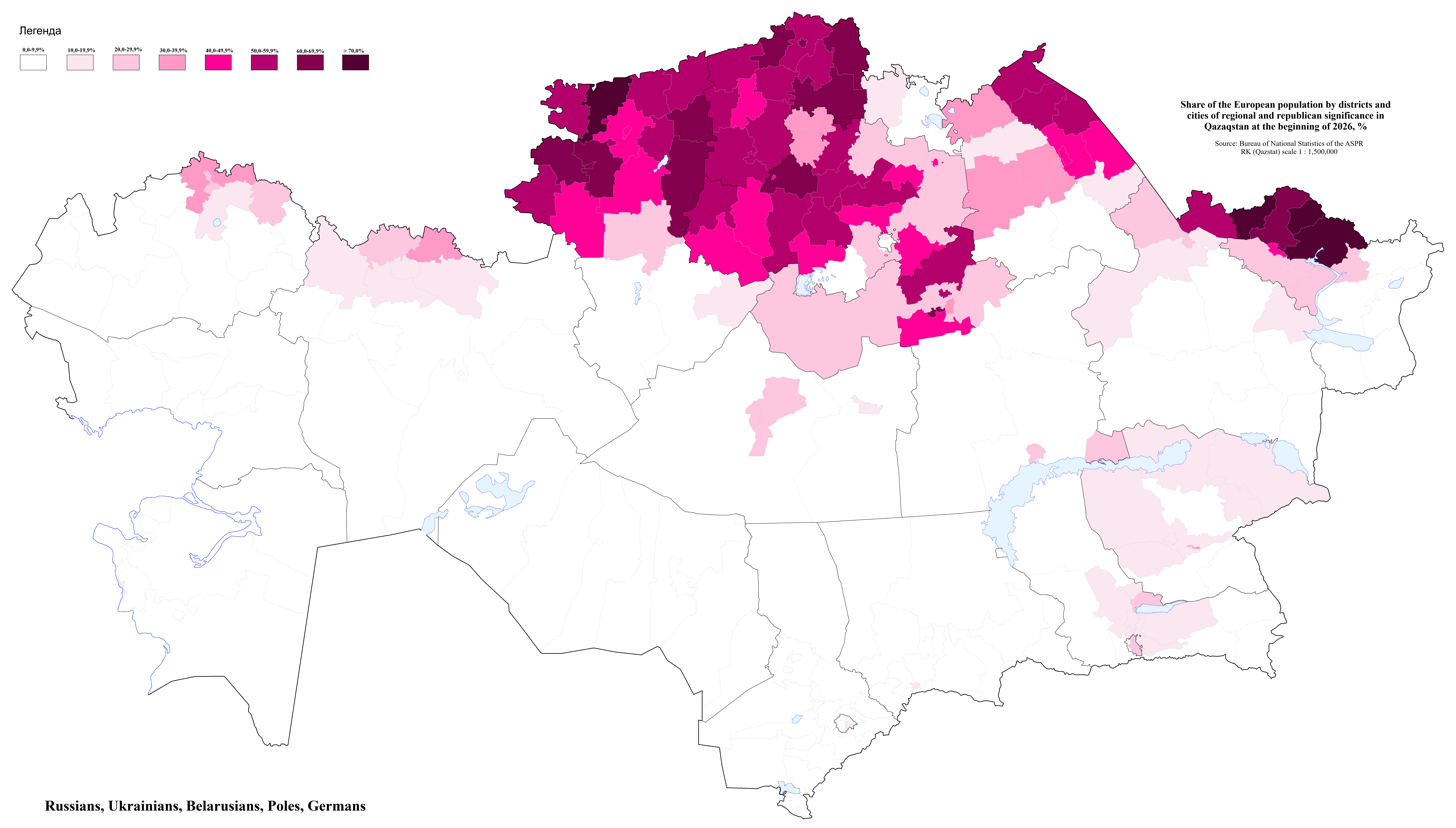
The share of the European population by districts and cities of regional and republican subordination Kazakhstan in 2026 ≥70% 60.0 – 69.9% 50.0 – 59.9% 40.0 – 49.9% 30.0 – 39.9% 20.0 – 29.9% 10.0 – 19.9% 0.0 – 9.9%

== Demographic statistics ==
In 2022, three new regions were created, the Abai (from part of East Kazakhstan), Jetisu (from part of Almaty Region), and Ulytau (from part of Karaganda Region) Regions. In the following table, the 2009 population totals have been amended to reflect the population in the new or altered regions.

Entity	Capital	Area (km^{2})	Population (2009)	Population (2022)	Density (2022)	ISO 3166-2
Abai Region	Semey	185,500	654,423	610,183	3.29	KZ-
Aqmola Region	Kokshetau	146,219	737,495	786,012	5.38	KZ-AKM
Aqtobe Region	Aqtobe	300,629	757,768	924,845	3.08	KZ-AKT
Almaty	Almaty	682	1,449,696	2,147,113	3,148.26	KZ-ALA
Almaty Region	Qonaev	105,100	1,103,237	1,497,025	14.24	KZ-ALM
Astana	Astana	797	613,006	1,340,782	1,682.29	KZ-AST
Atyrau Region	Atyrau	118,631	510,377	689,674	5.81	KZ-ATY
Baikonur	Baikonur	57	36,175	34,544	606.04	KZ-BAY*
East Kazakhstan Region	Oskemen	97,700	742,170	730,818	7.48	KZ-VOS
Jambyl Region	Taraz	144,264	1,022,129	1,215,482	8.43	KZ-ZHA
Jetisu Region	Taldyqorgan	118,500	620,593	698,952	5.90	KZ-
Karaganda Region	Karaganda	239,100	1,118,036	1,134,146	4.74	KZ-KAR
Kostanay Region	Kostanay	196,001	885,570	832,445	4.25	KZ-KUS
Kyzylorda Region	Kyzylorda	226,019	678,794	830,901	3.68	KZ-KZY
Mangystau Region	Aktau	165,642	485,392	761,401	4.60	KZ-MAN
North Kazakhstan Region	Petropavl	97,993	596,535	534,966	5.46	KZ-SEV
Pavlodar Region	Pavlodar	124,800	742,475	754,829	6.05	KZ-PAV
Shymkent	Shymkent	1,163	730,873	1,184,113	1,018.15	KZ-
Turkistan Region	Turkistan	116,100	1,738,484	2,110,502	18.18	KZ-TUR
West Kazakhstan Region	Oral	151,339	598,880	686,655	4.54	KZ-ZAP
Ulytau Region	Jezqazgan	188,900	223,664	221,014	1.17	KZ-

== Former administrative boundaries ==
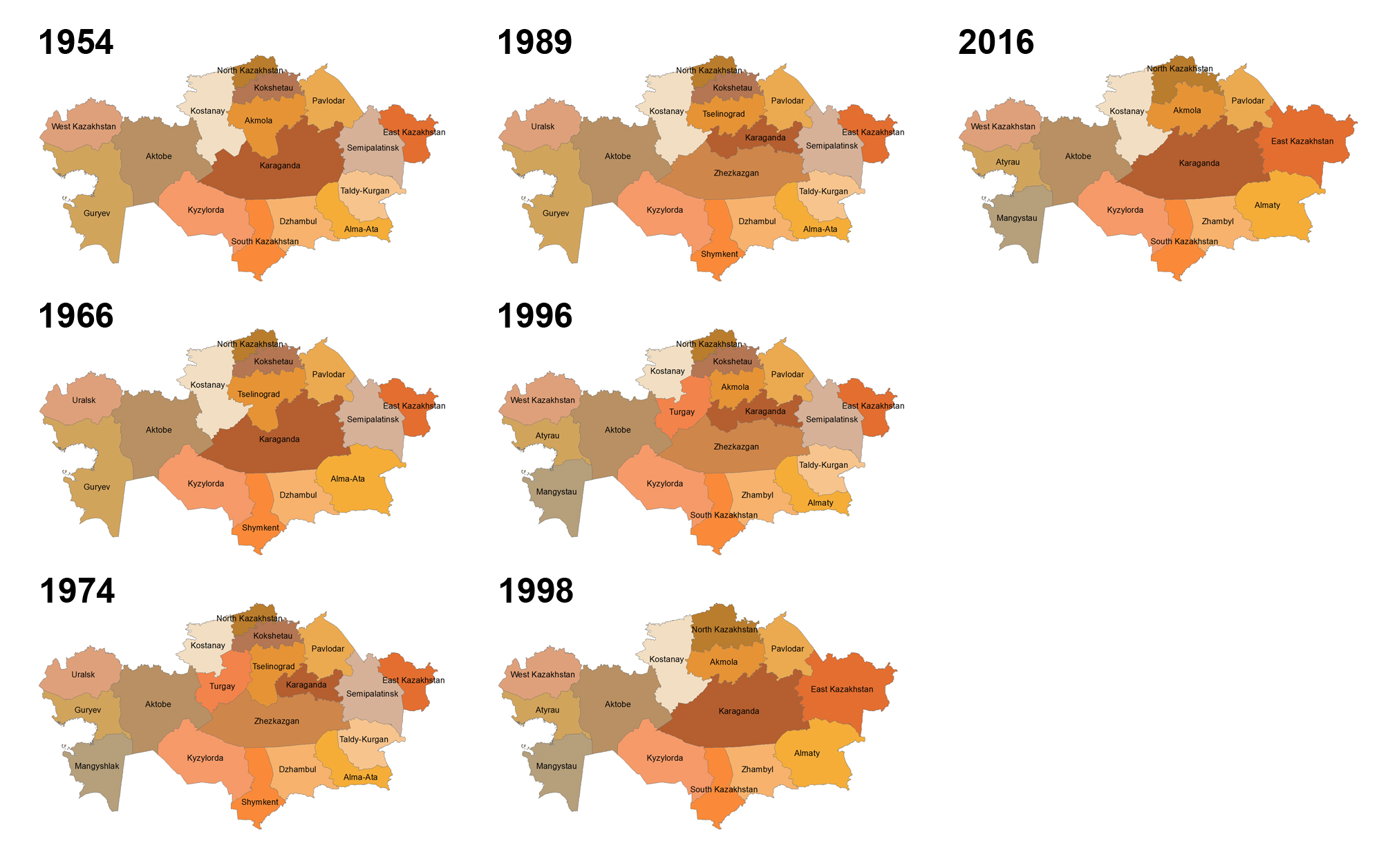
Change of oblast names and boundaries from 1954 to 2021

Over the last 60 years, both the distribution and names of regions of Kazakhstan have changed considerably. Major changes were several fusions and splits between Guryev and Mangystau, Karaganda and Dzhezkazgan, Almaty and Taldy-Kurgan, East Kazakhstan and Semipalatinsk and Kostanay, Turgay and Tselinograd, respectively. Changes in region names were often in line with the renaming of cities, such as in the case of Alma-Ata/Almaty. After the administrative reform in 1997, the last change happened since then took place in 1999, when parts of North Kazakhstan that originally belonged to Kokshetau region became part of Akmola. The 1990s merges were in order to dilute the Russian population in the resulting region and to avoid having regions where Russians form a majority.

== Sources ==
- GeoHive
