= City of republican significance (Kazakhstan) =

Administrative division in Kazakhstan

- Also known as: City of national importance
- Category: First-level administrative-territorial unit
- Location: Kazakhstan
- Found in: None (equal to region)
- Created by: On the Administrative–Territorial Structure of the Republic of Kazakhstan
- Created: 8 December 1993
- Number: 3 (as of 2025)
- Possible types: City
- Populations: ~1.2–2.0 million
- Areas: ~682–2,511 km²
- Government: Akim (Mayor) and City Administration
- Subdivisions: Districts

A city of republican significance (Kazakh: республикалық маңызы бар қала, romanized: respublikalyq mañyzy bar qala; Russian: город республиканского значения, romanized: gorod respublikanskogo znacheniya) is a special category of administrative-territorial unit in the Republic of Kazakhstan. Such a city is granted first-level administrative division, equal to that of an region (oblys) and is directly subordinate to the central government rather than to a regional authority.

As of 2025, Kazakhstan has three cities of republican significance: Almaty, Astana, and Shymkent.

== History ==
The category of city of republican significance reflects the Soviet legacy of union-republic capitals and cities of republican subordination (Kazakh: республикалық бағыныстағы қала, romanized: respublikalyq bağynystağy qala; Russian: город республиканского подчинения, romanized: gorod respublikanskogo podchineniya) but has been reshaped within the framework of Kazakhstan's independent legal and administrative order. In contemporary practice, such cities serve as focal centers of governance, economy, and culture, enjoying a degree of autonomy comparable to that of an oblast.

In the legislation of the Kazakh SSR, the term "city of republican significance" was not formally employed. Instead, the Soviet system distinguished between regional centers and cities of republican subordination, the latter being directly subordinate to the Republican Council of Ministers rather than to oblast authorities. Alma-Ata (now Almaty), which became the capital of the Kazakh ASSR in 1929 and of the Kazakh SSR in 1936, held this status throughout the Soviet period, being administered independently of Alma-Ata Oblast. Chapter 8, Article 77 of the 1978 Constitution of the Kazakh SSR explicitly codified Alma-Ata as a city of republican subordination, confirming its position outside regional jurisdiction.

The modern legal concept was introduced after Kazakhstan's independence in 1991. The first constitution of Kazakhstan, adopted on 28 January 1993, explicitly designated Almaty as the capital of the republic. Later that year, on 8 December 1993, the Law of the Republic of Kazakhstan No. 2572-XII "On the Administrative-Territorial Structure of the Republic of Kazakhstan" established three categories of cities, including the city of republican significance, thereby formalizing this category as a distinct element of the administrative-territorial system of the unitary state. Under this framework, Almaty held a dual status as both the national capital and a city of republican significance.

On 20 October 1997, President Nursultan Nazarbayev issued Decree No. 3700 "On Declaring the City of Akmola the Capital of the Republic of Kazakhstan", under which Akmola (now Astana) was designated the new capital starting 10 December 1997. On the same day, Presidential Decree No. 3698 "On the Status of the City of Almaty and Measures for its Further Development" was adopted, which immediately reclassified Almaty as solely a city of republican significance. With the transfer of the capital to Astana, the city acquired the status of a city of republican significance, joining Almaty as the second urban center to hold this designation.

On 19 June 2018, by Presidential Decree No. 702 "On Some Issues of the Administrative-Territorial Structure of the Republic of Kazakhstan", Shymkent was elevated to the status of a city of republican significance, thereby acquiring the legal position of an independent administrative-territorial unit on a par with a region. Having exceeded one million residents, Shymkent was separated from the former South Kazakhstan Region, which was simultaneously reorganized and renamed the Turkistan Region, becoming the third city of republican significance in Kazakhstan alongside Almaty and Astana.

== Legal definition ==
The status of a city of republican significance is established in the Law of the Republic of Kazakhstan "On the Administrative-Territorial Structure of the Republic of Kazakhstan". Under Article 3 of the law, a locality may be designated as a city of republican significance if it has a population of over one million people, or possesses special national importance for the Republic of Kazakhstan.

== Governance ==
Cities of republican significance exercise a degree of local self-administration comparable to oblasts. Their akimats (local governments) and mäslihats (local assemblies) report directly to the President and Government of Kazakhstan.

Powers include:

- establishing or reorganizing city districts (aūdandar),
- submitting proposals on administrative-territorial changes,
- determining local names in coordination with the state onomastic commission,
- overseeing local budgets and development programs.

The akim (mayor) of a republican city is appointed by the President of Kazakhstan.

== Current cities ==
As of 2025, Kazakhstan has three cities of republican significance.

Code	ISO code	Name	Flag	Coat of arms	Area (km^{2})	Population (2025 est.)	Notes
02	KZ-75	Almaty			682	2,319,893	Former capital until 1997; city of republican significance
01	KZ-71	Astana	Astana, Kazakhstan		797.33	1,576,337	Capital since 1997; city of republican significance
17	KZ-79	Shymkent			1162.8	1,277,743	Elevated 2018; third city of republican significance

== See also ==
- Administrative divisions of Kazakhstan
- Regions of Kazakhstan
- Akim
- Mäslihat
