= Independence Park =

Independence Park may refer to:

- Independence Park Botanic Gardens, a botanical garden in Baton Rouge, Louisiana
- Independence Park (Charlotte, North Carolina), a park in Charlotte, North Carolina
- Independence Park (Chicago), a park in Chicago, Illinois
- Independence Park (Guyana), Georgetown, Guyana
- Independence Park (Houston, Texas), an historic park located in Houston, Texas
- Independence Park (Jamaica), a stadium in Kingston, Jamaica
- Independence National Historical Park, a national park in Philadelphia, Pennsylvania
- Independence Park, Port Vila, a cricket ground in Port Vila, Vanuatu
- Independence Park (São Paulo), a park in São Paulo, Brazil
- Independence Park (Shymkent), Kazakhstan
- Independence Park, South Korea, a park in Seoul, South Korea
- Independence Park (Tel Aviv) is a public park in Tel Aviv, Israel
- Independence Park (Jerusalem) is a public park in Jerusalem, Israel
