= Independence Park (Shymkent) =

Urban park in Shymkent, Kazakhstan

- Тәуелсіздік саябағы
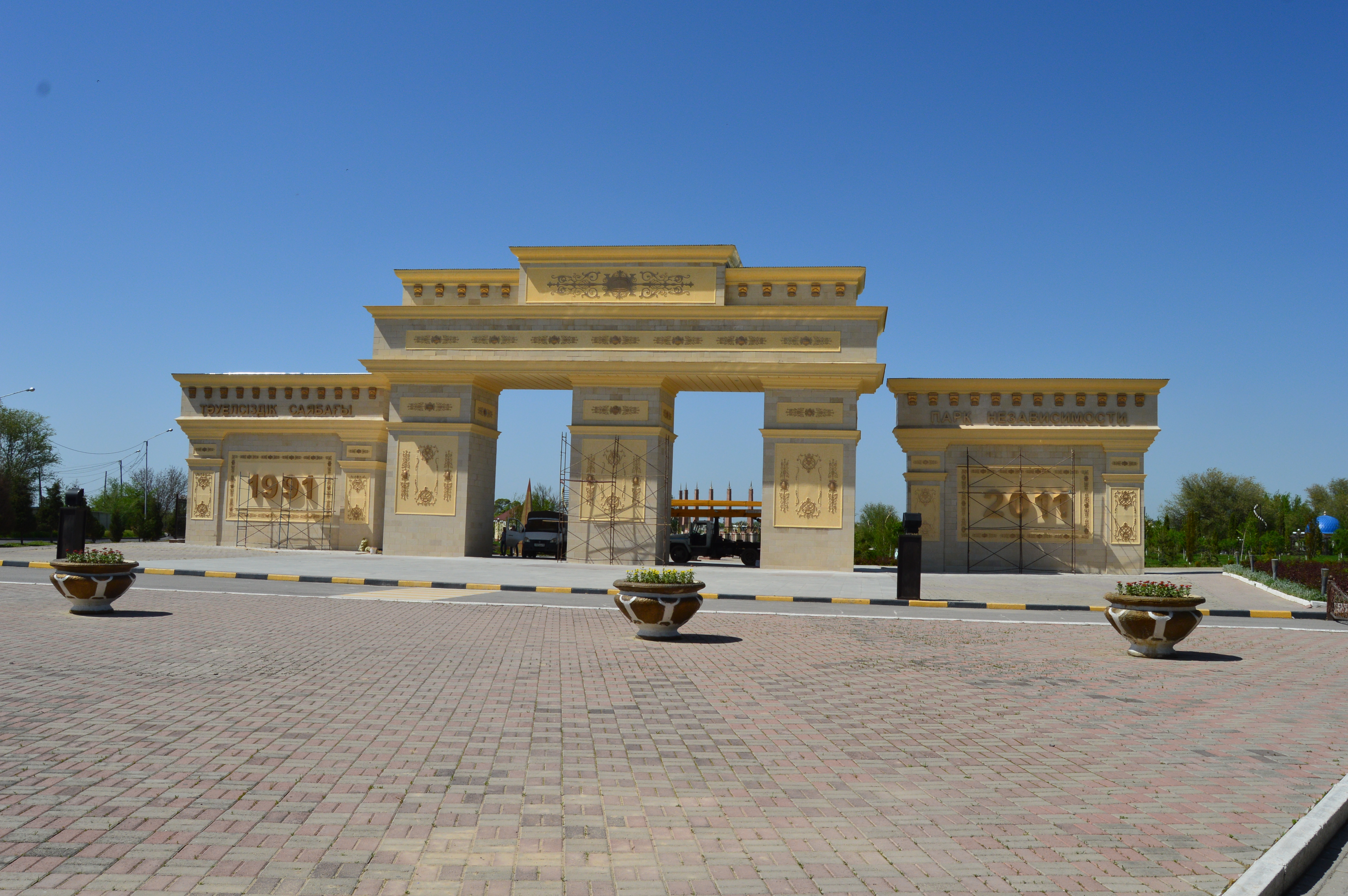
- Interactive map of Independence Park
- Location: Shymkent, Kazakhstan
- Coordinates: 42°18′24″N 69°36′00″E
- Area: 0.0082 hectares (0.020 acres)
- Opened: October 2011

The Independence Park (Kazakh: Тәуелсіздік саябағы, Täuelsızdık saiabağy) is an urban park in the city of Shymkent, Kazakhstan. It was opened in October 2011 as an honor to the 20th anniversary of Independence Day. The central entrance to the park is decorated with an arch and inside the territory, is a singing fountain, numerous flower arrangements, plants for which were brought from the Netherlands. In the center, there's monument named Altyn Shanyraq which represents the unity of Kazakhstani people which was created from 137 metal elements symbolizing 137 nationalities living on the territory of the Republic of Kazakhstan. A large flag pole is installed in the park with a height of 50 meters. A large iron pedestrian bridge connects the park to the Ordabassy Square, symbolizing the transition from the historical past of the city to its modern history.
