= Shymkent =

City in Kazakhstan

Shymkent Şymkent Шымкент
- City of republican significance
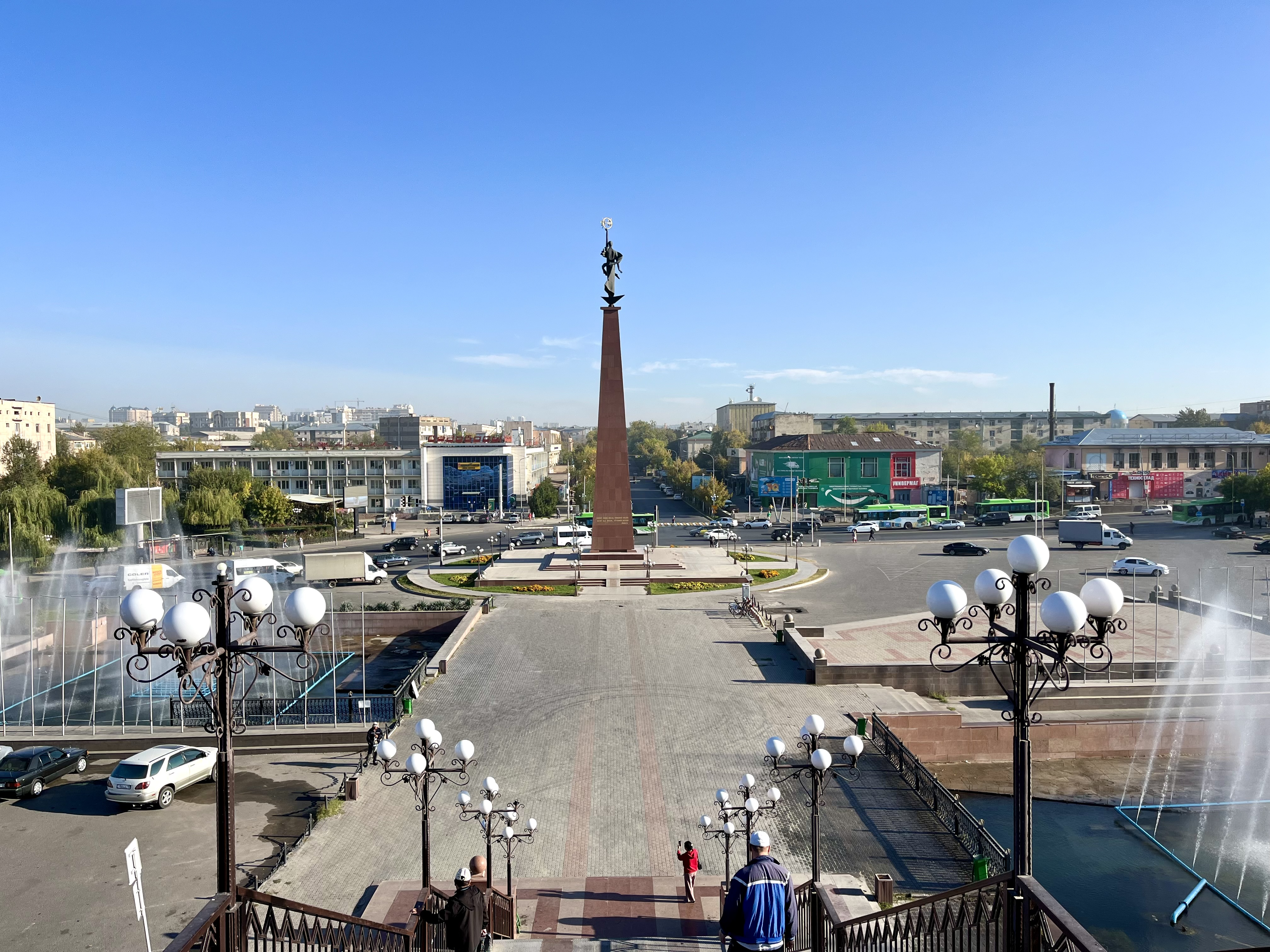
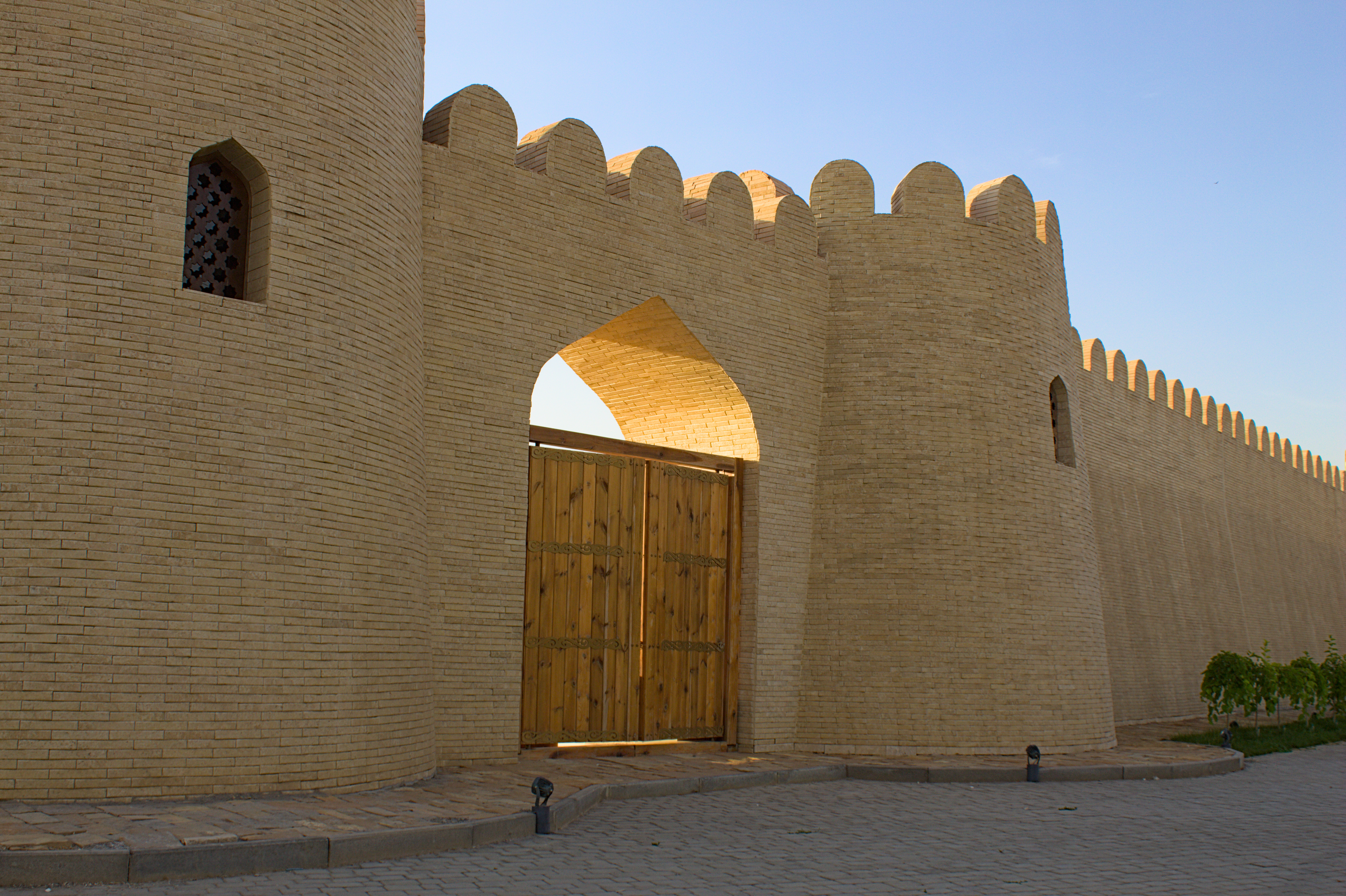
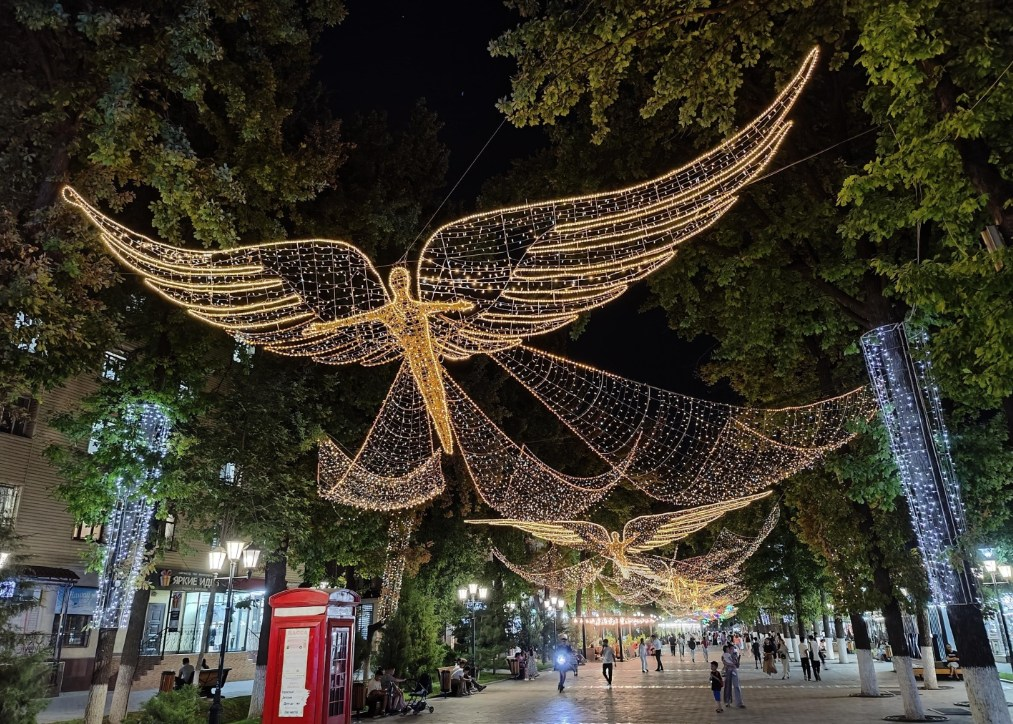
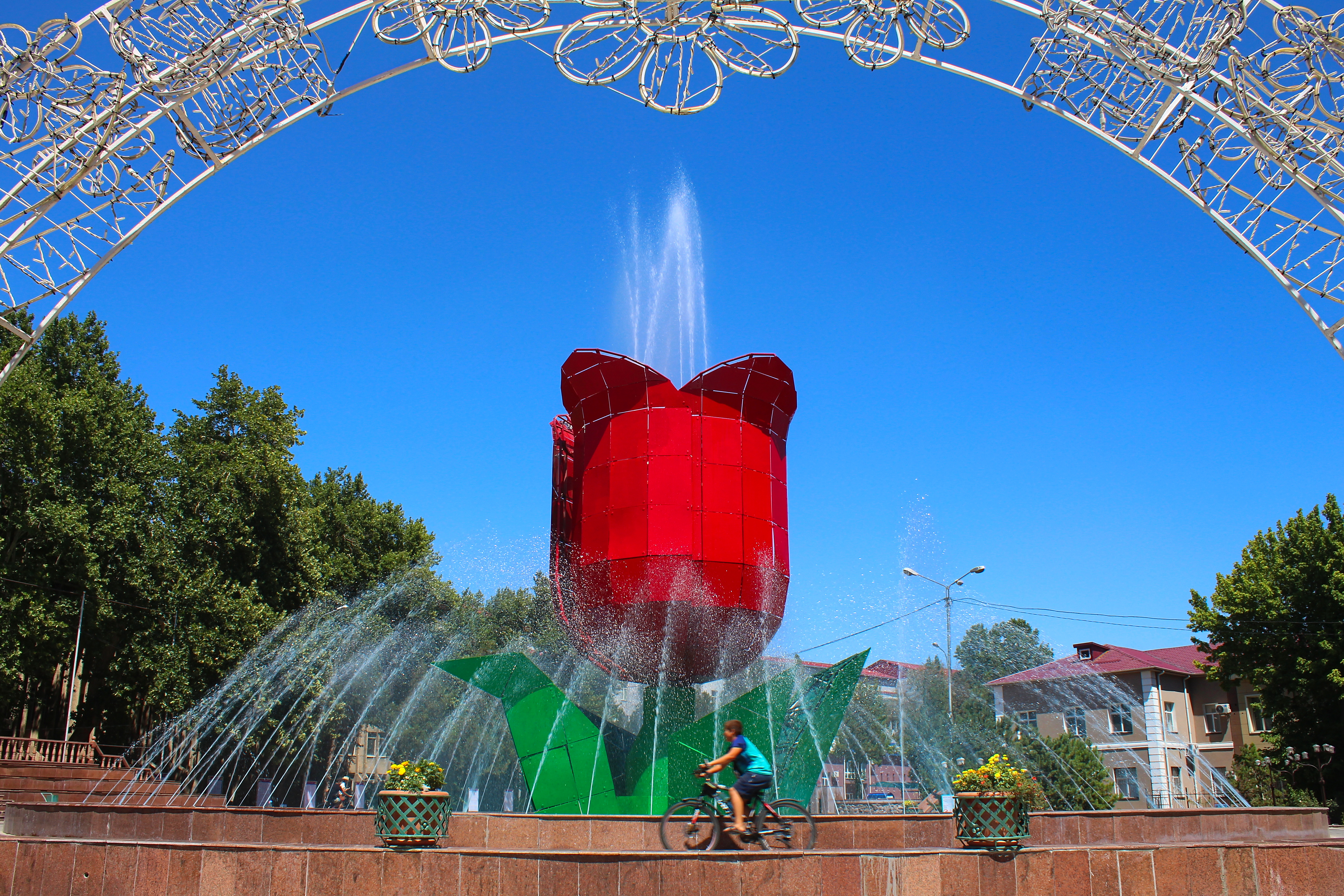
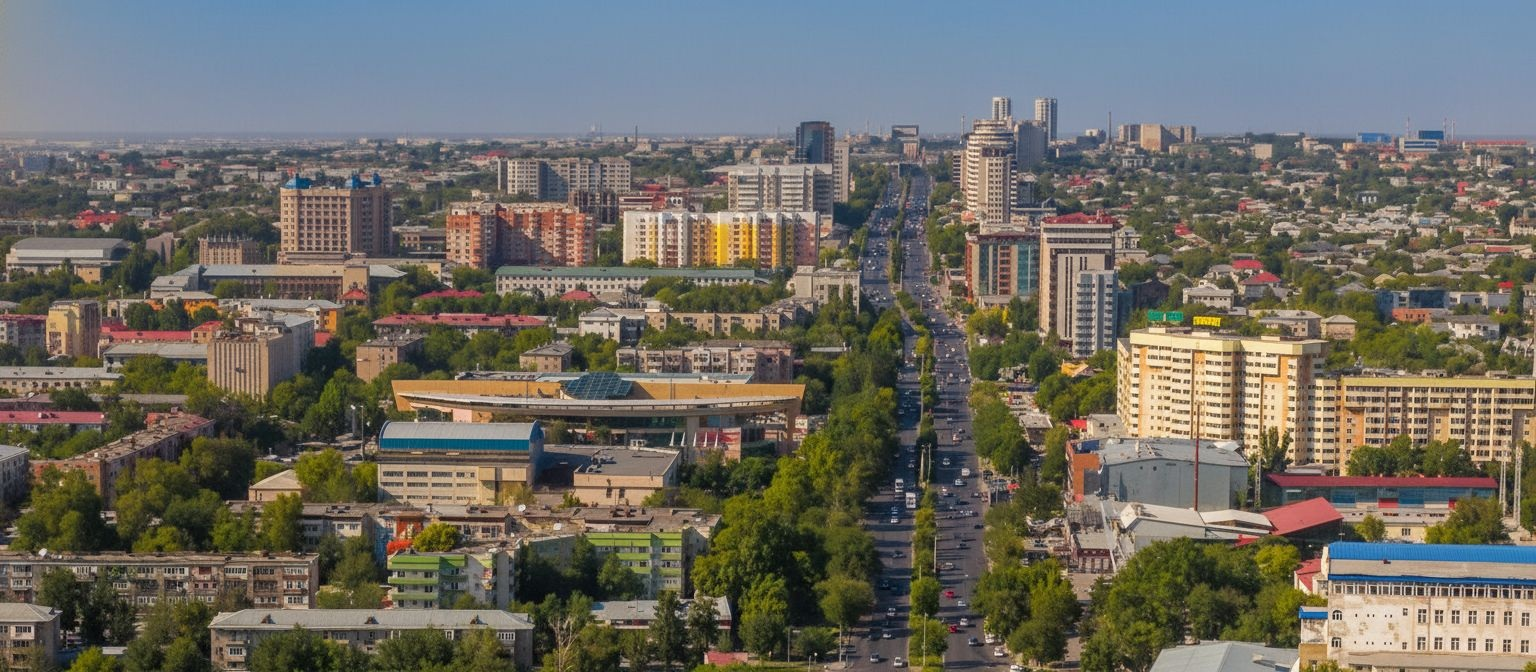
- Ordabassy Square Old Citadel Arbat Tulip fountain Downtown Shymkent

- Flag Logo

- Location in Kazakhstan
- Coordinates: 42°19′0″N 69°35′45″E
- Country: Kazakhstan
- Founded: 3rd-2nd century BC

Government
  - Body: City Mäslihat
  - Akim: Gabit Syzdykbekov

Area
  - Total: 1,170 km^{2} (450 sq mi)
- Elevation: 506 m (1,660 ft)

Population (1 June 2025)
  - Total: 1,274,296
  - Rank: 3rd in Kazakhstan
  - Density: 1,090/km^{2} (2,820/sq mi)

GDP (Nominal, 2024)
  - Total: KZT 4,408 billion (US$ 9.256 billion) · 13th
  - Per capita: KZT 3,557,000 (US$ 7,470)
- Time zone: UTC+5 (UTC+5)
- Postal code: 160000
- Area code: (+7) 7252
- ISO 3166 code: SHY
- Vehicle registration: 17
- HDI (2019): 0.795 very high · 6th
- Climate: Dsa / Csa
- Website: shymkent.gov.kz/en

Shymkent (Note: English: /ʃɪmˈkɛnt/ shim-KENT; Kazakh: Шымкент, romanized: Şymkent, pronounced [ʃəmkʰʲéntʰ]; Kyrgyz: Чымкент, romanized: Chymkent, pronounced [tɕʰɯmkʰéntʰ]; Uzbek: Чимкент, romanized: Chimkent, pronounced [tʃʰɪmˈkʰentʰ]; Russian: Шымкент [ʂɨmˈkʲent] or Чимкент [tɕɪmˈkʲent]) is a city in southern Kazakhstan, close to the border with Uzbekistan. Shymkent is the third-largest city in Kazakhstan, and serves as a regional cultural and economic center. Administratively, it is one of three cities of republican significance in Kazakhstan, the others being Almaty and Astana. Geographically, Shymkent lies approximately 690 kilometres (430 mi) west of Almaty, 1,483 kilometres (921 mi) south of Astana, and 120 kilometres (75 mi) north of Tashkent, Uzbekistan. Historically, Shymkent dates back to at least the twelfth century, although some archeological finds date back to over 2000 BCE, and it sat along the caravan route of the Silk Road, connecting Central Asia to China, and now functions as a major railway junction for the region. The city also hosts Shymkent International Airport, which connects to various domestic and international destinations.

Shymkent is home to several major historic and cultural sites, and, as of 2024, was one of the top tourist destinations in Kazakhstan. Shymkent hosts several universities and cultural institutions. Ethnically, the city has sizable Uzbek and Russian communities alongside its majority Kazakh population, reflecting its proximity to Uzbekistan and Soviet past.

== Etymology ==
The name Chimkent comes from the Turkic word chim, meaning "turf", and the Sogdian word kent (or kand), meaning "city" (also found in the name of nearby Toshkent); thus, it literally means "the city in the grass/turf." After Kazakhstan gained independence, the spelling was changed to Shymkent in 1993 as part of the government's campaign to apply Kazakh names to cities.

== History ==
Chimkent was founded in the twelfth century as a caravanserai to protect a nearby Silk Road trade town, Sayram, 10 kilometres (6.2 mi) to the east. Chimkent grew as a market center for trade between Turkic nomads and the settled Sogdians. It was destroyed several times: by the Mongols led by Genghis Khan, by soldiers from the southern Khanates, and by nomad attacks. In the early 19th century, it became part of the khanate of Kokand before it was captured by the Russians in 1864. It was renamed Chernyaev in 1914 and renamed Chimkent in 1924. Following the Russian conquest, Chimkent was a city of trade between nomadic Turks and sedentary Turks, and was famous for its kumis. Chimkent was founded as a hub for economic development in South Kazakhstan in the 20th century, and rapid growth was evolving in the second half of the century. To date, there are about 70 factories, plants and other manufacturing companies in the area. A settlement on the territory of modern Chimkent already existed at the turn of the 11th – 12th centuries and it belonged to Uzbeks. At the same time, there is a hypothesis about its earlier establishment based on the burials found during archaeological excavations that, according to experts, date back to the 5th – 6th centuries. In the sources that have reached our time, the Central Asian historian Sharaf ad-din Yazdi (1425) first mentioned Chimkent in the book Zafar Name (Book of Victories), when describing the military campaigns of Timur. Chimkent (Shymkent), as a city-settlement already existed in the 6th century AD. Its name links to the famous traveler Xuan Jiang, who mentioned it in his notes about Isfijab - Sairam. It is widely believed that the city existed in the 12th century. This information is taken from the book of A. Dobrosmyslov "Cities of the Syr-Darya region", where he reports the following: "The name of the city of Chimkent comes from the words chim - sod and kent - city. Indigenous people of Chimkent relate the time of its establishment to the 12th century, referring to the grave of St. Baba Dervish, a contemporary of Khoja Ahmet Yasawi."

In 1914, in honour of the 50th anniversary of Chimkent becoming part of the Russian Empire, the city was named Chernyaev, but in 1924 the Soviet authorities returned to the city its former name. A lead plant was built in Chimkent in the 1930s. It accounted for 70% of the total lead produced in the Soviet Union. An oil and fat plant, a hosiery and a mirror factory were commissioned. In 1932, an agricultural aviation base was created, which led to the creation and development of the city airport. During the Second World War, a number of Soviet industrial enterprises were evacuated in Chimkent. From the front line, 17 plants and factories were relocated here. The city produced spare parts for tanks, shells, metal, lead for bullets, optical instruments and other products. Seven Chimkent residents were awarded the title of the Hero of the Soviet Union. There was a gulag near Chimkent, and as a result, many Russian-speaking people came to the area through imprisonment in that gulag. During World War II, in connection with the formation of the Polish Anders' Army, a Polish diplomatic post was established in the city in January 1942, however it was closed in July 1942 when the Soviets arrested four of its staff members (all of whom were released in October 1942).

In January 2015, Shymkent officials sent a request to UNESCO to be recognized as an ancient city.

Until 2018, Shymkent was the administrative center of South Kazakhstan Region. On 19 June 2018 it was taken out of South Kazakhstan Region and subordinated directly to the government of Kazakhstan. As a result, the administrative center of the region is moved to Turkistan, and the region was renamed as Turkistan Region.

== Geography ==
=== Climate ===
Shymkent features a humid continental climate (Köppen Dsa) bordering on a mediterranean climate (Csa). Shymkent features hot, dry summers and cold winters. Winters here are noticeably warmer than in more northerly cities like Almaty and Astana, with the mean monthly temperature during the city's coldest month (January) averaging around −0.4 °C (31.3 °F). Winter snowfalls are common, although rainfall during that season occurs mixed in with that. Shymkent averages just over 600 millimetres (23.62 in) of precipitation annually.

Climate data for Shymkent (1991–2020, extremes 1939–present)
Month	Jan	Feb	Mar	Apr	May	Jun	Jul	Aug	Sep	Oct	Nov	Dec	Year
Record high °C (°F)	22.2 (72.0)	25.5 (77.9)	31.5 (88.7)	35.6 (96.1)	38.2 (100.8)	41.0 (105.8)	45.2 (113.4)	42.2 (108.0)	38.8 (101.8)	36.6 (97.9)	30.5 (86.9)	25.7 (78.3)	45.2 (113.4)
Mean daily maximum °C (°F)	5.2 (41.4)	7.2 (45.0)	14.1 (57.4)	20.5 (68.9)	26.0 (78.8)	31.5 (88.7)	34.1 (93.4)	33.4 (92.1)	28.0 (82.4)	20.3 (68.5)	12.3 (54.1)	6.6 (43.9)	19.9 (67.9)
Daily mean °C (°F)	−0.4 (31.3)	1.3 (34.3)	7.8 (46.0)	14.0 (57.2)	19.3 (66.7)	24.4 (75.9)	26.8 (80.2)	25.8 (78.4)	20.2 (68.4)	13.0 (55.4)	6.1 (43.0)	1.1 (34.0)	13.3 (55.9)
Mean daily minimum °C (°F)	−4.8 (23.4)	−3.4 (25.9)	2.7 (36.9)	8.2 (46.8)	12.6 (54.7)	16.7 (62.1)	18.6 (65.5)	17.6 (63.7)	12.6 (54.7)	6.8 (44.2)	1.3 (34.3)	−3.3 (26.1)	7.1 (44.9)
Record low °C (°F)	−27.4 (−17.3)	−30.3 (−22.5)	−19.0 (−2.2)	−9.6 (14.7)	−4.0 (24.8)	4.7 (40.5)	8.7 (47.7)	4.4 (39.9)	−1.8 (28.8)	−11.8 (10.8)	−25.8 (−14.4)	−27.3 (−17.1)	−30.3 (−22.5)
Average precipitation mm (inches)	77.5 (3.05)	90.2 (3.55)	81.1 (3.19)	73.6 (2.90)	56.3 (2.22)	23.6 (0.93)	9.9 (0.39)	3.5 (0.14)	8.9 (0.35)	38.7 (1.52)	74.1 (2.92)	76.8 (3.02)	614.2 (24.18)
Average precipitation days (≥ 1.0 mm)	9.9	10.1	9.1	8.6	6.8	3.9	1.8	1.0	1.4	4.2	7.4	8.9	73.1
Average rainy days	5	7	9	9	9	5	4	3	3	6	6	6	72
Average snowy days	8	7	4	0.3	0	0	0	0	0	0.4	3	6	29
Average relative humidity (%)	75	73	67	63	56	44	39	34	39	55	69	75	57
Average dew point °C (°F)	−4.2 (24.4)	−2.6 (27.3)	2.6 (36.7)	7.4 (45.3)	10.5 (50.9)	10.8 (51.4)	10.7 (51.3)	9.4 (48.9)	5.5 (41.9)	3.1 (37.6)	0.5 (32.9)	−3.6 (25.5)	4.2 (39.5)
Mean monthly sunshine hours	120.0	138.6	199.3	255.3	301.6	331.0	340.6	331.1	278.1	204.7	127.2	107.0	2,734.5
Source 1: Pogoda.ru.net
Source 2: NOAA NCEI, Weather.Directory

ГОСУДАРСТВЕННЫЙ КЛИМАТИЧЕСКИЙ КАДАСТР

=== Vegetation ===
The vegetation of the city is known for its extreme diversity. Trees like oak, elm, poplar, karagach, cannan maple, willow, chestnut, acacia, ailanthus, thuja, pine, spruce grow in the city. Farm horticultural аpple trees, mulberry, crops cherry, apricot, dried apricot, peaches and nectarines, plum, pomegranate, walnut, quince, and grape varieties are widespread, strawberry, and a wide variety of watermelons and melons. A rich variety of tomatoes, peppers and other vegetable crops.

== Demographics ==
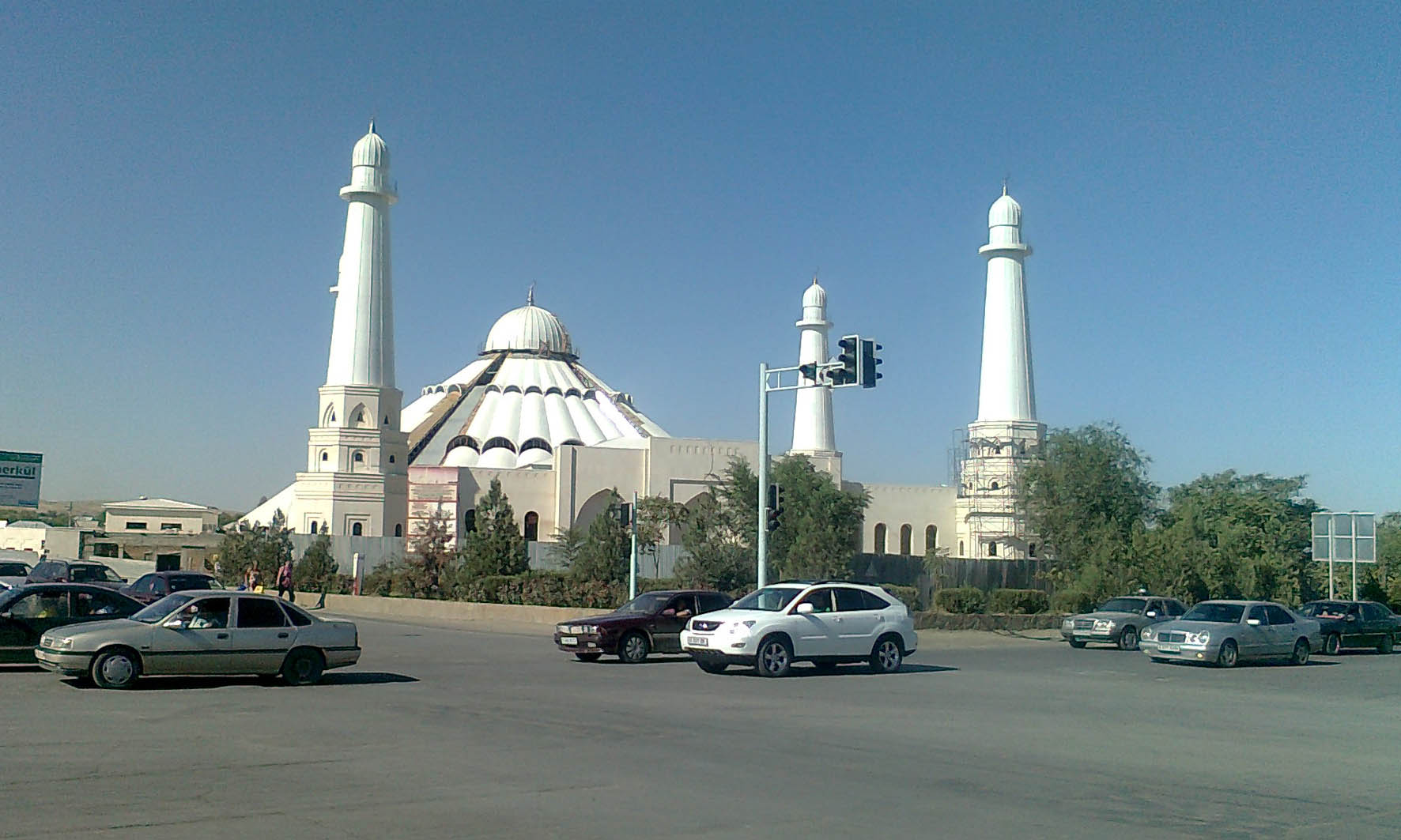
Islam is the most widely practiced religion in Shymkent

According to a government estimate in 2012, the city had 669,326 inhabitants. In 2009, the population of Shymkent was 603,499 (2009 census results); in 1999, it was 423,902 (1999 census results). By the beginning of 2015, Shymkent was joined by the areas of adjacent districts. In this connection, the city population has increased up to 858,147 people within the new boundaries by the beginning of 2015. By that time, 711,783 people resided in the former area of Shymkent. According to regional and city officials, the millionth resident of Shymkent was born on 17 May 2018. By 1 June 2018, the population of Shymkent was 1,002,291.

The following tables are the total population of Shymkent since 1897:

Historical population

Year	Pop.	±%
1897	11,194	—
1908	17,000	+51.9%
1913	19,000	+11.8%
1939	74,000	+289.5%
1959	153,000	+106.8%
1970	247,000	+61.4%
1977	303,000	+22.7%
1979	321,535	+6.1%
1989	392,977	+22.2%
1992	405,500	+3.2%
1993	409,700	+1.0%
1994	411,400	+0.4%
1995	414,400	+0.7%

Year	Pop.	±%
1996	417,900	+0.8%
1997	417,400	−0.1%
1998	419,700	+0.6%
1999	435,300	+3.7%
2000	482,900	+10.9%
2001	502,700	+4.1%
2002	506,700	+0.8%
2003	513,100	+1.3%
2004	521,200	+1.6%
2005	526,100	+0.9%
2006	535,100	+1.7%
2007	554,600	+3.6%
2008	602,300	+8.6%

Year	Pop.	±%
2009	615,000	+2.1%
2010	629,100	+2.3%
2011	642,600	+2.1%
2012	662,300	+3.1%
2013	683,300	+3.2%
2015	858,147	+25.6%
2016	885,799	+3.2%
2017	932,234	+5.2%
2018	1,002,291	+7.5%
2019	1,023,618	+2.1%
2020	1,056,309	+3.2%

Ethnic groups (2020):

- Kazakh: 67.47%
- Uzbek: 17.69%
- Russian: 8.91%
- Azerbaijani: 1.74%
- Tatar: 1.01%
- Others: 3.18%

== Region and development ==
On 19 June 2018 by the decree of the President of Kazakhstan, Shymkent was recognized as one of Kazakhstan's cities with a population of over a million people, along with the capital, Astana, and Almaty. Shymkent was given the status of a city of republican significance. It was removed from the South Kazakhstan region, which was renamed Turkestan by the same decree. The city of Shymkent became an independent administrative-territorial unit, and the 17th region in Kazakhstan.

In 2016, construction began on Shymkent City, a new district comprising residential and administrative areas, in the northern part of the city. This construction is part of then-President of Kazakhstan Nursultan Nazarbayev's promotion of the development of Shymkent as the "third Kazakhstani megalopolis".

== Economy ==
Shymkent is a major economic center within Kazakhstan. Major industries in Shymkent include metallurgy, mechanical engineering, chemicals, petroleum refining, and the food industry. Industrial production increased by 15% compared to 2018. Agricultural production increased by 6.3%, housing construction by 19.2%, retail trade by 7.1%. In the last 3 years, as part of the Industrial and Innovative Development Programme, 24 enterprises were opened in Shymkent, and 1,300 permanent jobs were created. There are 2 industrial zones in the city. To date investments worth 64 billion tenge have been attracted, 72 projects have been launched, more than 4,000 people have been employed. In February 2021, it was announced that authorities in Shymkent are planning for 123 investment projects worth over 1.36 trillion tenge (US$3.3 billion) to be launched over the next 5 years. These projects are expected to create approximately 11,500 jobs for the region.

=== Metallurgy ===
Formerly dominated by lead mining, industrial growth began in the 1930s. A lead smelter was opened in Shymkent in 1934 or 1938. It supplied a major part of the USSR's metals needs, copper as well as lead and others, including three-quarters of all bullets fired by the Red Army. Smelting continued until 2008, causing extreme levels of pollution (lead, cadmium, etc.) in the surrounding ground, and then controversially restarted in 2010, briefly, under a major UK-listed company, Kazakhmys. Lead smelting continued until 2012, with the closure of Yuzhpolymetal JSC. The city also has industries producing refined zinc. A 2026 study found that the resulting slag from lead and zinc production in Shymkent ranked "among the most severely contaminated metallurgical legacy sites documented in Central Asia and globally".

=== Petroleum ===
Shymkent Oil Refinery, one of Kazakhstan's three largest oil refineries, is located in Shymkent. The refinery, which belongs to PetroKazakhstan, was built in 1985, making it the newest oil refinery in Kazakhstan, and the only one located in the southern part of the country.

=== Pharmaceuticals ===
The city's pharmaceutical industry dates back to 1882, when two merchants founded an enterprise which used Artemisia cina to make santonin. During the time of the Soviet Union, the SANTO plant that evolved from this business became a major national producer of pharmaceutical substances and narcotic agents. The business was reorganized as Chimpharm JSC in 1993, and merged into Polpharma Group in 2011.

=== Other industry ===
Other industries in Shymkent include textiles, foodstuffs, and pharmaceuticals. Mechanical engineering is represented by Cardanval JSC (cardan shafts and crosspieces for cars and tractors), Yuzhmash JSC (forging and pressing machines, spare parts and equipment), Elektroapparat LLP (power switches and other products). As for light industry, enterprises include "Voskhod" (garments from woolen and semi-woolen fabrics: suits, coats, jackets, etc.), "Adal" (textile), "Elastic" (socks from high-quality yarn). Construction materials are produced by "Shymkentcement" and "Kurylys materialdary" JSC (bricks).

=== Tourism ===
Shymkent ranks among Kazakhstan's top tourist destinations, and local firms provide tourist services centered around historic sites, local flora and fauna, and nearby mountains.

=== Agriculture ===
Major crops grown in the area of Shymkent include maize, leguminous vegetables, rice, fodder crops, oilseeds, melons, root crops, and tubers. Common livestock in the area include cattle, sheep, horses, poultry, and pigs. The city also products processed karakul pelts. "Shymkentmai" JSC and "Kainar" LLP (processing of cotton, sunflower, safflower, soybean, production of refined edible oil and other products), "Shymkentpivo" JSC (beer), "Visit" JSC (soft drinks), "Shymkentsut" JSC (dairy products) are also operating in the city.

== Culture ==
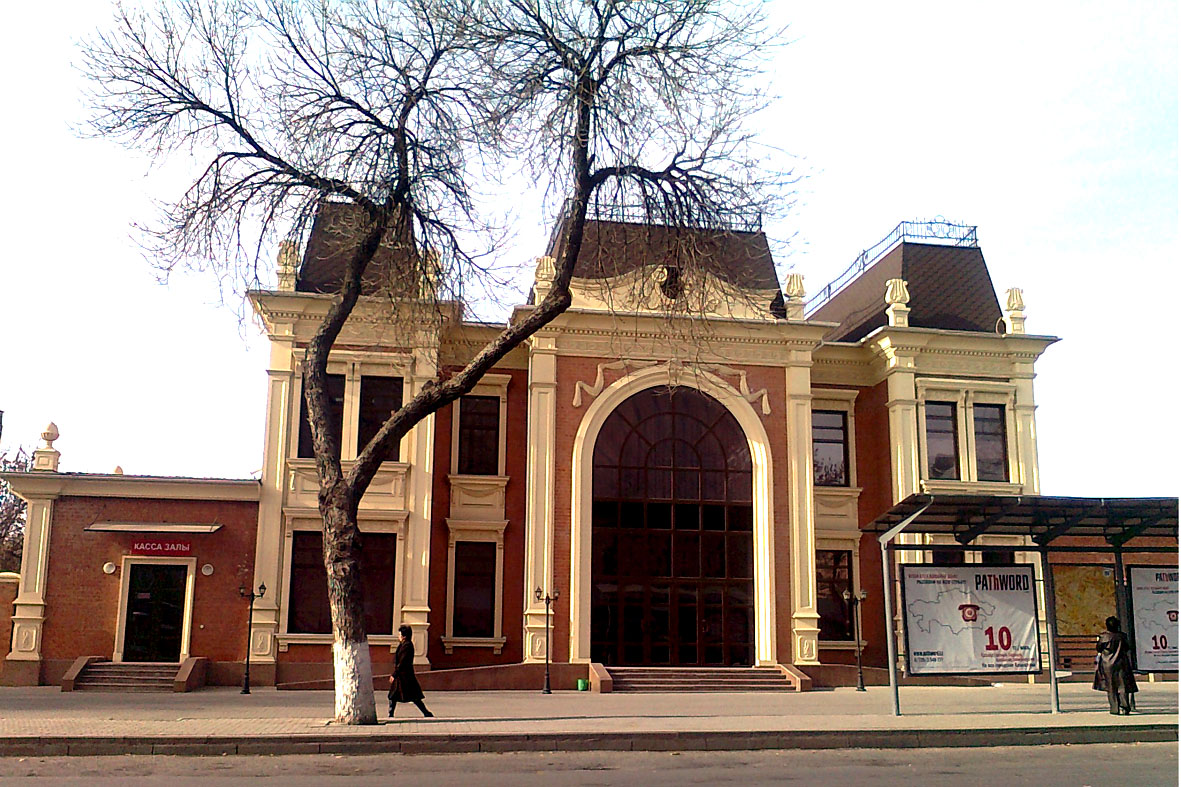
Shymkent Philharmonic

Shymkent has throughout its 2,200-year history been under many different cultural influences of its controlling civilizations. Shymkent served as the Cultural Capital of the Commonwealth of Independent States in 2020.

== Transportation ==
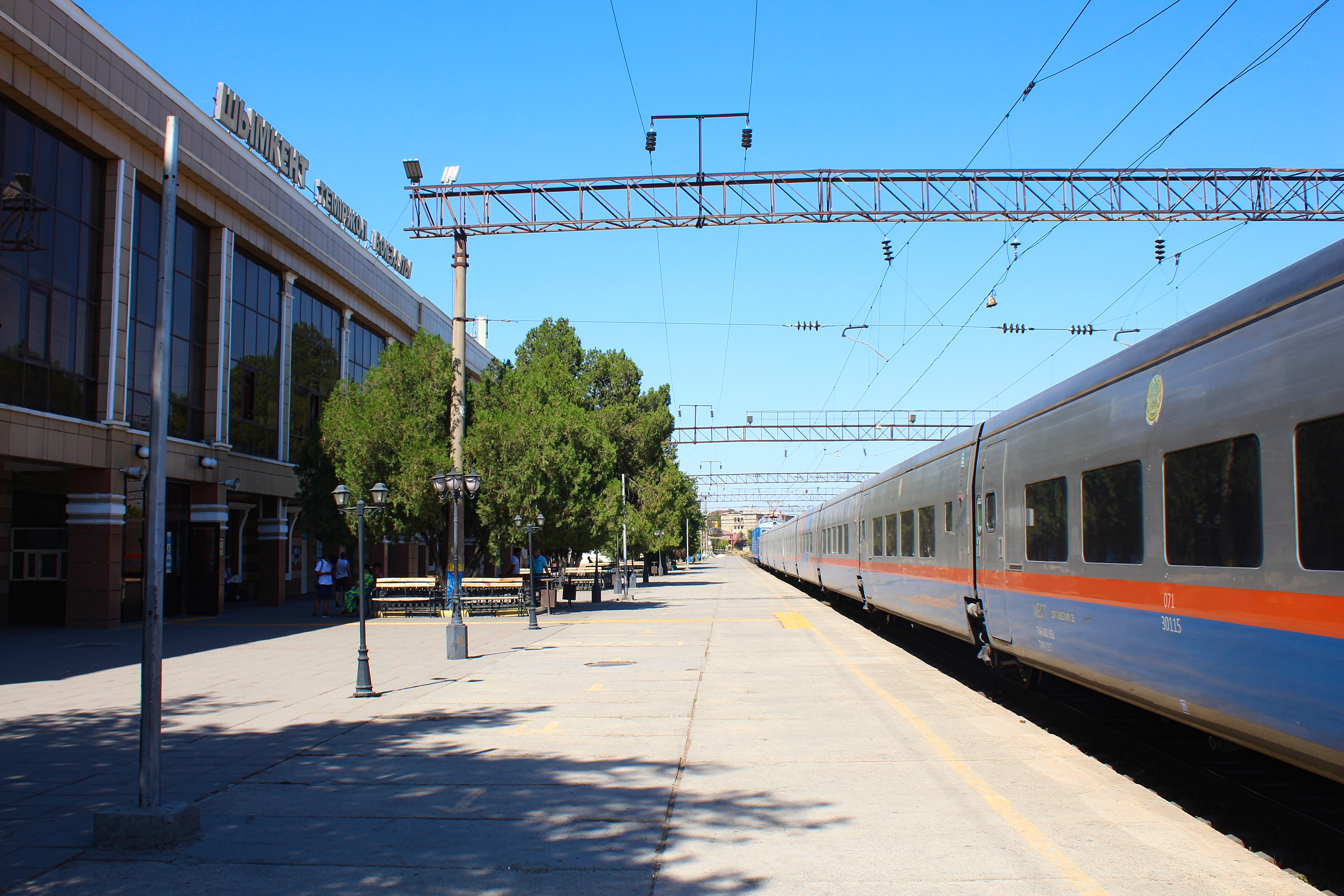
A Tulpar Talgo train in Shymkent station

=== Public transport ===
Shymkent serves as a major railroad junction, located alongside the Turkestan-Siberia Railway. The city is home to one passenger rail station, Shymkent station, which includes service to other major cities in Kazakhstan, including Almaty, Karaganda, Kokshetau, Petropavl, and Turkestan. All passenger trains are operated by Kazakhstan Temir Zholy. The express trains use Tulpar Talgo rolling stock. Bus services use modern Yutong CNG buses to reach close to every corner of the city and also decrease the air pollution of the region. At some parks and public places are also e-scooters are available for sharing.

=== Roads ===
As one of Kazakhstan's largest cities, Shymkent also has one of its most extensive road networks, with over 2,000 roads, and a total combined length of 2,810 kilometres (1,750 mi). Major roads passing through Shymkent include M32 (to Aktobe, Oral and Samara) and A2 (Tashkent and Almaty).

=== Airports ===
The Shymkent International Airport was opened in 1932 and is located 12 kilometres (7.5 mi) northwest of the city center. The airport offers air connections to all major cities in Kazakhstan as well as major international destinations like Dubai, Moscow and Istanbul, and international connections. Another small airfield is located near Sairam and is used mostly for sport and agriculture flights.

== Sightseeing ==
=== Streets ===
Before 1864, the city consisted of a chaotic interweaving of winding streets around the citadel of the ancient city of Shymkent (the so-called "Old City"). But after it became a town of the Syrdarya region in 1867, the "New City" gradually emerged - an area that has a rectangular-quarter street layout. It was limited to Nikolaevskaya (now Kazybek-bi), Stepnaya (Kunaev Boulevard), Sadovaya (Tauke Khan Avenue) and Meshchanskaya (now Turkestan) streets.

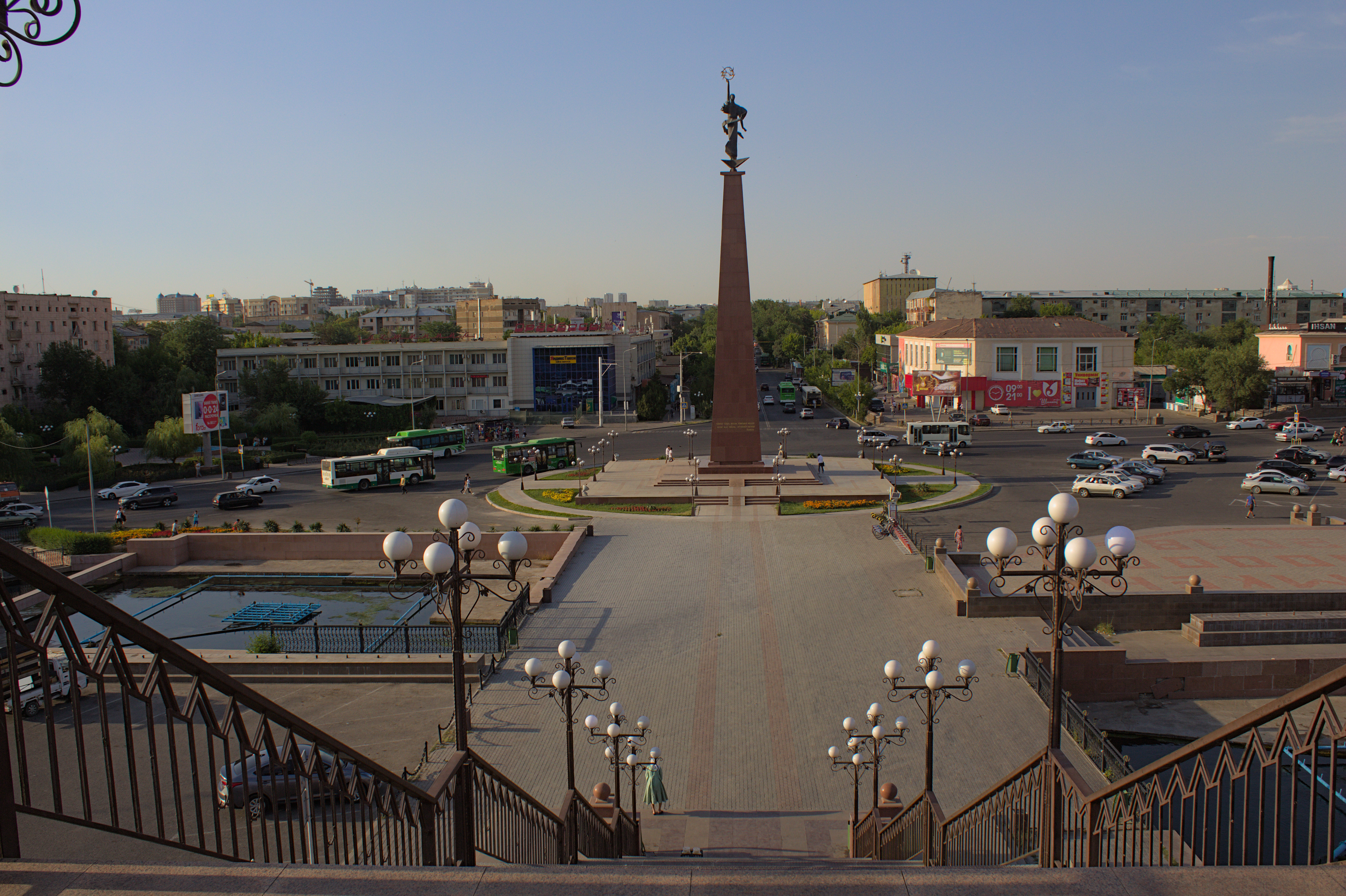
View of Ordabassy Square from the stairs to Independence Park

==== Ordabasy Square ====
In the 19th century, the eastern border of the city passed here, and there were also fortified gates leading to Sayram and Taraz. In those days, there was a bazaar nearby, therefore this square was called Bazaar; the street got the same name, which originated from this square.

Currently, three streets converge on the Ordabasy Square, named after three Kazakh historic figures: Tole Bi, Kazybek Bi, Aiteke Bi. The monument Zher-ana was erected right in the center of the square. It has three faces with a height of 34 meters. Famous quotes of the three wise Kazakh men are carved on each face of the monument. The top of the monument is crowned by the figure of a young woman, symbolizing Mother Earth, who releases seven swallows into the sky. Under the square flows the Koshkar Ata river and the square contains two fountains next to the monument. Ordabasy Square connects to Independence Park through a 104 metres (341 ft) long pedestrian bridge.

=== Parks ===
==== Ken Baba Park ====
This park (formerly the Cathedral Garden, Nikolsky Church Park, and Children's Park) is one of the oldest in the city, located on Kazybek Bi Street at the intersection with Tauke Khan Avenue. In 1908, St. Nicholas Cathedral was built in the area by the architect Matsevich, which opened in the autumn of 1914. This three-story building is considered one of the best examples of religious construction in the "red brick style." In the Soviet years, it was transformed into a regional library, and later into the Palace of Pioneers. Now it is the regional puppet theatre.

Valuable trees (mainly oaks) planted here in the late 19th and early 20th centuries and still grow in the park. Currently, there are numerous children's attractions and catering establishments. The water of the spring source is sent to artificial waterfalls that flow into decorative ponds, then the water is redistributed through the channels. Waterfowl and decorative fish can be spotted in the water.

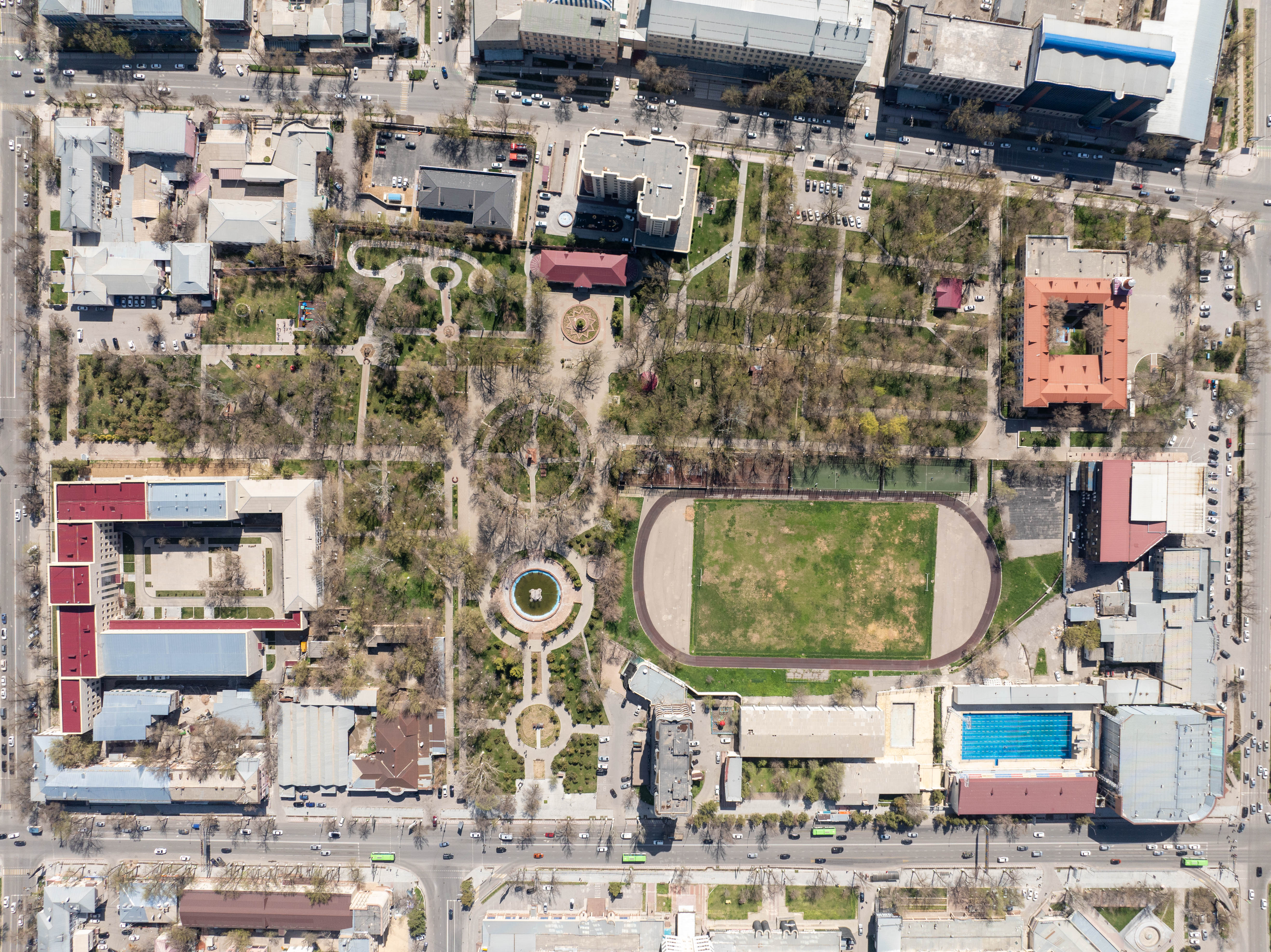
An aerial view of Central Park

==== Central Park ====
This park (formerly the Public City Garden) is also located on Kazybek Bi Street near Ken Baba Park. It was built at the end of the 19th century, almost simultaneously with the Cathedral Garden.

==== Dendropark ====
The Dendropark was built in 1980 at the outskirts of the city. Because of the fast growth of the city it is now inside of the city and located at the Prospekt Baydibek Bi. The park cover an area of 150 ha and there are about half of million trees and shrubs of 1,360 different types. Most of them are rare and exotic types from different regions of the world. In the center of the park is a huge pond where visitors can rent Pedalos or Rowing boats to discover the park by boat. The park additional offers a [Cycling|cycling] and running track, some small drink and food shops and a bike rental shop.

==== Abay Park ====
The Abay Park is named after the Kazakh poet Abay and is located in the heart of the city. A museum and a monument about Abay is located near the south entrance at the Zheltoqsan Street. In the center of the park is a huge World War II memorial with an eternal flame. An art gallery and a public swimming pool are located in the northern part of Abay Park.

Independence Park

Independence Park was created for the 20th anniversary of Kazakhstan's Independence in 2011. The park offers a Singing fountain, a 50 metres (160 ft) high flagpole, pavilions, playgrounds and the monument named Altyn Shanyraq. The park is located near the Citadel, the Ordabasy Square and the train station.

=== Landmarks ===
==== Koshkar Ata mosque ====
The Koshkar Ata mosque also known as Zhami Mosque was built in 1850–1856. It was erected by Ferghana masters in the style of quarterly mosques of frontal composition. Initially, the building was built of mud brick, but due to flooding by the river, it collapsed over time. Therefore, in 1891–1893 the mosque was rebuilt with burnt bricks. The main facade was made in the form of a three-arch structure, the building had a right and left wing. In 2009, the left wing was destroyed despite the fact that the mosque is protected by law as a monument of architecture.

==== Old city ====
The old city began to appear thanks to artisans and farmers who began to settle at the foot of the citadel of the ancient city of Shymkent in the 16th century.

Today, the streets of the Old City follow the outlines of the streets of past centuries. But only two architectural objects of the century before last have survived - the Koshkar Ata mosque and the house of the district chief. In the late period of the Soviet Union, a plan was created to preserve the Old City as an open-air museum with special requirements for newly erected buildings to combine the historical and modern architectural style. After the fall of the Soviet Union the plans were not realized.

== Education ==
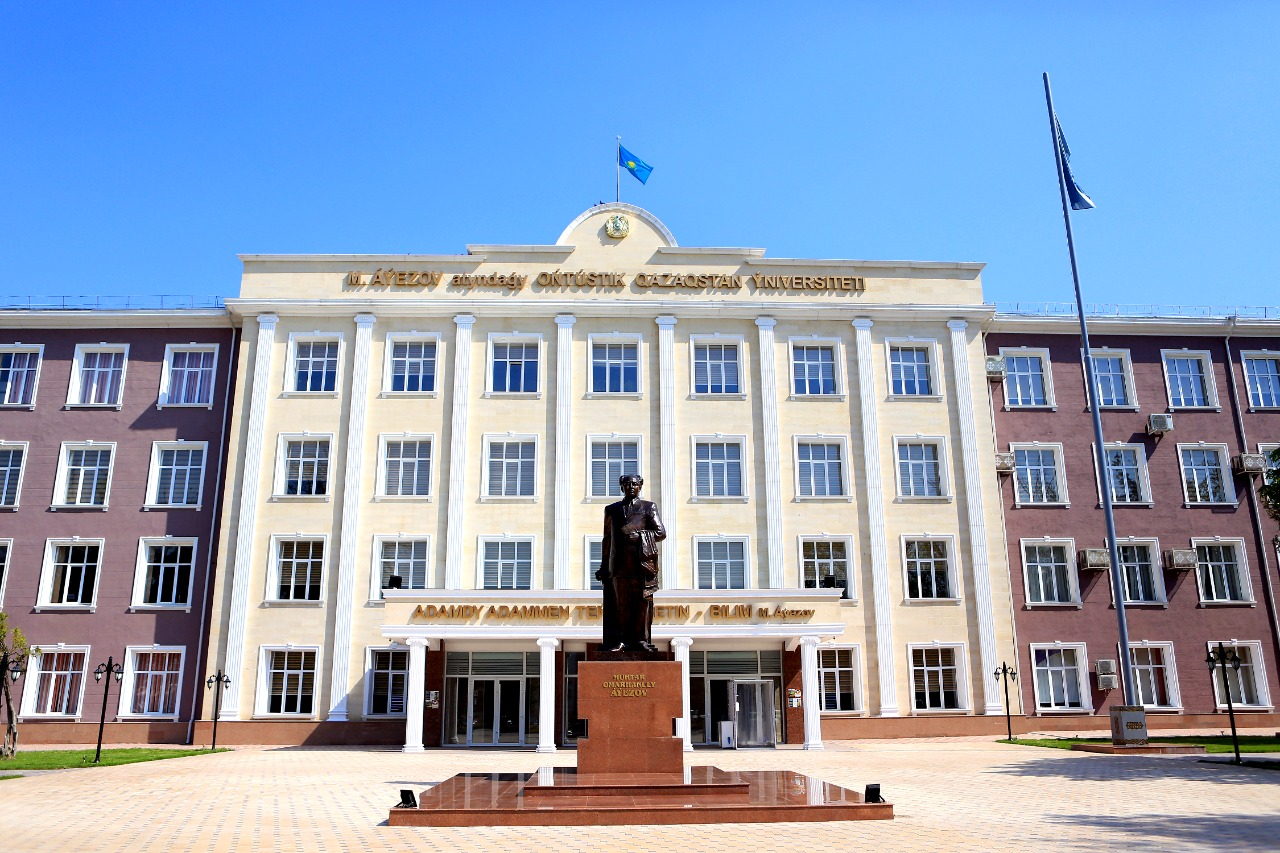
Auezov South Kazakhstan State University

There are 8 universities in Shymkent:

- Auezov South Kazakhstan State University
- South Kazakhstan Pedagogical University Zhanibekov University
- South Kazakhstan Medical Academy
- Shymkent University
- Central Asian Innovation University
- Tashenev University
- Peoples' Friendship University named after Academician A. Kuatbekov
- Miras University

== Sport ==
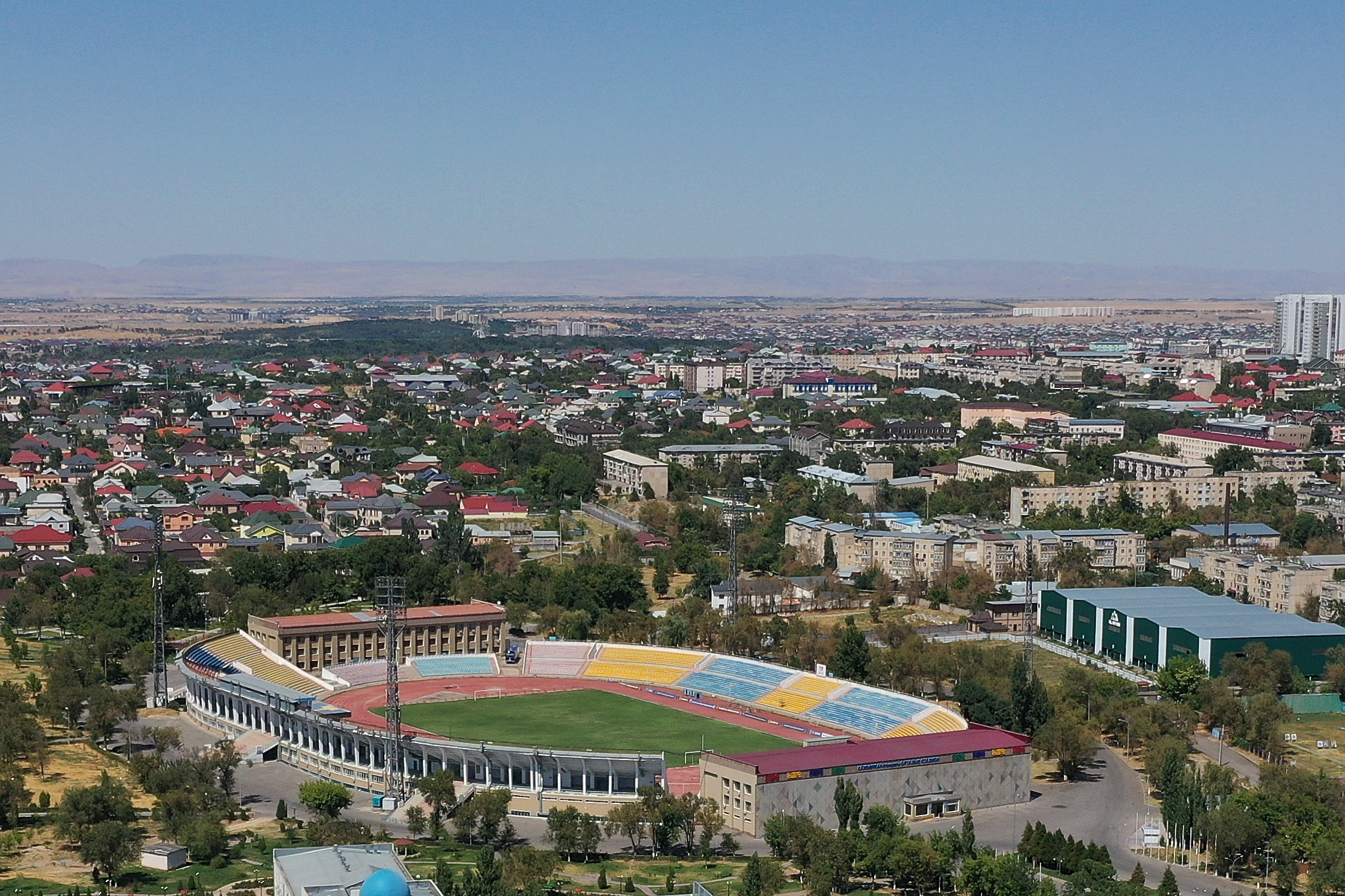
Kazhymukan Munaitpasov Stadium

- FC Ordabasy - Men's football team (Currently playing in Kazakhstan Premier League)
- BIIK Kazygurt - Women's football team

Kazhymukan Munaitpasov Stadium is the main stadium in the city. Its capacity is 20,000. It is the base of FC Ordabasy.

== Notable people ==
- Ahmed Agadi, a tenor opera singer
- Aliya Yussupova, a rhythmic gymnast
- Iordanis Pechlivanidis (born 1986), footballer

== Twin cities ==
Twin Cities is the name of the sister cities program.

City	Country	Year
Mogilev	Belarus	
Stevenage	United Kingdom	1990
Acharnes	Greece	
İzmir	Turkey	2004
Pattaya	Thailand	2017
Grosseto	Italy	
Baiyin	China	
Khujand	Tajikistan	
Eskişehir	Turkey	

== Gallery ==
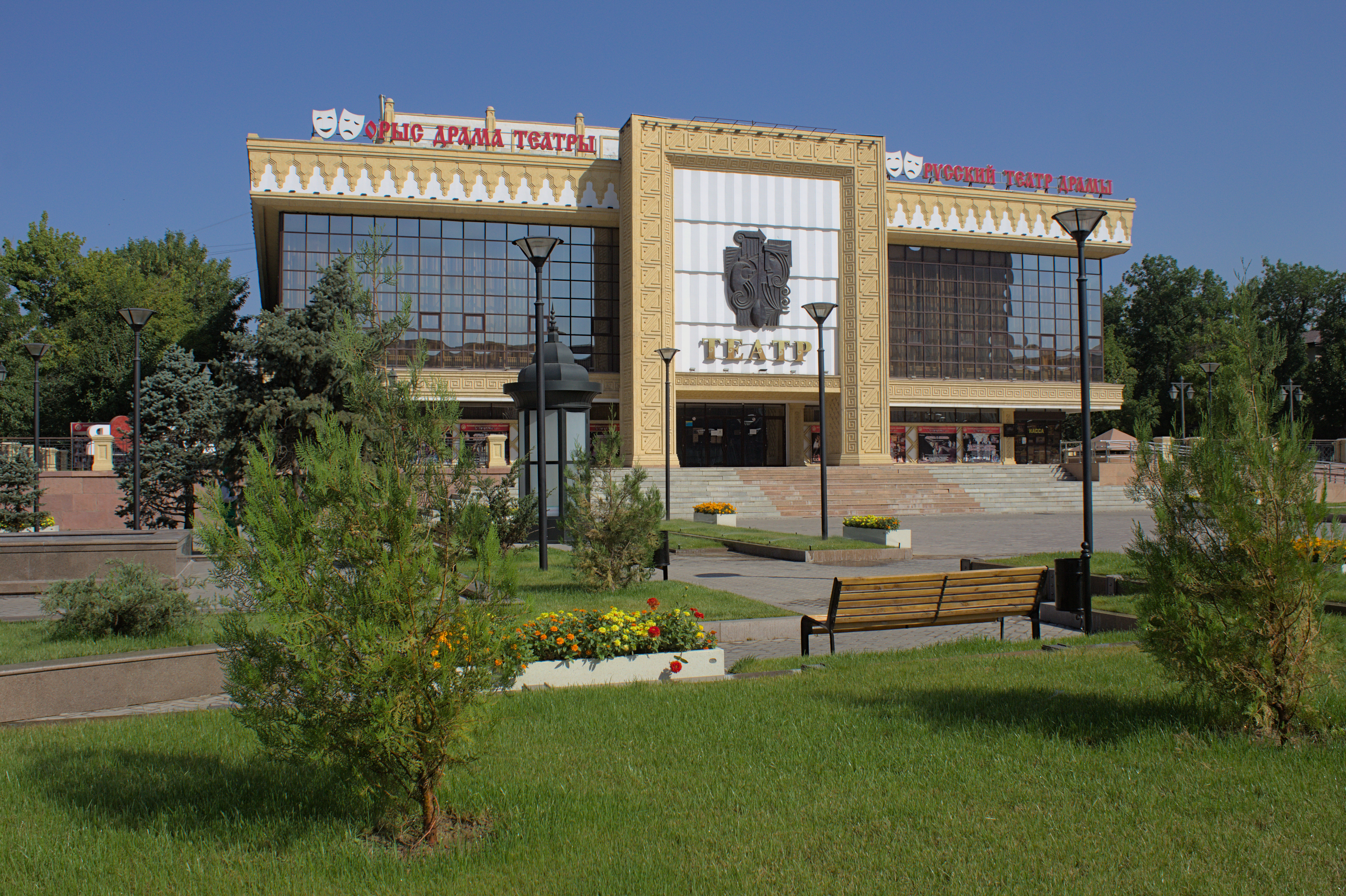
Russian Drama Theater at Al-Farabi Square

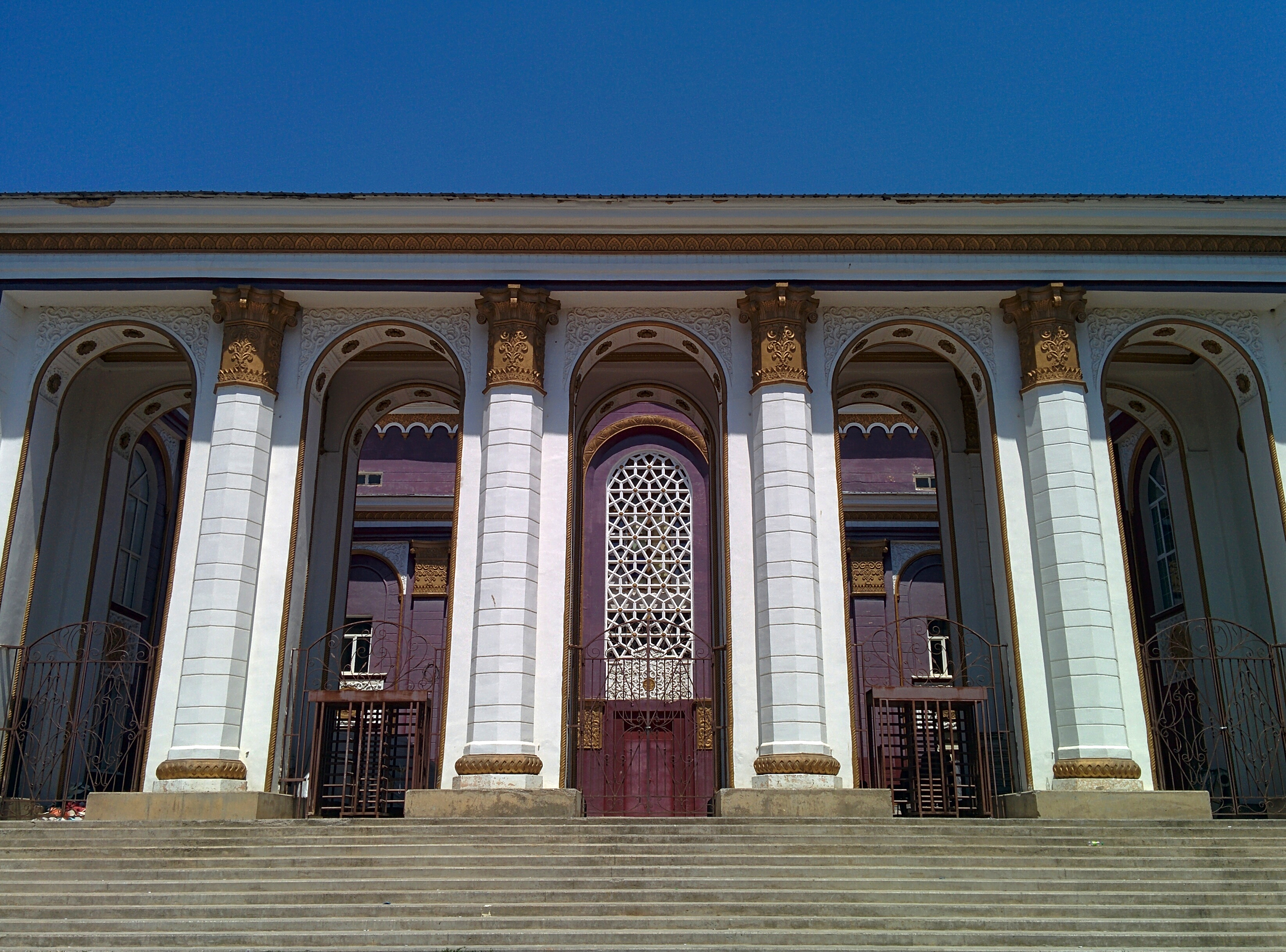
Palace of Metallurgists

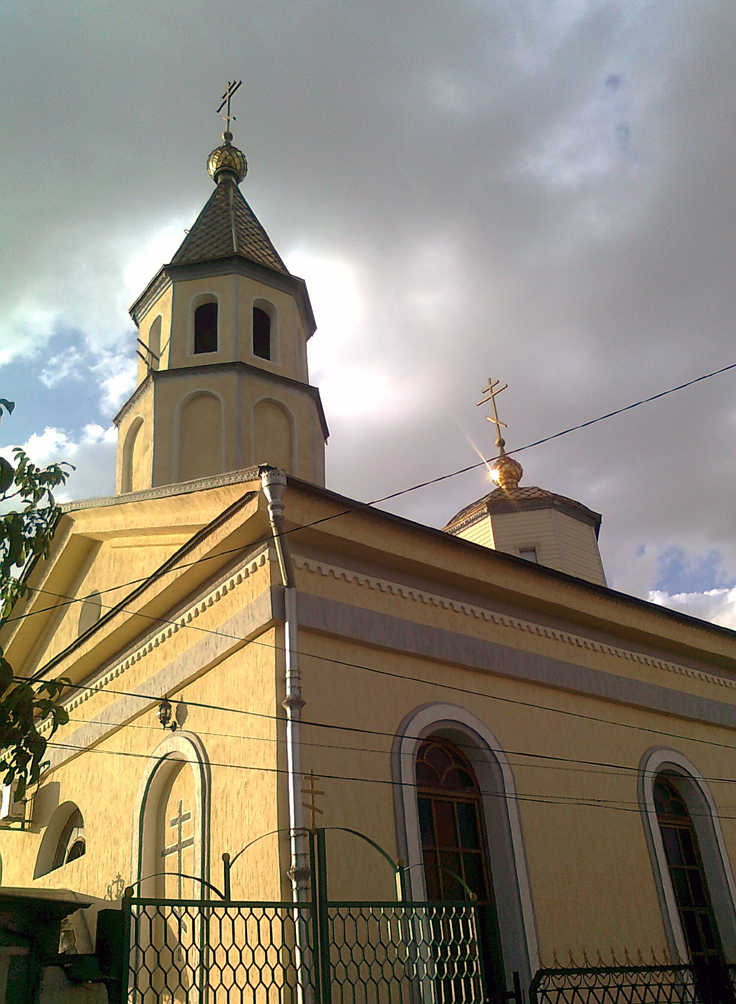
Temple of the Icon of Kazan Mother of God

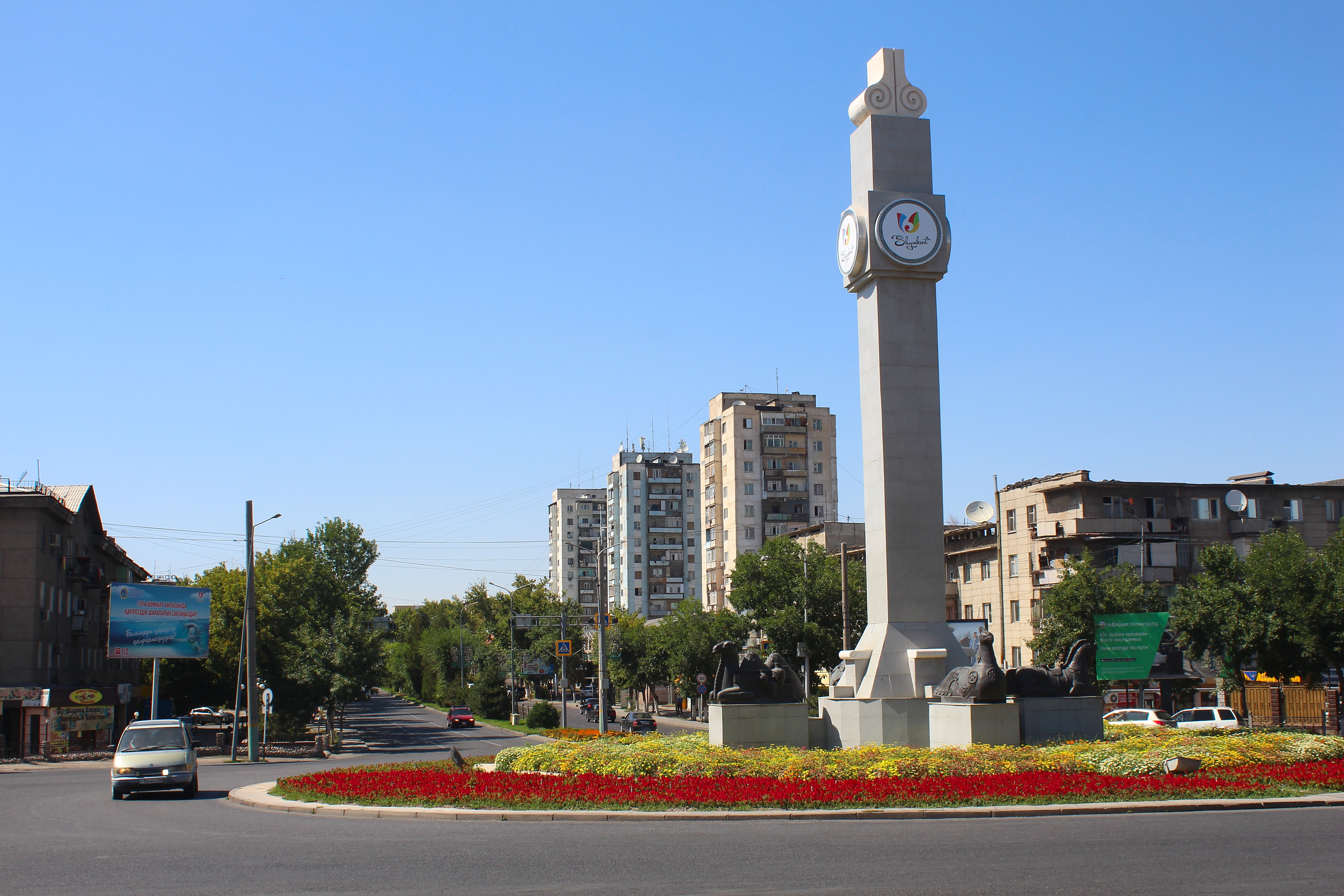
Train station forecourt

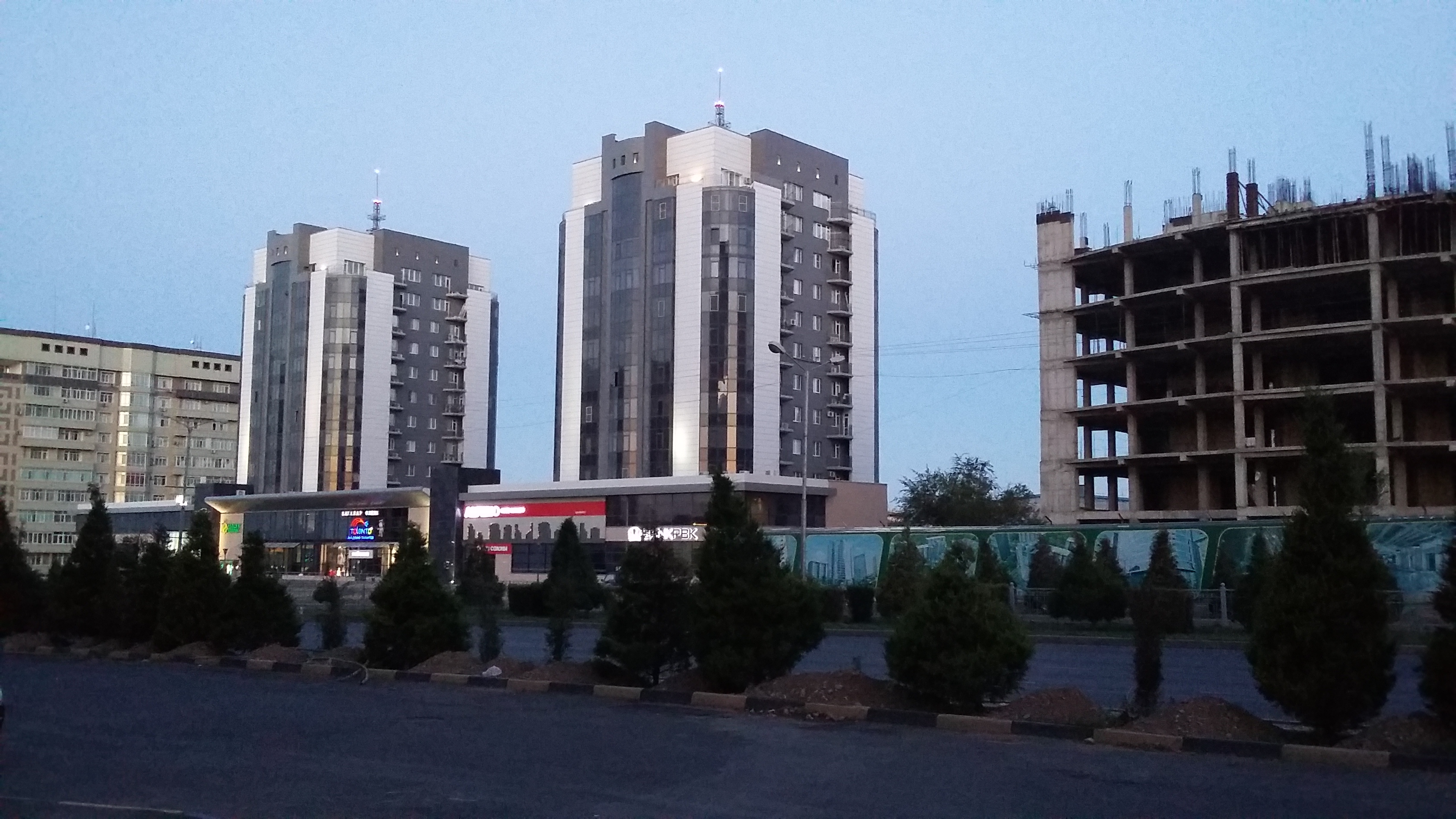
Residential buildings on Kunaev Boulevard

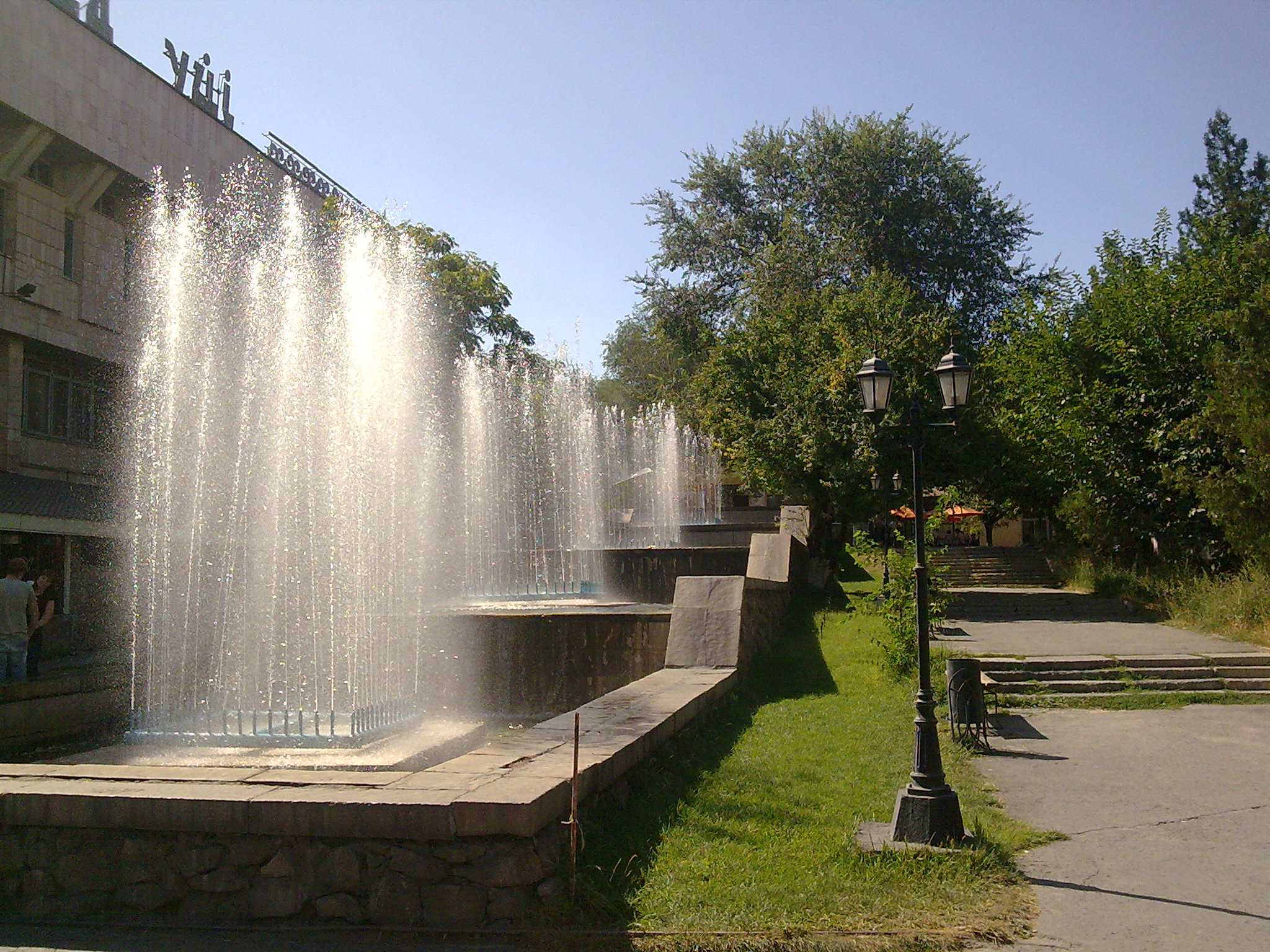
Fountains near the Central Department store (ЦУМ)

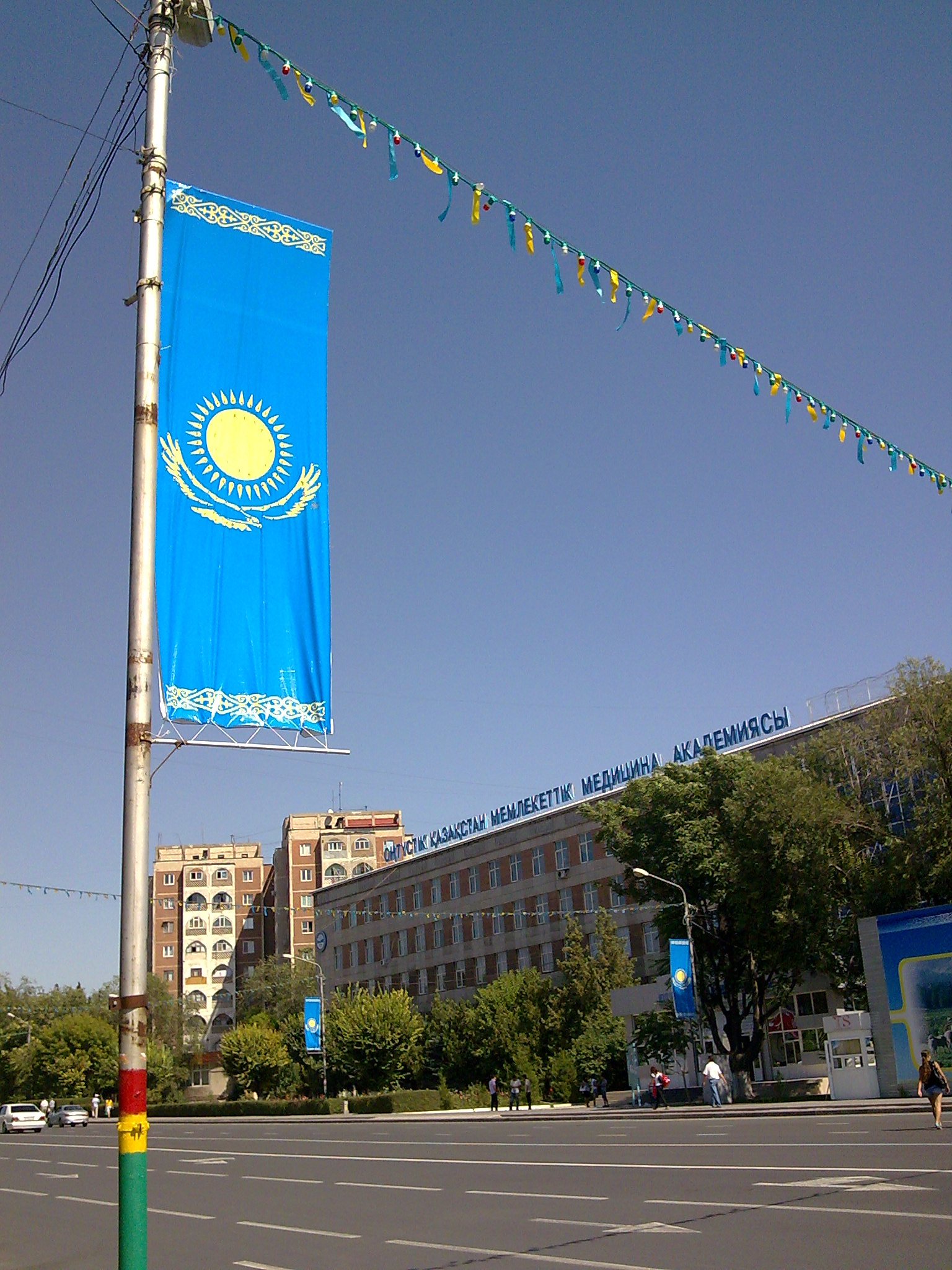
Al-Farabi st., the view of the local Medical Academy

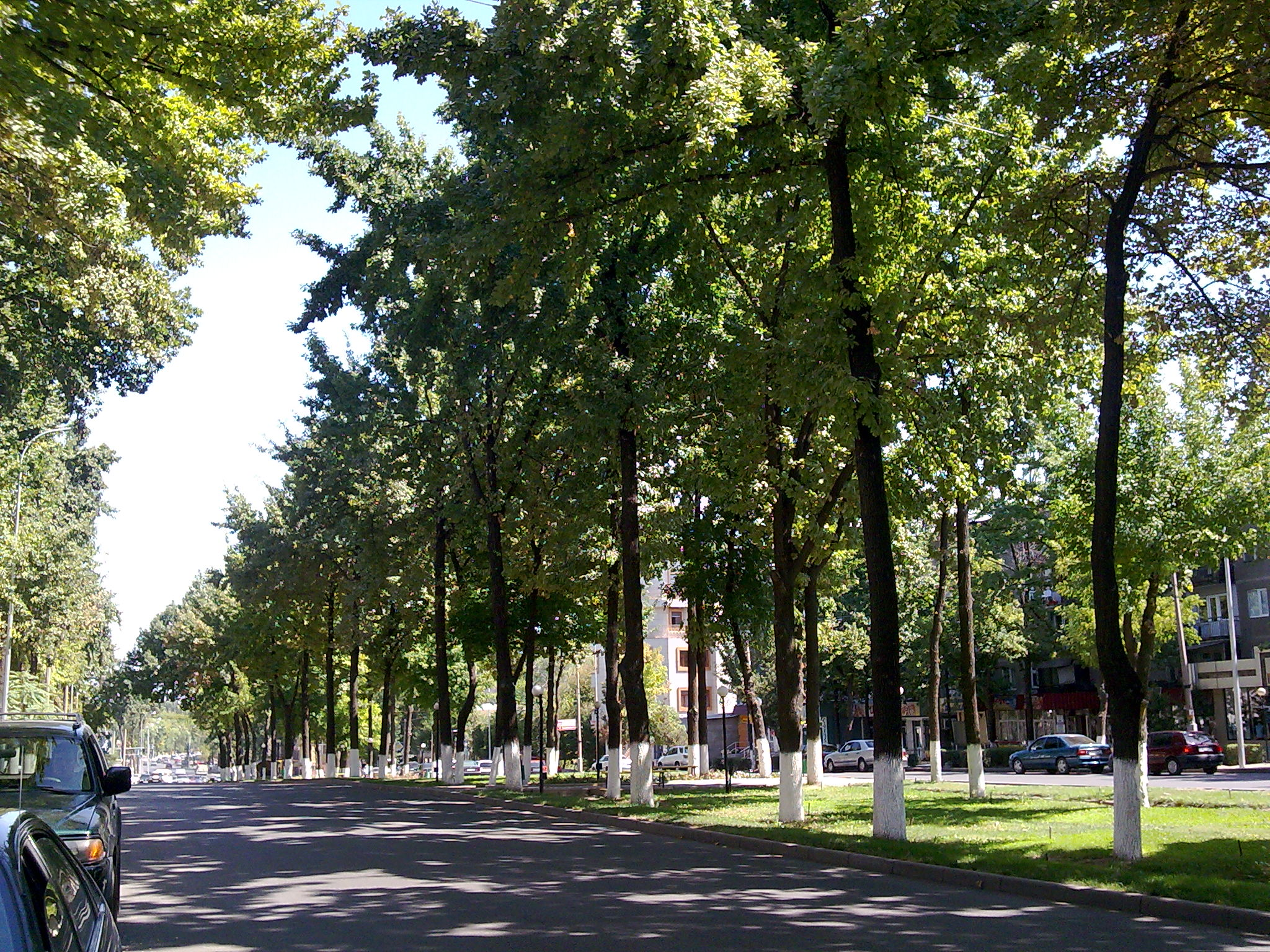
Turkestan st.

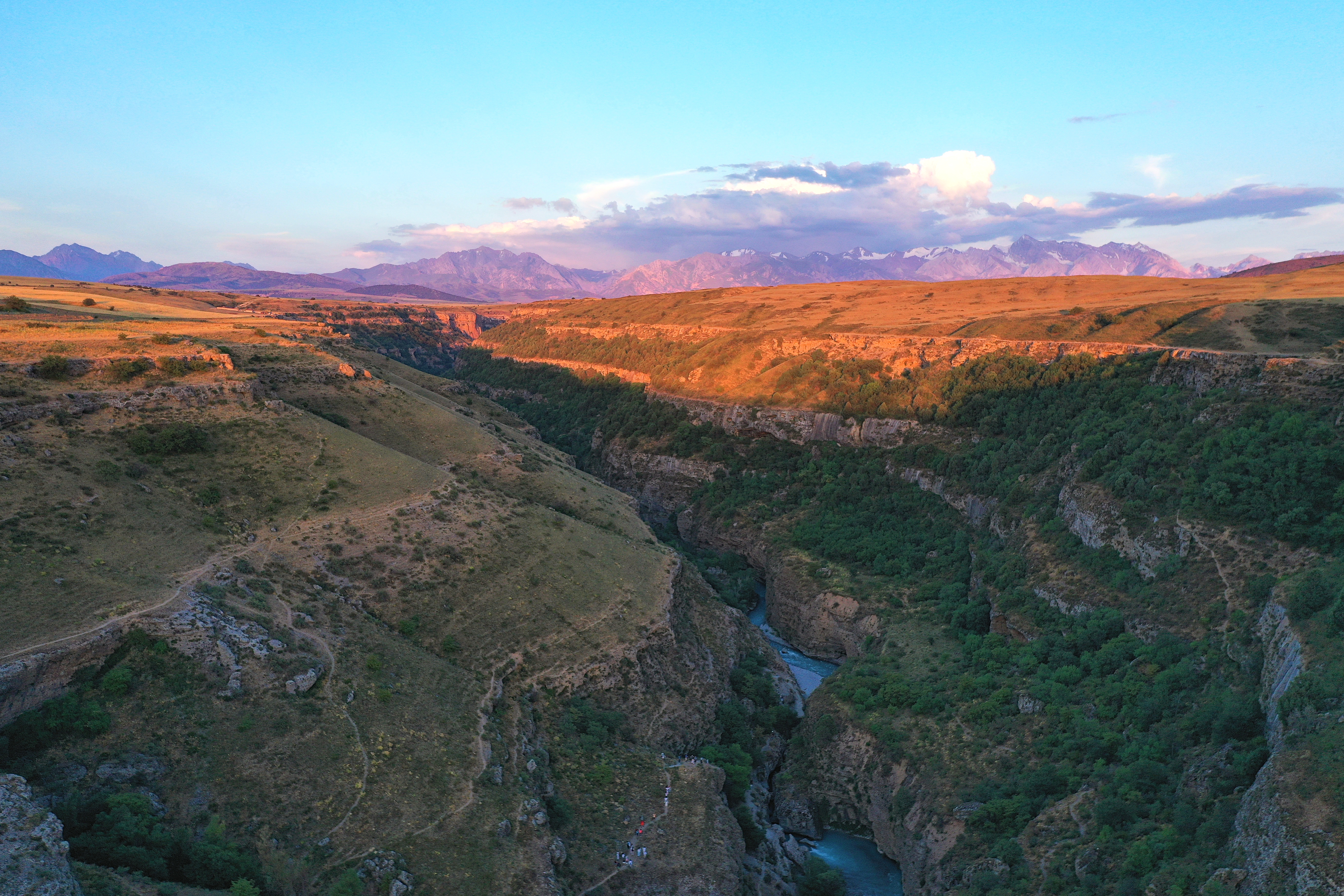
Aksu Canyon on the outskirts of Shymkent

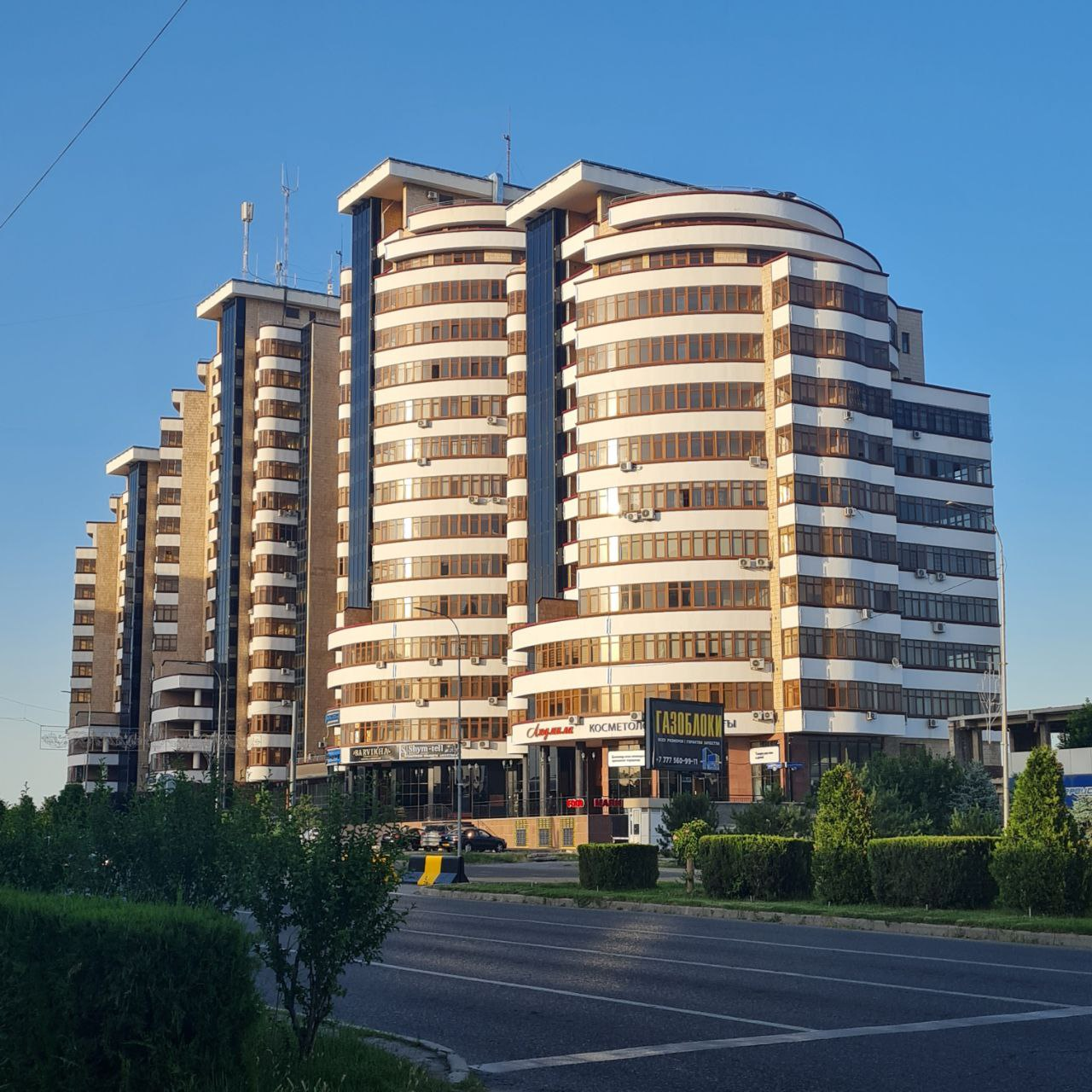
Residential complex «Kazakhstan» on Kunayev Boulevard

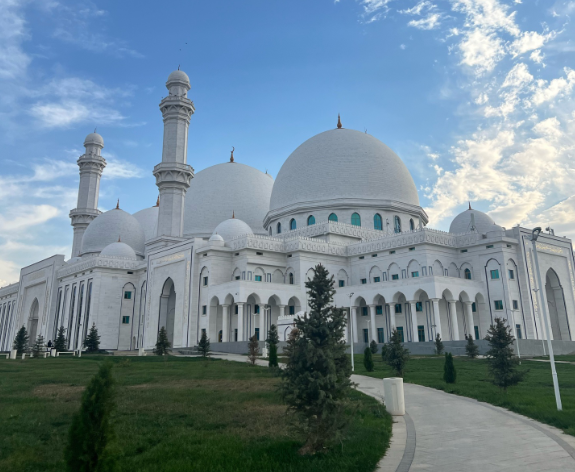
The Grand Mosque Named After Seyitjan Kari Eszhanuly

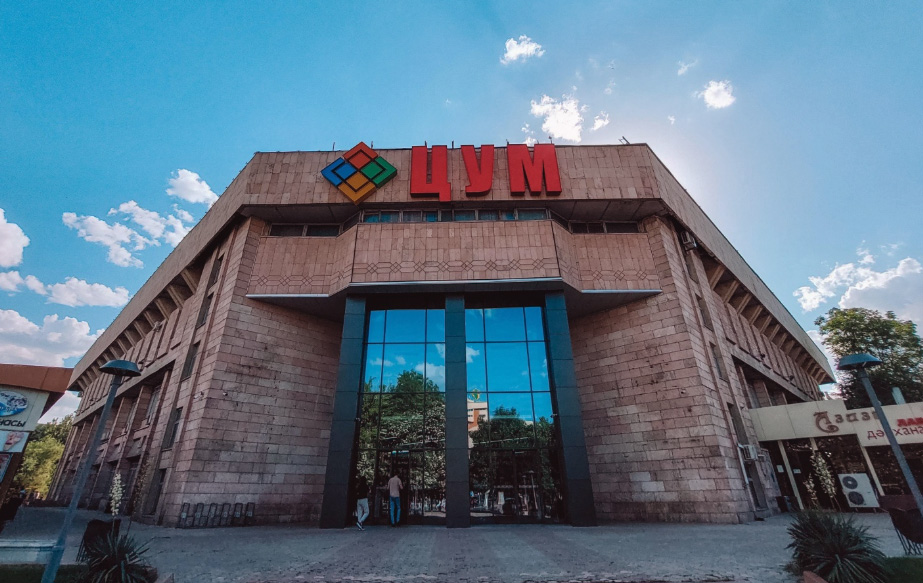
View on shopping mall in Shymkent, called ЦУМ in the Russian/Soviet style

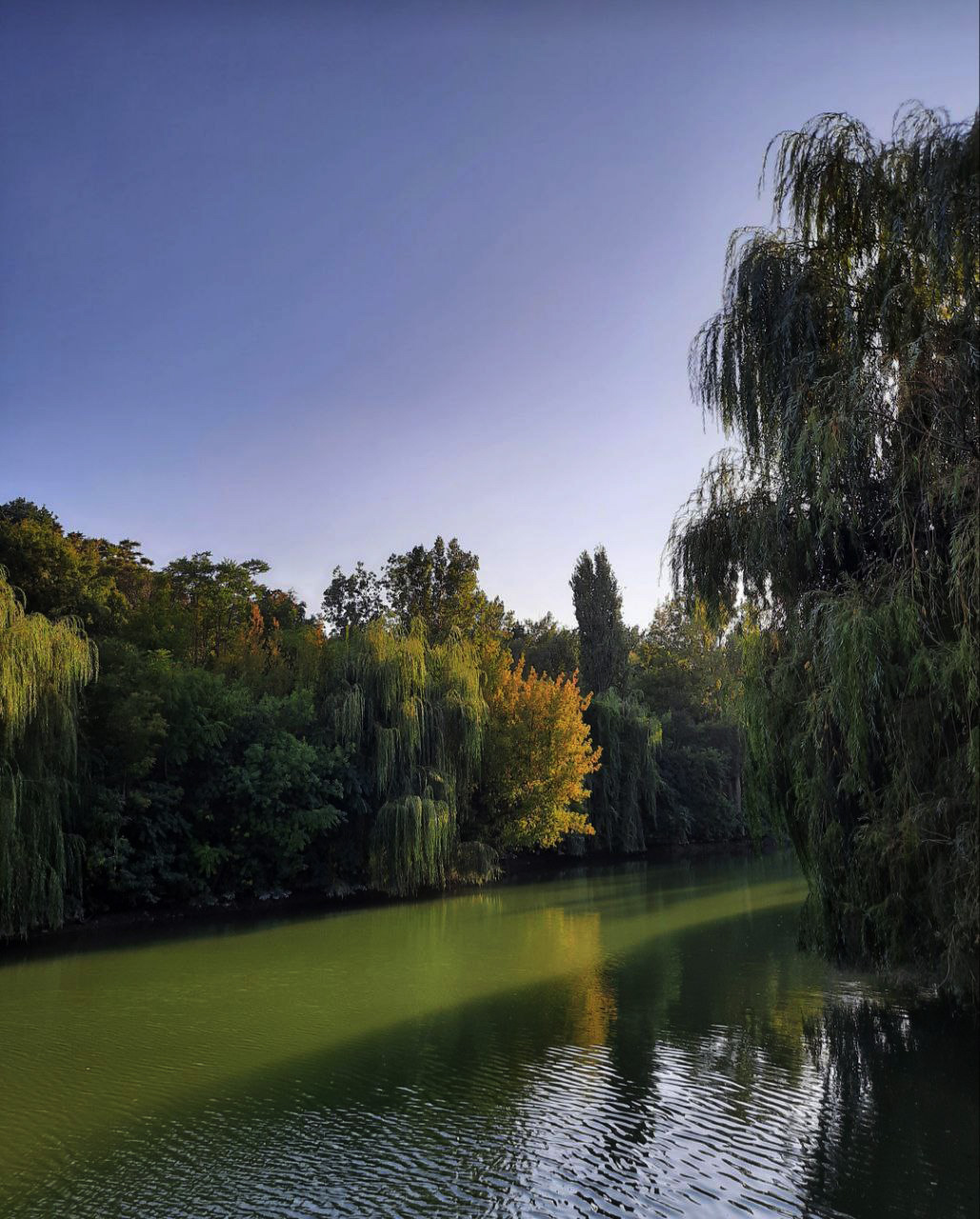
Dendropark

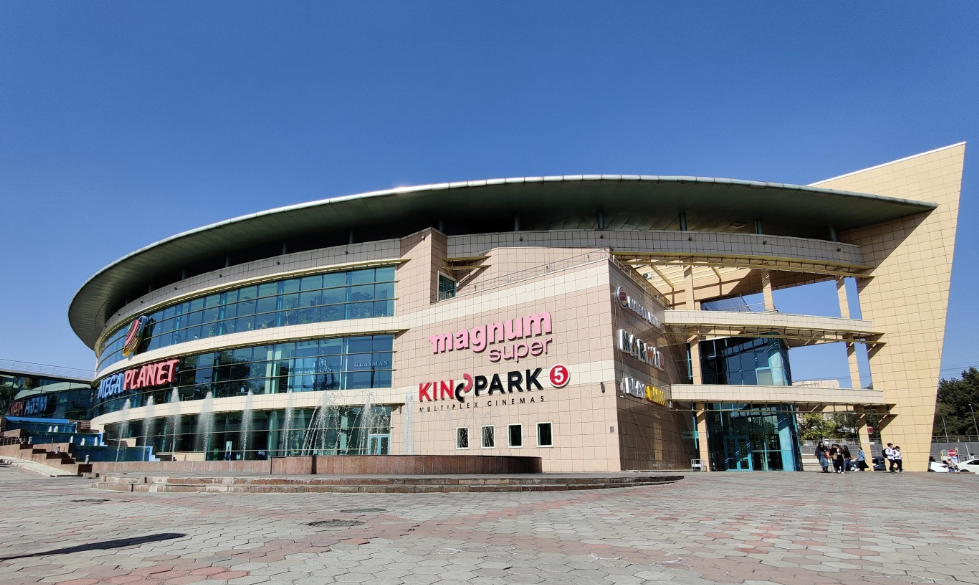
Shopping mall "Mega Planet" in Shymkent, Kazakhstan

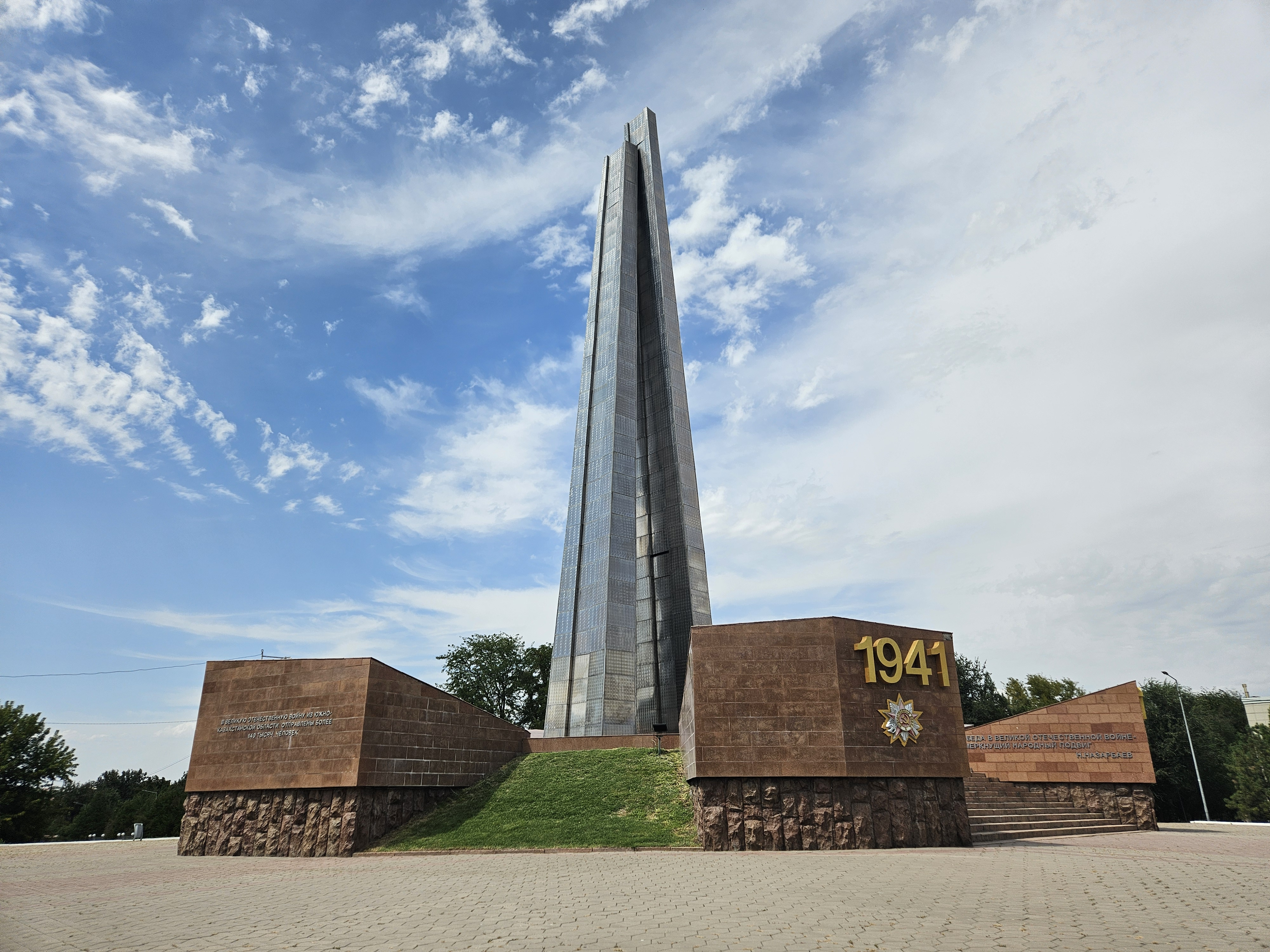
The World War 2 memorial of Abay Park
