= ISO 3166-2:KZ =

Entry for Kazakhstan in ISO 3166-2

ISO 3166-2:KZ is the entry for Kazakhstan in ISO 3166-2, part of the ISO 3166 standard published by the International Organization for Standardization (ISO), which defines codes for the names of the principal subdivisions (e.g., provinces or states) of all countries coded in ISO 3166-1.

Currently for Kazakhstan, ISO 3166-2 codes are defined for three cities and 17 regions. The cities Almaty and Astana are the former and current capitals of the country respectively and have special status equal to the regions.

Each code consists of two parts separated by a hyphen. The first part is KZ, the ISO 3166-1 alpha-2 code of Kazakhstan. The second part is two digits.

== Current codes ==
Subdivision names are listed as in the ISO 3166-2 standard published by the ISO 3166 Maintenance Agency (ISO 3166/MA).

ISO 639-1 codes are used to represent subdivision names in the following administrative languages:

- (kk): Kazakh
- (ru): Russian

Click on the button in the header to sort each column.

Code	Subdivision name (kk) (BGN/PCGN 1979)	Subdivision name (kk) (Note: For reference only, Kazakh name in Cyrillic script not included in the ISO 3166-2 standard.)	Subdivision name (ru)		Subdivision name (ru) (Note: For reference only, Russian name in Cyrillic script not included in the ISO 3166-2 standard.)	Subdivision name (en) (Note: For reference only, English name not included in the ISO 3166-2 standard.)	Subdivision category
Code	Subdivision name (kk) (BGN/PCGN 1979)	Subdivision name (kk)	(BGN/PCGN 1947)	(GOST 1983 = UN V/18 1987)	Subdivision name (ru)	Subdivision name (en)	Subdivision category
KZ-10	Abay oblysy	Абай облысы	Abayskaya oblast'	Abajskaja oblast'	Абайская область	Abai	region
KZ-75	Almaty	Алматы	Almaty	Almaty	Алматы	Almaty City	city
KZ-19	Almaty oblysy	Алматы облысы	Almatinskaya oblast'	Almatinskaja oblast'	Алматинская область	Almaty	region
KZ-11	Aqmola oblysy	Ақмола облысы	Akmolinskaya oblast'	Akmolinskaja oblast'	Акмолинская область	Akmola	region
KZ-15	Aqtöbe oblysy	Ақтөбе облысы	Aktyubinskaya oblast'	Aktjubinskaja oblast'	Актюбинская область	Aktobe	region
KZ-71	Astana	Астана	Astana	Astana	Астана	Astana	city
KZ-23	Atyraū oblysy	Атырау облысы	Atyrauskaya oblast'	Atyrauskaja oblast'	Атырауская область	Atyrau	region
KZ-27	Batys Qazaqstan oblysy	Батыс Қазақстан облысы	Zapadno-Kazakhstanskaya oblast'	Zapadno-Kazahstanskaja oblast'	Западно-Казахстанская область	West Kazakhstan	region
KZ-47	Mangghystaū oblysy	Маңғыстау облысы	Mangistauskaya oblast'	Mangystauskaja oblast'	Мангистауская область	Mangystau	region
KZ-55	Pavlodar oblysy	Павлодар облысы	Pavlodarskaya oblast'	Pavlodarskaja oblast'	Павлодарская область	Pavlodar	region
KZ-35	Qaraghandy oblysy	Қарағанды облысы	Karagandinskaya oblast'	Karagandinskaja oblast'	Карагандинская область	Karaganda	region
KZ-39	Qostanay oblysy	Қостанай облысы	Kostanayskaya oblast'	Kostanajskaja oblast'	Костанайская область	Kostanay	region
KZ-43	Qyzylorda oblysy	Қызылорда облысы	Kyzylordinskaya oblast'	Kyzylordinskaja oblast'	Кызылординская область	Kyzylorda	region
KZ-63	Shyghys Qazaqstan oblysy	Шығыс Қазақстан облысы	Vostochno-Kazakhstanskaya oblast'	Vostočno-Kazahstanskaja oblast'	Восточно-Казахстанская область	East Kazakhstan	region
KZ-79	Shymkent	Шымкент	Shymkent	Šimkent	Шымкент	Shymkent	city
KZ-59	Soltüstik Qazaqstan oblysy	Солтүстік Қазақстан облысы	Severo-Kazakhstanskaya oblast'	Severo-Kazahstanskaja oblast'	Северо-Казахстанская область	North Kazakhstan	region
KZ-61	Türkistan oblysy	Түркістан облысы	Turkestankaya oblast'	Turkestanskaja oblast'	Туркестанская область	Turkistan	region
KZ-62	Ulytaū oblysy	Ұлытау облысы	Ulytauskaya oblast'	Ulytauskaja oblast'	Улытауская область	Ulytau	region
KZ-31	Zhambyl oblysy	Жамбыл облысы	Zhambylskaya oblast'	Žambylskaja oblast'	Жамбылская область	Jambyl	region
KZ-33	Zhetisū oblysy	Жетісу облысы	Zhetysuskaya oblast'	Žetysuskaja oblast'	Жетысуская область	Jetisu	region

== Changes ==
The following changes to the entry are listed on ISO's online catalogue, the Online Browsing Platform:

Effective date of change	Short description of change	Code/Subdivision change
2016-11-15	Addition of city KZ-BAY; update List Source.	Subdivisions added: KZ-BAY
2018-11-26	Correction of the romanization system label; Addition of city KZ-SHY; Change of subdivision name of KZ-YUZ; Update List Source	Subdivision added: KZ-SHY; Name change: KZ-YUZ Ongtüstik Qazaqstan oblysy (kk), Yuzhno-Kazakhstankaya oblast' (ru BGN/PCGN), Južno-Kazahstankaja oblast' (ru GOST) → Türkistan oblysy (kk), Turkestankaya oblast' (ru BGN/PCGN), Turkestanskaja oblast' (ru GOST)
2020-11-24	Deletion of city KZ-BAY; Change of subdivision name of KZ‐AST; Correction of the Code Source; Update List Source	Subdivision deleted: KZ-BAY Bayqongyr; Name change: KZ-AST Astana → Nur-Sultan
2022-11-29	Change of subdivision code from KZ-ALA to KZ-75, KZ-AST to KZ-71, KZ-SHY to KZ-79, KZ-ALM to KZ-19, KZ-AKM to KZ-11, KZ-AKT to KZ-15, KZ-ATY to KZ-23, KZ-VOS to KZ-63, KZ-MAN to KZ-47, KZ-SEV to KZ-59, KZ-YUZ to KZ-61, KZ-PAV to KZ-55, KZ-KAR to KZ-35, KZ-KUS to KZ-39, KZ-KZY to KZ-43, KZ-ZAP to KZ-27, KZ-ZHA to KZ-31; Addition of region KZ-10, KZ-33, KZ-62; Change of subdivision name for KZ-71 in kaz and rus; Update List Source; Update Code Source	Codes changed: KZ-ALA → KZ-75; KZ-AST → KZ-71; KZ-SHY → KZ-79; KZ-ALM → KZ-19; KZ-AKM → KZ-11; KZ-AKT → KZ-15; KZ-ATY → KZ-23; KZ-VOS → KZ-63; KZ-MAN → KZ-47; KZ-SEV → KZ-59; KZ-YUZ → KZ-61; KZ-PAV → KZ-55; KZ-KAR → KZ-35; KZ-KUS → KZ-39; KZ-KZY → KZ-43; KZ-ZAP → KZ-27; KZ-ZHA → KZ-31; Subdivisions added: KZ-10, KZ-33, and KZ-62; Name change: KZ-71 Nur-Sultan → Astana

The following changes to the entry have been announced in newsletters by the ISO 3166/MA since the first publication of ISO 3166-2 in 1998:

Newsletter	Date issued	Description of change in newsletter	Code/Subdivision change
Newsletter I-2	2002-05-21	Addition of one city. Nine name spellings corrected. List source updated	Subdivisions added: KZ-AST Astana
Newsletter I-3	2002-08-20	Error correction: Various spelling corrections	
Newsletter I-4	2002-12-10	Removal of one city from the list (Bayqongyr)	Subdivisions deleted: KZ-BAY Bayqongyr

== See also ==
- Subdivisions of Kazakhstan
- FIPS region codes of Kazakhstan
- Neighbouring countries: CN, KG, RU, TM, UZ
