= ISO 3166-2:IN =

Entry for India in ISO 3166-2

ISO 3166-2:IN is part of the ISO 3166 standardization codes published by the International Organization for Standardization (ISO) for India. It is part of the ISO 3166-2, which defines codes for the names of the principal subdivisions (provinces or states) of all countries coded in ISO 3166-1. ISO 3166-2 codes are defined for 28 states and eight union territories of India.

== Description ==
ISO 3166-2 codes is part of the ISO 3166 standardization codes published by the International Organization for Standardization (ISO). It is part of the ISO 3166-2, which defines codes for the names of the principal subdivisions (provinces or states) of all countries coded in ISO 3166-1.

== Current codes ==
Subdivision names are as listed in the ISO 3166-2 standard published by the ISO 3166 Maintenance Agency as per the Indian System of Transliteration.

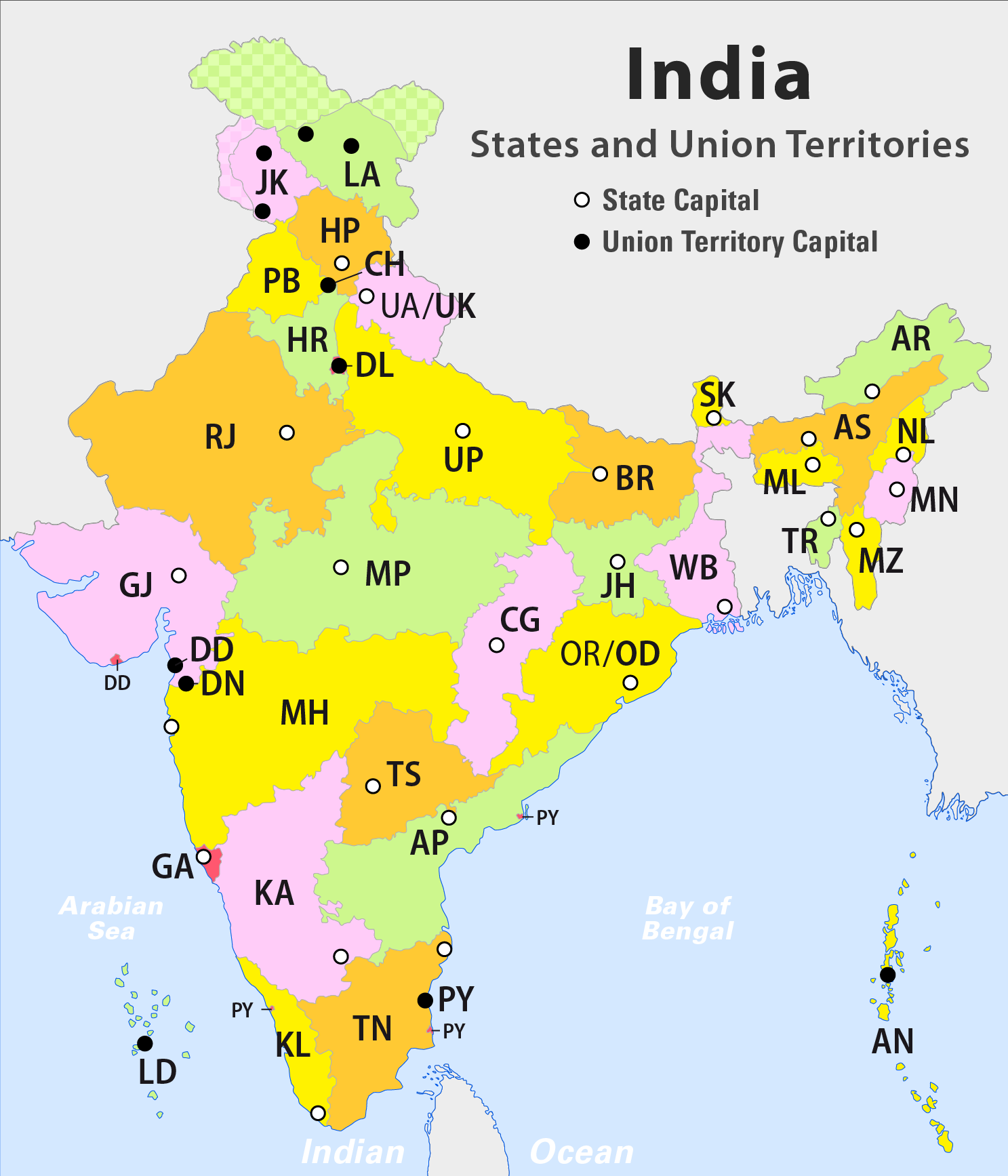
ISO 3166-2 codes of Indian states and union territories.

ISO 3166:IN codes
Code	Subdivision Name	Subdivision category
IN-AN	Andaman and Nicobar Islands	Union territory
IN-AP	Andhra Pradesh	State
IN-AR	Arunāchal Pradesh	State
IN-AS	Assam	State
IN-BR	Bihār	State
IN-CH	Chandigarh	Union territory
IN-CG	Chhattīsgarh	State
IN-DH	Dādra and Nagar Haveli and Damān and Diu	Union territory
IN-DL	Delhi	Union territory
IN-GA	Goa	State
IN-GJ	Gujarāt	State
IN-HR	Haryāna	State
IN-HP	Himāchal Pradesh	State
IN-JK	Jammu and Kashmīr	Union territory
IN-JH	Jhārkhand	State
IN-KA	Karnātaka	State
IN-KL	Kerala	State
IN-LA	Ladākh	Union territory
IN-LD	Lakshadweep	Union territory
IN-MP	Madhya Pradesh	State
IN-MH	Mahārāshtra	State
IN-MN	Manipur	State
IN-ML	Meghālaya	State
IN-MZ	Mizoram	State
IN-NL	Nāgāland	State
IN-OD	Odisha	State
IN-PY	Puducherry (Pondicherry)	Union territory
IN-PB	Punjab	State
IN-RJ	Rājasthān	State
IN-SK	Sikkim	State
IN-TN	Tamil Nādu	State
IN-TS	Telangāna	State
IN-TR	Tripura	State
IN-UP	Uttar Pradesh	State
IN-UK	Uttarākhand	State
IN-WB	West Bengal	State

== Changes ==
The following changes were made to the entries corresponding to the ISO:3166 codes for India.

Date issued	Description	Changes	Source
21 May 2002	Partial reorganization of subdivision layout with the addition of three new states.	IN-CH Chhattīsgarh; IN-JH Jhārkhand; IN-UL Uttarānchal	
21 May 2002	Addition of an alternative name for one state.	IN-WB West Bengal → IN-WB West Bengal/Banga	
21 May 2002	Spelling corrections.	As per the Indian system of transliteration	
21 May 2002	New list source.	ISO 3166 Maintenance Agency	
20 August 2002	Error correction: Duplicate use of IN-CH corrected.	IN-CH Chhattīsgarh → IN-CT Chhattīsgarh	
20 August 2002	Spelling correction.	IN-RJ Rajasthan → IN-RJ Rājasthān	
10 December 2002	Error correction: Reintroduction of old name form in IN-WB	IN-WB West Bengal/Banga → IN-WB West Bengal	
13 December 2011	Addition of local generic administrative terms.	IN-UL Uttaranchal → IN-UT Uttarakhand; IN-PY Pondicherry → IN-PY Puducherry (Pondicherry); Revert to standard system of spelling from Indian System of Transliteration	
13 December 2011	Update of the official languages according to ISO 3166-2.	India (English) and Bhārat (Hindi)	
13 December 2011	Addition of a comment.	The forms used in the list are English-language forms provided by India.	
13 December 2011	Source list update.	Addition of sources: Statoids, Geonames	
30 October 2014	Add one state.	IN-TG Telangana	
30 October 2014	Change spelling.	IN-OR Orissa → IN-OR Odisha	
30 October 2014	Update list source and code source.		
22 November 2019	Change of subdivision category from state to Union territory.	IN-JK Jammu and Kashmir	
22 November 2019	Addition of Union territory.	IN-LA Ladakh	
22 November 2019	Update list source		
11 November 2020	Deletion of Union territory.	IN-DN Dadra and Nagar Haveli; IN-DD Diu and Daman	
11 November 2020	Addition of Union territory.	IN-DH Dadra and Nagar Haveli and Diu and Daman	
11 November 2020	Correction of spelling.	Addition of Indian system of transliteration	
11 November 2020	Update list source and correction of the code source		
23 November 2023	Change of subdivision codes.	IN-OR Odisha → IN-OD Odisha; IN-CT Chhattīsgarh → IN-CG Chhattīsgarh; IN-TG Telangāna → IN-TS Telangāna; IN-UT Uttarākhand → IN-UK Uttarākhand	
23 November 2023	Deletion of the asterisk.	From IN-JH Jhārkhand	
23 November 2023	Update code source.		

== See also ==
- Administrative divisions of India
- Neighbouring countries: AF, BD, BT, CN, MM, NP, PK
- FIPS region codes of India
