= Postal codes in Russia =

Russian Post has a system of postal codes (Russian: почтовый индекс, pochtovyy indeks) based on the federal subject a place is located in. The current six-digit postcode system came into public use in the USSR in 1971, when automatic sorting by postcode began. To simplify automatic recognition of postal codes, envelopes were printed with a preprinted nine-segment outline for each digit, which the sender could fill in, although this was not necessary and the postal code could also be written by hand. Each postal code consists of six digits, with the first three referring to the federal subject or the administrative division with special status. Some larger subjects have multiple three-digit prefixes. For instance, Moscow's postal codes fall in the range 101–129. The code usually identifies the post office.

Larger cities/towns have a "pochtamt" (Russian: почтамт, from German Postamt), or a main post office, which is assigned the main postal code for the city. For instance Moscow's pochtamt has a postal code of 101000. One street in a big city can have several postal codes; for instance, in Saint Petersburg (with postal codes falling in the range 190–199), Kirochnaya Street has the following postal codes: 191028, 191123, 191124, 191015, 191014, which are based on house numbers.

Russian postcodes: Upper image: preprinted at the bottom left corner of the envelope are six nine-segment grids to be filled with the six digits of the postal code. Bottom image: samples of each digit in the grid format.

Post codes in Russia are fully compatible and non-overlapping with postal codes in Belarus.

In 2014, after the occupation of Crimea by Russia some areas of Ukraine were assigned Russian postal codes in the range 295–299, adding an initial 2 to the existing Ukrainian five-digit codes.

== See also ==
- ISO 3166-2:RU
