= BD5 =

BD5, Bd5 or BD-5 may refer to:

== Places ==
- BD5 (postcode district), a district of the Bradford postcode area in the UK.
- ISO-3166:BD-05, the ISO 3166-2:BD subdivision code for Bagerhat District, Bangladesh

== In science and technology ==
- BD5 (Blu-ray format), an unofficial name for a Blu-ray disc format using a single-layer 4.7 GB DVD
- Bede BD-5, a small kit aircraft by Bede Aviation
- 1998 BD5, a designation for the asteroid 10628 Feuerbacher

== Other uses ==
- Bd5, a chess move recorded in algebraic notation.
