= ISO 3166-2:AM =

Entry for Armenia in ISO 3166-2

ISO 3166-2:AM is the entry for Armenia in ISO 3166-2, part of the ISO 3166 standard published by the International Organization for Standardization (ISO), which defines codes for the names of the principal subdivisions (e.g., provinces or states) of all countries coded in ISO 3166-1.

Currently for Armenia, ISO 3166-2 codes are defined for one city and ten regions. The city Yerevan is the capital of the country and has special status equal to the regions.

Each code consists of two parts, separated by a hyphen. The first part is AM, the ISO 3166-1 alpha-2 code of Armenia. The second part is two letters.

== Current codes ==
Subdivision names are listed as in the ISO 3166-2 standard published by the ISO 3166 Maintenance Agency (ISO 3166/MA).

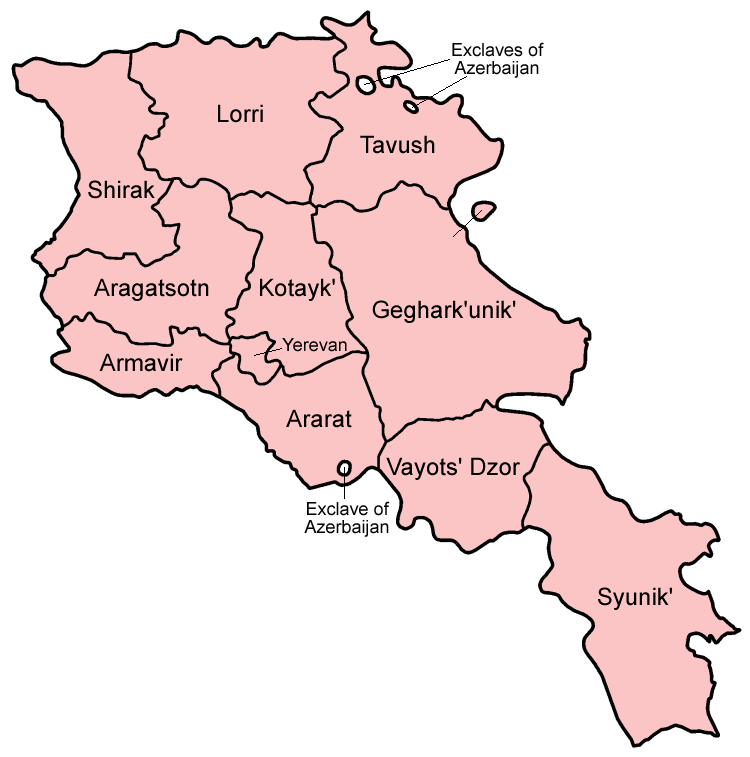

Click on the button in the header to sort each column.

Code	Subdivision name (hy) (ISO 9985:1996)	Subdivision name (hy) (Note: For reference only, Armenian name in Armenian script not included in the ISO 3166-2 standard.)	Subdivision name (en) (Note: For reference only, English name not included in the ISO 3166-2 standard.)	Subdivision category
AM-AG	Aragac̣otn	Արագածոտն	Aragatsotn	region
AM-AR	Ararat	Արարատ	Ararat	region
AM-AV	Armavir	Արմավիր	Armavir	region
AM-ER	Erevan	Երևան	Yerevan	city
AM-GR	Geġark'unik'	Գեղարքունիք	Gegharkunik	region
AM-KT	Kotayk'	Կոտայք	Kotayk	region
AM-LO	Loṙi	Լոռի	Lori	region
AM-SH	Širak	Շիրակ	Shirak	region
AM-SU	Syunik'	Սյունիք	Syunik	region
AM-TV	Tavuš	Տավուշ	Tavush	region
AM-VD	Vayoć Jor	Վայոց Ձոր	Vayots Dzor	region

== Changes ==
The following changes to the entry are listed on ISO's online catalogue, the Online Browsing Platform:

Effective date of change	Short description of change (en)
2018-11-26	Correction of the romanization system label

== See also ==
- Subdivisions of Armenia
- FIPS region codes of Armenia
- Neighbouring countries: AZ, GE, IR, TR
