= Postal codes in Turkey =

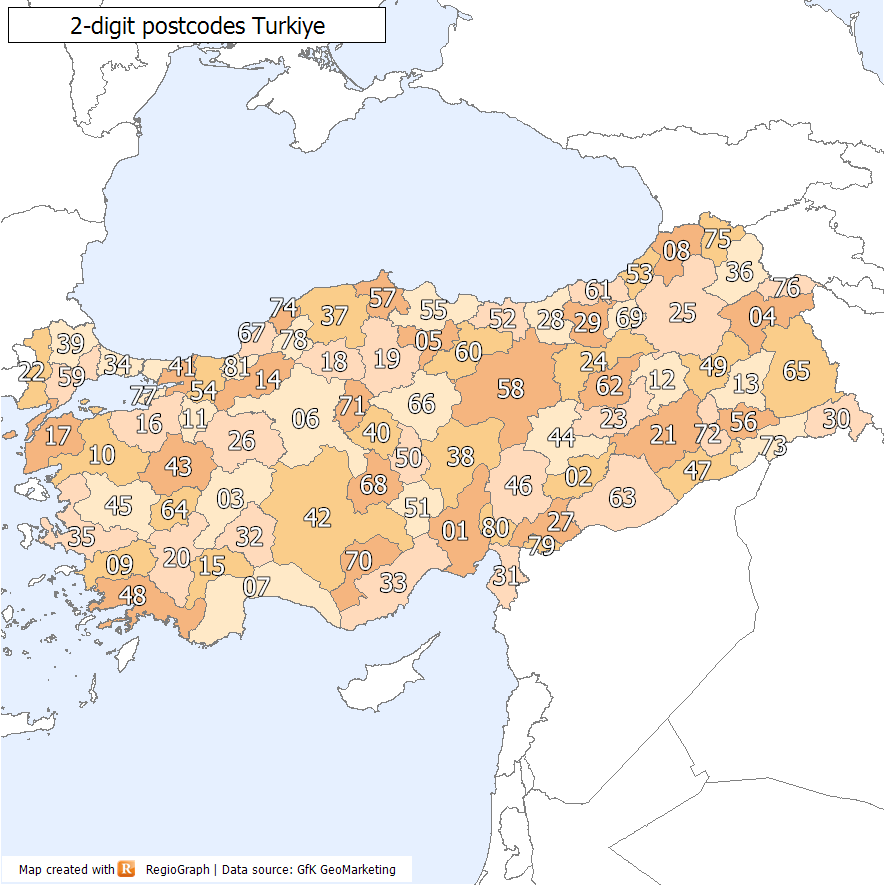
2-digit postcode areas Turkey(defined through the first two postcode digits)

Postal codes in Turkey (Turkish: Posta kodu) consist of five digits starting with the two digit license plate code of the provinces followed by three digits to specify the location within the districts of the province.

== See also ==
- ISO 3166-2:TR
