= ISO 3166-2:CN =

Entry for China in ISO 3166-2

ISO 3166-2:CN is the entry for China in ISO 3166-2, part of the ISO 3166 standard published by the International Organization for Standardization (ISO), which defines codes for the names of the principal subdivisions (e.g. provinces or states) of all countries coded in ISO 3166-1.

Currently for China, ISO 3166-2 codes are defined for the following province-level subdivisions:

- 23 provinces
- four direct-administered municipalities
- five autonomous regions
- two special administrative regions

The full name of China in ISO 3166 is the People's Republic of China (PRC). Yet China is de facto divided into the PRC and the Republic of China (Taiwan) with limited recognition. Taiwan, which consists of the namesake island and the Penghu Islands, is included as a province of China because of its political status within the United Nations, as even though it is de facto under the jurisdiction of the Republic of China instead of the People's Republic of China ("China"), the United Nations considers Taiwan as part of "China". In addition, Kinmen and the Matsu Islands in the fractured Fuchien (Fujian) Province are also governed by the ROC.

Each code consists of two parts, separated by a hyphen. The first part is CN, the ISO 3166-1 alpha-2 code of China. The second part is a two-letter alphabetic code specified by Guobiao GB/T 2260 (first published in 1991, prior to ISO 3166-2, first published in 1998).

== Current codes ==
Subdivision names are listed as in the ISO 3166-2 standard published by the ISO 3166 Maintenance Agency (ISO 3166/MA).

Click on the button in the header to sort each column.

Code	Subdivision name (zh) (Note: Name is in Pinyin Chinese (zh) except where noted.) (National 1958 = ISO 7098:2015 = UN III/8 1977)	Subdivision name (zh) (Note: For reference only, Chinese name in Pinyin Chinese with diacritics not included in the ISO 3166-2 standard.)	Subdivision name (zh) (Note: For reference only, Chinese name in Chinese characters not included in the ISO 3166-2 standard.)	Subdivision name (en) (Note: For reference only, English name not included in the ISO 3166-2 standard.)	Subdivision category
CN-AH	Anhui Sheng	Ānhuī Shěng	安徽省	Anhui	province
CN-BJ	Beijing Shi	Běijīng Shì	北京市	Beijing	municipality
CN-CQ	Chongqing Shi	Chóngqìng Shì	重庆市	Chongqing	municipality
CN-FJ	Fujian Sheng	Fújiàn Shěng	福建省	Fujian	province
CN-GS	Gansu Sheng	Gānsù Shěng	甘肃省	Gansu	province
CN-GD	Guangdong Sheng	Guǎngdōng Shěng	广东省	Guangdong	province
CN-GX	Guangxi Zhuangzu Zizhiqu	Guǎngxī Zhuàngzú Zìzhìqū	广西壮族自治区	Guangxi	autonomous region
CN-GZ	Guizhou Sheng	Guìzhōu Shěng	贵州省	Guizhou	province
CN-HI	Hainan Sheng	Hǎinán Shěng	海南省	Hainan	province
CN-HE	Hebei Sheng	Héběi Shěng	河北省	Hebei	province
CN-HL	Heilongjiang Sheng	Hēilóngjiāng Shěng	黑龙江省	Heilongjiang	province
CN-HA	Henan Sheng	Hénán Shěng	河南省	Henan	province
CN-HK	Hong Kong SAR (en); Xianggang Tebiexingzhengqu	Xiānggǎng Tèbiéxíngzhèngqū	香港特别行政区	Hong Kong	special administrative region
CN-HB	Hubei Sheng	Húběi Shěng	湖北省	Hubei	province
CN-HN	Hunan Sheng	Húnán Shěng	湖南省	Hunan	province
CN-JS	Jiangsu Sheng	Jiāngsū Shěng	江苏省	Jiangsu	province
CN-JX	Jiangxi Sheng	Jiāngxī Shěng	江西省	Jiangxi	province
CN-JL	Jilin Sheng	Jílín Shěng	吉林省	Jilin	province
CN-LN	Liaoning Sheng	Liáoníng Shěng	辽宁省	Liaoning	province
CN-MO	Macao SAR (en); Macau SAR (pt); Aomen Tebiexingzhengqu	Àomén Tèbiéxíngzhèngqū	澳门特别行政区	Macao	special administrative region
CN-NM	Nei Mongol Zizhiqu	Nèi Ménggǔ Zìzhìqū	内蒙古自治区	Inner Mongolia	autonomous region
CN-NX	Ningxia Huizu Zizhiqu	Níngxià Huízú Zìzhìqū	宁夏回族自治区	Ningxia	autonomous region
CN-QH	Qinghai Sheng	Qīnghǎi Shěng	青海省	Qinghai	province
CN-SN	Shaanxi Sheng	Shǎnxī Shěng	陕西省	Shaanxi	province
CN-SD	Shandong Sheng	Shāndōng Shěng	山东省	Shandong	province
CN-SH	Shanghai Shi	Shànghǎi Shì	上海市	Shanghai	municipality
CN-SX	Shanxi Sheng	Shānxī Shěng	山西省	Shanxi	province
CN-SC	Sichuan Sheng	Sìchuān Shěng	四川省	Sichuan	province
CN-TW	Taiwan Sheng	Táiwān Shěng	台湾省	Taiwan	province
CN-TJ	Tianjin Shi	Tiānjīn Shì	天津市	Tianjin	municipality
CN-XJ	Xinjiang Uygur Zizhiqu	Xīnjiāng Wéiwú'ěr Zìzhìqū	新疆维吾尔自治区	Xinjiang	autonomous region
CN-XZ	Xizang Zizhiqu	Xīzàng Zìzhìqū	西藏自治区	Tibet	autonomous region
CN-YN	Yunnan Sheng	Yúnnán Shěng	云南省	Yunnan	province
CN-ZJ	Zhejiang Sheng	Zhèjiāng Shěng	浙江省	Zhejiang	province

== Subdivisions included in ISO 3166-1 ==
Besides being included as subdivisions of China in ISO 3166-2, Taiwan, Hong Kong and Macao are also officially assigned their own country codes in ISO 3166-1.

Code	Entity	Subdivision name (claimed by China)	ISO 3166-1 name	ISO 3166-2 code
CN-HK	Hong Kong	Hong Kong SAR (en); Xianggang Tebiexingzhengqu (zh)	Hong Kong	ISO 3166-2:HK
CN-MO	Macau	Macao SAR (en); Macau SAR (pt); Aomen Tebiexingzhengqu (zh)	Macao	ISO 3166-2:MO
CN-TW	Republic of China (Taiwan)	Taiwan Sheng (zh)	Taiwan, Province of China	ISO 3166-2:TW

== Changes ==
The following changes to the entry have been announced in newsletters by the ISO 3166/MA since the first publication of ISO 3166-2 in 1998:

Newsletter	Date issued	Description of change in newsletter	Code/Subdivision change
Newsletter I-2	2002-05-21	Addition of one new entity. Precise specification and correction of Pinyin names. List source updated	Subdivisions added: CN-92 Macau
Newsletter I-6	2004-03-08	Deletion of one name form in CN-15	

The following changes to the entry are listed on ISO's online catalogue, the Online Browsing Platform:

Effective date of change	Short description of change (en)	Code/Subdivision change
2017-11-23	Change of subdivision codes change of subdivision name of CN-NM, CN-GX, CN-XZ, CN-NX, CN-XJ, CN-BJ, CN-TJ, CN-SH, CN-CQ, CN-HE, CN-SX, CN-LN, CN-JL, CN-HL CN-JS, CN-ZJ, CN-AH, CN-FJ, CN-JX, CN-SD, CN-HA, CN-HB, CN-HN, CN-GD, CN-HI, CN-SC, CN-GZ, CN-YN, CN-SN, CN-GS, CN-QH, CN-TW, CN-HK, CN-MO addition of remark in parentheses to subdivision name for CN-HK, CN-MO in English addition of region CN-MO in Portuguese update code source update list source	Change of subdivision code: CN-11 → CN-BJ; CN-12 → CN-TJ; CN-13 → CN-HE; CN-14 → CN-SX; CN-15 → CN-NM; CN-21 → CN-LN; CN-22 → CN-JL; CN-23 → CN-HL; CN-31 → CN-SH; CN-32 → CN-JS; CN-33 → CN-ZJ; CN-34 → CN-AH; CN-35 → CN-FJ; CN-36 → CN-JX; CN-37 → CN-SD; CN-41 → CN-HA; CN-42 → CN-HB; CN-43 → CN-HN; CN-44 → CN-GD; CN-45 → CN-GX; CN-46 → CN-HI; CN-50 → CN-CQ; CN-51 → CN-SC; CN-52 → CN-GZ; CN-53 → CN-YN; CN-54 → CN-XZ; CN-61 → CN-SN; CN-62 → CN-GS; CN-63 → CN-QH; CN-64 → CN-NX; CN-65 → CN-XJ; CN-71 → CN-TW; CN-91 → CN-HK; CN-92 → CN-MO
2018-11-26	Correction of the romanization system label	
2019-11-22	Change language from mon to zho for CN-NM	
2021-11-25	Change of spelling of CN-NX; Update List Source	

== See also ==
- Administrative divisions of China
- FIPS region codes of China
- Neighbouring countries: (HK, MO,) AF, BT, IN, KG, KP, KZ, LA, MM, MN, NP, PK, RU, TJ, VN
