= ISO 3166-2:PK =

Entry for Pakistan in ISO 3166-2

ISO 3166-2:PK is the entry for Pakistan in ISO 3166-2, part of the ISO 3166 standard published by the International Organization for Standardization (ISO), which defines codes for the names of the principal subdivisions (e.g., provinces or states) of all countries coded in ISO 3166-1.

Currently for Pakistan, ISO 3166-2 codes are defined for one federal capital territory, four provinces and two Pakistan administered areas. The Islamabad Capital Territory contains the capital of the country Islamabad and has special status equal to the provinces and territory.

Each code consists of two parts separated by a hyphen. The first part is PK, the ISO 3166-1 alpha-2 code of Pakistan. The second part is two letters.

== Current codes ==
Subdivision names are listed as in the ISO 3166-2 standard published by the ISO 3166 Maintenance Agency (ISO 3166/MA).

ISO 639-1 codes are used to represent subdivision names in the following administrative languages:

- (ur): Urdu
- (en): English

Click on the button in the header to sort each column.

Code	Subdivision name (ur) (BGN/PCGN 2007)	Subdivision name (ur) (Note: For reference only, Urdu name in Urdu script not included in the ISO 3166-2 standard.)	Subdivision name (en)	Subdivision category
PK-JK	Āzād Jammūñ o Kashmīr	آزاد جموں و کشمیر	Azad Jammu and Kashmir (local variant: AJ&K)	Pakistan administered area
PK-BA	Balōchistān	بلوچستان	Balochistan	province
PK-GB	Gilgit-Baltistān	گلگت بلتستان	Gilgit-Baltistan	Pakistan administered area
PK-IS	Islāmābād	وفاقی دارالحکومت	Islamabad	federal capital territory
PK-KP	Khaībar Pakhtūnkhwā	خیبر پختونخوا	Khyber Pakhtunkhwa	province
PK-PB	Panjāb	پنجاب	Punjab	province
PK-SD	Sindh	سِنْدھ	Sindh	province

== Former codes ==
Code	Subdivision name (en)	Subdivision category
PK-TA	Federally Administered Tribal Areas	territory

== Changes ==
The following changes to the entry have been announced in newsletters by the ISO 3166/MA since the first publication of ISO 3166-2 in 1998:

Newsletter	Date issued	Description of change in newsletter	Code/Subdivision change
Newsletter II-3	2011-12-13 (corrected 2011-12-15)	Name change, language readjustment and source list update.	Codes: PK-NW North-West Frontier → PK-KP Khyber Pakhtunkhwa; PK-NA Northern Areas → PK-GB Gilgit-Baltistan
Online Browsing; Platform (OBP)	2015-11-27	Addition of romanization system for urd	
Online Browsing; Platform (OBP)	2017-11-23	Change of spelling of category name from ilaqa to ‘alāqahilaqa, from suba to sūbah, from wafaqi dar-ul-hakumat ka ilaqa to wafāqī dār al ḩikūmat ‘alāqah; change of subdivision name of PK-JK (eng & urd); addition of local variation of PK-JK in eng; update List Source	(TBD)
Online Browsing; Platform (OBP)	2019-11-22	Deletion of territory PK-TA; Update List Source	(TBD)

== See also ==
- Administrative units of Pakistan
- FIPS region codes of Pakistan
- Neighbouring countries: AF, CN, IN, IR, OM
