= ISO 3166-2:BT =

Entry for Bhutan in ISO 3166-2

ISO 3166-2:BT is the entry for Bhutan in ISO 3166-2, part of the ISO 3166 standard published by the International Organization for Standardization (ISO), which defines codes for the names of the principal subdivisions (e.g., provinces or states) of all countries coded in ISO 3166-1.

Currently for Bhutan, ISO 3166-2 codes are defined for 20 districts.

Each code consists of two parts, separated by a hyphen. The first part is BT, the ISO 3166-1 alpha-2 code of Bhutan. The second part is two digits, except Gasa and Trashi Yangtse, which use two letters instead. The first digit indicates the zone where the district is in:

- 1: Western
- 2: Central (Gasa is also in this zone)
- 3: Southern
- 4: Eastern (Trashi Yangtse is also in this zone)

== Current codes ==
Subdivision names are listed as in the ISO 3166-2 standard published by the ISO 3166 Maintenance Agency (ISO 3166/MA).

Click on the button in the header to sort each column.

Code	Subdivision name (dz) (National 1997)	Subdivision name (dz) (Note: For reference only, Dzongkha name in Dzongkha script not included in the ISO 3166-2 standard.)
BT-33	Bumthang	བུམ་ཐང་
BT-12	Chhukha	ཆུ་ཁ་
BT-22	Dagana	དར་དཀར་ན་
BT-GA	Gasa	མགར་ས་
BT-13	Haa	ཧཱ་
BT-44	Lhuentse	ལྷུན་རྩེ་
BT-42	Monggar	མོང་སྒར་
BT-11	Paro	སྤ་རོ་
BT-43	Pema Gatshel	པད་མ་དགའ་ཚལ་
BT-23	Punakha	སྤུ་ན་ཁ་
BT-45	Samdrup Jongkhar	བསམ་གྲུབ་ལྗོངས་མཁར
BT-14	Samtse	བསམ་རྩེ་
BT-31	Sarpang	གསར་སྤང་
BT-15	Thimphu	ཐིམ་ཕུ་
BT-41	Trashigang	བཀྲ་ཤིས་སྒང་
BT-TY	Trashi Yangtse	བཀྲ་ཤིས་གྱང་ཙེ་
BT-32	Trongsa	ཀྲོང་གསར་
BT-21	Tsirang	རྩི་རང་
BT-24	Wangdue Phodrang	དབང་འདུས་ཕོ་བྲང་
BT-34	Zhemgang	གཞམས་སྒང་

== Changes ==
The following changes to the entry are listed on ISO's online catalogue, the Online Browsing Platform:

Effective date of change	Short description of change (en)
2014-11-03	Update List Source
2015-11-27	Update List Source
2016-11-15	Change of spelling of BT-13, BT-45; update list source
2018-11-26	Correction of the romanization system label
2020-11-24	Change of spelling of BT-43; Update List Source

== See also ==
- Subdivisions of Bhutan
- FIPS region codes of Bhutan
- Neighbouring countries: CN, IN
