= ISO 3166-2:VN =

Entry for Vietnam in ISO 3166-2

ISO 3166-2:VN is the entry for Vietnam in ISO 3166-2, part of the ISO 3166 standard published by the International Organization for Standardization (ISO), which defines codes for the names of the principal subdivisions (e.g., provinces or states) of all countries coded in ISO 3166-1.

Currently for Vietnam, ISO 3166-2 codes are defined for 58 provinces and five municipalities. The municipalities have special status equal to the provinces. However, those definition and assignment have become obsoleted in practice and are subjects to be updated, following the Plan to arrange and merge administrative units in Vietnam 2024–2025.

Each code consists of two parts separated by a hyphen. The first part is VN, the ISO 3166-1 alpha-2 code of Vietnam. The second part either of the following:

- two digits: provinces
- two letters: municipalities

The current Vietnamese entry is inherited from the entry representing the former Republic of Viet-Nam, while Democratic Republic of Viet-Nam used a different profile (VD/VDR), which has been retired and achieved under ISO 3166-3 as "VDVN".

== Current codes ==
Subdivision names are listed as in the ISO 3166-2 standard published by the ISO 3166 Maintenance Agency (ISO 3166/MA).

Click on the button in the header to sort each column. Names are sorted according to the Vietnamese alphabet: a, ă, â, b-d, đ, e, ê, f-o, ô, ơ, p-u, ư, v-z (with alphabetization proceeding on a word-by-word basis, e.g. all names starting with Hà sort before all names with Hải).

Code	Subdivision name (vi)	Subdivision category
VN-44	An Giang	province
VN-43	Bà Rịa - Vũng Tàu	province
VN-54	Bắc Giang	province
VN-53	Bắc Kạn	province
VN-55	Bạc Liêu	province
VN-56	Bắc Ninh	province
VN-50	Bến Tre	province
VN-31	Bình Định	province
VN-57	Bình Dương	province
VN-58	Bình Phước	province
VN-40	Bình Thuận	province
VN-59	Cà Mau	province
VN-CT	Cần Thơ	municipality
VN-04	Cao Bằng	province
VN-DN	Đà Nẵng	municipality
VN-33	Đắk Lắk	province
VN-72	Đắk Nông	province
VN-71	Điện Biên	province
VN-39	Đồng Nai	province
VN-45	Đồng Tháp	province
VN-30	Gia Lai	province
VN-03	Hà Giang	province
VN-63	Hà Nam	province
VN-HN	Hà Nội	municipality
VN-23	Hà Tĩnh	province
VN-61	Hải Dương	province
VN-HP	Hải Phòng	municipality
VN-73	Hậu Giang	province
VN-SG	Hồ Chí Minh (local variant is Sai Gon)	municipality
VN-14	Hòa Bình	province
VN-66	Hưng Yên	province
VN-34	Khánh Hòa	province
VN-47	Kiến Giang	province
VN-28	Kon Tum	province
VN-01	Lai Châu	province
VN-35	Lâm Đồng	province
VN-09	Lạng Sơn	province
VN-02	Lào Cai	province
VN-41	Long An	province
VN-67	Nam Định	province
VN-22	Nghệ An	province
VN-18	Ninh Bình	province
VN-36	Ninh Thuận	province
VN-68	Phú Thọ	province
VN-32	Phú Yên	province
VN-24	Quảng Bình	province
VN-27	Quảng Nam	province
VN-29	Quảng Ngãi	province
VN-13	Quảng Ninh	province
VN-25	Quảng Trị	province
VN-52	Sóc Trăng	province
VN-05	Sơn La	province
VN-37	Tây Ninh	province
VN-20	Thái Bình	province
VN-69	Thái Nguyên	province
VN-21	Thanh Hóa	province
VN-26	Thừa Thiên-Huế	province
VN-46	Tiền Giang	province
VN-51	Trà Vinh	province
VN-07	Tuyên Quang	province
VN-49	Vĩnh Long	province
VN-70	Vĩnh Phúc	province
VN-06	Yên Bái	province

== Changes ==
The following changes to the entry have been announced by the ISO 3166/MA since the first publication of ISO 3166-2 in 1998. ISO stopped issuing newsletters in 2013.

Newsletter	Date issued	Description of change in newsletter	Code/Subdivision change
Newsletter I-1	2000-06-21	Duplicate assignment of VN-24 corrected. Correction of 1 subdivision name. Correction of alphabetic sorting of subdivision names	Codes: (to correct duplicate use); Quảng Ninh: VN-24 → VN-13
Newsletter I-2	2002-05-21	Spelling correction in VN-65	
Newsletter I-7	2005-09-13	Addition of 3 provinces. Update of list source	Subdivisions added: VN-72 Đắk Nông; VN-71 Điện Biên; VN-73 Hậu Giang
Newsletter II-3	2011-12-13 (corrected 2011-12-15)	Administrative adjustment update, typo corrections and source list update.	Subdivision layout: 5 provinces → 5 municipalities
Online Browsing; Platform (OBP)	2013-02-06	Correct spelling error in French long name	
Online Browsing; Platform (OBP)	2014-11-03	Delete subdivision VN-15; change spelling for all the provinces except for VN-28, VN-30, VN-41 and VN-44; update List Source	Subdivision deleted: VN-15 Ha Tay (Merged into VN-HN in 2008)
Online Browsing; Platform (OBP)	2020-11-24	Change of spelling of VN-CT, VN-DN, VN-HN, VN-HP, VN-SG; Update List Source	Subdivision renamed: VN-CT Can Tho → Cần Thơ; VN-DN Da Nang → Đà Nẵng; VN-HN Ha Noi → Hà Nội; VN-HP Hai Phong → Hải Phòng; VN-SG Ho Chi Minh → Hồ Chí Minh

== See also ==
- Subdivisions of Vietnam
- FIPS region codes of Vietnam
- Neighbouring countries: CN, KH, LA
