= Administrative divisions of Turkey =

Turkey has a unitary structure in terms of administration and this aspect is one of the most important factors shaping the Turkish public administration. When three powers (executive, legislative and judiciary) are taken into account as the main functions of the state, local administrations have little power. Turkey is a highly centralized unitary system, and the provinces are subordinated to the centre. Local administrations were established to provide services in place and the government is represented by the governors and city governors. Besides the governors and the city governors, other senior public officials are also appointed by the central government rather than appointed by mayors or elected by constituents.

Within this unitary framework, Turkey is subdivided into 81 provinces for administrative purposes. Each province is divided into districts, for a total of 973 districts in the country. Turkey is also subdivided into 7 regions and 21 subregions for geographic, demographic and economic purposes; this does not refer to an administrative division.

The largely centralized structure of decision-making in Ankara is often considered an impediment to good governance, and causes resentment in particular in ethnic minority regions. Steps towards decentralization since 2004 have proved to be a highly controversial topic in Turkey. Turkey is obligated under the European Charter of Local Self-Government to decentralize its administrative structure. A decentralization program for Turkey is an ongoing discussion in the country's academics, politics and the broader public.

Turkey is subdivided in a hierarchical manner:

- Provinces & Metropolitan municipalities
  - Districts & consolidated city-districts
    - Belde (semi-rural)
      - Villages (rural)
      - Neighbourhoods (urban)

== Provinces ==
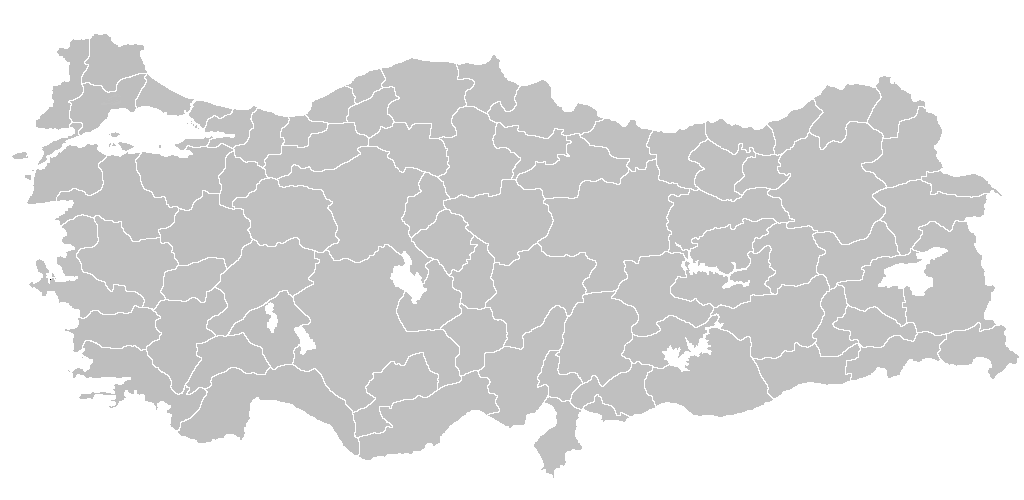

== Districts ==
Provinces and districts of Turkey

== See also ==
- Geographical regions of Turkey
- Provinces of Turkey
- Politics of Turkey
- Districts of Turkey
- Villages of Turkey
- List of municipalities in Turkey
- List of largest cities and towns in Turkey
- Metropolitan centers in Turkey
- Anatolian Tigers
- List of twin towns and sister cities in Turkey
- ISO 3166-2 codes of Turkey
- FIPS region codes of Turkey (standard withdrawn in 2008)
- NUTS statistical regions of Turkey
