= ISO 3166-2:IR =

Entry for Iran in ISO 3166-2

ISO 3166-2:IR is the entry for the Islamic Republic of Iran in ISO 3166-2, part of the ISO 3166 standard published by the International Organization for Standardization (ISO), which defines codes for the names of the principal subdivisions (e.g., provinces or states) of all countries coded in ISO 3166-1.

Currently for Iran, ISO 3166-2 codes are defined for 31 provinces.

Each code consists of two parts, separated by a hyphen. The first part is IR, the ISO 3166-1 alpha-2 code of Iran. The second part is two digits.

== Current codes ==
Subdivision names are listed as in the ISO 3166-2 standard published by the ISO 3166 Maintenance Agency (ISO 3166/MA).

Click on the button in the header to sort each column.

Code	Subdivision name (fa)	Subdivision name (fa)	Subdivision name (en)
IR-30	Alborz	البرز	Alborz
IR-24	Ardabīl	اردبیل	Ardabil
IR-04	Āz̄ārbāyjān-e Ghārbī	آذربایجان غربی	West Azerbaijan
IR-03	Āz̄ārbāyjān-e Shārqī	آذربایجان شرقی	East Azerbaijan
IR-18	Būshehr	بوشهر	Bushehr
IR-14	Chahār Maḩāl va Bakhtīārī	چهارمحال و بختیاری	Chaharmahal and Bakhtiari
IR-10	Eşfahān	اصفهان	Isfahan
IR-07	Fārs	فارس	Fars
IR-01	Gīlān	گیلان	Gilan
IR-27	Golestān	گلستان	Golestan
IR-13	Hamadān	همدان	Hamadan
IR-22	Hormozgān	هرمزگان	Hormozgan
IR-16	Īlām	ایلام	Ilam
IR-08	Kermān	کرمان	Kerman
IR-05	Kermānshāh	کرمانشاه	Kermanshah
IR-29	Khorāsān-e Jonūbī	خراسان جنوبی	South Khorasan
IR-09	Khorāsān-e Raẕavī	خراسان رضوی	Central Khorasan
IR-28	Khorāsān-e Shomālī	خراسان شمالی	North Khorasan
IR-06	Khūzestān	خوزستان	Khuzestan
IR-17	Kohgīlūyeh va Bowyer Aḩmad	کهگیلویه و بویراحمد	Kohgiluyeh and Boyer-Ahmad
IR-12	Kordestān	کردستان	Kurdistan
IR-15	Lorestān	لرستان	Lorestan
IR-00	Markazī	مرکزی	Markazi
IR-02	Māzandarān	مازندران	Mazandaran
IR-26	Qazvīn	قزوین	Qazvin
IR-25	Qom	قم	Qom
IR-20	Semnān	سمنان	Semnan
IR-11	Sīstān va Balūchestān	سیستان و بلوچستان	Sistan and Baluchestan
IR-23	Tehrān	تهران	Tehran
IR-21	Yazd	یزد	Yazd
IR-19	Zanjān	زنجان	Zanjan

== Changes ==
The following changes to the entry have been announced in newsletters by the ISO 3166/MA since the first publication of ISO 3166-2 in 1998. ISO stopped issuing newsletters in 2013.

Newsletter	Date issued	Description of change in newsletter	Code/Subdivision change
Newsletter I-2	2002-05-21	Partial reorganization of subdivision layout. Two new provinces. Two name corrections (IR-17 and IR-18). New reference for the list source	Subdivisions added: IR-27 Golestān; IR-28 Qazvīn
Newsletter I-8	2007-04-17	Modification of the administrative structure	Subdivisions added: IR-29 Khorāsān-e Janūbī; IR-30 Khorāsān-e Razavī; IR-31 Khorāsān-e Shemālī; Subdivisions deleted: IR-09 Khorāsān

The following changes to the entry are listed on ISO's online catalogue, the Online Browsing Platform:

Effective date of change	Short description of change (en)
2014-10-30	Add 1 province IR-32; update List Source
2014-12-18	Alignment of the English short name upper and lower case with UNTERM
2020-11-24	Change of subdivision code from IR-01 to IR-03, IR-02 to IR-04, IR-03 to IR-24, IR-04 to IR-10, IR-05 to IR-16, IR-06 to IR-18, IR-07 to IR-23, IR-08 to IR-14, IR-10 to IR-06, IR-11 to IR-19, IR-12 to IR-20, IR-13 to IR-11, IR-14 to IR-07, IR-15 to IR-08, IR-16 to IR-12, IR-17 to IR-05, IR-18 to IR-17, IR-19 to IR-01, IR-20 to IR-15, IR-21 to IR-02, IR-22 to IR-00, IR-23 to IR-22, IR-24 to IR-13, IR-25 to IR-21, IR-26 to IR-25, IR-28 to IR-26, IR-30 to IR-09, IR-31 to IR-28, IR-32 to IR-30; Update Code Source
2024-02-29	Change of short name upper case: replace the parentheses with a comma

== See also ==
- Subdivisions of Iran
- FIPS region codes of Iran
- Neighbouring countries: AF, AM, AZ, IQ, PK, TM, TR
