= Divisions of Bangladesh =

First-level administrative divisions of Bangladesh

Divisions of Bangladesh; বাংলাদেশের বিভাগ; Bangladesher bibhag
- A clickable map of Bangladesh exhibiting its divisions.
- Category: Unitary state
- Location: People's Republic of Bangladesh
- Number: 8
- Populations: Highest: 39,675,000 (Dhaka); Lowest: 8,331,000 (Barisal)
- Areas: Largest: 33,908.55 km^{2} (13,092.16 sq mi) (Chittagong); Smallest: 10,584.06 km^{2} (4,086.53 sq mi) (Mymensingh)
- Government: Divisional Commission; Administrator; Divisional Commissioner
- Subdivisions: District

Divisions are the first-level administrative divisions in Bangladesh. As of 2024, there are eight divisions of Bangladesh, each named after the major city within its jurisdiction that also serves as the administrative seat of that division. Each division is divided into several districts which are further subdivided into upazilas (sub-districts), then union councils.

== History ==
Following the independence of Bangladesh in 1971, the country had four divisions: Chittagong Division, Dacca Division, Khulna Division, and Rajshahi Division. In 1982, the English spelling of the Dacca Division (along with the name of the capital city) was changed into Dhaka Division to more closely match the Bengali pronunciation.

In 1993, Barisal Division was split off from Khulna Division, and in 1995, Sylhet Division was split off from Chittagong Division. On 25 January 2010, Rangpur Division was split off from Rajshahi Division. On 14 September 2015, Mymensingh Division was split off from Dhaka Division and added as the eighth division. In 2015, the process started to create two more divisions: Comilla Division and Faridpur Division. In October 2021, Prime Minister Sheikh Hasina announced the formation of two new divisions, Meghna and Padma, named after the eponymous rivers, in the places of Comilla and Faridpur Divisions. However, these names were later rejected.

== The Divisional Commissioner ==
Divisional Commissioner is the administrative head of a division. Divisional Commissioner is appointed by the government from an Additional Secretary level officer of the Bangladesh Civil Service (B.C.S.) Administration Cadre. The role of a Divisional Commissioner's office is to act as the supervisory head of all the government offices (except the central government offices) situated in the division. A Divisional Commissioner is given the direct responsibility of supervising the revenue and development administration of a division. The Divisional Commissioner is assisted by several Additional Divisional Commissioners, Senior Assistant Commissioners and other bureaucratic officials.

== List of divisions ==
The following table outlines some key statistics about the eight divisions of Bangladesh as found in the 2011 Population and Housing Census conducted by the Bangladesh Bureau of Statistics (B.B.S.).

Division	Map	ISO codes	Capital	Est.	Subdivisions			Area (km^{2})	Population (2022)	Density (people/ km^{2}) (2022)
Division	Map	ISO codes	Capital	Est.	Districts	Upazilas	Union Councils	Area (km^{2})	Population (2022)	Density (people/ km^{2}) (2022)
Barisal Division		BD-A	Barisal	1993	6 Districts: Barguna, Barishal, Bhola, Jhalokathi, Patuakhali, Pirojpur	42	352	13,225.20	9,100,102	688
Chittagong Division		BD-B	Chittagong	1829	11 Districts: Bandarban, Brahmanbaria, Chandpur, Chittagong, Comilla, Cox's Bazar, Feni, Khagrachhari, Lakshmipur, Noakhali, Rangamati	104	949	33,908.55	33,202,326	979
Dhaka Division		BD-C	Dhaka	1829	13 Districts: Dhaka, Faridpur, Gazipur, Gopalganj, Kishoreganj, Madaripur, Manikganj, Munshiganj, Narayanganj, Narsingdi, Rajbari, Shariatpur, Tangail	90	885	20,593.74	44,215,107	2,147
Khulna Division		BD-D	Khulna	1960	10 Districts: Bagerhat, Chuadanga, Jashore, Jhenaidah, Khulna, Kushtia, Magura, Meherpur, Narail, Satkhira	59	571	22,284.22	17,416,645	782
Mymensingh Division		BD-H	Mymensingh	2015	4 Districts: Jamalpur, Mymensingh, Netrokona, Sherpur	35	351	10,584.06	12,225,498	1,155
Rajshahi Division		BD-E	Rajshahi	1829	8 Districts: Bogura, Joypurhat, Naogaon, Natore, Chapai Nawabganj, Pabna, Rajshahi, Sirajganj	67	565	18,153.08	20,353,119	1,121
Rangpur Division		BD-F	Rangpur	2010	8 Districts: Dinajpur, Gaibandha, Kurigram, Lalmonirhat, Nilphamari, Panchagarh, Rangpur, Thakurgaon	58	535	16,184.99	17,610,956	1,088
Sylhet Division		BD-G	Sylhet	1996	4 Districts: Habiganj, Moulvibazar, Sunamganj, Sylhet	40	338	12,635.22	11,034,863	873
Bangladesh		BD	Dhaka	1971	64	495	4,546	147,569	165,158,616	1,119

== Proposed divisions ==
Proposed divisions of Bangladesh by Public Administration reform commission

Two more divisions have been proposed to ease down administrative work load due to increase in population: Their formation was confirmed in October 2021 by Prime Minister Sheikh Hasina.

- Comilla Division – proposed to consist of the six northern districts of the current Chittagong Division: Brahmanbaria, Chandpur, Comilla, Feni, Laxmipur, and Noakhali.
- Faridpur Division – proposed to consist of Faridpur, Gopalganj, Madaripur, Rajbari, and Shariatpur districts.

Following the ousting of Sheikh Hasina, on 17 December 2024, the Public Administration Reform Commission of the Interim government of Bangladesh recommended the creation of the Comilla division and Faridpur division, and the integration of Tangail and Kishoreganj district into Mymensingh Division.

According to the commission the proposed divisions are as follows:

Division	Current Districts (in 2025)	Proposed Districts	Changes
Barisal	6 Districts: Barguna, Barishal, Bhola, Jhalokathi, Patuakhali, Pirojpur	6 Districts: Barguna, Barishal, Bhola, Jhalokathi, Patuakhali, Pirojpur	—N/a
Chattogram	11 Districts: Bandarban, Brahmanbaria, Chandpur, Chittagong, Comilla, Cox's Bazar, Feni, Khagrachhari, Lakshmipur, Noakhali, Rangamati	5 Districts: Bandarban, Chittagong, Cox's Bazar, Khagrachhari, Rangamati	6 districts removed and moved to new Comilla Division: Brahmanbaria, Chandpur, Comilla, Feni, Lakshmipur, Noakhali
Dhaka	13 Districts: Dhaka, Faridpur, Gazipur, Gopalganj, Kishoreganj, Madaripur, Manikganj, Munshiganj, Narayanganj, Narsingdi, Rajbari, Shariatpur, Tangail	6 Districts: Dhaka, Gazipur, Manikganj, Munshiganj, Narayanganj, Narsingdi	5 districts removed and moved to new Faridpur Division: Faridpur, Gopalganj, Madaripur, Shariatpur, Rajbari 2 districts removed and moved to Mymensingh Division: Kishoreganj, Tangail
Khulna	10 Districts: Bagerhat, Chuadanga, Jashore, Jhenaidah, Khulna, Kushtia, Magura, Meherpur, Narail, Satkhira	10 Districts: Bagerhat, Chuadanga, Jashore, Jhenaidah, Khulna, Kushtia, Magura, Meherpur, Narail, Satkhira	—N/a
Mymensingh	4 Districts: Jamalpur, Mymensingh, Netrokona, Sherpur	6 Districts: Jamalpur, Kishoreganj, Mymensingh, Netrokona, Sherpur, Tangail	2 districts added from Dhaka Division: Kishoreganj, Tangail
Rajshahi	8 Districts: Bogura, Joypurhat, Naogaon, Natore, Chapai Nawabganj, Pabna, Rajshahi, Sirajganj	8 Districts: Bogura, Joypurhat, Naogaon, Natore, Chapai Nawabganj, Pabna, Rajshahi, Sirajganj	—N/a
Rangpur	8 Districts: Dinajpur, Gaibandha, Kurigram, Lalmonirhat, Nilphamari, Panchagarh, Rangpur, Thakurgaon	8 Districts: Dinajpur, Gaibandha, Kurigram, Lalmonirhat, Nilphamari, Panchagarh, Rangpur, Thakurgaon	—N/a
Sylhet	4 Districts: Habiganj, Moulvibazar, Sunamganj, Sylhet	4 Districts: Habiganj, Moulvibazar, Sunamganj, Sylhet	—N/a
Faridpur	New proposed division	5 Districts: Faridpur, Gopalganj, Madaripur, Shariatpur, Rajbari	5 districts separated from Dhaka Division
Comilla	New proposed division	6 Districts: Brahmanbaria, Chandpur, Comilla, Feni, Lakshmipur, Noakhali	6 districts separated from Chattogram Division

== Evolution of Bangladesh administrative divisions ==
=== Administrative geography ===
East Pakistan inherited 17 districts from British Bengal.

In 1960, Lower Tippera was renamed Comilla.

In 1969, two new districts were created with Tangail separated from Mymensingh and Patuakhali from Bakerganj.

East Pakistan's districts are listed in the following.

East and West Pakistan

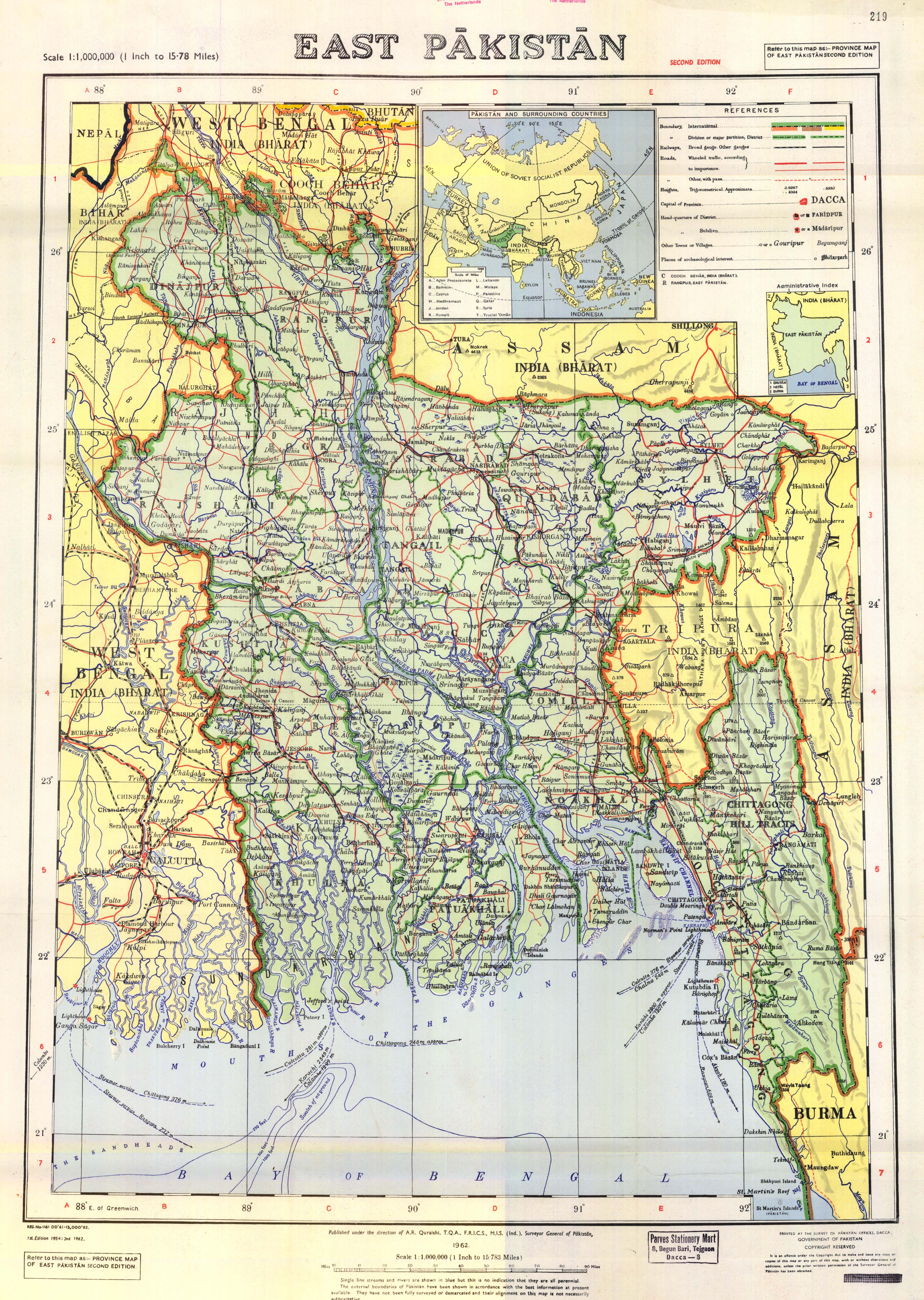
Provincial Map of East Pakistan, 1962

Division	East Pakistani District	Current Bangladeshi Districts
Dacca Division	Dacca District	Dhaka, Narayanganj, Gazipur, Manikganj, Munshiganj, Narsingdi
Dacca Division	Faridpur District	Faridpur, Gopalganj, Rajbari, Shariatpur, Madaripur
Dacca Division	Mymensingh District	Mymensingh, Jamalpur, Kishoreganj, Netrokona, Sherpur
Dacca Division	Tangail District	Tangail
Chittagong Division	Hill Tracts District	Rangamati, Khagrachhari, Bandarban
Chittagong Division	Chittagong District	Chittagong, Cox's Bazar
Chittagong Division	Comilla (Lower Tippera) District	Comilla, Chandpur, Brahmanbaria
Chittagong Division	Noakhali District	Noakhali, Feni, Lakshmipur
Chittagong Division	Sylhet District	Sylhet, Moulvibazar, Habiganj, Sunamganj
Rajshahi Division	Bogra District	Bogra, Joypurhat
Rajshahi Division	Dinajpur District	Dinajpur, Thakurgaon, Panchagarh
Rajshahi Division	Rajshahi District	Rajshahi, Nawabganj, Natore, Naogaon
Rajshahi Division	Rangpur District	Rangpur, Lalmonirhat, Kurigram, Nilphamari, Gaibandha
Rajshahi Division	Pabna District	Pabna, Sirajganj
Khulna Division	Bakerganj District	Barisal, Jhalokati, Pirojpur, Bhola
Khulna Division	Jessore District	Jessore, Jhenaidah, Narail, Magura
Khulna Division	Khulna District	Khulna, Satkhira, Bagerhat
Khulna Division	Kushtia District	Kushtia, Meherpur, Chuadanga
Khulna Division	Patuakhali District	Patuakhali, Barguna

== See also ==
- Tourism in Bangladesh
- List of archaeological sites in Bangladesh
- List of World Heritage Sites in Bangladesh
- Culture of Bangladesh
- ISO 3166 codes
- List of regions of Bangladesh by Human Development Index
- Districts of Bangladesh
- Upazilas of Bangladesh
- Union councils of Bangladesh
- List of cities and towns in Bangladesh
- Villages of Bangladesh
