= ISO 3166-2:AZ =

Entry for Azerbaijan in ISO 3166-2

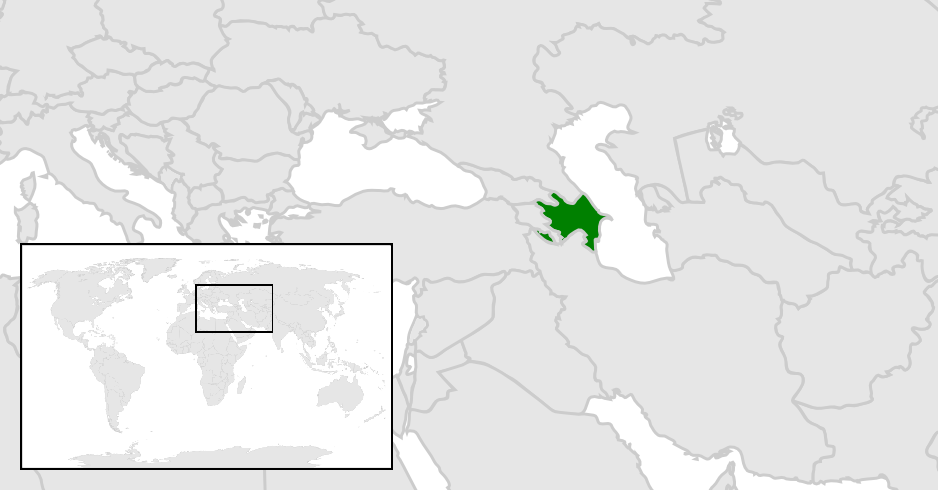
Location of Azerbaijan

ISO 3166-2:AZ is the entry for Azerbaijan in ISO 3166-2, part of the ISO 3166 standard published by the International Organization for Standardization (ISO), which defines codes for the names of the principal subdivisions (e.g., provinces or states) of all countries coded in ISO 3166-1.

Currently for Azerbaijan, ISO 3166-2 codes are defined for two levels of subdivisions:

- one autonomous republic (i.e., Nakhchivan Autonomous Republic)
- 11 municipalities and 66 rayons

The eleven municipalities have special status equal to the rayons. Şuşa, the disputed municipality, has been removed from the list.

Each code consists of two parts, separated by a hyphen. The first part is AZ, the ISO 3166-1 alpha-2 code of Azerbaijan. The second part is either of the following:

- two letters: autonomous republic and municipalities
- three letters: rayons

== Current codes ==
Subdivision names are listed as in the ISO 3166-2 standard published by the ISO 3166 Maintenance Agency (ISO 3166/MA).

Click on the button in the header to sort each column.

=== Autonomous republic ===
Code	Subdivision name (az)	Subdivision name (en) (Note: For reference only, English name not included in the ISO 3166-2 standard.)
AZ-NX	Naxçıvan	Nakhchivan

=== Municipalities and rayons ===
Code	Subdivision name (az)	Subdivision name (en)	Subdivision category	Parent subdivision
AZ-ABS	Abşeron	Absheron	rayon	—
AZ-AGC	Ağcabədi	Aghjabadi	rayon	—
AZ-AGM	Ağdam	Aghdam	rayon	—
AZ-AGS	Ağdaş	Agdash	rayon	—
AZ-AGA	Ağstafa	Aghstafa	rayon	—
AZ-AGU	Ağsu	Aghsu	rayon	—
AZ-AST	Astara	Astara	rayon	—
AZ-BAB	Babək	Babek	rayon	NX
AZ-BA	Bakı	Baku	municipality	—
AZ-BAL	Balakən	Balakan	rayon	—
AZ-BAR	Bərdə	Barda	rayon	—
AZ-BEY	Beyləqan	Beylagan	rayon	—
AZ-BIL	Biləsuvar	Bilasuvar	rayon	—
AZ-CAB	Cəbrayıl	Jabrayil	rayon	—
AZ-CAL	Cəlilabad	Jalilabad	rayon	—
AZ-CUL	Culfa	Julfa	rayon	NX
AZ-DAS	Daşkəsən	Dashkasan	rayon	—
AZ-FUZ	Füzuli	Fuzuli	rayon	—
AZ-GAD	Gədəbəy	Gadabay	rayon	—
AZ-GA	Gəncə	Ganja	municipality	—
AZ-GOR	Goranboy	Goranboy	rayon	—
AZ-GOY	Göyçay	Goychay	rayon	—
AZ-GYG	Göygöl	Goygol	rayon	—
AZ-HAC	Hacıqabul	Hajigabul	rayon	—
AZ-IMI	İmişli	Imishli	rayon	—
AZ-ISM	İsmayıllı	Ismayilli	rayon	—
AZ-KAL	Kəlbəcər	Kalbajar	rayon	—
AZ-KAN	Kǝngǝrli	Kangarli	rayon	NX
AZ-KUR	Kürdəmir	Kurdamir	rayon	—
AZ-LAC	Laçın	Lachin	rayon	—
AZ-LA	Lənkəran	Lankaran City	municipality	—
AZ-LAN	Lənkəran	Lankaran	rayon	—
AZ-LER	Lerik	Lerik	rayon	—
AZ-MAS	Masallı	Masally	rayon	—
AZ-MI	Mingəçevir	Mingachevir	municipality	—
AZ-NA	Naftalan	Naftalan	municipality	—
AZ-NV	Naxçıvan	Nakhchivan City	municipality	NX
AZ-NEF	Neftçala	Neftchala	rayon	—
AZ-OGU	Oğuz	Oghuz	rayon	—
AZ-ORD	Ordubad	Ordubad	rayon	NX
AZ-QAX	Qax	Gakh	rayon	—
AZ-QAZ	Qazax	Gazakh	rayon	—
AZ-QAB	Qəbələ	Gabala	rayon	—
AZ-QOB	Qobustan	Gobustan	rayon	—
AZ-QBA	Quba	Guba	rayon	—
AZ-QBI	Qubadlı	Gubadlı	rayon	—
AZ-QUS	Qusar	Gusar	rayon	—
AZ-SAT	Saatlı	Saatly	rayon	—
AZ-SAB	Sabirabad	Sabirabad	rayon	—
AZ-SBN	Şabran	Shabran	rayon	—
AZ-SAH	Şahbuz	Shahbuz	rayon	NX
AZ-SAL	Salyan	Salyan	rayon	—
AZ-SMI	Şamaxı	Shamakhi	rayon	—
AZ-SMX	Samux	Samukh	rayon	—
AZ-SAD	Sədərək	Sadarak	rayon	NX
AZ-SA	Şəki	Shaki City	municipality	—
AZ-SAK	Şəki	Shaki	rayon	—
AZ-SKR	Şəmkir	Shamkir	rayon	—
AZ-SAR	Şərur	Sharur	rayon	NX
AZ-SR	Şirvan	Shirvan	municipality	—
AZ-SIY	Siyəzən	Siyazan	rayon	—
AZ-SM	Sumqayıt	Sumgayit	municipality	—
AZ-SUS	Şuşa	Shusha	rayon	—
AZ-TAR	Tərtər	Tartar	rayon	—
AZ-TOV	Tovuz	Tovuz	rayon	—
AZ-UCA	Ucar	Ujar	rayon	—
AZ-XAC	Xaçmaz	Khachmaz	rayon	—
AZ-XA	Xankəndi	Khankendi	municipality	—
AZ-XIZ	Xızı	Khizi	rayon	—
AZ-XCI	Xocalı	Khojaly	rayon	—
AZ-XVD	Xocavənd	Khojavend	rayon	—
AZ-YAR	Yardımlı	Yardimli	rayon	—
AZ-YE	Yevlax	Yevlakh City	municipality	—
AZ-YEV	Yevlax	Yevlakh	rayon	—
AZ-ZAQ	Zaqatala	Zagatala	rayon	—
AZ-ZAN	Zəngilan	Zangilan	rayon	—
AZ-ZAR	Zərdab	Zardab	rayon	—

== Changes ==
The following changes to the entry have been announced in newsletters by the ISO 3166/MA since the first publication of ISO 3166-2 in 1998. ISO stopped issuing newsletters in 2013.

Newsletter	Date issued	Description of change in newsletter	Code/Subdivision change
Newsletter I-2	2002-05-21	Correction of one code and four spelling errors. Notification of the rayons belonging to the autonomous republic	Codes: Naxçıvan: AZ-MM → AZ-NX
Newsletter II-3	2011-12-13 (corrected 2011-12-15)	Alphabetical re-ordering, name change of administrative places, first level prefix addition and source list update	Subdivisions added: AZ-KAN Kǝngǝrli; AZ-NV Naxçıvan (municipality); Subdivisions deleted: AZ-SS Şuşa; Codes: AZ-AB Əli Bayramlı → AZ-SR Şirvan; AZ-DAV Dəvəçi → AZ-SBN Şabran; AZ-XAN Xanlar → AZ-GYG Göygöl

The following changes to the entry are listed on ISO's online catalogue, the Online Browsing Platform:

Effective date of change	Short description of change (en)
2015-11-27	Deletion of the romanization system; update List Source

== See also ==
- Subdivisions of Azerbaijan
- FIPS region codes of Azerbaijan
- Neighbouring countries: AM, GE, IR, RU, TR
