= ISO 3166-2:IQ =

Entry for Iraq in ISO 3166-2

ISO 3166-2:IQ is the entry for Iraq in ISO 3166-2, part of the ISO 3166 standard published by the International Organization for Standardization (ISO), which defines codes for the names of the principal subdivisions (e.g., provinces or states) of all countries coded in ISO 3166-1.

Currently for Iraq, ISO 3166-2 codes are defined for 18 governorates and one region.

Each code consists of two parts, separated by a hyphen. The first part is IQ, the ISO 3166-1 alpha-2 code of Iraq. The second part is two letters.

== Current codes ==
Subdivision names are listed as in the ISO 3166-2 standard published by the ISO 3166 Maintenance Agency (ISO 3166/MA).

Code	Subdivision name (ar) (BGN/PCGN 1956)	Subdivision name (ar) (Note: For reference only, Arabic name in Arabic script not included in the ISO 3166-2 standard.)	Subdivision name (ku) (BGN/PCGN 2007)	Subdivision name (ku) (Note: For reference only, Kurdish name in Kurdish script not included in the ISO 3166-2 standard.)	Subdivision name (en) (Note: For reference only, English name not included in the ISO 3166-2 standard.)	Subdivision category	Parent subdiv.
IQ-AN	Al Anbār	الأنبار			Anbar	governorate	
IQ-BA	Al Başrah	البصرة			Basra	governorate	
IQ-MU	Al Muthanná	المثنى			Muthanna	governorate	
IQ-QA	Al Qādisīyah	القادسية			Qadisiya	governorate	
IQ-NA	An Najaf	النجف			Najaf	governorate	
IQ-AR	Arbīl	أربيل	Hewlêr	ھەولێر	Erbil	governorate	KR
IQ-SU	As Sulaymānīyah	السليمانية	Slêmanî	سلێمانی	Sulaymaniya	governorate	KR
IQ-BB	Bābil	بابل			Babylon	governorate	
IQ-BG	Baghdād	بغداد			Baghdad	governorate	
IQ-DA	Dahūk	دهوك	Dihok	دھۆک	Duhok	governorate	KR
IQ-DQ	Dhī Qār	ذي قار			Dhi Qar	governorate	
IQ-DI	Diyālá	ديالى			Diyala	governorate	
IQ-KR	Iqlīm Kūrdistān	کوردستان	Herêm-î Kurdistan	كوردستان	Kurdistan	region	
IQ-KA	Karbalā’	كربلاء			Karbala	governorate	
IQ-KI	Kirkūk	كركوك		کەرکووک	Kirkuk	governorate	
IQ-MA	Maysān	ميسان			Maysan	governorate	
IQ-NI	Nīnawá	نينوى			Nineveh	governorate	
IQ-SD	Şalāḩ ad Dīn	صلاح الدين			Saladin	governorate	
IQ-WA	Wāsiţ	واسط			Wasit	governorate	

== Changes ==
The following changes to the entry are listed on ISO's online catalogue, the Online Browsing Platform:

Effective date of change	Short description of change (en)
2022-03-03	Addition of category region in eng, fra, ara, kur; Addition of region IQ-KR; Assign parent subdivision to IQ-AR, IQ-DA, IQ-SU; Update List and Code Source

== See also ==
- Subdivisions of Iraq
- FIPS region codes of Iraq
- Neighbouring countries: IR, JO, KW, SA, SY, TR
