= ISO 3166-2:KH =

Entry for Cambodia in ISO 3166-2

ISO 3166-2:KH is the entry for Cambodia in ISO 3166-2, part of the ISO 3166 standard published by the International Organization for Standardization (ISO), which defines codes for the names of the principal subdivisions (e.g., provinces or states) of all countries coded in ISO 3166-1.

Currently for Cambodia, ISO 3166-2 codes are defined for one autonomous municipality and 24 provinces.

Each code consists of two parts, separated by a hyphen. The first part is KH, the ISO 3166-1 alpha-2 code of Cambodia. The second part is a number. The digits are currently used in postal codes, except for codes 1-9, for which one must include 0 before the number (1 becomes 01) to get the postal code from the ISO code:

- 1–21: autonomous municipalities and provinces as of late 1980s
- 22–25: autonomous municipalities and province created since the 1990s

== Current codes ==
Subdivision names are listed as in the ISO 3166-2 standard published by the ISO 3166 Maintenance Agency (ISO 3166/MA).

Click on the button in the header to sort each column.

Code	Subdivision name (km) (National draft 1997)	Subdivision name (km) (BGN/PCGN 1972)	Subdivision name (km) (Note: For reference only, Khmer name in Khmer script not included in the ISO 3166-2 standard.)	Local variant	Subdivision category
KH-2	Baat Dambang	Bătdâmbâng	បាត់ដំបង	Battambang	province
KH-1	Banteay Mean Choăy	Bântéay Méan Choăy	បន្ទាយមានជ័យ	Banteay Meanchey	province
KH-23	Kaeb	Kêb	ខេត្តកែប	Kep	province
KH-3	Kampong Chaam	Kâmpóng Cham	កំពង់ចាម	Kampong Cham	province
KH-4	Kampong Chhnang	Kâmpóng Chhnăng	កំពង់ឆ្នាំង		province
KH-5	Kampong Spueu	Kâmpóng Spœ	កំពង់ស្ពឺ	Kampong Speu	province
KH-6	Kampong Thum	Kâmpóng Thum	កំពង់ធំ	Kampong Thom	province
KH-7	Kampot	Kâmpôt	កំពត		province
KH-8	Kandaal	Kândal	កណ្ដាល	Kandal	province
KH-9	Kaoh Kong	Kaôh Kŏng	កោះកុង	Koh Kong	province
KH-10	Kracheh	Krâchéh	ក្រចេះ	Kratie	province
KH-11	Mondol Kiri	Môndól Kiri	មណ្ឌលគិរី	Mondolkiri	province
KH-22	Otdar Mean Chey	Ŏtdâr Méan Choăy	ឧត្តរមានជ័យ	Oddar Meanchey	province
KH-24	Pailin	Pailĭn	ប៉ៃលិន		province
KH-12	Phnom Penh	Phnum Pénh	ភ្នំពេញ		autonomous municipality
KH-15	Pousaat	Poŭthĭsăt	ពោធិ៍សាត់	Pursat	province
KH-18	Preah Sihanouk	Preăh Seihânŭ	ព្រះសីហនុ	Sihanoukville	province
KH-13	Preah Vihear	Preăh Vihéar	ព្រះវិហារ		province
KH-14	Prey Veaeng	Prey Vêng	ព្រៃវែង	Prey Veng	province
KH-16	Rotanak Kiri	Rôtânôkiri	រតនគិរី	Ratanakiri	province
KH-17	Siem Reab	Siĕmréab	សៀមរាប	Siem Reap	province
KH-19	Stueng Traeng	Stoĕng Trêng	ស្ទឹងត្រែង	Stung Treng	province
KH-20	Svaay Rieng	Svay Riĕng	ស្វាយរៀង	Svay Rieng	province
KH-21	Taakaev	Takêv	តាកែវ	Takeo	province
KH-25	Tbong Khmum	Tbong Khmŭm	ត្បូងឃ្មុំ		province

== Changes ==
The following changes to the entry have been announced by the ISO 3166/MA since the first publication of ISO 3166-2 in 1998. ISO stopped issuing newsletters in 2013.

Newsletter	Date issued	Description of change in newsletter	Code/Subdivision change
Newsletter I-4	2002-12-10	Addition of one autonomous municipality	Subdivisions added: KH-24 Krong Pailin
Online Browsing; Platform (OBP)	2014-11-03	Update List Source	
Online Browsing; Platform (OBP)	2015-11-27	Change of subdivision category from autonomous municipalities to provinces for KH-18, KH-23, KH-24; addition of province KH-25, update List Source	Category changes: KH-18, KH-23, KH-24 autonomous municipality → province Subdivision added: KH-25
Online Browsing; Platform (OBP)	2016-11-15	Change of spelling of KH-25	
Online Browsing; Platform (OBP)	2018-11-26	Change of subdivision name of KH-18, KH-23, KH24; Correction of the romanization system label; Addition of local variation of KH-01, KH-02, KH-03, KH-05, KH-06, KH-08, KH-09, KH-10, KH-11, KH-14, KH-15, KH-16, KH-17, KH-18, KH-19, KH-20, KH-21, KH-22, KH-23	Name changes: KH-18, KH-23, KH-24; Local variations added: KH-01, KH-02, KH-03, KH-05, KH-06, KH-08, KH-09, KH-10, KH-11, KH-14, KH-15, KH-16, KH-17, KH-18, KH-19, KH-20, KH-21, KH-22, KH-23
Online Browsing; Platform (OBP)	2020-11-24	Correction of spelling of KH-22, KH-1, KH-18	Name changes: KH-1, KH-18, KH-22
Online Browsing; Platform (OBP)	2021-11-25	Change of spelling of KH-1	Name changes: KH-1

== See also ==
- Subdivisions of Cambodia
- FIPS region codes of Cambodia
- Neighbouring countries: LA, TH, VN
