= ISO 3166-2:LA =

Entry for Laos in ISO 3166-2

ISO 3166-2:LA is the entry for Laos in ISO 3166-2, part of the ISO 3166 standard published by the International Organization for Standardization (ISO), which defines codes for the names of the principal subdivisions (e.g., provinces or states) of all countries coded in ISO 3166-1.

Currently for Laos, ISO 3166-2 codes are defined for one prefecture and 17 provinces.

Each code consists of two parts separated by a hyphen. The first part is LA, the ISO 3166-1 alpha-2 code of Laos. The second part is two letters.

== Current codes ==
Subdivision names are listed as in the ISO 3166-2 standard published by the ISO 3166 Maintenance Agency (ISO 3166/MA).

Click on the button in the header to sort each column.

Code	Subdivision name (lo) (LAO CNT 1965)	Subdivision name (lo) (Note: For reference only, Lao name in Lao script not included in the ISO 3166-2 standard.)	Local variant	Subdivision category
LA-AT	Attapu	ອັດຕະປື	Attapeu	province
LA-BK	Bokèo	ບໍ່ແກ້ວ		province
LA-BL	Bolikhamxai	ບໍລິຄໍາໄຊ	Borikhamxay	province
LA-CH	Champasak	ຈຳປາສັກ	Champasack	province
LA-HO	Houaphan	ຫົວພັນ	Huaphanh	province
LA-KH	Khammouan	ຄໍາມ່ວນ	Khammuane	province
LA-LM	Louang Namtha	ຫລວງນໍ້າທາ	Luangnamtha	province
LA-LP	Louangphabang	ຫລວງພະບາງ	Luangprabang	province
LA-OU	Oudômxai	ອຸດົມໄຊ	Oudomxay	province
LA-PH	Phôngsali	ຜົ້ງສາລີ	Phongsaly	province
LA-SL	Salavan	ສາລະວັນ	Saravane	province
LA-SV	Savannakhét	ສະຫວັນນະເຂດ	Savannakhet	province
LA-VI	Viangchan	ວຽງຈັນ	Vientiane	province
LA-VT	Viangchan	ວຽງຈັນ	Vientiane	prefecture
LA-XA	Xaignabouli	ໄຊຍະບູລີ	Xayabury	province
LA-XS	Xaisômboun	ໄຊສົມບູນ	Xaysomboon	province
LA-XE	Xékong	ເຊກອງ	Sekong	province
LA-XI	Xiangkhouang	ຊຽງຂວາງ	Xiengkhuang	province

== Changes ==
The following changes to the entry have been announced in newsletters by the ISO 3166/MA since the first publication of ISO 3166-2 in 1998:

Newsletter	Date issued	Description of change in newsletter	Code/Subdivision change
Newsletter I-2	2002-05-21	One new province added. One new reference for the list source. One code source cancelled. Information on romanization system updated. Origin of names in brackets given	Subdivisions added: LA-XN Xaisômboun
Newsletter I-4	2002-12-10	Error correction: Generic name of one subdivision changed to "special zone"	

== See also ==
- Subdivisions of Laos
- FIPS region codes of Laos
- Neighbouring countries: CN, KH, MM, TH, VN
