= ISO 3166-2:MM =

Entry for Myanmar in ISO 3166-2

ISO 3166-2:MM is the entry for Myanmar in ISO 3166-2, part of the ISO 3166 standard published by the International Organization for Standardization (ISO), which defines codes for the names of the principal subdivisions (e.g., provinces or states) of all countries coded in ISO 3166-1.

As of 2020, Myanmar ISO 3166-2 codes are defined for seven regions, seven states, and one union territory.

Each code consists of two parts separated by a hyphen. The first part is MM, the ISO 3166-1 alpha-2 code of Myanmar. The second part is two digits:

- 01–07: regions
- 11–17: states
- 18: union territory

== Current codes ==
Subdivision names are listed as in the ISO 3166-2 standard published by the ISO 3166 Maintenance Agency (ISO 3166/MA).

Click on the button in the header to sort each column.

Code	Subdivision name (my) (conventional names)	Subdivision name (my) (Note: For reference only, Burmese name in Burmese script not included in the ISO 3166-2 standard.)	Subdivision category
MM-07	Ayeyarwady	ဧရာဝတီတိုင်းဒေသကြီး	region
MM-02	Bago	ပဲခူးတိုင်းဒေသကြီး	region
MM-14	Chin	ချင်းပြည်နယ်	state
MM-11	Kachin	ကချင်ပြည်နယ်	state
MM-12	Kayah	ကယားပြည်နယ်	state
MM-13	Kayin	ကရင်ပြည်နယ်	state
MM-03	Magway	မကွေးတိုင်းဒေသကြီး	region
MM-04	Mandalay	မန္တလေးတိုင်းဒေသကြီး	region
MM-15	Mon	မွန်ပြည်နယ်	state
MM-18	Nay Pyi Taw	ပြည်‌ထောင်စုနယ်မြေ နေပြည်တော်	union territory
MM-16	Rakhine	ရခိုင်ပြည်နယ်	state
MM-01	Sagaing	စစ်ကိုင်းတိုင်းဒေသကြီး	region
MM-17	Shan	သျှမ်းပြည်နယ်	state
MM-05	Tanintharyi	တနင်္သာရီတိုင်းဒေသကြီး	region
MM-06	Yangon	ရန်ကုန်တိုင်းဒေသကြီး	region

== Changes ==
The following changes to the entry have been announced in newsletters by the ISO 3166/MA since the first publication of ISO 3166-2 in 1998:

Newsletter	Date issued	Description of change in newsletter
Newsletter II-3	2011-12-13 (corrected 2011-12-15)	Addition of local generic administrative terms, source list update and addition of a comment.

== See also ==
- Subdivisions of Myanmar
- FIPS region codes of Myanmar
- Neighbouring countries: BD, CN, IN, LA, TH
