= Governorates of Iraq =

Second-level administrative divisions of Iraq

Governorates of Iraq المحافظات العراقية (Arabic) پارێزگاکانی عێراق (Kurdish)
- Also known as: Muḥāfażah
- Clickable map of Iraq exhibiting its eighteen governorates, and partially recognized Halabja. A clickable map of Iraq exhibiting its governorates.
- Category: Federated state
- Location: Republic of Iraq
- Number: 19 governorates
- Areas: 204 km^{2} (78.8 sq mi) (Baghdad) – 138,500 km^{2} (53,476 sq mi) (Al Anbar)
- Government: Governorate
- Subdivisions: Districts

Iraq consists of 19 governorates (Arabic: محافظة, romanized: muḥāfażah; Kurdish: پارێزگا, romanized: parêzgeh), also known as "provinces". Per the Iraqi constitution, governorates can form a federal region. Four governorates, Erbil, Sulaymaniyah, Halabja and Duhok, constitute the semi-autonomous Kurdistan Region. Baghdad (which is the most populous) and Basra are the oldest governorates. The second most-populous one, Ninawa (or Nineveh) is in the upland region and has a cooler climate of the north-west.

On 27 April 2025, Baghdad Today reported of an ongoing government initiative to convert Tel Afar District in Nineveh Governorate into the 20th governorate of Iraq. The proposed name of the new governorate is Jazira.

== History ==
Throughout early 2014, the Council of Ministers of Iraq approved proposals to add the three newly proposed governorates:

- Tal Afar, from part of Nineveh Governorate
- Tuz Khurmatu, from part of Saladin Governorate
- Nineveh Plains from the Nineveh Governorate.
- Halabja from Sulaymaniah Governorate

In 2013, activists and political parties called for the conversion of Hawija from a District into a governorate, but the Kirkuk government blocked the proposal.

Shortly after the approval of the proposals, the Islamic State attacked the cities, towns and villages of the Nineveh Plains. Upon the eventual withdrawal of ISIS, the initial decision by the Council of Ministers was dishonored by Kurdistan, Baghdad and Iranian-connected political entities, as they began pushing security forces into different parts of the Nineveh Plains to try to lay claim to different parts of the territory, asserting that the demographics had changed due to ISIS and that the original inhabitants could no longer be representatives of their indigenous land. Part of the reason for the demographic shift was that squatters were encouraged to occupy Christian homes. Without enough paperwork to prove ownership, some of those homes became extremely challenging to reclaim. Initiatives are underway to help reclaim families' homes.

Another proposal exists to add a 19th governorate: Fallujah, from part of Al Anbar Governorate. This largely did not occur due to the ISIS insurgency. Following the defeat of ISIS in the Battle of Fallujah (2016), the proposal may resurface or Al-Anbar may remain undivided.

There had been numerous calls to recognize Halabja Governorate since 1999. It was recognized as an official governorate of the Kurdistan Region in 2014, and the Council of Ministers approved a bill twice in 2013, and 2023. The Council of Representatives of Iraq officially approved Halabja as Iraq's 19th governorate on 14 April 2025.

== List of governorates ==
Governorates of Iraq
Governorate	Postal code	ISO code	Total area in square miles	Total area in km^{2}	Population 1 July 2018	Population Density in square miles	Population Density in km^{2}	Capital
Al-Anbar	31	AN	53,476	138,501	1,771,656	29.1	11.2	Ramadi
Babil	51	BB	1,976	5,603	2,065,042	921.4	324.9	Hillah
Baghdad	10	BG	78.8	204.2	8,126,755	103,131.4	39,798	Baghdad
Basra	61	BA	7,360	19,070	2,908,491	344.0	132.7	Basra
Dhi Qar	64	DQ	5,000	12,900	2,095,172	367.2	142.3	Nasiriyah
Al-Qadisiyyah	58	QA	3,148	8,153	1,291,048	360.3	139.1	Al Diwaniyah
Diyala	32	DI	6,828	17,685	1,637,226	211.3	81.6	Baqubah
Duhok	42	DA	2,530	6,553	1,292,535	445.5	172.2	Duhok
Erbil	44	AR	5,820	15,074	1,854,778	277.0	106.9	Erbil
Karbala	56	KA	1,944	5,034	1,218,732	548.6	211.8	Karbala
Kirkuk	36	KI	3,737	9,679	1,597,876	373.4	144.1	Kirkuk
Maysan	62	MA	6,205	16,072	1,112,673	156.5	60.4	Amarah
Muthanna	66	MU	19,980	51,740	814,371	35.9	13.8	Samawah
Najaf	54	NA	11,129	28,824	1,471,592	115.5	44.5	Najaf
Nineveh	41	NI	14,410	37,323	3,729,998	226.9	87.6	Mosul
Salah Al-Din	34	SD	9,556	24,751	1,595,235	147.3	56.8	Tikrit
Sulaymaniyah	46	SU	6,573	17,023	2,053,305	285.8	110.3	Sulaymaniyah
Wasit	52	WA	6,623	17,153	1,378,723	182.7	70.5	Kut
Halabja			343	889	140,000	408.2	157.5	Halabja

== Former governorates ==
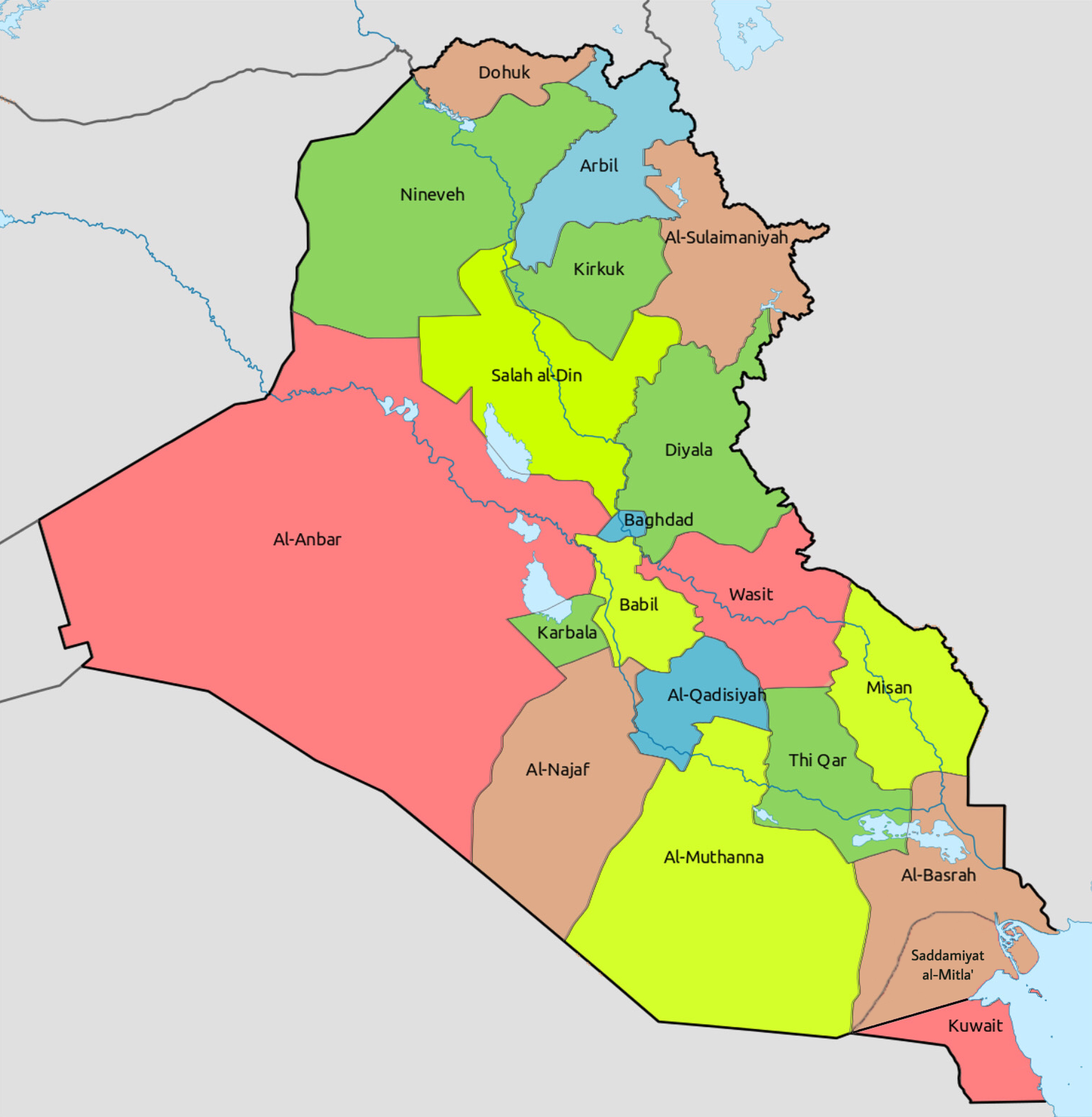
Iraqi governorates in 1990

Governorate	Today part of
Mosul	Ninawa Governorate; Duhok Governorate
Diwaniya	Al-Qādisiyyah Governorate; Muthanna Governorate; Najaf Governorate
Dulaim (−1962); Ramadi (1962–1976)	Al Anbar Governorate
Muntafiq (−1976)	Dhi Qar Governorate
Amara (−1976)	Maysan Governorate
Kut (−1976)	Wasit Governorate
Baghdad	Baghdad Governorate; Saladin Governorate
Kirkuk (−1976); At-Ta'mim (1976–2006)	Kirkuk Governorate
Kuwait Governorate (Military occupation between 1990 and 1991)	State of Kuwait

== See also ==
- Federal regions of Iraq
- Districts of Iraq
- ISO 3166-2:IQ
- List of Governorates of Iraq by Human Development Index
- List of places in Iraq
