= ISO 3166-2:GE =

Entry for Georgia in ISO 3166-2

ISO 3166-2:GE is the entry for Georgia in ISO 3166-2, part of the ISO 3166 standard published by the International Organization for Standardization (ISO), which defines codes for the names of the principal subdivisions (e.g., provinces or states) of all countries coded in ISO 3166-1.

Currently for Georgia, ISO 3166-2 codes are defined for two autonomous republics, one city and nine regions. The city Tbilisi is the capital of the country and has special status equal to the regions.

Each code consists of two parts, separated by a hyphen. The first part is GE, the ISO 3166-1 alpha-2 code of Georgia. The second part is two letters.

== Current codes ==
Subdivision names are listed as in the ISO 3166-2 standard published by the ISO 3166 Maintenance Agency (ISO 3166/MA).

Click on the button in the header to sort each column.

Code	Subdivision name (ka) (National draft 2002)	Local variant	Subdivision name (ka) (Note: For reference only, Georgian name in Georgian script not included in the ISO 3166-2 standard.)	Subdivision category
GE-AB	Abkhazia	Apkhazeti	აფხაზეთი	autonomous republic
GE-AJ	Adjara	Ach'ara	აჭარა	autonomous republic
GE-GU	Guria		გურია	region
GE-IM	Imereti		იმერეთი	region
GE-KA	K'akheti		კახეთი	region
GE-KK	Kvemo Kartli		ქვემო ქართლი	region
GE-MM	Mtskheta-Mtianeti		მცხეთა-მთიანეთი	region
GE-RL	Rach'a-Lechkhumi-Kvemo Svaneti		რაჭა-ლეჩხუმი და ქვემო სვანეთი	region
GE-SZ	Samegrelo-Zemo Svaneti		სამეგრელო-ზემო სვანეთი	region
GE-SJ	Samtskhe-Javakheti		სამცხე-ჯავახეთი	region
GE-SK	Shida Kartli		შიდა ქართლი	region
GE-TB	Tbilisi		თბილისი	city

== Changes ==
The following changes to the entry have been announced in newsletters by the ISO 3166/MA since the first publication of ISO 3166-2 in 1998:

Newsletter	Date issued	Description of change in newsletter	Code/Subdivision change
Newsletter I-2	2002-05-21	New subdivision layout. City level cancelled. Spelling of autonomous republics' names changed. One generic subdivision name changed	Subdivision layout: 2 autonomous republics, 13 cities, 63 rayons (see below) → 2 autonomous republics, 10 regions
Newsletter I-4	2002-12-10	Introduction of third subdivision category	
Newsletter I-9	2007-11-28	Addition of diacritical signs	

=== Codes before Newsletter I-2 ===
Former code	Subdivision name	Subdivision category
GE-AB	Apkhazetis Avtonomiuri Respublika [Abkhazia]	autonomous republic
GE-AJ	Acharis Avtonomiuri Respublika [Ajaria]	autonomous republic

Former code	Subdivision name	Subdivision category	In autonomous republic
GE-BUS	Batumi	city	AJ
GE-CHI	Chiat'ura	city territory (now municipality)	—
GE-GAG	Gagra	city territory (now municipality)	AB
GE-GOR	Gori	city	—
GE-KUT	Kutaisi	city	—
GE-PTI	Poti	city	—
GE-RUS	Rustavi	city	—
GE-SUI	Sokhumi	city (now part of Sokhumi Municipality)	AB
GE-TBS	T'bilisi	city	—
GE-TQI	Tqibuli	city territory (now municipality)	—
GE-TQV	Tqvarcheli	city	AB
GE-TSQ	Tsqaltubo	city territory (now municipality)	—
GE-ZUG	Zugdidi	city city (now part of Zugdidi Municipality)	—
GE-01	Abashis Raioni	rayon (now municipality)	—
GE-02	Adigenis Raioni	rayon (now municipality)	—
GE-03	Akhalgoris Raioni	rayon (now municipality)	—
GE-04	Akhalk'alak'is Raioni	rayon (now municipality)	—
GE-05	Akhalts'ikhis Raioni	rayon (now municipality)	—
GE-06	Akhmetis Raioni	rayon (now municipality)	—
GE-07	Ambrolauris Raioni	rayon (now municipality)	—
GE-08	Aspindzis Raioni	rayon (now municipality)	—
GE-09	Baghdat'is Raioni	rayon (now municipality)	—
GE-10	Bolnisis Raioni	rayon (now municipality)	—
GE-11	Borjomis Raioni	rayon (now municipality)	—
GE-12	Ch'khorotsqus Raioni	rayon (now municipality)	—
GE-13	Ch'okhatauris Raioni	rayon	—
GE-14	Dedop'listsqaros Raioni	rayon (now municipality)	—
GE-15	Dmanisis Raioni	rayon (now municipality)	—
GE-16	Dushet'is Raioni	rayon (now municipality)	—
GE-17	Galis Raioni	rayon (now municipality)	AB
GE-18	Gardabnis Raioni	rayon (now municipality)	—
GE-19	Goris Raioni	rayon (now municipality)	—
GE-20	Gudauta District	rayon	AB
GE-21	Gulripshi District	rayon	AB
GE-22	Gurjaanis Raioni	rayon	—
GE-23	Javis Raioni	rayon	—
GE-24	K'arelis Raioni	rayon	—
GE-25	Kaspis Raioni	rayon	—
GE-26	K'edis Raioni	rayon	AJ
GE-27	Kharagaulis Raioni	rayon	—
GE-28	Khashuris Raioni	rayon	—
GE-29	Khelvach'auris Raioni	rayon	AJ
GE-30	Khobis Raioni	rayon	—
GE-31	Khonis Raioni	rayon	—
GE-32	Khulos Raioni	rayon	AJ
GE-33	K'obuletis Raioni	rayon	AJ
GE-34	Lagodekhis Raioni	rayon	—
GE-35	Lanch'khut'is Raioni	rayon	—
GE-36	Lentekhis Raioni	rayon	—
GE-37	Marneulis Raioni	rayon	—
GE-38	Martvilis Raioni	rayon	—
GE-39	Mestiis Raioni	rayon	—
GE-40	Mts'khet'is Raioni	rayon	—
GE-41	Ninotsmindis Raioni	rayon	—
GE-42	Och'amch'iris Raioni	rayon	AB
GE-43	Onis Raioni	rayon	—
GE-44	Ozurget'is Raioni	rayon	—
GE-45	Qazbegis Raioni	rayon	—
GE-46	Qvarlis Raioni	rayon	—
GE-47	Sach'kheris Raioni	rayon	—
GE-48	Sagarejos Raioni	rayon	—
GE-49	Samtrediis Raioni	rayon	—
GE-50	Senakis Raioni	rayon	—
GE-51	Shuakhevis Raioni	rayon	AJ
GE-52	Sighnaghis Raioni	rayon	—
GE-53	Sukhumi District	rayon	AB
GE-54	T'elavis Raioni	rayon	—
GE-55	T'erjolis Raioni	rayon	—
GE-56	T'et'ritsqaros Raioni	rayon	—
GE-57	T'ianet'is Raioni	rayon	—
GE-58	Ts'ageris Raioni	rayon	—
GE-59	Tsalenjikhis Raioni	rayon	—
GE-60	Tsalkis Raioni	rayon	—
GE-61	Vanis Raioni	rayon	—
GE-62	Zestap'onis Raioni	rayon	—
GE-63	Zugdidis Raioni	rayon	—

== See also ==
- Subdivisions of Georgia
- FIPS region codes of Georgia
- Neighbouring countries: AM, AZ, RU, TR
