= ISO 3166-2:TH =

Entry for Thailand in ISO 3166-2

ISO 3166-2:TH is the entry for Thailand in ISO 3166-2, part of the ISO 3166 standard published by the International Organization for Standardization (ISO), which defines codes for the names of the principal subdivisions (e.g., provinces or states) of all countries coded in ISO 3166-1.

Currently for Thailand, ISO 3166-2 codes are defined for one metropolitan administration, one special administrative city and 76 provinces. The metropolitan administration Bangkok is the capital of the country and has special status equal to the provinces. The special administrative city Pattaya is a self-governing city in Chonburi province.

Each code consists of two parts separated by a hyphen. The first part is TH, the ISO 3166-1 alpha-2 code of Thailand. The second part is two digits, except Pattaya which uses a letter:

- leading digits 1, 2, 6, 7: Central Thailand
- leading digits 3, 4: Northeastern Thailand
- leading digit 5: Northern Thailand
- leading digits 8, 9: Southern Thailand
- S: Pattaya

ISO 3166-2:TH follows the Thai standard TIS 1099, which in turn follows codes assigned by the Ministry of Interior.

== Current codes ==
Subdivision names are listed as in the ISO 3166-2 standard published by the ISO 3166 Maintenance Agency (ISO 3166/MA).

Click on the button in the header to sort each column.

Code	Subdivision name (th) (National 2000 = ISO 11940-2:2007 = UN VIII/12 2002)	Subdivision name (th) (Note: For reference only, Thai name in Thai script not included in the ISO 3166-2 standard.)	Subdivision category
TH-37	Amnat Charoen	อำนาจเจริญ	province
TH-15	Ang Thong	อ่างทอง	province
TH-38	Bueng Kan	บึงกาฬ	province
TH-31	Buri Ram	บุรีรัมย์	province
TH-24	Chachoengsao	ฉะเชิงเทรา	province
TH-18	Chai Nat	ชัยนาท	province
TH-36	Chaiyaphum	ชัยภูมิ	province
TH-22	Chanthaburi	จันทบุรี	province
TH-50	Chiang Mai	เชียงใหม่	province
TH-57	Chiang Rai	เชียงราย	province
TH-20	Chon Buri	ชลบุรี	province
TH-86	Chumphon	ชุมพร	province
TH-46	Kalasin	กาฬสินธุ์	province
TH-62	Kamphaeng Phet	กำแพงเพชร	province
TH-71	Kanchanaburi	กาญจนบุรี	province
TH-40	Khon Kaen	ขอนแก่น	province
TH-81	Krabi	กระบี่	province
TH-10	Krung Thep Maha Nakhon (local variant: Bangkok)	กรุงเทพมหานคร	metropolitan administration
TH-52	Lampang	ลำปาง	province
TH-51	Lamphun	ลำพูน	province
TH-42	Loei	เลย	province
TH-16	Lop Buri	ลพบุรี	province
TH-58	Mae Hong Son	แม่ฮ่องสอน	province
TH-44	Maha Sarakham	มหาสารคาม	province
TH-49	Mukdahan	มุกดาหาร	province
TH-26	Nakhon Nayok	นครนายก	province
TH-73	Nakhon Pathom	นครปฐม	province
TH-48	Nakhon Phanom	นครพนม	province
TH-30	Nakhon Ratchasima	นครราชสีมา	province
TH-60	Nakhon Sawan	นครสวรรค์	province
TH-80	Nakhon Si Thammarat	นครศรีธรรมราช	province
TH-55	Nan	น่าน	province
TH-96	Narathiwat	นราธิวาส	province
TH-39	Nong Bua Lam Phu	หนองบัวลำภู	province
TH-43	Nong Khai	หนองคาย	province
TH-12	Nonthaburi	นนทบุรี	province
TH-13	Pathum Thani	ปทุมธานี	province
TH-94	Pattani	ปัตตานี	province
TH-82	Phangnga	พังงา	province
TH-93	Phatthalung	พัทลุง	province
TH-S	Phatthaya	พัทยา	special administrative city
TH-56	Phayao	พะเยา	province
TH-67	Phetchabun	เพชรบูรณ์	province
TH-76	Phetchaburi	เพชรบุรี	province
TH-66	Phichit	พิจิตร	province
TH-65	Phitsanulok	พิษณุโลก	province
TH-14	Phra Nakhon Si Ayutthaya	พระนครศรีอยุธยา	province
TH-54	Phrae	แพร่	province
TH-83	Phuket	ภูเก็ต	province
TH-25	Prachin Buri	ปราจีนบุรี	province
TH-77	Prachuap Khiri Khan	ประจวบคีรีขันธ์	province
TH-85	Ranong	ระนอง	province
TH-70	Ratchaburi	ราชบุรี	province
TH-21	Rayong	ระยอง	province
TH-45	Roi Et	ร้อยเอ็ด	province
TH-27	Sa Kaeo	สระแก้ว	province
TH-47	Sakon Nakhon	สกลนคร	province
TH-11	Samut Prakan	สมุทรปราการ	province
TH-74	Samut Sakhon	สมุทรสาคร	province
TH-75	Samut Songkhram	สมุทรสงคราม	province
TH-19	Saraburi	สระบุรี	province
TH-91	Satun	สตูล	province
TH-33	Si Sa Ket	ศรีสะเกษ	province
TH-17	Sing Buri	สิงห์บุรี	province
TH-90	Songkhla	สงขลา	province
TH-64	Sukhothai	สุโขทัย	province
TH-72	Suphan Buri	สุพรรณบุรี	province
TH-84	Surat Thani	สุราษฎร์ธานี	province
TH-32	Surin	สุรินทร์	province
TH-63	Tak	ตาก	province
TH-92	Trang	ตรัง	province
TH-23	Trat	ตราด	province
TH-34	Ubon Ratchathani	อุบลราชธานี	province
TH-41	Udon Thani	อุดรธานี	province
TH-61	Uthai Thani	อุทัยธานี	province
TH-53	Uttaradit	อุตรดิตถ์	province
TH-95	Yala	ยะลา	province
TH-35	Yasothon	ยโสธร	province

== See also ==
- Subdivisions of Thailand
- FIPS region codes of Thailand
- Neighbouring countries: KH, LA, MM, MY
