= ISO 3166-2:MN =

Entry for Mongolia in ISO 3166-2

ISO 3166-2:MN is the entry for Mongolia in ISO 3166-2, part of the ISO 3166 standard published by the International Organization for Standardization (ISO), which defines codes for the names of the principal subdivisions (e.g., provinces or states) of all countries coded in ISO 3166-1.

Currently for Mongolia, ISO 3166-2 codes are defined for one capital city and 21 provinces. The capital of the country Ulaanbaatar has special status equal to the provinces.

Each code consists of two parts separated by a hyphen. The first part is MN, the ISO 3166-1 alpha-2 code of Mongolia. The second part is either of the following:

- one digit: capital city
- three digits: provinces

== Current codes ==
Subdivision names are listed as in the ISO 3166-2 standard published by the ISO 3166 Maintenance Agency (ISO 3166/MA).

Click on the button in the header to sort each column.

| Code | Subdivision name (mn) (BGN/PCGN 1964) | Subdivision name (mn) (Note: For reference only, Mongolian name in Cyrillic script not included in the ISO 3166-2 standard.) | Subdivision category |
|---|---|---|---|
| MN-073 | Arhangay | Архангай | province |
| MN-069 | Bayanhongor | Баянхонгор | province |
| MN-071 | Bayan-Ölgiy | Баян-Өлгий | province |
| MN-067 | Bulgan | Булган | province |
| MN-037 | Darhan uul | Дархан-Уул | province |
| MN-061 | Dornod | Дорнод | province |
| MN-063 | Dornogovĭ | Дорноговь | province |
| MN-059 | Dundgovĭ | Дундговь | province |
| MN-057 | Dzavhan | Завхан | province |
| MN-065 | Govĭ-Altay | Говь-Алтай | province |
| MN-064 | Govĭ-Sümber | Говьсүмбэр | province |
| MN-039 | Hentiy | Хэнтий | province |
| MN-043 | Hovd | Ховд | province |
| MN-041 | Hövsgöl | Хөвсгөл | province |
| MN-053 | Ömnögovĭ | Өмнөговь | province |
| MN-035 | Orhon | Орхон | province |
| MN-055 | Övörhangay | Өвөрхангай | province |
| MN-049 | Selenge | Сэлэнгэ | province |
| MN-051 | Sühbaatar | Сүхбаатар | province |
| MN-047 | Töv | Төв | province |
| MN-1 | Ulaanbaatar | Улаанбаатар | capital city |
| MN-046 | Uvs | Увс | province |

== See also ==
- Subdivisions of Mongolia
- FIPS region codes of Mongolia
- Neighbouring countries: CN, RU
