= ISO 3166-2:TR =

Entry for Turkey in ISO 3166-2

ISO 3166-2:TR is the entry for Turkey (spelled "Türkiye") in ISO 3166-2, part of the ISO 3166 standard published by the International Organization for Standardization (ISO), which defines codes for the names of the principal subdivisions (e.g., provinces or states) of all countries coded in ISO 3166-1.

Currently for Turkey, ISO 3166-2 codes are defined for 81 provinces.

Each code consists of two parts, separated by a hyphen. The first part is TR, the ISO 3166-1 alpha-2 code of Turkey. The second part is two digits:

- 01–67: provinces as of mid 1980s
- 68–71: provinces created in 1989
- 72–73: provinces created in 1990
- 74: province created in 1991
- 75–76: provinces created in 1994
- 77–79: provinces created in 1995
- 80: province created in 1997
- 81: province created in 1999

The digits are currently used in vehicle registration plates and postal codes. The codes 01–67 are assigned in Turkish alphabetical order, except Mersin, Kahramanmaraş and Şanlıurfa, whose codes are assigned based on their historic names, İçel, Maraş and Urfa respectively.

== Current codes ==
Subdivision names are listed as in the ISO 3166-2 standard published by the ISO 3166 Maintenance Agency (ISO 3166/MA).

Subdivision names are sorted in Turkish alphabetical order: a-c, ç, d-g, ğ, h, ı, i-o, ö, p-s, ş, t-u, ü, v-z.

Click on the button in the header to sort each column.

Map of Turkey with each province labelled with the second part of its ISO 3166-2 code (with leading digit 0 omitted).

Code	Subdivision name (tr)
TR-01	Adana
TR-02	Adıyaman
TR-03	Afyonkarahisar
TR-04	Ağrı
TR-68	Aksaray
TR-05	Amasya
TR-06	Ankara
TR-07	Antalya
TR-75	Ardahan
TR-08	Artvin
TR-09	Aydın
TR-10	Balıkesir
TR-74	Bartın
TR-72	Batman
TR-69	Bayburt
TR-11	Bilecik
TR-12	Bingöl
TR-13	Bitlis
TR-14	Bolu
TR-15	Burdur
TR-16	Bursa
TR-17	Çanakkale
TR-18	Çankırı
TR-19	Çorum
TR-20	Denizli
TR-21	Diyarbakır
TR-81	Düzce
TR-22	Edirne
TR-23	Elazığ
TR-24	Erzincan
TR-25	Erzurum
TR-26	Eskişehir
TR-27	Gaziantep
TR-28	Giresun
TR-29	Gümüşhane
TR-30	Hakkâri
TR-31	Hatay
TR-76	Iğdır
TR-32	Isparta
TR-34	İstanbul
TR-35	İzmir
TR-46	Kahramanmaraş
TR-78	Karabük
TR-70	Karaman
TR-36	Kars
TR-37	Kastamonu
TR-38	Kayseri
TR-71	Kırıkkale
TR-39	Kırklareli
TR-40	Kırşehir
TR-79	Kilis
TR-41	Kocaeli
TR-42	Konya
TR-43	Kütahya
TR-44	Malatya
TR-45	Manisa
TR-47	Mardin
TR-33	Mersin
TR-48	Muğla
TR-49	Muş
TR-50	Nevşehir
TR-51	Niğde
TR-52	Ordu
TR-80	Osmaniye
TR-53	Rize
TR-54	Sakarya
TR-55	Samsun
TR-56	Siirt
TR-57	Sinop
TR-58	Sivas
TR-63	Şanlıurfa
TR-73	Şırnak
TR-59	Tekirdağ
TR-60	Tokat
TR-61	Trabzon
TR-62	Tunceli
TR-64	Uşak
TR-65	Van
TR-77	Yalova
TR-66	Yozgat
TR-67	Zonguldak

== Changes ==
The following changes to the entry have been announced in newsletters by the ISO 3166/MA since the first publication of ISO 3166-2 in 1998:

Newsletter	Date issued	Description of change in newsletter	Code/Subdivision change
Newsletter I-1	2000-06-21	Addition of 1 new province. Correction of 2 spelling errors	Subdivisions added: TR-80 Osmaniye
Newsletter I-2	2002-05-21	Addition of one province. Update of list source information	Subdivisions added: TR-81 Düzce
Newsletter II-3	2011-12-13 (corrected 2011-12-15)	Toponym evolution and source list update.	

== See also ==
- Subdivisions of Turkey
- FIPS region codes of Turkey
- NUTS codes of Turkey
- Neighbouring countries: AM, AZ, BG, GE, GR, IQ, IR, SY
