= ISO 3166-2:AF =

Entry for Afghanistan in ISO 3166-2

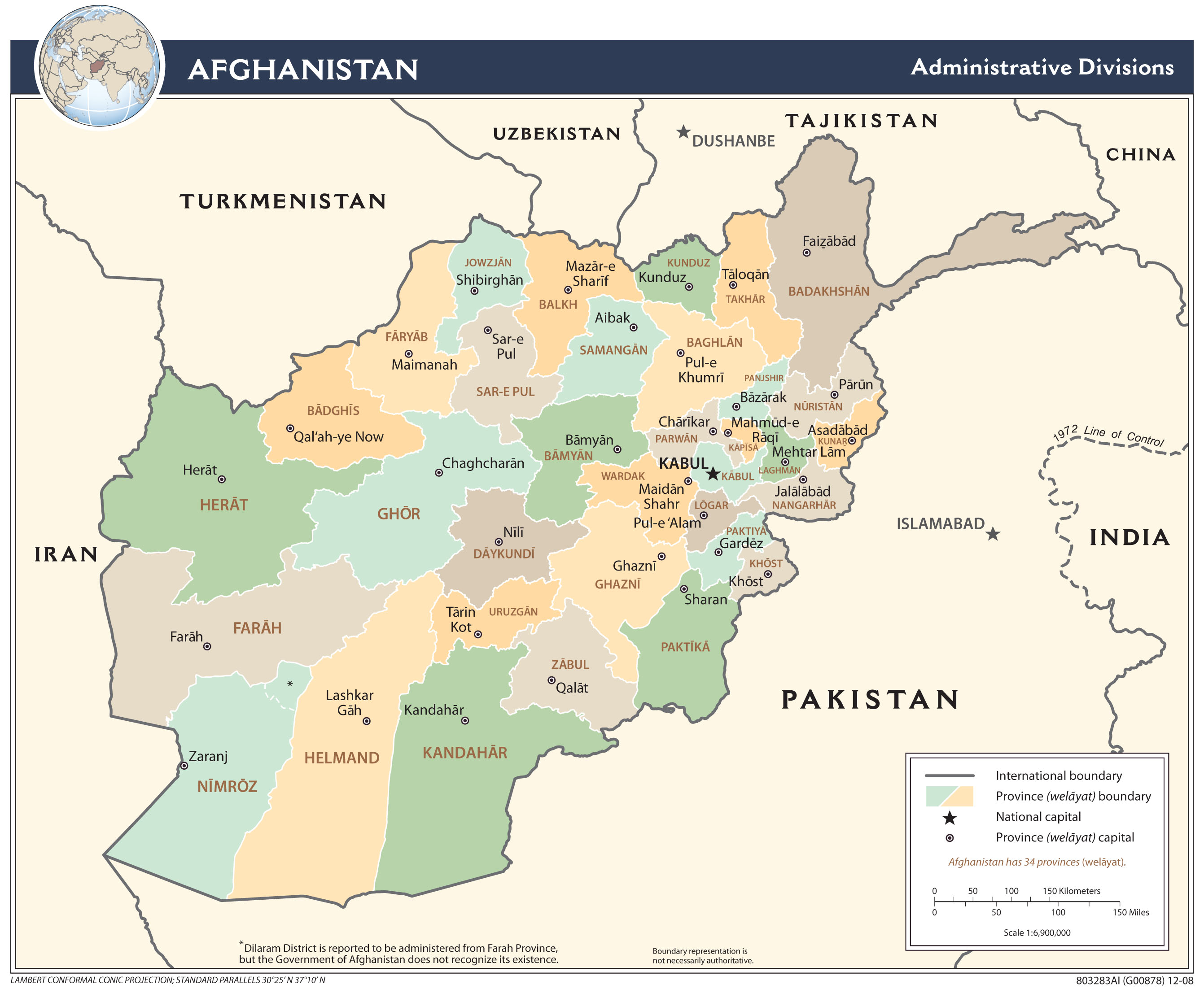
Map of administrative divisions of Afghanistan, 2009

ISO 3166-2:AF is the entry for Afghanistan in ISO 3166-2, part of the ISO 3166 standard published by the International Organization for Standardization (ISO), which defines codes for the names of the principal subdivisions (e.g., provinces or states) of all countries coded in ISO 3166-1.

Currently for Afghanistan, ISO 3166-2 codes are defined for 34 provinces.

Each code consists of two parts, separated by a hyphen. The first part is AF, the ISO 3166-1 alpha-2 code of Afghanistan. The second part is three letters.

== Current codes ==
Subdivision names are listed as in the ISO 3166-2 standard published by the ISO 3166 Maintenance Agency (ISO 3166/MA).

Click on the button in the header to sort each column.

Code	Subdivision name (fa), (ps) (BGN/PCGN 2007)	Subdivision name (en) (Note: For reference only, English name not included in the ISO 3166-2 standard.)	Subdivision name (fa) (Note: For reference only, Persian name in Persian script not included in the ISO 3166-2 standard.)	Subdivision name (ps) (Note: For reference only, Pashto name in Persian script not included in the ISO 3166-2 standard.)
AF-BDS	Badakhshān	Badakhshan	بدخشان	بدخشان
AF-BDG	Bādghīs	Badghis	بادغیس	بادغیس
AF-BGL	Baghlān	Baghlan	بغلان	بغلان
AF-BAL	Balkh	Balkh	بلخ	بلخ
AF-BAM	Bāmyān	Bamyan	بامیان	بامیان
AF-DAY	Dāykundī	Daykundi	دایکندی	دایکندی
AF-FRA	Farāh	Farah	فراه	فراه
AF-FYB	Fāryāb	Faryab	فاریاب	فاریاب
AF-GHA	Ghaznī	Ghazni	غزنى	غزني
AF-GHO	Ghōr	Ghōr	غور	غور
AF-HEL	Helmand	Helmand	هلمند	هلمند
AF-HER	Herāt	Herat	هرات	هرات
AF-JOW	Jowzjān	Jowzjan	جوزجان	جوزجان
AF-KAB	Kābul	Kabul	کابل	کابل
AF-KAN	Kandahār	Kandahar	قندهار	کندھار
AF-KAP	Kāpīsā	Kapisa	کاپیسا	کاپيسا
AF-KHO	Khōst	Khost	خوست	خوست
AF-KNR	Kunaṟ	Kunar	کنر	کونړ
AF-KDZ	Kunduz	Kunduz	قندوز	کندوز
AF-LAG	Laghmān	Laghman	لغمان	لغمان
AF-LOG	Lōgar	Logar	لوگَر	لوګر
AF-NAN	Nangarhār	Nangarhar	ننگرهار	ننګرهار
AF-NIM	Nīmrōz	Nimruz	نیمروز	نيمروز
AF-NUR	Nūristān	Nuristan	نورستان	نورستان
AF-PKA	Paktīkā	Paktika	پکتیکا	پکتیکا
AF-PIA	Paktiyā	Paktia	پکتیا	پکتیا
AF-PAN	Panjshayr	Panjshir	پنجشیر	پنجشیر
AF-PAR	Parwān	Parwan	پروان	پروان
AF-SAM	Samangān	Samangan	سمنگان	سمنګان
AF-SAR	Sar-e Pul	Sar-e Pol	سرپل	سرپل
AF-TAK	Takhār	Takhar	تخار	تخار
AF-URU	Uruzgān	Urozgan	اروزگان	اروزګان
AF-WAR	Wardak	Maidan Wardak	ميدان وردگ	ميدان وردگ
AF-ZAB	Zābul	Zabul	زابل	زابل

== Changes ==
The following changes to the entry have been announced in newsletters by the ISO 3166/MA since the first publication of ISO 3166-2 in 1998. ISO stopped issuing newsletters in 2013.

Newsletter	Date issued	Description of change in newsletter	Code/Subdivision change
Newsletter I-6	2004-03-08	Addition of 2 provinces. Update of list source	Subdivisions added: AF-KHO Khowst; AF-NUR Nūrestān
Newsletter I-7	2005-09-13	Addition of 2 provinces. Update of list source	Subdivisions added: AF-DAY Dāykondī; AF-PAN Panjshīr
Newsletter II-3	2011-12-13 (corrected 2011-12-15)	Language corrections, administrative name corrections, alphabetical re-ordering and source list update	Codes: AF-LOW Lowgar → AF-LOG Lōgar; AF-ORU Orūzgān → AF-URU Uruzgān

The following changes to the entry are listed on ISO's online catalogue, the Online Browsing Platform:

Effective date of change	Short description of change (en)
2011-12-13	Language corrections; administrative name corrections, alphabetical re-ordering and source list update.
2015-11-27	Correction of the local short name; change romanization system; change of spelling of categories of pus and fas; change of spelling of AF-KNR; update List Source
2018-11-26	Correction of the romanization system label

== See also ==
- Subdivisions of Afghanistan
- FIPS region codes of Afghanistan
- Neighbouring countries: CN, IR, PK, TJ, TM, UZ
