= ISO 3166-2:RU =

Entry for Russia in ISO 3166-2

ISO 3166-2:RU is the entry for Russia in ISO 3166-2, part of the ISO 3166 standard published by the International Organization for Standardization (ISO), which defines codes for some of the names of the principal subdivisions (e.g., provinces or states) of all countries coded in ISO 3166-1. ISO 3166-2:RU contains no codes for the Russian-administered Crimea, Donetsk, Kherson, Luhansk, Sevastopol, and Zaporizhzhia, which are internationally recognized as part of Ukraine and do have codes in Ukraine's entry in ISO 3166-2.

Currently for Russia, ISO 3166-2 codes are defined for the following federal subjects:

- 21 republics
- nine administrative territories
- 46 administrative regions
- two autonomous cities
- one autonomous region
- four autonomous districts

Each code consists of two parts separated by a hyphen. The first part is RU, the ISO 3166-1 alpha-2 code of Russia. The second part is either of the following:

- two letters: republics
- three letters: all other subdivisions

== Current codes ==
Subdivision names are listed as in the ISO 3166-2 standard published by the ISO 3166 Maintenance Agency (ISO 3166/MA).

Click on the button in the header to sort each column.

| Code | Subdivision name (ru) (BGN/PCGN 1947) | Subdivision name (ru) (GOST 1983 = UN V/18 1987) | Subdivision name (ru) | Subdivision name (en) | Subdivision category |
|---|---|---|---|---|---|
| RU-AD | Adygeya, Respublika | Adygeja, Respublika | Республика Адыгея | Adygea | republic |
| RU-AL | Altay, Respublika | Altaj, Respublika | Республика Алтай | Gorno-Altai | republic |
| RU-ALT | Altayskiy kray | Altajskij kraj | Алтайский край | Altai | administrative territory |
| RU-AMU | Amurskaya oblast' | Amurskaja oblast' | Амурская область | Amur | administrative region |
| RU-ARK | Arkhangel'skaya oblast' | Arhangel'skaja oblast' | Архангельская область | Arkhangelsk | administrative region |
| RU-AST | Astrakhanskaya oblast' | Astrahanskaja oblast' | Астраханская область | Astrakhan | administrative region |
| RU-BA | Bashkortostan, Respublika | Baškortostan, Respublika | Республика Башкортостан | Bashkortostan | republic |
| RU-BEL | Belgorodskaya oblast' | Belgorodskaja oblast' | Белгородская область | Belgorod | administrative region |
| RU-BRY | Bryanskaya oblast' | Brjanskaja oblast' | Брянская область | Bryansk | administrative region |
| RU-BU | Buryatiya, Respublika | Burjatija, Respublika | Республика Бурятия | Buryatia | republic |
| RU-CE | Chechenskaya Respublika | Čečenskaja; Respublika | Чеченская; Республика | Chechnya | republic |
| RU-CHE | Chelyabinskaya oblast' | Čeljabinskaja oblast' | Челябинская область | Chelyabinsk | administrative region |
| RU-CHU | Chukotskiy avtonomnyy okrug | Čukotskij avtonomnyj okrug | Чукотский автономный округ | Chukotka | autonomous district |
| RU-CU | Chuvashskaya Respublika | Čuvašskaja; Respublika | Чувашская Республика | Chuvashia | republic |
| RU-DA | Dagestan, Respublika | Dagestan, Respublika | Республика Дагестан | Dagestan | republic |
| RU-IN | Ingushetiya, Respublika | Ingušetija, Respublika | Республика; Ингушетия | Ingushetia | republic |
| RU-IRK | Irkutskaya oblast' | Irkutskaja oblast' | Иркутская область | Irkutsk | administrative region |
| RU-IVA | Ivanovskaya oblast' | Ivanovskaja oblast' | Ивановская область | Ivanovo | administrative region |
| RU-KB | Kabardino- Balkarskaya; Respublika | Kabardino- Balkarskaja; Respublika | Кабардино-Балкарская Республика | Kabardino- Balkaria | republic |
| RU-KGD | Kaliningradskaya oblast' | Kaliningradskaja oblast' | Калининградская область | Kaliningrad | administrative region |
| RU-KL | Kalmykiya, Respublika | Kalmykija, Respublika | Республика Калмыкия | Kalmykia | republic |
| RU-KLU | Kaluzhskaya oblast' | Kalužskaja oblast' | Калужская область | Kaluga | administrative region |
| RU-KAM | Kamchatskiy kray | Kamčatskij kraj | Камчатский край | Kamchatka | administrative territory |
| RU-KC | Karachayevo-Cherkesskaya; Respublika | Karačaevo- Čerkesskaja; Respublika | Карачаево- Черкесская Республика | Karachay-Cherkessia | republic |
| RU-KR | Kareliya, Respublika | Karelija, Respublika | Республика Карелия | Karelia | republic |
| RU-KEM | Kemerovskaya oblast' | Kemerovskaja oblast' | Кемеровская область | Kemerovo | administrative region |
| RU-KHA | Khabarovskiy kray | Habarovskij kraj | Хабаровский край | Khabarovsk | administrative territory |
| RU-KK | Khakasiya, Respublika | Hakasija, Respublika | Республика Хакасия | Khakassia | republic |
| RU-KHM | Khanty- Mansiyskiy avtonomnyy okrug (local variant: Yugra) | Hanty- Mansijskij avtonomnyj okrug (local variant: Jugra) | Ханты- Мансийский автономный округ | Yugoria | autonomous district |
| RU-KIR | Kirovskaya oblast' | Kirovskaja oblast' | Кировская область | Kirov | administrative region |
| RU-KO | Komi, Respublika | Komi, Respublika | Республика Коми | Komi | republic |
| RU-KOS | Kostromskaya oblast' | Kostromskaja oblast' | Костромская область | Kostroma | administrative region |
| RU-KDA | Krasnodarskiy kray | Krasnodarskij kraj | Краснодарский край | Krasnodar | administrative territory |
| RU-KYA | Krasnoyarskiy kray | Krasnojarskij kraj | Красноярский край | Krasnoyarsk | administrative territory |
| RU-KGN | Kurganskaya oblast' | Kurganskaja oblast' | Курганская область | Kurgan | administrative region |
| RU-KRS | Kurskaya oblast' | Kurskaja oblast' | Курская область | Kursk | administrative region |
| RU-LEN | Leningradskaya oblast' | Leningradskaja oblast' | Ленинградская область | Leningrad | administrative region |
| RU-LIP | Lipetskaya oblast' | Lipeckaja oblast' | Липецкая область | Lipetsk | administrative region |
| RU-MAG | Magadanskaya oblast' | Magadanskaja oblast' | Магаданская область | Magadan | administrative region |
| RU-ME | Mariy El, Respublika | Marij Èl, Respublika | Республика Марий Эл | Mari El | republic |
| RU-MO | Mordoviya, Respublika | Mordovija, Respublika | Республика Мордовия | Mordovia | republic |
| RU-MOS | Moskovskaya oblast' | Moskovskaja oblast' | Московская область | Moscow | administrative region |
| RU-MOW | Moskva | Moskva | Москва | Moscow City | autonomous city |
| RU-MUR | Murmanskaya oblast' | Murmanskaja oblast' | Мурманская область | Murmansk | administrative region |
| RU-NEN | Nenetskiy avtonomnyy okrug | Neneckij avtonomnyj okrug | Ненецкий автономный округ | Nenetsia | autonomous district |
| RU-NIZ | Nizhegorodskaya oblast' | Nižegorodskaja oblast' | Нижегородская область | Nizhny Novgorod | administrative region |
| RU-NGR | Novgorodskaya oblast' | Novgorodskaja oblast' | Новгородская область | Novgorod | administrative region |
| RU-NVS | Novosibirskaya oblast' | Novosibirskaja oblast' | Новосибирская область | Novosibirsk | administrative region |
| RU-OMS | Omskaya oblast' | Omskaja oblast' | Омская область | Omsk | administrative region |
| RU-ORE | Orenburgskaya oblast' | Orenburgskaja oblast' | Оренбургская область | Orenburg | administrative region |
| RU-ORL | Orlovskaya oblast' | Orlovskaja oblast' | Орловская область | Oryol | administrative region |
| RU-PNZ | Penzenskaya oblast' | Penzenskaja oblast' | Пензенская область | Penza | administrative region |
| RU-PER | Permskiy kray | Permskij kraj | Пермский край | Perm | administrative territory |
| RU-PRI | Primorskiy kray | Primorskij kraj | Приморский край | Primorye | administrative territory |
| RU-PSK | Pskovskaya oblast' | Pskovskaja oblast' | Псковская область | Pskov | administrative region |
| RU-ROS | Rostovskaya oblast' | Rostovskaja oblast' | Ростовская область | Rostov | administrative region |
| RU-RYA | Ryazanskaya oblast' | Rjazanskaja oblast' | Рязанская область | Ryazan | administrative region |
| RU-SA | Saha, Respublika (local variant: Jakutija) | Sakha, Respublika (local variant: Yakutiya) | Республика Саха | Yakutia | republic |
| RU-SAK | Sakhalinskaya oblast' | Sahalinskaja oblast' | Сахалинская область | Sakhalin | administrative region |
| RU-SAM | Samarskaya oblast' | Samarskaja oblast' | Самарская область | Samara | administrative region |
| RU-SPE | Sankt-Peterburg | Sankt-Peterburg | Санкт-Петербург | Saint Petersburg | autonomous city |
| RU-SAR | Saratovskaya oblast' | Saratovskaja oblast' | Саратовская область | Saratov | administrative region |
| RU-SE | Severnaya Osetiya, Respublika (local variant: Alaniya [Respublika Severnaya Osetiya – Alaniya]) | Severnaja Osetija, Respublika (local variant: Alanija [Respublika Severnaja Osetija – Alanija]) | Республика; Северная Осетия | North Ossetia | republic |
| RU-SMO | Smolenskaya oblast' | Smolenskaja oblast' | Смоленская область | Smolensk | administrative region |
| RU-STA | Stavropol'skiy kray | Stavropol'skij kraj | Ставропольский край | Stavropol | administrative territory |
| RU-SVE | Sverdlovskaya oblast' | Sverdlovskaja oblast' | Свердловская область | Sverdlovsk | administrative region |
| RU-TAM | Tambovskaya oblast' | Tambovskaja oblast' | Тамбовская область | Tambov | administrative region |
| RU-TA | Tatarstan, Respublika | Tatarstan, Respublika | Республика Татарстан | Tatarstan | republic |
| RU-TOM | Tomskaya oblast' | Tomskaja oblast' | Томская область | Tomsk | administrative region |
| RU-TUL | Tul'skaya oblast' | Tul'skaja oblast' | Тульская область | Tula | administrative region |
| RU-TVE | Tverskaya oblast' | Tverskaja oblast' | Тверская область | Tver | administrative region |
| RU-TYU | Tyumenskaya oblast' | Tjumenskaja oblast' | Тюменская область | Tyumen | administrative region |
| RU-TY | Tyva, Respublika (local variant: Tuva) | Tyva, Respublika (local variant: Tuva) | Республика Тыва | Tuva | republic |
| RU-UD | Udmurtskaya Respublika | Udmurtskaja; Respublika | Удмуртская Республика | Udmurtia | republic |
| RU-ULY | Ul'yanovskaya oblast' | Ul'janovskaja oblast' | Ульяновская область | Ulyanovsk | administrative region |
| RU-VLA | Vladimirskaya oblast' | Vladimirskaja oblast' | Владимирская область | Vladimir | administrative region |
| RU-VGG | Volgogradskaya oblast' | Volgogradskaja oblast' | Волгоградская область | Volgograd | administrative region |
| RU-VLG | Vologodskaya oblast' | Vologodskaja oblast' | Вологодская область | Vologda | administrative region |
| RU-VOR | Voronezhskaya oblast' | Voronežskaja oblast' | Воронежская область | Voronezh | administrative region |
| RU-YAN | Yamalo- Nenetskiy avtonomnyy okrug | Jamalo- Neneckij avtonomnyj okrug | Ямало- Ненецкий автономный округ | Yamalia | autonomous district |
| RU-YAR | Yaroslavskaya oblast' | Jaroslavskaja oblast' | Ярославская область | Yaroslavl | administrative region |
| RU-YEV | Yevreyskaya avtonomnaya oblast' | Evrejskaja avtonomnaja oblast' | Еврейская автономная область | Jewish Autonomous Oblast | autonomous region |
| RU-ZAB | Zabaykal'skiy kray | Zabajkal'skij kraj | Забайкальский край | Transbaikalia | administrative territory |

== Changes ==
The following changes to the entry have been announced by the ISO 3166/MA since the first publication of ISO 3166-2 in 1998. ISO stopped issuing newsletters in 2013.

| Newsletter | Date issued | Description of change in newsletter | Code/Subdivision change |
|---|---|---|---|
| Newsletter I-1 | 2000-06-21 | Introduction of alternative name forms for 2 republics. Correction of a spelling mistake in the name of 1 autonomous district | |
| Newsletter I-7 | 2005-09-13 | Add local language name to the title Khanty-Mansiyskiy avtonomnyy okrug. Update of list source | |
| Newsletter I-8 | 2007-04-17 | Modification of the administrative structure | Subdivisions added: RU-PER Permskiy kray Subdivisions deleted: RU-PER Permskaya oblast' RU-KOP Komi-Permyatskiy avtonomnyy okrug |
| Newsletter I-9 | 2007-11-28 | Update and use of long forms of country names as given in Draft NL I-8 538, 22-02-2007 and formation of Permskiy kray after amalgamation | Subdivisions added: RU-KAM Kamchatskiy kray Subdivisions deleted: RU-KAM Kamchatskaya oblast' RU-EVE Evenkiyskiy avtonomnyy okrug RU-KOR Koryakskiy avtonomnyy okrug RU-TAY Taymyrskiy avtonomnyy okrug |
| Newsletter II-2 | 2010-06-30 | Update of the administrative structure and of the list source | Subdivisions added: RU-ZAB Zabaykal'skiy kray Subdivisions deleted: RU-CHI Chitinskaya oblast' RU-AGB Aginskiy Buryatskiy avtonomnyy okrug RU-UOB Ust'-Ordynskiy Buryatskiy avtonomnyy okrug |
| Online Browsing; Platform (OBP) | 2018-11-26 | Correction of the romanization system label | |
| Online Browsing; Platform (OBP) | 2021-11-25 | Correction of language from 'urd' to 'rus' for RU-PSK, RU-ROS, RU-PRI | |

== See also ==
- Subdivisions of Russia
- FIPS region codes of Russia
- GOST 7.67 (Russian ISO-based standard for Cyrillic and Latin coding for Russian regions and countries)
- Neighbouring countries: AZ, BY, CN, EE, FI, GE, KP, KZ, LT, LV, MN, NO, PL, UA
