= ISO 3166-2:BD =

Entry for Bangladesh in ISO 3166-2

ISO 3166-2:BD is the entry for Bangladesh in ISO 3166-2, part of the ISO 3166 standard published by the International Organization for Standardization (ISO), which defines codes for the names of the principal subdivisions (e.g., provinces or states) of all countries coded in ISO 3166-1.

Currently for Bangladesh, ISO 3166-2 codes are defined for two levels of subdivisions:

- eight divisions
- 64 districts

Each code consists of two parts, separated by a hyphen. The first part is BD, the ISO 3166-1 alpha-2 code of Bangladesh. The second part is either of the following:

- one letter (A–H): divisions
- two digits (01–64): districts

== Current codes ==
Subdivision names are listed as in the ISO 3166-2 standard published by the ISO 3166 Maintenance Agency (ISO 3166/MA).

Click on the button in the header to sort each column.

=== Divisions ===
Code	Subdivision name (bn)	Subdivision name (bn) (Note: For reference only, Bengali name in Bengali script not included in the ISO 3166-2 standard.)	Local variant
BD-A	Barishal	বরিশাল	
BD-B	Chattogram	চট্টগ্রাম	Chittagong
BD-C	Dhaka	ঢাকা	
BD-D	Khulna	খুলনা	
BD-H	Mymensingh	ময়মনসিংহ	
BD-E	Rajshahi	রাজশাহী	
BD-F	Rangpur	রংপুর	
BD-G	Sylhet	সিলেট	

=== Districts ===
Code	Subdivision name (bn)	Subdivision name (bn)	Local variant	In division
BD-05	Bagerhat	বাগেরহাট		D
BD-01	Bandarban	বান্দরবান		B
BD-02	Barguna	বরগুনা		A
BD-06	Barishal	বরিশাল		A
BD-07	Bhola	ভোলা		A
BD-03	Bogura	বগুড়া		E
BD-04	Brahmanbaria	ব্রাহ্মণবাড়িয়া		B
BD-09	Chandpur	চাঁদপুর		B
BD-45	Chapai Nawabganj	চাঁপাইনবাবগঞ্জ		E
BD-10	Chattogram	চট্টগ্রাম	Chittagong	B
BD-12	Chuadanga	চুয়াডাঙ্গা		D
BD-11	Cox's Bazar	কক্সবাজার		B
BD-08	Cumilla	কুমিল্লা		B
BD-13	Dhaka	ঢাকা		C
BD-14	Dinajpur	দিনাজপুর		F
BD-15	Faridpur	ফরিদপুর		C
BD-16	Feni	ফেনী		B
BD-19	Gaibandha	গাইবান্ধা		F
BD-18	Gazipur	গাজীপুর		C
BD-17	Gopalganj	গোপালগঞ্জ		C
BD-20	Habiganj	হবিগঞ্জ		G
BD-21	Jamalpur	জামালপুর		H
BD-22	Jashore	যশোর		D
BD-25	Jhalakathi	ঝালকাঠি		A
BD-23	Jhenaidah	ঝিনাইদহ		D
BD-24	Joypurhat	জয়পুরহাট		E
BD-29	Khagrachhari	খাগড়াছড়ি		B
BD-27	Khulna	খুলনা		D
BD-26	Kishoreganj	কিশোরগঞ্জ		C
BD-28	Kurigram	কুড়িগ্রাম		F
BD-30	Kushtia	কুষ্টিয়া		D
BD-31	Lakshmipur	লক্ষ্মীপুর		B
BD-32	Lalmonirhat	লালমনিরহাট		F
BD-36	Madaripur	মাদারীপুর		C
BD-37	Magura	মাগুরা		D
BD-33	Manikganj	মানিকগঞ্জ		C
BD-39	Meherpur	মেহেরপুর		D
BD-38	Moulvibazar	মৌলভীবাজার		G
BD-35	Munshiganj	মুন্সীগঞ্জ		C
BD-34	Mymensingh	ময়মনসিংহ		H
BD-48	Naogaon	নওগাঁ		E
BD-43	Narail	নড়াইল		D
BD-40	Narayanganj	নারায়ণগঞ্জ		C
BD-42	Narsingdi	নরসিংদী		C
BD-44	Natore	নাটোর		E
BD-41	Netrakona	নেত্রকোণা		H
BD-46	Nilphamari	নীলফামারী		F
BD-47	Noakhali	নোয়াখালী		B
BD-49	Pabna	পাবনা		E
BD-52	Panchagarh	পঞ্চগড়		F
BD-51	Patuakhali	পটুয়াখালী		A
BD-50	Pirojpur	পিরোজপুর		A
BD-53	Rajbari	রাজবাড়ী		C
BD-54	Rajshahi	রাজশাহী		E
BD-56	Rangamati	রাঙ্গামাটি		B
BD-55	Rangpur	রংপুর		F
BD-58	Satkhira	সাতক্ষীরা		D
BD-62	Shariatpur	শরিয়তপুর		C
BD-57	Sherpur	শেরপুর		H
BD-59	Sirajganj	সিরাজগঞ্জ		E
BD-61	Sunamganj	সুনামগঞ্জ		G
BD-60	Sylhet	সিলেট		G
BD-63	Tangail	টাঙ্গাইল		C
BD-64	Thakurgaon	ঠাকুরগাঁও		F

== Changes ==
The following changes to the entry have been announced in newsletters by the ISO 3166/MA since the first publication of ISO 3166-2 in 1998. ISO stopped issuing newsletters in 2013.

Newsletter	Date issued	Description of change in newsletter	Code/Subdivision change
Newsletter I-2	2002-05-21	New list source. One division added. 31 regions cancelled. Allocation of districts to divisions instead of regions. Correction of one spelling error	Subdivisions added: BD-6 Sylhet bibhag Subdivisions deleted: 21 regions (see below)
Newsletter II-3	2011-12-13 (corrected 2011-12-15)	Country name romanization adjustment, first level prefix addition, deletion of generic terms, addition of administrative division and source list update	Subdivisions added: BD-F Rangpur (division); Codes: Barisal (division) : BD-1 → BD-A; Chittagong (division) : BD-2 → BD-B; Dhaka (division) : BD-3 → BD-C; Khulna (division) : BD-4 → BD-D; Rajshahi (division) : BD-5 → BD-E; Sylhet (division) : BD-6 → BD-G

The following changes to the entry are listed on ISO's online catalogue, the Online Browsing Platform:

Effective date of change	Short description of change (en)
2012-02-15	Correct local short name and align with ISO 3166-2
2016-11-15	Change of spelling of BD-24, BD-25, BD-29, BD-45; change of parent subdivision of BD-21, BD-34, BD-41, BD-55, BD-57; addition of parent subdivision BD-H; addition of an asterisk to divisions; update list source
2018-11-26	Correction of the romanization system label
2020-11-24	Change of spelling of BD-03, BD-06, BD-08, BD-10, BD-22, BD-A, BD-B; Addition of local variation for BD-10, BD-B; Correction of the Code Source

=== Codes deleted in Newsletter I-2 ===
Former code	Subdivision name	In division	Districts in region
BD-2A	Bandarban anchal	2	01
BD-1B	Barisal anchal	1	06, 07, 25, 50
BD-5C	Bogra anchal	5	03, 24
BD-2D	Chittagong anchal	2	10, 11
BD-2E	Chittagong Hill Tracts	2	29, 56
BD-2F	Comilla anchal	2	04, 09, 08
BD-3G	Dhaka anchal	3	13, 18, 33, 35, 40, 42
BD-5H	Dinajpur anchal	5	14, 52, 64
BD-3I	Faridpur anchal	3	15, 17, 36, 53, 62
BD-3J	Jamalpur anchal	3	21, 57
BD-4K	Jessore anchal	4	22, 23, 37, 43
BD-4L	Khulna anchal	4	05, 27, 58
BD-4M	Khustia anchal	4	12, 30, 39
BD-3N	Mymensingh anchal	3	26, 34, 41
BD-2O	Noakhali anchal	2	16, 31, 47
BD-5P	Pabna anchal	5	49, 59
BD-1Q	Patuakhali anchal	1	02, 51
BD-5R	Rajshahi anchal	5	48, 44, 45, 54
BD-5S	Rangpur anchal	5	19, 28, 32, 46, 55
BD-2T	Sylhet anchal	2	20, 38, 61, 60
BD-3U	Tangail anchal	3	63

== See also ==
- Subdivisions of Bangladesh
- FIPS region codes of Bangladesh
- Neighbouring countries: IN, MM
