= ISO 3166-2:NA =

Entry for Namibia in ISO 3166-2

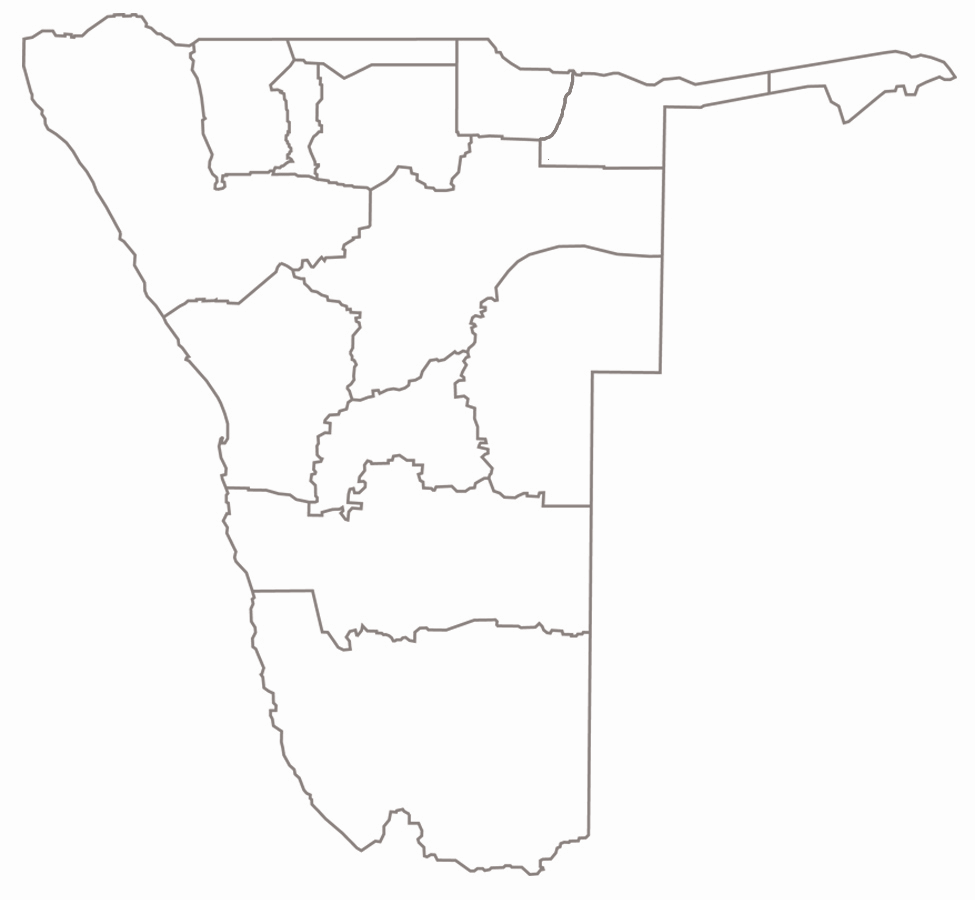
Map of the 14 regions in Namibia

ISO 3166-2:NA is the entry for Namibia in ISO 3166-2, part of the ISO 3166 standard published by the International Organization for Standardization (ISO), which defines codes for the names of the principal subdivisions (e.g., provinces or states) of all countries coded in ISO 3166-1.

Currently for Namibia, ISO 3166-2 codes are defined for 14 regions.

Each code consists of two parts, separated by a hyphen. The first part is NA, the ISO 3166-1 alpha-2 code of Namibia. The second part is two letters.

The Kavango East and Kavango West regions were created in August 2013 by a split of Kavango Region (which was named Okavango before 1998). At the same time, Caprivi and Karas were renamed Zambezi and ǁKaras, respectively. However, the code for the Zambezi Region was not changed, and is still derived from the former name.

== Current codes ==
Subdivision names are listed as in the ISO 3166-2 standard published by the ISO 3166 Maintenance Agency (ISO 3166/MA).

Click on the button in the header to sort each column.

Code	Subdivision name (en)	Local variant
NA-ER	Erongo	
NA-HA	Hardap	
NA-KA	//Karas	Karas; !Karas
NA-KE	Kavango East	
NA-KW	Kavango West	
NA-KH	Khomas	
NA-KU	Kunene	
NA-OW	Ohangwena	
NA-OH	Omaheke	
NA-OS	Omusati	
NA-ON	Oshana	
NA-OT	Oshikoto	
NA-OD	Otjozondjupa	
NA-CA	Zambezi	

== Changes ==
The following changes to the entry are listed on ISO's online catalogue, the Online Browsing Platform:

Effective date of change	Short description of change (en)
2020-11-24	Change of subdivision name of NA-KA; Change of local variation of NA-KA; Addition of local variation of NA-KA; Update List Source
2016-11-15	Addition of local variation of NA-KA; update list source
2014-11-03	Delete 1 region NA-OK; add two regions NA-KE and NA-KW; change subdivision name of NA-CA

== See also ==
- Subdivisions of Namibia
- FIPS region codes of Namibia
- Neighbouring countries: AO, BW, ZA, ZM
