= ISO 3166-2:ZM =

Entry for Zambia in ISO 3166-2

ISO 3166-2:ZM is the entry for Zambia in ISO 3166-2, part of the ISO 3166 standard published by the International Organization for Standardization (ISO), which defines codes for the names of the principal subdivisions (e.g., provinces or states) of all countries coded in ISO 3166-1.

Currently for Zambia, ISO 3166-2 codes are defined for ten provinces.

Each code consists of two parts separated by a hyphen. The first part is ZM, the ISO 3166-1 alpha-2 code of Zambia. The second part is two digits (01–10).

== Current codes ==
Subdivision names are listed as in the ISO 3166-2 standard published by the ISO 3166 Maintenance Agency (ISO 3166/MA).

Click on the button in the header to sort each column.

Provinces of Zambia

Code	Subdivision name (en)
ZM-02	Central
ZM-08	Copperbelt
ZM-03	Eastern
ZM-04	Luapula
ZM-09	Lusaka
ZM-10	Muchinga
ZM-06	North-Western
ZM-05	Northern
ZM-07	Southern
ZM-01	Western

== Changes ==
The following changes to the entry are listed on ISO's online catalogue, the Online Browsing Platform:

Effective date of change	Short description of change (en)
2014-11-03	Add 1 province ZM-10; update List Source and Code Source

== See also ==
- Subdivisions of Zambia
- FIPS region codes of Zambia
- Neighbouring countries: AO, BW, CD, MW, MZ, NA, TZ, ZW
