= List of FIPS region codes (D–F) =

This is a list of FIPS 10-4 region codes from D-F, using a standardized name format, and cross-linking to articles.

On September 2, 2008, FIPS 10-4 was one of ten standards withdrawn by NIST as a Federal Information Processing Standard. The list here is the last version of codes. For earlier versions, see link below.

== DA: Denmark ==
FIPS Code	Region
DA17	Region Hovedstaden, Denmark
DA18	Region Midtjylland, Denmark (Incorrectly added as "Midtjyllen" in latest change notice)
DA19	Region Nordjylland, Denmark
DA20	Region Sjælland, Denmark
DA21	Region of Southern Denmark, Denmark

== DJ: Djibouti ==
FIPS Code	Region
DJ01	Ali Sabieh District, Djibouti
DJ04	Obock District, Djibouti
DJ05	Tadjourah District, Djibouti
DJ06	Dikhil District, Djibouti
DJ07	Djibouti District, Djibouti
DJ08	Arta District, Djibouti

== DO: Dominica ==
FIPS Code	Region
DO02	Saint Andrew Parish, Dominica
DO03	Saint David Parish, Dominica
DO04	Saint George Parish, Dominica
DO05	Saint John Parish, Dominica
DO06	Saint Joseph Parish, Dominica
DO07	Saint Luke Parish, Dominica
DO08	Saint Mark Parish, Dominica
DO09	Saint Patrick Parish, Dominica
DO10	Saint Paul Parish, Dominica
DO11	Saint Peter Parish, Dominica

== DR: Dominican Republic ==
FIPS Code	Region
DR01	Azua Province, Dominican Republic
DR02	Baoruco Province, Dominican Republic
DR03	Barahona Province, Dominican Republic
DR04	Dajabón Province, Dominican Republic
DR06	Duarte Province, Dominican Republic
DR08	Espaillat Province, Dominican Republic
DR09	Independencia Province, Dominican Republic
DR10	La Altagracia Province, Dominican Republic
DR11	Elías Piña Province, Dominican Republic
DR12	La Romana Province, Dominican Republic
DR14	María Trinidad Sánchez Province, Dominican Republic
DR15	Monte Cristi Province, Dominican Republic
DR16	Pedernales Province, Dominican Republic
DR18	Puerto Plata Province, Dominican Republic
DR19	Salcedo Province, Dominican Republic
DR20	Samaná Province, Dominican Republic
DR21	Sánchez Ramírez Province, Dominican Republic
DR23	San Juan Province, Dominican Republic
DR24	San Pedro de Macorís Province, Dominican Republic
DR25	Santiago Province, Dominican Republic
DR26	Santiago Rodríguez Province, Dominican Republic
DR27	Valverde Province, Dominican Republic
DR28	El Seíbo Province, Dominican Republic
DR29	Hato Mayor Province, Dominican Republic
DR30	La Vega Province, Dominican Republic
DR31	Monseñor Nouel Province, Dominican Republic
DR32	Monte Plata Province, Dominican Republic
DR33	San Cristóbal Province, Dominican Republic
DR34	Distrito Nacional, Dominican Republic
DR35	Peravia Province, Dominican Republic
DR36	San José de Ocoa Province, Dominican Republic
DR37	Santo Domingo Province, Dominican Republic

== EC: Ecuador ==
FIPS Code	Region
EC01	Galápagos Province, Ecuador
EC02	Azuay Province, Ecuador
EC03	Bolívar Province, Ecuador
EC04	Cañar Province, Ecuador
EC05	Carchi Province, Ecuador
EC06	Chimborazo Province, Ecuador
EC07	Cotopaxi Province, Ecuador
EC08	El Oro Province, Ecuador
EC09	Esmeraldas Province, Ecuador
EC10	Guayas Province, Ecuador
EC11	Imbabura Province, Ecuador
EC12	Loja Province, Ecuador
EC13	Los Ríos Province, Ecuador
EC14	Manabí Province, Ecuador
EC15	Morona-Santiago Province, Ecuador
EC17	Pastaza Province, Ecuador
EC18	Pichincha Province, Ecuador
EC19	Tungurahua Province, Ecuador
EC20	Zamora-Chinchipe Province, Ecuador
EC22	Sucumbíos Province, Ecuador
EC23	Napo Province, Ecuador
EC24	Orellana Province, Ecuador

== EG: Egypt ==
FIPS Code	Region
EG01	Ad Daqahlīyah Governorate, Egypt
EG02	Al Baḩr al Aḩmar Governorate, Egypt
EG03	Al Buḩayrah Governorate, Egypt
EG04	Al Fayyūm Governorate, Egypt
EG05	Al Gharbīyah Governorate, Egypt
EG06	Al Iskandarīyah Governorate, Egypt
EG07	Al Ismā`īlīyah Governorate, Egypt
EG08	Al Jīzah Governorate, Egypt
EG09	Al Minūfīyah Governorate, Egypt
EG10	Al Minyā Governorate, Egypt
EG11	Al Qāhirah Governorate, Egypt
EG12	Al Qalyūbīyah Governorate, Egypt
EG13	Al Wādī al Jadīd Governorate, Egypt
EG14	Ash Sharqīyah Governorate, Egypt
EG15	As Suways Governorate, Egypt
EG16	Aswān Governorate, Egypt
EG17	Asyūţ Governorate, Egypt
EG18	Banī Suwayf Governorate, Egypt
EG19	Būr Sa`īd Governorate, Egypt
EG20	Dumyāţ Governorate, Egypt
EG21	Kafr ash Shaykh Governorate, Egypt
EG22	Maţrūḩ Governorate, Egypt
EG23	Qinā Governorate, Egypt
EG24	Sūhāj Governorate, Egypt
EG26	Janūb Sīnā' Governorate, Egypt
EG27	Shamāl Sīnā' Governorate, Egypt

== EI: Ireland ==
FIPS Code	Region
EI01	County Carlow, Ireland
EI02	County Cavan, Ireland
EI03	County Clare, Ireland
EI04	County Cork, Ireland
EI06	County Donegal, Ireland
EI07	County Dublin, Ireland
EI10	County Galway, Ireland
EI11	County Kerry, Ireland
EI12	County Kildare, Ireland
EI13	County Kilkenny, Ireland
EI14	County Leitrim, Ireland
EI15	County Laois, Ireland
EI16	County Limerick, Ireland
EI18	County Longford, Ireland
EI19	County Louth, Ireland
EI20	County Mayo, Ireland
EI21	County Meath, Ireland
EI22	County Monaghan, Ireland
EI23	County Offaly, Ireland
EI24	County Roscommon, Ireland
EI25	County Sligo, Ireland
EI26	County Tipperary, Ireland
EI27	County Waterford, Ireland
EI29	County Westmeath, Ireland
EI30	County Wexford, Ireland
EI31	County Wicklow, Ireland

== EK: Equatorial Guinea ==
FIPS Code	Region
EK03	Annobón Province, Equatorial Guinea
EK04	Bioko Norte Province, Equatorial Guinea
EK05	Bioko Sur Province, Equatorial Guinea
EK06	Centro Sur Province, Equatorial Guinea
EK07	Kié-Ntem Province, Equatorial Guinea
EK08	Litoral Province, Equatorial Guinea
EK09	Wele-Nzas Province, Equatorial Guinea

== EN: Estonia ==
FIPS Code	Region
EN01	Harju County, Estonia
EN02	Hiiu County, Estonia
EN03	Ida-Viru County, Estonia
EN04	Järva County, Estonia
EN05	Jõgeva County, Estonia
EN07	Lääne County, Estonia
EN08	Lääne-Viru County, Estonia
EN11	Pärnu County, Estonia
EN12	Põlva County, Estonia
EN13	Rapla County, Estonia
EN14	Saare County, Estonia
EN18	Tartu County, Estonia
EN19	Valga County, Estonia
EN20	Viljandi County, Estonia
EN21	Võru County, Estonia

== ER: Eritrea ==
FIPS Code	Region
ER01	Ānseba Region, Eritrea
ER02	Debub Region, Eritrea
ER03	Debubawī K’eyih Bahrī Region, Eritrea
ER04	Gash Barka Region, Eritrea
ER05	Ma'ākel Region, Eritrea
ER06:	Semēnawī K’eyih Bahrī Region, Eritrea

== ES: El Salvador ==
FIPS Code	Region
ES01	Ahuachapán Department, El Salvador
ES02	Cabañas Department, El Salvador
ES03	Chalatenango Department, El Salvador
ES04	Cuscatlán Department, El Salvador
ES05	La Libertad Department, El Salvador
ES06	La Paz Department, El Salvador
ES07	La Unión Department, El Salvador
ES08	Morazán Department, El Salvador
ES09	San Miguel Department, El Salvador
ES10	San Salvador Department, El Salvador
ES11	Santa Ana Department, El Salvador
ES12	San Vicente Department, El Salvador
ES13	Sonsonate Department, El Salvador
ES14	Usulután Department, El Salvador

== ET: Ethiopia ==
FIPS Code	Region
ET44	Ādīs Ābeba Administration, Ethiopia
ET45	Āfar State, Ethiopia
ET46	Āmara State, Ethiopia
ET47	Bīnshangul Gumuz State, Ethiopia
ET48	Dirē Dawa Administration, Ethiopia
ET49	Gambēla Hizboch State, Ethiopia
ET50	Hārerī Hizb State, Ethiopia
ET51	Oromīya State, Ethiopia
ET52	Sumalē State, Ethiopia
ET53	Tigray State, Ethiopia
ET54	YeDebub Bihēroch Bihēreseboch na Hizboch State, Ethiopia

== EZ: Czech Republic ==
FIPS Code	Region
EZ52	Prague (capital city), Czech Republic
EZ78	South Moravian Region, Czech Republic
EZ79	South Bohemian, Czech Republic
EZ80	Vysočina Region, Czech Republic
EZ81	Karlovy Vary Region, Czech Republic
EZ82	Hradec Králové, Czech Republic
EZ83	Liberec Region, Czech Republic
EZ84	Olomouc Region, Czech Republic
EZ85	Moravian-Silesian, Czech Republic
EZ86	Pardubice Region, Czech Republic
EZ87	Plzeň Region, Czech Republic
EZ88	Central Bohemian Region, Czech Republic
EZ89	Ústí nad Labem Region, Czech Republic
EZ90	Zlín Region, Czech Republic

== FI: Finland ==
FIPS Code	Region
FI01	Åland Province, Finland
FI06	Lapland Province, Finland
FI08	Oulu Province, Finland
FI13	Southern Finland Province, Finland
FI14	Eastern Finland Province, Finland
FI15	Western Finland Province, Finland

== FJ: Fiji ==
FIPS Code	Region
FJ01	Central Division, Fiji
FJ02	Eastern Division, Fiji
FJ03	Northern Division, Fiji
FJ04	Rotuma Dependency, Fiji
FJ05	Western Division, Fiji

== FM: Federated States of Micronesia ==
FIPS Code	Region
FM01	Kosrae State, Federated States of Micronesia
FM02	Pohnpei State, Federated States of Micronesia
FM03	Chuuk State, Federated States of Micronesia
FM04	Yap State, Federated States of Micronesia

== FR: France ==
FIPS Code	Region
FR97	Aquitaine Region, France
FR98	Auvergne Region, France
FR99	Lower Normandy Region, France
FRA1	Burgundy Region, France
FRA2	Brittany Region, France
FRA3	Centre Region, France
FRA4	Champagne-Ardenne Region, France
FRA5	Corsica Region, France
FRA6	Franche-Comté Region, France
FRA7	Upper Normandy Region, France
FRA8	Île-de-France Region, France
FRA9	Languedoc-Roussillon Region, France
FRB1	Limousin Region, France
FRB2	Lorraine Region, France
FRB3	Midi-Pyrénées Region, France
FRB4	Nord-Pas-de-Calais Region, France
FRB5	Pays de la Loire Region, France
FRB6	Picardy Region, France
FRB7	Poitou-Charentes Region, France
FRB8	Provence-Alpes-Côte d'Azur Region, France
FRB9	Rhône-Alpes Region, France
FRC1	Alsace Region, France

== See also ==
- List of FIPS region codes (A-C)
- List of FIPS region codes (G-I)
- List of FIPS region codes (J-L)
- List of FIPS region codes (M-O)
- List of FIPS region codes (P-R)
- List of FIPS region codes (S-U)
- List of FIPS region codes (V-Z)

== Sources ==
- FIPS 10-4 Codes and history
  - Last version of codes
  - All codes (include earlier versions)
  - Table to see the evolution of the codes over time
- Administrative Divisions of Countries ("Statoids"), Statoids.com
