= List of FIPS region codes (P–R) =

This is a list of FIPS 10-4 region codes from P-R, using a standardized name format, and cross-linking to articles.

On September 2, 2008, FIPS 10-4 was one of ten standards withdrawn by NIST as a Federal Information Processing Standard. The list here is the last version of codes. For earlier versions, see link below.

== PA: Paraguay ==
FIPS Code	Region
PA01	Alto Paraná Department, Paraguay
PA02	Amambay Department, Paraguay
PA04	Caaguazú Department, Paraguay
PA05	Caazapá Department, Paraguay
PA06	Central Department, Paraguay
PA07	Concepción Department, Paraguay
PA08	Cordillera Department, Paraguay
PA10	Guairá Department, Paraguay
PA11	Itapúa Department, Paraguay
PA12	Misiones Department, Paraguay
PA13	Ñeembucú Department, Paraguay
PA15	Paraguarí Department, Paraguay
PA16	Presidente Hayes Department, Paraguay
PA17	San Pedro Department, Paraguay
PA19	Canindeyú Department, Paraguay
PA22	Asunción Department, Paraguay
PA23	Alto Paraguay Department, Paraguay
PA24	Boquerón Department, Paraguay

== PE: Peru ==
FIPS Code	Region
PE01	Amazonas Region, Peru
PE02	Ancash Region, Peru
PE03	Apurímac Region, Peru
PE04	Arequipa Region, Peru
PE05	Ayacucho Region, Peru
PE06	Cajamarca Region, Peru
PE07	Callao Region, Peru
PE08	Cusco Region, Peru
PE09	Huancavelica Region, Peru
PE10	Huánuco Region, Peru
PE11	Ica Region, Peru
PE12	Junín Region, Peru
PE13	La Libertad Region, Peru
PE14	Lambayeque Region, Peru
PE15	Lima Region, Peru
PE16	Loreto Region, Peru
PE17	Madre de Dios Region, Peru
PE18	Moquegua Region, Peru
PE19	Pasco Region, Peru
PE20	Piura Region, Peru
PE21	Puno Region, Peru
PE22	San Martín Region, Peru
PE23	Tacna Region, Peru
PE24	Tumbes Region, Peru
PE25	Ucayali Region, Peru

== PK: Pakistan ==
FIPS Code	Region
PK02	Balochistan Province, Pakistan
PK03	Khyber Pakhtunkhwa Province
PK04	Punjab Province
PK05	Sindh Province
PK06	Azad Jammu and Kashmir Autonomous Territory
PK07	Gilgit-Baltistan Autonomous Territory
PK08	Islamabad Federal Territory

== PL: Poland ==
FIPS Code	Region
PL72	Dolnośląskie Province, Poland
PL73	Kujawsko-Pomorskie Province, Poland
PL74	Łódzkie Province, Poland
PL75	Lubelskie Province, Poland
PL76	Lubuskie Province, Poland
PL77	Małopolskie Province, Poland
PL78	Mazowieckie Province, Poland
PL79	Opolskie Province, Poland
PL80	Podkarpackie Province, Poland
PL81	Podlaskie Province, Poland
PL82	Pomorskie Province, Poland
PL83	Śląskie Province, Poland
PL84	Świętokrzyskie Province, Poland
PL85	Warmińsko-Mazurskie Province, Poland
PL86	Wielkopolskie Province, Poland
PL87	Zachodniopomorskie Province, Poland

== PM: Panama ==
FIPS Code	Region
PM01	Bocas del Toro Province, Panama
PM02	Chiriquí Province, Panama
PM03	Coclé Province, Panama
PM04	Colón Province, Panama
PM05	Darién Province, Panama
PM06	Herrera Province, Panama
PM07	Los Santos Province, Panama
PM08	Panamá Province, Panama
PM09	San Blas Territory, Panama
PM10	Veraguas Province, Panama

== PO: Portugal ==
FIPS Code	Region
PO02	Aveiro District, Portugal
PO03	Beja District, Portugal
PO04	Braga District, Portugal
PO05	Bragança District, Portugal
PO06	Castelo Branco District, Portugal
PO07	Coimbra District, Portugal
PO08	Évora District, Portugal
PO09	Faro District, Portugal
PO10	Madeira Autonomous Region, Portugal
PO11	Guarda District, Portugal
PO13	Leiria District, Portugal
PO14	Lisboa District, Portugal
PO16	Portalegre District, Portugal
PO17	Porto District, Portugal
PO18	Santarém District, Portugal
PO19	Setúbal District, Portugal
PO20	Viana do Castelo District, Portugal
PO21	Vila Real District, Portugal
PO22	Viseu District, Portugal
PO23	Açores Autonomous Region, Portugal

== PP: Papua New Guinea ==
FIPS Code	Region
PP01	Central Province, Papua New Guinea
PP02	Gulf Province, Papua New Guinea
PP03	Milne Bay Province, Papua New Guinea
PP04	Northern Province, Papua New Guinea
PP05	Southern Highlands Province (as before 2002, including the newer Hela Province), Papua New Guinea
PP06	Western Province (as before 2002, including the newer Jiwaka Province), Papua New Guinea
PP07	Bougainville Province (now the Autonomous Region of Bougainville), Papua New Guinea
PP08	Chimbu Province, Papua New Guinea
PP09	Eastern Highlands Province, Papua New Guinea
PP10	East New Britain Province, Papua New Guinea
PP11	East Sepik Province, Papua New Guinea
PP12	Madang Province, Papua New Guinea
PP13	Manus Province, Papua New Guinea
PP14	Morobe Province, Papua New Guinea
PP15	New Ireland Province, Papua New Guinea
PP16	Western Highlands Province, Papua New Guinea
PP17	West New Britain Province, Papua New Guinea
PP18	Sandaun Province, Papua New Guinea
PP19	Enga Province, Papua New Guinea
PP20	National Capital Province, Papua New Guinea

== PS: Palau ==
FIPS Code	Region
PS01	Aimelik, Palau
PS02	Airai
PS03	Angaur
PS04	Hatohobei
PS05	Kayangel
PS06	Koror
PS07	Melekeok
PS08	Ngaraard
PS09	Ngarchelong
PS10	Ngardmau
PS11	Ngatpang
PS12	Ngchesar
PS13	Ngeremlengui
PS14	Ngiwal
PS15	Peleliu
PS16	Sonsorol

== PU: Guinea-Bissau ==
FIPS Code	Region
PU01	Bafatá Region, Guinea-Bissau
PU02	Quinara Region, Guinea-Bissau
PU04	Oio Region, Guinea-Bissau
PU05	Bolama Region, Guinea-Bissau
PU06	Cacheu Region, Guinea-Bissau
PU07	Tombali Region, Guinea-Bissau
PU10	Gabú Region, Guinea-Bissau
PU11	Bissau Region, Guinea-Bissau
PU12	Biombo Region, Guinea-Bissau

== QA: Qatar ==
FIPS Code	Region
QA01	Ad Dawḩah Municipality, Qatar
QA02	Al Ghuwariyah Municipality, Qatar
QA03	Al Jumaylīyah Municipality, Qatar
QA04	Al Khawr Municipality, Qatar
QA06	Ar Rayyan Municipality, Qatar
QA08	Al Shamāl Municipality, Qatar
QA09	Umm Şalāl Municipality, Qatar
QA10	Al Wakrah Municipality, Qatar
QA11	Jariyan al Batnah Municipality, Qatar
QA12	Mesaieed Municipality, Qatar

== RO: Romania ==
FIPS Code	Region
RO01	Alba County, Romania
RO02	Arad County, Romania
RO03	Argeș County, Romania
RO04	Bacău County, Romania
RO05	Bihor County, Romania
RO06	Bistrița-Năsăud County, Romania
RO07	Botoșani County, Romania
RO08	Brăila County, Romania
RO09	Brașov County, Romania
RO10	București Municipality, Romania
RO11	Buzău County, Romania
RO12	Caraș-Severin County, Romania
RO13	Cluj County, Romania
RO14	Constanța County, Romania
RO15	Covasna County, Romania
RO16	Dâmbovița County, Romania
RO17	Dolj County, Romania
RO18	Galați County, Romania
RO19	Gorj County, Romania
RO20	Harghita County, Romania
RO21	Hunedoara County, Romania
RO22	Ialomița County, Romania
RO23	Iași County, Romania
RO25	Maramureș County, Romania
RO26	Mehedinți County, Romania
RO27	Mureș County, Romania
RO28	Neamț County, Romania
RO29	Olt County, Romania
RO30	Prahova County, Romania
RO31	Sălaj County, Romania
RO32	Satu Mare County, Romania
RO33	Sibiu County, Romania
RO34	Suceava County, Romania
RO35	Teleorman County, Romania
RO36	Timiș County, Romania
RO37	Tulcea County, Romania
RO38	Vaslui County, Romania
RO39	Vâlcea County, Romania
RO40	Vrancea County, Romania
RO41	Călărași County, Romania
RO42	Giurgiu County, Romania
RO43	Ilfov County, Romania

== RP: Philippines ==
FIPS Code	Region
RP01	Abra Province, Philippines
RP02	Agusan del Norte Province, Philippines
RP03	Agusan del Sur Province, Philippines
RP04	Aklan Province, Philippines
RP05	Albay Province, Philippines
RP06	Antique Province, Philippines
RP07	Bataan Province, Philippines
RP08	Batanes Province, Philippines
RP09	Batangas Province, Philippines
RP10	Benguet Province, Philippines
RP11	Bohol Province, Philippines
RP12	Bukidnon Province, Philippines
RP13	Bulacan Province, Philippines
RP14	Cagayan Province, Philippines
RP15	Camarines Norte Province, Philippines
RP16	Camarines Sur Province, Philippines
RP17	Camiguin Province, Philippines
RP18	Capiz Province, Philippines
RP19	Catanduanes Province, Philippines
RP20	Cavite Province, Philippines
RP21	Cebu Province, Philippines
RP22	Basilan Province, Philippines
RP23	Eastern Samar Province, Philippines
RP24	Davao del Norte Province, Philippines
RP25	Davao del Sur Province, Philippines
RP26	Davao Oriental Province, Philippines
RP27	Ifugao Province, Philippines
RP28	Ilocos Norte Province, Philippines
RP29	Ilocos Sur Province, Philippines
RP30	Iloilo Province, Philippines
RP31	Isabela Province, Philippines
RP32	Kalinga-Apayao Province, Philippines
RP33	Laguna Province, Philippines
RP34	Lanao del Norte Province, Philippines
RP35	Lanao del Sur Province, Philippines
RP36	La Union Province, Philippines
RP37	Leyte Province, Philippines
RP38	Marinduque Province, Philippines
RP39	Masbate Province, Philippines
RP40	Mindoro Occidental Province, Philippines
RP41	Mindoro Oriental Province, Philippines
RP42	Misamis Occidental Province, Philippines
RP43	Misamis Oriental Province, Philippines
RP44	Mountain Province, Philippines
RP45	Negros Occidental Province, Philippines
RP46	Negros Oriental Province, Philippines
RP47	Nueva Ecija Province, Philippines
RP48	Nueva Vizcaya Province, Philippines
RP49	Palawan Province, Philippines
RP50	Pampanga Province, Philippines
RP51	Pangasinan Province, Philippines
RP53	Rizal Province, Philippines
RP54	Romblon Province, Philippines
RP55	(Western) Samar Province, Philippines
RP56	Maguindanao Province, Philippines
RP57	(North) Cotabato Province, Philippines
RP58	Sorsogon Province, Philippines
RP59	Southern Leyte Province, Philippines
RP60	Sulu Province, Philippines
RP61	Surigao del Norte Province, Philippines
RP62	Surigao del Sur Province, Philippines
RP63	Tarlac Province, Philippines
RP64	Zambales Province, Philippines
RP65	Zamboanga del Norte Province, Philippines
RP66	Zamboanga del Sur Province, Philippines
RP67	Northern Samar Province, Philippines
RP68	Quirino Province, Philippines
RP69	Siquijor Province, Philippines
RP70	South Cotabato Province, Philippines
RP71	Sultan Kudarat Province, Philippines
RP72	Tawi-Tawi Province, Philippines
RPA1	Angeles Chartered City, Philippines
RPA2	Bacolod Chartered City, Philippines
RPA3	Bago Chartered City, Philippines
RPA4	Baguio Chartered City, Philippines
RPA5	Bais Chartered City, Philippines
RPA6	Basilan Chartered City, Philippines
RPA7	Batangas Province, Philippines
RPA8	Butuan Chartered City, Philippines
RPA9	Cabanatuan Chartered City, Philippines
RPB1	Cadiz Chartered City, Philippines
RPB2	Cagayan de Oro Chartered City, Philippines
RPB3	Calbayog Chartered City, Philippines
RPB4	Caloocan Chartered City, Philippines
RPB5	Canlaon Chartered City, Philippines
RPB6	Cavite Chartered City, Philippines
RPB7	Cebu Chartered City, Philippines
RPB8	Cotabato Chartered City, Philippines
RPB9	Dagupan Chartered City, Philippines
RPC1	Danao Chartered City, Philippines
RPC2	Dapitan Chartered City, Philippines
RPC3	Davao Chartered City, Philippines
RPC4	Dipolog Chartered City, Philippines
RPC5	Dumaguete Chartered City, Philippines
RPC6	General Santos Chartered City, Philippines
RPC7	Gingoog Chartered City, Philippines
RPC8	Iligan Chartered City, Philippines
RPC9	Iloilo Chartered City, Philippines
RPD1	Iriga Chartered City, Philippines
RPD2	La Carlota Chartered City, Philippines
RPD3	Laoag Chartered City, Philippines
RPD4	Lapu-Lapu Chartered City, Philippines
RPD5	Legazpi Chartered City, Philippines
RPD6	Lipa Chartered City, Philippines
RPD7	Lucena Chartered City, Philippines
RPD8	Mandaue Chartered City, Philippines
RPD9	Manila Chartered City, Philippines
RPE1	Marawi Chartered City, Philippines
RPE2	Naga Chartered City, Philippines
RPE3	Olongapo Chartered City, Philippines
RPE4	Ormoc Chartered City, Philippines
RPE5	Oroquieta Chartered City, Philippines
RPE6	Ozamiz Chartered City, Philippines
RPE7	Pagadian Chartered City, Philippines
RPE8	Palayan Chartered City, Philippines
RPE9	Pasay Chartered City, Philippines
RPF1	Puerto Princesa Chartered City, Philippines
RPF2	Quezon Chartered City, Philippines
RPF3	Roxas Chartered City, Philippines
RPF4	San Carlos, Negros Occidental, Chartered City, Philippines
RPF5	San Carlos, Pangasinan, Chartered City, Philippines
RPF6	San Jose Chartered City, Philippines
RPF7	San Pablo Chartered City, Philippines
RPF8	Silay Chartered City, Philippines
RPF9	Surigao Chartered City, Philippines
RPG1	Tacloban Chartered City, Philippines
RPG2	Tagaytay Chartered City, Philippines
RPG3	Tagbilaran Chartered City, Philippines
RPG4	Tangub Chartered City, Philippines
RPG5	Toledo Chartered City, Philippines
RPG6	Trece Martires Chartered City, Philippines
RPG7	Zamboanga Chartered City, Philippines
RPG8	Aurora Province, Philippines
RPH2	Quezon Province, Philippines
RPH3	Negros Occidental Province, Philippines

== RS: Russia ==
FIPS Code	Region
RS01	Adygeya Republic, Russia
RS02	Aginskiy Buryatskiy Avtonomnyy Okrug, Russia
RS03	Altay Republic, Russia
RS04	Altayskiy Kray, Russia
RS05	Amurskaya Oblast', Russia
RS06	Arkhangel'skaya Oblast', Russia
RS07	Astrakhanskaya Oblast', Russia
RS08	Bashkortostan Republic, Russia
RS09	Belgorodskaya Oblast', Russia
RS10	Bryanskaya Oblast', Russia
RS11	Buryatiya Republic, Russia
RS12	Chechnya Republic, Russia
RS13	Chelyabinskaya Oblast', Russia
RS14	Chitinskaya Oblast', Russia
RS15	Chukotskiy Avtonomnyy Okrug, Russia
RS16	Chuvashiya Republic, Russia
RS17	Dagestan Republic, Russia
RS19	Ingushetiya Republic, Russia
RS20	Irkutskaya Oblast', Russia
RS21	Ivanovskaya Oblast', Russia
RS22	Kabardino-Balkariya Republic, Russia
RS23	Kaliningradskaya Oblast', Russia
RS24	Kalmykiya Republic, Russia
RS25	Kaluzhskaya Oblast', Russia
RS27	Karachayevo-Cherkesiya Republic, Russia
RS28	Kareliya Republic, Russia
RS29	Kemerovskaya Oblast', Russia
RS30	Khabarovskiy Kray, Russia
RS31	Khakasiya Republic, Russia
RS32	Khanty-Mansiyskiy Avtonomnyy Okrug, Russia
RS33	Kirovskaya Oblast', Russia
RS34	Komi Republic, Russia
RS37	Kostromskaya Oblast', Russia
RS38	Krasnodarskiy Kray, Russia
RS40	Kurganskaya Oblast', Russia
RS41	Kurskaya Oblast', Russia
RS42	Leningradskaya Oblast', Russia
RS43	Lipetskaya Oblast', Russia
RS44	Magadanskaya Oblast', Russia
RS45	Mariy-El Republic, Russia
RS46	Mordoviya Republic, Russia
RS47	Moskovskaya Oblast', Russia
RS48	Moskva Federal City, Russia
RS49	Murmanskaya Oblast', Russia
RS50	Nenetskiy Avtonomnyy Okrug, Russia
RS51	Nizhegorodskaya Oblast', Russia
RS52	Novgorodskaya Oblast', Russia
RS53	Novosibirskaya Oblast', Russia
RS54	Omskaya Oblast', Russia
RS55	Orenburgskaya Oblast', Russia
RS56	Orlovskaya Oblast', Russia
RS57	Penzenskaya Oblast', Russia
RS59	Primorskiy Kray, Russia
RS60	Pskovskaya Oblast', Russia
RS61	Rostovskaya Oblast', Russia
RS62	Ryazanskaya Oblast', Russia
RS63	Sakha (Yakutiya) Republic, Russia
RS64	Sakhalinskaya Oblast', Russia
RS65	Samarskaya Oblast', Russia
RS66	Sankt-Peterburg Federal City, Russia
RS67	Saratovskaya Oblast', Russia
RS68	Severnaya Osetiya-Alaniya Respublika, Russia
RS69	Smolenskaya Oblast', Russia
RS70	Stavropol'skiy Kray, Russia
RS71	Sverdlovskaya Oblast', Russia
RS72	Tambovskaya Oblast', Russia
RS73	Tatarstan Republic, Russia
RS75	Tomskaya Oblast', Russia
RS76	Tul'skaya Oblast', Russia
RS77	Tverskaya Oblast', Russia
RS78	Tyumenskaya Oblast', Russia
RS79	Tyva Republic, Russia
RS80	Udmurtiya Republic, Russia
RS81	Ul'yanovskaya Oblast', Russia
RS82	Ust'-Ordynskiy Buryatskiy Avtonomnyy Okrug, Russia
RS83:	Vladimirskaya Oblast', Russia
RS84	Volgogradskaya Oblast', Russia
RS85	Vologodskaya Oblast', Russia
RS86	Voronezhskaya Oblast', Russia
RS87	Yamalo-Nenetskiy Avtonomnyy Okrug, Russia
RS88	Yaroslavskaya Oblast', Russia
RS89	Yevreyskaya Avtonomnaya Oblast', Russia
RS90	Permskiy Kray, Russia
RS91	Krasnoyarskiy Kray, Russia
RS92	Kamchatskiy Kray, Russia

== RW: Rwanda ==
FIPS Code	Region
RW11	Eastern Province, Rwanda
RW12	Kigali, Rwanda
RW13	Northern Province, Rwanda
RW14	Western Province, Rwanda
RW15	Southern Province, Rwanda

== See also ==
- List of FIPS region codes (A-C)
- List of FIPS region codes (D-F)
- List of FIPS region codes (G-I)
- List of FIPS region codes (J-L)
- List of FIPS region codes (M-O)
- List of FIPS region codes (S-U)
- List of FIPS region codes (V-Z)

== Sources ==
- FIPS 10-4 Codes and history
  - Last version of codes
  - All codes (include earlier versions)
  - Table to see the evolution of the codes over time
- Administrative Divisions of Countries ("Statoids"), Statoids.com
