= ISO 3166-2:ZW =

Entry for Zimbabwe in ISO 3166-2

ISO 3166-2:ZW is the entry for Zimbabwe in ISO 3166-2, part of the ISO 3166 standard published by the International Organization for Standardization (ISO), which defines codes for the names of the principal subdivisions (e.g., provinces or states) of all countries coded in ISO 3166-1.

Currently for Zimbabwe, ISO 3166-2 codes are defined for ten provinces.

Each code consists of two parts separated by a hyphen. The first part is ZW, the ISO 3166-1 alpha-2 code of Zimbabwe. The second part is two letters.

== Current codes ==
Subdivision names are listed as in the ISO 3166-2 standard published by the ISO 3166 Maintenance Agency (ISO 3166/MA).

Click on the button in the header to sort each column.

Code	Subdivision name (en)
ZW-BU	Bulawayo
ZW-HA	Harare
ZW-MA	Manicaland
ZW-MC	Mashonaland Central
ZW-ME	Mashonaland East
ZW-MW	Mashonaland West
ZW-MV	Masvingo
ZW-MN	Matabeleland North
ZW-MS	Matabeleland South
ZW-MI	Midlands

== See also ==
- Subdivisions of Zimbabwe
- FIPS region codes of Zimbabwe
- Neighbouring countries: BW, MZ, ZA, ZM
