= ISO 3166-2:AO =

Entry for Angola in ISO 3166-2

ISO 3166-2:AO is the entry for Angola in ISO 3166-2, part of the ISO 3166 standard published by the International Organization for Standardization (ISO), which defines codes for the names of the principal subdivisions (e.g., provinces or states) of all countries coded in ISO 3166-1.

Currently for Angola, ISO 3166-2 codes are defined for 18 provinces.

Each code consists of two parts, separated by a hyphen. The first part is AO, the ISO 3166-1 alpha-2 code of Angola. The second part is three letters.

== Current codes ==
Subdivision names are listed as in the ISO 3166-2 standard published by the ISO 3166 Maintenance Agency (ISO 3166/MA).

Click on the button in the header to sort each column.

Code	Subdivision name (pt)	Local variant	Subdivision name (kg) (Note: For reference only, Kikongo name not included in the ISO 3166-2 standard.)	Subdivision name (en) (Note: For reference only, English name not included in the ISO 3166-2 standard.)
AO-BGO	Bengo		Bengo	Bengo
AO-BGU	Benguela		Bengela	Benguela
AO-BIE	Bié		Biye	Bie
AO-CAB	Cabinda		Kabinda	Cabinda
AO-CCU	Cuando Cubango	Kuando Kubango	Kuando Kubango	Cuando Cubango
AO-CNO	Cuanza-Norte	Kwanza Norte	Kuanza Node	North Cuanza
AO-CUS	Cuanza-Sul	Kwanza Sul	Kuanza Sudi	South Cuanza
AO-CNN	Cunene		Kunene	Cunene
AO-HUA	Huambo		Wambu	Huambo
AO-HUI	Huíla		Wila	Huila
AO-LUA	Luanda		Luanda	Luanda
AO-LNO	Lunda-Norte		Lunda Node	North Lunda
AO-LSU	Lunda-Sul		Lunda Sudi	South Lunda
AO-MAL	Malange		Malanzi	Malanje
AO-MOX	Moxico		Musiku	Moxico
AO-NAM	Namibe		Namibe	Namibe
AO-UIG	Uíge		Wizi	Uige
AO-ZAI	Zaire		Nzâdi	Zaire

== Changes ==
The following changes to the entry have been announced in newsletters by the ISO 3166/MA since the first publication of ISO 3166-2 in 1998. ISO stopped issuing newsletters in 2013.

Newsletter	Date issued	Description of change in newsletter
Newsletter I-2	2002-05-21	Spelling correction in AO-ZAI

The following changes to the entry are listed on ISO's online catalogue, the Online Browsing Platform:

Effective date of change	Short description of change (en)
2014-10-29	Change spelling of AO-CNO, AO-CUS, and AO-CCU; update List Source
2014-12-18	Correct spelling of AO-CNO and AO-CUS
2015-02-12	Correct spelling of AO-CCU
2015-11-27	Update List Source
2020-11-24	Change of spelling of AO-CCU, AO-CNO, AO-CUS, AO-LNO, AO-LSU; Addition of local variation for AO-CCU, AO-CNO, AO-CUS; Update List Source

== See also ==
- Subdivisions of Angola
- FIPS region codes of Angola
- Neighbouring countries: CD, CG, NA, ZM
