= List of FIPS region codes (S–U) =

This is a list of FIPS 10-4 region codes from S-U, using a standardized name format, and cross-linking to articles.

On September 2, 2008, FIPS 10-4 was one of ten standards withdrawn by NIST as a Federal Information Processing Standard. The list here is the last version of codes. For earlier versions, see link below.

== SA: Saudi Arabia ==
FIPS Code	Region
SA02:	Al Bāḩah Province, Saudi Arabia
SA05	Al Madīnah Province, Saudi Arabia
SA06	Ash Sharqīyah Province, Saudi Arabia
SA08	Al Qaşīm Province, Saudi Arabia
SA10	Ar Riyāḑ Province, Saudi Arabia
SA11	'Asir Province, Saudi Arabia
SA13	Ḩā'il Province, Saudi Arabia
SA14	Makkah Province, Saudi Arabia
SA15	Al Ḩudūd ash Shamālīyah Province, Saudi Arabia
SA16	Najran Province, Saudi Arabia
SA17	Jīzān Province, Saudi Arabia
SA19	Tabūk Province, Saudi Arabia
SA20	Al Jawf Province, Saudi Arabia

== SC: Saint Kitts and Nevis ==
FIPS Code	Region
SC01	Christ Church Nichola Town Parish, Saint Kitts and Nevis
SC02	Saint Anne Sandy Point Parish, Saint Kitts and Nevis
SC03	Saint George Basseterre Parish, Saint Kitts and Nevis
SC04	Saint George Gingerland Parish, Saint Kitts and Nevis
SC05	Saint James Windward Parish, Saint Kitts and Nevis
SC06	Saint John Capesterre Parish, Saint Kitts and Nevis
SC07	Saint John Figtree Parish, Saint Kitts and Nevis
SC08	Saint Mary Cayon Parish, Saint Kitts and Nevis
SC09	Saint Paul Capesterre Parish, Saint Kitts and Nevis
SC10	Saint Paul Charlestown Parish, Saint Kitts and Nevis
SC11	Saint Peter Basseterre Parish, Saint Kitts and Nevis
SC12	Saint Thomas Lowland Parish, Saint Kitts and Nevis
SC13	Saint Thomas Middle Island Parish, Saint Kitts and Nevis
SC15	Trinity Palmetto Point Parish, Saint Kitts and Nevis

== SE: Seychelles ==
FIPS Code	Region
SE01	Anse aux Pins District, Seychelles
SE02	Anse Boileau District, Seychelles
SE03	Anse Etoile District, Seychelles
SE05	Anse Royale District, Seychelles
SE06	Baie Lazare District, Seychelles
SE07	Baie Sainte Anne District, Seychelles
SE08	Beau Vallon District, Seychelles
SE09	Bel Air District, Seychelles
SE10	Bel Ombre District, Seychelles
SE11	Cascade District, Seychelles
SE12	Glacis District, Seychelles
SE14	Grand' Anse (Praslin) District, Seychelles
SE17	Mont Buxton District, Seychelles
SE18	Mont Fleuri District, Seychelles
SE19	Plaisance District, Seychelles
SE20	Pointe La Rue District, Seychelles
SE22	Saint Louis District, Seychelles
SE23	Takamaka District, Seychelles
SE24	Grand Anse Mahe District, Seychelles
SE25	Inner Islands District, Seychelles
SE26	English River District, Seychelles
SE27	Port Glaud District, Seychelles
SE28	Au Cap District, Seychelles
SE29	Les Mamelles District, Seychelles
SE30	Roche Caiman District, Seychelles

== SF: South Africa ==
FIPS Code	Region
SF02	KwaZulu-Natal, South Africa
SF03	Free State, South Africa
SF05	Eastern Cape, South Africa
SF06	Gauteng, South Africa
SF07	Mpumalanga, South Africa
SF08	Northern Cape, South Africa
SF09	Limpopo, South Africa
SF10	North West, South Africa
SF11	Western Cape, South Africa

== SG: Senegal ==
FIPS Code	Region
SG01	Dakar Region, Senegal
SG03	Diourbel Region, Senegal
SG05	Tambacounda Region, Senegal
SG07	Thiès Region, Senegal
SG09	Fatick Region, Senegal
SG10	Kaolack Region, Senegal
SG11	Kolda Region, Senegal
SG12	Ziguinchor Region, Senegal
SG13	Louga Region, Senegal
SG14	Saint-Louis Region, Senegal
SG15	Matam Region, Senegal

== SH: Saint Helena ==
FIPS Code	Region
SH01	Ascension, Saint Helena
SH02	Saint Helena, Saint Helena
SH03	Tristan da Cunha, Saint Helena

== SI: Slovenia ==
FIPS Code	Region
SI01	Municipality of Ajdovščina, Slovenia
SI02	Municipality of Beltinci, Slovenia
SI03	Municipality of Bled, Slovenia
SI04	Municipality of Bohinj, Slovenia
SI05	Municipality of Borovnica, Slovenia
SI06	Municipality of Bovec, Slovenia
SI07	Municipality of Brda, Slovenia
SI08	Municipality of Brežice, Slovenia
SI09	Municipality of Brezovica, Slovenia
SI11	City Municipality of Celje, Slovenia
SI12	Municipality of Cerklje na Gorenjskem, Slovenia
SI13	Municipality of Cerknica, Slovenia
SI14	Municipality of Cerkno, Slovenia
SI15	Municipality of Črenšovci, Slovenia
SI16	Municipality of Črna na Koroškem, Slovenia
SI17	Municipality of Črnomelj, Slovenia
SI19	Municipality of Divača, Slovenia
SI20	Municipality of Dobrepolje, Slovenia
SI22	Municipality of Dol pri Ljubljani, Slovenia
SI24	Municipality of Dornava, Slovenia
SI25	Municipality of Dravograd, Slovenia
SI26	Municipality of Duplek, Slovenia
SI27	Municipality of Gorenja Vas-Poljane, Slovenia
SI28	Municipality of Gorišnica, Slovenia
SI29	Municipality of Gornja Radgona, Slovenia
SI30	Municipality of Gornji Grad, Slovenia
SI31	Municipality of Gornji Petrovci, Slovenia
SI32	Municipality of Grosuplje, Slovenia
SI34	Municipality of Hrastnik, Slovenia
SI35	Municipality of Hrpelje-Kozina, Slovenia
SI36	Municipality of Idrija, Slovenia
SI37	Municipality of Ig, Slovenia
SI38	Municipality of Ilirska Bistrica, Slovenia
SI39	Municipality of Ivančna Gorica, Slovenia
SI40	Municipality of Izola-Isola, Slovenia
SI42	Municipality of Juršinci, Slovenia
SI44	Municipality of Kanal, Slovenia
SI45	Municipality of Kidričevo, Slovenia
SI46	Municipality of Kobarid, Slovenia
SI47	Municipality of Kobilje, Slovenia
SI49	Municipality of Komen, Slovenia
SI50	City Municipality of Koper-Capodistria, Slovenia
SI51	Municipality of Kozje, Slovenia
SI52	Municipality of Kranj, Slovenia
SI53	Municipality of Kranjska Gora, Slovenia
SI54	Municipality of Krško, Slovenia
SI55	Municipality of Kungota, Slovenia
SI57	Municipality of Laško, Slovenia
SI61	City Municipality of Ljubljana, Slovenia
SI62	Municipality of Ljubno, Slovenia
SI64	Municipality of Logatec, Slovenia
SI66	Municipality of Loški Potok, Slovenia
SI68	Municipality of Lukovica, Slovenia
SI71	Municipality of Medvode, Slovenia
SI72	Municipality of Mengeš, Slovenia
SI73	Municipality of Metlika, Slovenia
SI74	Municipality of Mežica, Slovenia
SI76	Municipality of Mislinja, Slovenia
SI77	Municipality of Moravče, Slovenia
SI78	Municipality of Moravske Toplice, Slovenia
SI79	Municipality of Mozirje, Slovenia
SI80	City Municipality of Murska Sobota, Slovenia
SI81	Municipality of Muta, Slovenia
SI82	Municipality of Naklo, Slovenia
SI83	Municipality of Nazarje, Slovenia
SI84	City Municipality of Nova Gorica, Slovenia
SI86	Municipality of Odranci, Slovenia
SI87	Municipality of Ormož, Slovenia
SI88	Municipality of Osilnica, Slovenia
SI89	Municipality of Pesnica, Slovenia
SI91	Municipality of Pivka, Slovenia
SI92	Municipality of Podčetrtek, Slovenia
SI94	Municipality of Postojna, Slovenia
SI97	Municipality of Puconci, Slovenia
SI98	Municipality of Rače-Fram, Slovenia
SI99	Municipality of Radeče, Slovenia
SIA1	Municipality of Radenci, Slovenia
SIA2	Municipality of Radlje ob Dravi, Slovenia
SIA3	Municipality of Radovljica, Slovenia
SIA6	Municipality of Rogašovci, Slovenia
SIA7	Municipality of Rogaška Slatina, Slovenia
SIA8	Municipality of Rogatec, Slovenia
SIB1	Municipality of Semič, Slovenia
SIB2	Municipality of Šenčur, Slovenia
SIB3	Municipality of Šentilj, Slovenia
SIB4	Municipality of Šentjernej, Slovenia
SIB6	Municipality of Sevnica, Slovenia
SIB7	Municipality of Sežana, Slovenia
SIB8	Municipality of Škocjan, Slovenia
SIB9	Municipality of Škofja Loka, Slovenia
SIC1	Municipality of Škofljica, Slovenia
SIC2	City Municipality of Slovenj Gradec, Slovenia
SIC4	Municipality of Slovenske Konjice, Slovenia
SIC5	Municipality of Šmarje pri Jelšah, Slovenia
SIC6	Municipality of Šmartno ob Paki, Slovenia
SIC7	Municipality of Šoštanj, Slovenia
SIC8	Municipality of Starše, Slovenia
SIC9	Municipality of Štore, Slovenia
SID1	Municipality of Sveti Jurij, Slovenia
SID2	Municipality of Tolmin, Slovenia
SID3	Municipality of Trbovlje, Slovenia
SID4	Municipality of Trebnje, Slovenia
SID5	Municipality of Tržič, Slovenia
SID6	Municipality of Turnišče, Slovenia
SID7	City Municipality of Velenje, Slovenia
SID8	Municipality of Velike Lašče, Slovenia
SIE1	Municipality of Vipava, Slovenia
SIE2	Municipality of Vitanje, Slovenia
SIE3	Municipality of Vodice, Slovenia
SIE5	Municipality of Vrhnika, Slovenia
SIE6	Municipality of Vuzenica, Slovenia
SIE7	Municipality of Zagorje ob Savi, Slovenia
SIE9	Municipality of Zavrč, Slovenia
SIF1	Municipality of Železniki, Slovenia
SIF2	Municipality of Žiri, Slovenia
SIF3	Municipality of Zreče, Slovenia
SIF4	Municipality of Benedikt, Slovenia
SIF5	Municipality of Bistrica ob Sotli, Slovenia
SIF6	Municipality of Bloke, Slovenia
SIF7	Municipality of Braslovče, Slovenia
SIF8:	Municipality of Cankova, Slovenia
SIF9	Municipality of Cerkvenjak, Slovenia
SIG1	Municipality of Destrnik, Slovenia
SIG2	Municipality of Dobje, Slovenia
SIG3	Municipality of Dobrna, Slovenia
SIG4	Municipality of Dobrova-Polhov Gradec, Slovenia
SIG5	Municipality of Dobrovnik+Dobronak, Slovenia
SIG6	Municipality of Dolenjske Toplice, Slovenia
SIG7	Municipality of Domžale, Slovenia
SIG8	Municipality of Grad, Slovenia
SIG9	Municipality of Hajdina, Slovenia
SIH1	Municipality of Hoče-Slivnica, Slovenia
SIH2	Municipality of Hodoš-Hodos, Slovenia
SIH3	Municipality of Horjul, Slovenia
SIH4	Municipality of Jesenice, Slovenia
SIH5	Municipality of Jezersko, Slovenia
SIH6	Municipality of Kamnik, Slovenia
SIH7	Municipality of Kočevje, Slovenia
SIH8	Municipality of Komenda, Slovenia
SIH9	Municipality of Kostel, Slovenia
SII1	Municipality of Križevci, Slovenia
SII2	Municipality of Kuzma, Slovenia
SII3	Municipality of Lenart, Slovenia
SII4	Municipality of Lendava-Lendva, Slovenia
SII5	Municipality of Litija, Slovenia
SII6	Municipality of Ljutomer, Slovenia
SII7	Municipality of Loška Dolina, Slovenia
SII8	Municipality of Lovrenc na Pohorju, Slovenia
SII9	Municipality of Luče, Slovenia
SIJ1	Municipality of Majšperk, Slovenia
SIJ2	Municipality of Maribor, Slovenia
SIJ3	Municipality of Markovci, Slovenia
SIJ4	Municipality of Miklavž na Dravskem Polju, Slovenia
SIJ5	Municipality of Miren-Kostanjevica, Slovenia
SIJ6	Municipality of Mirna Peč, Slovenia
SIJ7	City Municipality of Novo Mesto, Slovenia
SIJ8	Municipality of Oplotnica, Slovenia
SIJ9	Municipality of Piran-Pirano, Slovenia
SIK1	Municipality of Podlehnik, Slovenia
SIK2	Municipality of Podvelka, Slovenia
SIK3	Municipality of Polzela, Slovenia
SIK4	Municipality of Prebold, Slovenia
SIK5	Municipality of Preddvor, Slovenia
SIK6	Municipality of Prevalje, Slovenia
SIK7	City Municipality of Ptuj, Slovenia
SIK8	Municipality of Ravne na Koroškem, Slovenia
SIK9	Municipality of Razkrižje, Slovenia
SIL1	Municipality of Ribnica, Slovenia
SIL2	Municipality of Ribnica na Pohorju, Slovenia
SIL3	Municipality of Ruše, Slovenia
SIL4	Municipality of Šalovci, Slovenia
SIL5	Municipality of Selnica ob Dravi, Slovenia
SIL6	Municipality of Šempeter-Vrtojba, Slovenia
SIL7	Municipality of Šentjur, Slovenia
SIL8	Municipality of Slovenska Bistrica, Slovenia
SIL9	Municipality of Šmartno pri Litiji, Slovenia
SIM1	Municipality of Sodražica, Slovenia
SIM2	Municipality of Solčava, Slovenia
SIM3	Municipality of Sveta Ana, Slovenia
SIM4	Municipality of Sveti Andraž v Slovenskih Goricah, Slovenia
SIM5	Municipality of Tabor, Slovenia
SIM6	Municipality of Tišina, Slovenia
SIM7	Municipality of Trnovska Vas, Slovenia
SIM8	Municipality of Trzin, Slovenia
SIM9	Municipality of Velika Polana, Slovenia
SIN1	Municipality of Veržej, Slovenia
SIN2	Municipality of Videm, Slovenia
SIN3	Municipality of Vojnik, Slovenia
SIN4	Municipality of Vransko, Slovenia
SIN5	Municipality of Žalec, Slovenia
SIN6	Municipality of Žetale, Slovenia
SIN7	Municipality of Žirovnica, Slovenia
SIN8	Municipality of Žužemberk, Slovenia

== SL: Sierra Leone ==
FIPS Code	Region
SL01	Eastern Province, Sierra Leone
SL02	Northern Province, Sierra Leone
SL03	Southern Province, Sierra Leone
SL04	Western Area, Sierra Leone

== SM: San Marino ==
FIPS Code	Region
SM01	Acquaviva Municipality, San Marino
SM02	Chiesanuova Municipality, San Marino
SM03	Domagnano Municipality, San Marino
SM04	Faetano Municipality, San Marino
SM05	Fiorentino Municipality, San Marino
SM06	Borgo Maggiore Municipality, San Marino
SM07	San Marino Municipality, San Marino
SM08	Montegiardino Municipality, San Marino
SM09	Serravalle Municipality, San Marino

== SO: Somalia ==
FIPS Code	Region
SO01	Bakool Region, Somalia
SO02	Banaadir Region, Somalia
SO03	Bari Region, Somalia
SO04	Bay Region, Somalia
SO05	Galguduud Region, Somalia
SO06	Gedo Region, Somalia
SO07	Hiiraan Region, Somalia
SO08	Jubbada Dhexe Region, Somalia
SO09	Jubbada Hoose Region, Somalia
SO10	Mudug Region, Somalia
SO12	Sanaag Region, Somalia
SO13	Shabeellaha Dhexe Region, Somalia
SO14	Shabeellaha Hoose Region, Somalia
SO18	Nugaal Region, Somalia
SO19	Togdheer Region, Somalia
SO20	Woqooyi Galbeed Region, Somalia
SO21	Awdal Region, Somalia
SO22	Sool Region, Somalia

== SP: Spain ==
FIPS Code	Region
SP07	Islas Baleares Comunidad Autónoma, Spain
SP27	La Rioja Autonomous Community, Spain
SP29	Madrid Autonomous Community, Spain
SP31	Murcia Autonomous Community, Spain
SP32	Navarra Autonomous Community, Spain
SP34	Asturias Autonomous Community, Spain
SP39	Cantabria Autonomous Community, Spain
SP51	Andalucía Autonomous Community, Spain
SP52	Aragón Autonomous Community, Spain
SP53	Canarias Autonomous Community, Spain
SP54	Castilla-La Mancha Autonomous Community, Spain
SP55	Castilla y León Autonomous Community, Spain
SP56	Cataluña Autonomous Community, Spain
SP57	Extremadura Autonomous Community, Spain
SP58	Galicia Autonomous Community, Spain
SP59	País Vasco Autonomous Community, Spain
SP60	Comunidad Valenciana Autonomous Community, Spain

== ST: Saint Lucia ==
FIPS Code	Region
ST01	Anse-la-Raye Quarter, Saint Lucia
ST02	Dauphin Quarter, Saint Lucia
ST03	Castries Quarter, Saint Lucia
ST04	Choiseul Quarter, Saint Lucia
ST05	Dennery Quarter, Saint Lucia
ST06	Gros-Islet Quarter, Saint Lucia
ST07	Laborie Quarter, Saint Lucia
ST08	Micoud Quarter, Saint Lucia
ST09	Soufrière Quarter, Saint Lucia
ST10	Vieux-Fort Quarter, Saint Lucia
ST11	Praslin Quarter, Saint Lucia

== SU: Sudan ==
FIPS Code	Region
SU29	Al Kharţūm State, Sudan
SU35	A`ālī an Nīl State, Sudan
SU36	Al Baḩr al Aḩmar State, Sudan
SU37	Al Buḩayrāt State, Sudan
SU38	Al Jazīrah State, Sudan
SU39	Al Qaḑārif State, Sudan
SU40	Al Waḩdah State, Sudan
SU41	An Nīl al Abyaḑ State, Sudan
SU42	An Nīl al Azraq State, Sudan
SU43	Ash Shamālīyah State, Sudan
SU44	Baḩr al Jabal State, Sudan
SU45	Gharb al Istiwā'īyah State, Sudan
SU46	Gharb Baḩr al Ghazāl State, Sudan
SU47	Gharb Dārfūr State, Sudan
SU48	Gharb Kurdufān State, Sudan
SU49	Janūb Dārfūr State, Sudan
SU50	Janūb Kurdufān State, Sudan
SU51	Junqalī State, Sudan
SU52	Kassalā State, Sudan
SU53	Nahr an Nīl State, Sudan
SU54	Shamāl Baḩr al Ghazāl State, Sudan
SU55	Shamāl Dārfūr State, Sudan
SU56	Shamāl Kurdufān State, Sudan
SU57	Sharq al Istiwā'īyah State, Sudan
SU58	Sinnār State, Sudan
SU59	Warab State, Sudan

== SW: Sweden ==
FIPS Code	Region
SW02	Blekinge County, Sweden
SW03	Gävleborg County, Sweden
SW05	Gotland County, Sweden
SW06	Halland County, Sweden
SW07	Jämtland County, Sweden
SW08	Jönköping County, Sweden
SW09	Kalmar County, Sweden
SW10	Dalarna County, Sweden
SW12	Kronoberg County, Sweden
SW14	Norrbotten County, Sweden
SW15	Örebro County, Sweden
SW16	Östergötland County, Sweden
SW18	Södermanland County, Sweden
SW21	Uppsala County, Sweden
SW22	Värmland County, Sweden
SW23	Västerbotten County, Sweden
SW24	Västernorrland County, Sweden
SW25	Västmanland County, Sweden
SW26	Stockholm County, Sweden
SW27	Skåne County, Sweden
SW28	Västra Götaland County, Sweden

== SY: Syria ==
FIPS Code	Region
SY01	Al Ḩasakah Province, Syria
SY02	Al Lādhiqīyah Province, Syria
SY03	Al Qunayţirah Province, Syria
SY04	Ar Raqqah Province, Syria
SY05	As Suwaydā' Province, Syria
SY06	Dar`ā Province, Syria
SY07	Deir ez-Zor Province, Syria
SY08	Rīf Dimashq Province, Syria
SY09	Ḩalab Province, Syria
SY10	Ḩamāh Province, Syria
SY11	Ḩimş Province, Syria
SY12	Idlib Province, Syria
SY13	Dimashq Province, Syria
SY14	Ţarţūs Province, Syria

== SZ: Switzerland ==
FIPS Code	Region
SZ01	Aargau, Switzerland
SZ02	Appenzell Ausserrhoden, Switzerland
SZ03	Basel-Landschaft, Switzerland
SZ04	Basel-Stadt, Switzerland
SZ05	Bern, Switzerland
SZ06	Fribourg, Switzerland
SZ07	Geneva, Switzerland
SZ08	Glarus, Switzerland
SZ09	Graubünden, Switzerland
SZ10	Appenzell Innerrhoden, Switzerland
SZ11	Lucerne, Switzerland
SZ12	Neuchâtel, Switzerland
SZ13	Nidwalden, Switzerland
SZ14	Obwalden, Switzerland
SZ15	St. Gallen, Switzerland
SZ16	Schaffhausen, Switzerland
SZ17	Schwyz, Switzerland
SZ18	Solothurn, Switzerland
SZ19	Thurgau, Switzerland
SZ20	Ticino, Switzerland
SZ21	Uri, Switzerland
SZ22	Valais, Switzerland
SZ23	Vaud, Switzerland
SZ24	Zug, Switzerland
SZ25	Zürich, Switzerland
SZ26	Jura, Switzerland

== TD: Trinidad and Tobago ==
FIPS Code	Region
TD01	Arima municipality, Trinidad and Tobago
TD02	Caroni County, Trinidad and Tobago
TD03	Mayaro County, Trinidad and Tobago
TD04	Nariva County, Trinidad and Tobago
TD05	Port of Spain municipality, Trinidad and Tobago
TD06	Saint Andrew County, Trinidad and Tobago
TD07	Saint David County, Trinidad and Tobago
TD08	Saint George County, Trinidad and Tobago
TD09	Saint Patrick County, Trinidad and Tobago
TD10	San Fernando, Trinidad and Tobago
TD11	Tobago ward, Trinidad and Tobago
TD12	Victoria County, Trinidad and Tobago
TD13	Chaguanas, Trinidad and Tobago
TD14	Couva–Tabaquite–Talparo, Trinidad and Tobago
TD15	Diego Martin, Trinidad and Tobago
TD16	Mayaro–Rio Claro, Trinidad and Tobago
TD17	Penal–Debe, Trinidad and Tobago
TD18	Point Fortin, Trinidad and Tobago
TD19	Princes Town, Trinidad and Tobago
TD20	San Juan–Laventille, Trinidad and Tobago
TD21	Sangre Grande, Trinidad and Tobago
TD22	Siparia, Trinidad and Tobago
TD23	Tunapuna–Piarco, Trinidad and Tobago

== TH: Thailand ==
FIPS Code	Region
TH01	Mae Hong Son Province, Thailand
TH02	Chiang Mai Province, Thailand
TH03	Chiang Rai Province, Thailand
TH04	Nan Province, Thailand
TH05	Lamphun Province, Thailand
TH06	Lampang Province, Thailand
TH07	Phrae Province, Thailand
TH08	Tak Province, Thailand
TH09	Sukhothai Province, Thailand
TH10	Uttaradit Province, Thailand
TH11	Kamphaeng Phet Province, Thailand
TH12	Phitsanulok Province, Thailand
TH13	Phichit Province, Thailand
TH14	Phetchabun Province, Thailand
TH15	Uthai Thani Province, Thailand
TH16	Nakhon Sawan Province, Thailand
TH17	Nong Khai Province, Thailand
TH18	Loei Province, Thailand
TH20	Sakon Nakhon Province, Thailand
TH22	Khon Kaen Province, Thailand
TH23	Kalasin Province, Thailand
TH24	Maha Sarakham Province, Thailand
TH25	Roi Et Province, Thailand
TH26	Chaiyaphum Province, Thailand
TH27	Nakhon Ratchasima Province, Thailand
TH28	Buriram Province, Thailand
TH29	Surin Province, Thailand
TH30	Sisaket Province, Thailand
TH31	Narathiwat Province, Thailand
TH32	Chai Nat Province, Thailand
TH33	Sing Buri Province, Thailand
TH34	Lop Buri Province, Thailand
TH35	Ang Thong Province, Thailand
TH36	Phra Nakhon Si Ayutthaya Province, Thailand
TH37	Sara Buri Province, Thailand
TH38	Nonthaburi Province, Thailand
TH39	Pathum Thani Province, Thailand
TH40	Krung Thep Mahanakhon Province, Thailand
TH41	Phayao Province, Thailand
TH42	Samut Prakan Province, Thailand
TH43	Nakhon Nayok Province, Thailand
TH44	Chachoengsao Province, Thailand
TH46	Chon Buri Province, Thailand
TH47	Rayong Province, Thailand
TH48	Chanthaburi Province, Thailand
TH49	Trat Province, Thailand
TH50	Kanchanaburi Province, Thailand
TH51	Suphan Buri Province, Thailand
TH52	Ratchaburi Province, Thailand
TH53	Nakhon Pathom Province, Thailand
TH54	Samut Songkhram Province, Thailand
TH55	Samut Sakhon Province, Thailand
TH56	Phetchaburi Province, Thailand
TH57	Prachuap Khiri Khan Province, Thailand
TH58	Chumphon Province, Thailand
TH59	Ranong Province, Thailand
TH60	Surat Thani Province, Thailand
TH61	Phangnga Province, Thailand
TH62	Phuket Province, Thailand
TH63	Krabi Province, Thailand
TH64	Nakhon Si Thammarat Province, Thailand
TH65	Trang Province, Thailand
TH66	Phatthalung Province, Thailand
TH67	Satun Province, Thailand
TH68	Songkhla Province, Thailand
TH69	Pattani Province, Thailand
TH70	Yala Province, Thailand
TH72	Yasothon Province, Thailand
TH73	Nakhon Phanom Province, Thailand
TH74	Prachin Buri Province, Thailand
TH75	Ubon Ratchathani Province, Thailand
TH76	Udon Thani Province, Thailand
TH77	Amnat Charoen Province, Thailand
TH78	Mukdahan Province, Thailand
TH79	Nong Bua Lamphu Province, Thailand
TH80	Sa Kaeo Province, Thailand

== TI: Tajikistan ==
FIPS Code	Region
TI01	Kŭhistoni Badakhshon Viloyati Mukhtor, Tajikistan
TI02	Khatlon Region, Tajikistan
TI03	Sughd Region, Tajikistan
TI04	Dushanbe, Tajikistan
TI05	Districts of Republican Subordination, Tajikistan

== TN: Tonga ==
FIPS Code	Region
TN01	Ha`apai Island Group, Tonga
TN02	Tongatapu Island Group, Tonga
TN03	Vava`u Island Group, Tonga

== TO: Togo ==
FIPS Code	Region
TO22	Centrale Region, Togo
TO23	Kara Region, Togo
TO24	Maritime Region, Togo
TO25	Plateaux Region, Togo
TO26	Savanes Region, Togo

== TP: São Tomé and Príncipe ==
FIPS Code	Region
TP01	Príncipe, São Tomé and Príncipe
TP02	São Tomé, São Tomé and Príncipe

== TS: Tunisia ==
FIPS Code	Region
TS02	Kasserine Governorate, Tunisia
TS03	Kairouan Governorate, Tunisia
TS06	Jendouba Governorate, Tunisia
TS10	Qafsah Governorate, Tunisia
TS14	El Kef Governorate, Tunisia
TS15	Mahdia Governorate, Tunisia
TS16	Monastir Governorate, Tunisia
TS17	Béja Governorate, Tunisia
TS18	Bizerte Governorate, Tunisia
TS19	Nabeul Governorate, Tunisia
TS22	Siliana Governorate, Tunisia
TS23	Sousse Governorate, Tunisia
TS27	Ben Arous Governorate, Tunisia
TS28	Médenine Governorate, Tunisia
TS29	Gabès Governorate, Tunisia
TS31	Kebili Governorate, Tunisia
TS32	Sfax Governorate, Tunisia
TS33	Sidi Bou Zid Governorate, Tunisia
TS34	Tataouine Governorate, Tunisia
TS35	Tozeur Governorate, Tunisia
TS36	Tunis Governorate, Tunisia
TS37	Zaghouan Governorate, Tunisia
TS38	Ariana Governorate, Tunisia
TS39	Manouba Governorate, Tunisia

== TU: Turkey ==
FIPS Code	Region
TU01	Adana Province, Turkey
TU02	Adıyaman Province, Turkey
TU03	Afyonkarahisar Province, Turkey
TU04	Ağrı Province, Turkey
TU05	Amasya Province, Turkey
TU06	Ankara Province, Turkey
TU07	Antalya Province, Turkey
TU08	Artvin Province, Turkey
TU09	Aydın Province, Turkey
TU10	Balıkesir Province, Turkey
TU11	Bilecik Province, Turkey
TU12	Bingöl Province, Turkey
TU13	Bitlis Province, Turkey
TU14	Bolu Province, Turkey
TU15	Burdur Province, Turkey
TU16	Bursa Province, Turkey
TU17	Çanakkale Province, Turkey
TU18	Çankırı Province, Turkey
TU19	Çorum Province, Turkey
TU20	Denizli Province, Turkey
TU21	Diyarbakır Province, Turkey
TU22	Edirne Province, Turkey
TU23	Elazığ Province, Turkey
TU24	Erzincan Province, Turkey
TU25	Erzurum Province, Turkey
TU26	Eskişehir Province, Turkey
TU27	Gaziantep Province, Turkey
TU28	Gümüşhane Province, Turkey
TU29	Giresun Province, Turkey
TU30	Hakkari Province, Turkey
TU31	Hatay Province, Turkey
TU32	Isparta Province, Turkey
TU33	İçel Province, Turkey
TU34	Istanbul Province, Turkey
TU35	İzmir Province, Turkey
TU36	Kars Province, Turkey
TU37	Kastamonu Province, Turkey
TU38	Kayseri Province, Turkey
TU39	Kırklareli Province, Turkey
TU40	Kırşehir Province, Turkey
TU41	Kocaeli Province, Turkey
TU42	Konya Province, Turkey
TU43	Kütahya Province, Turkey
TU44	Malatya Province, Turkey
TU45	Manisa Province, Turkey
TU46	Kahramanmaraş Province, Turkey
TU47	Mardin Province, Turkey
TU48	Muğla Province, Turkey
TU49	Muş Province, Turkey
TU50	Nevşehir Province, Turkey
TU51	Niğde Province, Turkey
TU52	Ordu Province, Turkey
TU53	Rize Province, Turkey
TU54	Sakarya Province, Turkey
TU55	Samsun Province, Turkey
TU56	Siirt Province, Turkey
TU57	Sinop Province, Turkey
TU58	Sivas Province, Turkey
TU59	Tekirdağ Province, Turkey
TU60	Tokat Province, Turkey
TU61	Trabzon Province, Turkey
TU62	Tunceli Province, Turkey
TU63	Şanlıurfa Province, Turkey
TU64	Uşak Province, Turkey
TU65	Van Province, Turkey
TU66	Yozgat Province, Turkey
TU67	Zonguldak Province, Turkey
TU68	Aksaray Province, Turkey
TU69	Bayburt Province, Turkey
TU70	Karaman Province, Turkey
TU71	Kırıkkale Province, Turkey
TU72	Batman Province, Turkey
TU73	Şırnak Province, Turkey
TU74	Bartın Province, Turkey
TU75	Ardahan Province, Turkey
TU76	Iğdır Province, Turkey
TU77	Yalova Province, Turkey
TU78	Karabük Province, Turkey
TU79	Kilis Province, Turkey
TU80	Osmaniye Province, Turkey
TU81	Düzce Province, Turkey

== TW: Taiwan ==
FIPS Code	Region
TW01	Fu-chien, Taiwan
TW02	Kao-hsiung, Taiwan
TW03	T'ai-pei, Taiwan
TW04	T'ai-wan, Taiwan

== TX: Turkmenistan ==
FIPS Code	Region
TX01	Ahal Province, Turkmenistan
TX02	Balkan Province, Turkmenistan
TX03	Daşoguz Province, Turkmenistan
TX04	Lebap Province, Turkmenistan
TX05	Mary Province, Turkmenistan

== TZ: Tanzania ==
FIPS Code	Region
TZ02	Pwani Region, Tanzania
TZ03	Dodoma Region, Tanzania
TZ04	Iringa Region, Tanzania
TZ05	Kigoma Region, Tanzania
TZ06	Kilimanjaro Region, Tanzania
TZ07	Lindi Region, Tanzania
TZ08	Mara Region, Tanzania
TZ09	Mbeya Region, Tanzania
TZ10	Morogoro Region, Tanzania
TZ11	Mtwara Region, Tanzania
TZ12	Mwanza RegionTanzania
TZ13	Pemba North Region, Tanzania
TZ14	Ruvuma Region, Tanzania
TZ15	Shinyanga Region, Tanzania
TZ16	Singida Region, Tanzania
TZ17	Tabora Region, Tanzania
TZ18	Tanga Region, Tanzania
TZ19	Kagera Region, Tanzania
TZ20	Pemba South Region, Tanzania
TZ21	Zanzibar Central/South Region, Tanzania
TZ22	Zanzibar North Region, Tanzania
TZ23	Dar es Salaam Region, Tanzania
TZ24	Rukwa Region, Tanzania
TZ25	Zanzibar Urban/West Region, Tanzania
TZ26	Arusha Region, Tanzania
TZ27	Manyara Region, Tanzania

== UG: Uganda ==
FIPS Code	Region
UG26	Apac District, Uganda
UG28	Bundibugyo District, Uganda
UG29	Bushenyi District, Uganda
UG30	Gulu District, Uganda
UG31	Hoima District, Uganda
UG33	Jinja District, Uganda
UG34	Kabale District, Uganda
UG36	Kalangala District, Uganda
UG37	Kampala District, Uganda
UG38	Kamuli District, Uganda
UG39	Kapchorwa District, Uganda
UG40	Kasese District, Uganda
UG41	Kibale District, Uganda
UG42	Kiboga District, Uganda
UG43	Kisoro District, Uganda
UG45	Kotido District, Uganda
UG46	Kumi District, Uganda
UG47	Lira District, Uganda
UG50	Masindi District, Uganda
UG52	Mbarara District, Uganda
UG56	Mubende District, Uganda
UG58	Nebbi District, Uganda
UG59	Ntungamo District, Uganda
UG60	Pallisa District, Uganda
UG61	Rakai District, Uganda
UG65	Adjumani District, Uganda
UG66	Bugiri District, Uganda
UG67	Busia District, Uganda
UG69	Katakwi District, Uganda
UG70	Luwero District, Uganda
UG71	Masaka District, Uganda
UG72	Moyo District, Uganda
UG73	Nakasongola District, Uganda
UG74	Sembabule District, Uganda
UG76	Tororo District, Uganda
UG77	Arua District, Uganda
UG78	Iganga District, Uganda
UG79	Kabarole District, Uganda
UG80	Kaberamaido District, Uganda
UG81	Kamwenge District, Uganda
UG82	Kanungu District, Uganda
UG83	Kayunga District, Uganda
UG84	Kitgum District, Uganda
UG85	Kyenjojo District, Uganda
UG86	Mayuge District, Uganda
UG87	Mbale District, Uganda
UG88	Moroto District, Uganda
UG89	Mpigi District, Uganda
UG90	Mukono District, Uganda
UG91	Nakapiripirit District, Uganda
UG92	Pader District, Uganda
UG93	Rukungiri District, Uganda
UG94	Sironko District, Uganda
UG95	Soroti District, Uganda
UG96	Wakiso District, Uganda
UG97	Yumbe District, Uganda

== UK: United Kingdom ==
FIPS Code	Region
UKA1	London Borough of Barking and Dagenham, United Kingdom
UKA2	London Borough of Barnet, United Kingdom
UKA3	Metropolitan Borough of Barnsley, United Kingdom
UKA4	Bath and North East Somerset UA, United Kingdom
UKA5	County of Bedfordshire, United Kingdom
UKA6	London Borough of Bexley, United Kingdom
UKA7	Metropolitan Borough of Birmingham, United Kingdom
UKA8	Blackburn with Darwen UA, United Kingdom
UKA9	Blackpool UA, United Kingdom
UKB1	Metropolitan Borough of Bolton, United Kingdom
UKB2	Bournemouth UA, United Kingdom
UKB3	Bracknell Forest UA, United Kingdom
UKB4	Metropolitan Borough of Bradford, United Kingdom
UKB5	London Borough of Brent, United Kingdom
UKB6	Brighton and Hove UA, United Kingdom
UKB7	Bristol, United Kingdom
UKB8	London Borough of Bromley, United Kingdom
UKB9	County of Buckinghamshire, United Kingdom
UKC1	Metropolitan Borough of Bury, United Kingdom
UKC2	Metropolitan Borough of Calderdale, United Kingdom
UKC3	County of Cambridgeshire, United Kingdom
UKC4	London Borough of Camden, United Kingdom
UKC5	County of Cheshire, United Kingdom
UKC6	County of Cornwall, United Kingdom
UKC7	Metropolitan Borough of Coventry, United Kingdom
UKC8	London Borough of Croydon, United Kingdom
UKC9	County of Cumbria, United Kingdom
UKD1	Darlington UA, United Kingdom
UKD2	Derby UA, United Kingdom
UKD3	County of Derbyshire, United Kingdom
UKD4	County of Devon, United Kingdom
UKD5	Metropolitan Borough of Doncaster, United Kingdom
UKD6	County of Dorset, United Kingdom
UKD7	Metropolitan Borough of Dudley, United Kingdom
UKD8	County of Durham, United Kingdom
UKD9	London Borough of Ealing, United Kingdom
UKE1	East Riding of Yorkshire UA, United Kingdom
UKE2	County of East Sussex, United Kingdom
UKE3	London Borough of Enfield, United Kingdom
UKE4	County of Essex, United Kingdom
UKE5	Metropolitan Borough of Gateshead, United Kingdom
UKE6	County of Gloucestershire, United Kingdom
UKE7	Royal Borough of Greenwich, United Kingdom
UKE8	London Borough of Hackney, United Kingdom
UKE9	Halton UA, United Kingdom
UKF1	London Borough of Hammersmith and Fulham, United Kingdom
UKF2	County of Hampshire, United Kingdom
UKF3	London Borough of Haringey, United Kingdom
UKF4	London Borough of Harrow, United Kingdom
UKF5	Hartlepool UA, United Kingdom
UKF6	London Borough of Havering, United Kingdom
UKF7	Herefordshire UA, United Kingdom
UKF8	County of Hertfordshire, United Kingdom
UKF9	London Borough of Hillingdon, United Kingdom
UKG1	London Borough of Hounslow, United Kingdom
UKG2	Isle of Wight UA, United Kingdom
UKG3	London Borough of Islington, United Kingdom
UKG4	London Borough of Kensington and Chelsea, United Kingdom
UKG5	County of Kent, United Kingdom
UKG6	Kingston upon Hull UA, United Kingdom
UKG7	London Borough of Kingston upon Thames, United Kingdom
UKG8	Metropolitan Borough of Kirklees, United Kingdom
UKG9	Metropolitan Borough of Knowsley, United Kingdom
UKH1	London Borough of Lambeth, United Kingdom
UKH2	County of Lancashire, United Kingdom
UKH3	Metropolitan Borough of Leeds, United Kingdom
UKH4	Leicester UA, United Kingdom
UKH5	County of Leicestershire, United Kingdom
UKH6	London Borough of Lewisham, United Kingdom
UKH7	County of Lincolnshire, United Kingdom
UKH8	Metropolitan Borough of Liverpool, United Kingdom
UKH9	City of London, United Kingdom
UKI1	Luton UA, United Kingdom
UKI2	Metropolitan Borough of Manchester, United Kingdom
UKI3	Medway UA, United Kingdom
UKI4	London Borough of Merton, United Kingdom
UKI5	Middlesbrough UA, United Kingdom
UKI6	Milton Keynes UA, United Kingdom
UKI7	Metropolitan Borough of Newcastle upon Tyne, United Kingdom
UKI8	London Borough of Newham, United Kingdom
UKI9	County of Norfolk, United Kingdom
UKJ1	County of Northamptonshire, United Kingdom
UKJ2	North East Lincolnshire UA, United Kingdom
UKJ3	North Lincolnshire UA, United Kingdom
UKJ4	North Somerset UA, United Kingdom
UKJ5	Metropolitan Borough of North Tyneside, United Kingdom
UKJ6	County of Northumberland, United Kingdom
UKJ7	County of North Yorkshire, United Kingdom
UKJ8	Nottingham UA, United Kingdom
UKJ9	County of Nottinghamshire, United Kingdom
UKK1	Metropolitan Borough of Oldham, United Kingdom
UKK2	County of Oxfordshire, United Kingdom
UKK3	Peterborough UA, United Kingdom
UKK4	Plymouth UA, United Kingdom
UKK5	Poole UA, United Kingdom
UKK6	Portsmouth UA, United Kingdom
UKK7	Reading UA, United Kingdom
UKK8	London Borough of Redbridge, United Kingdom
UKK9	Redcar and Cleveland UA, United Kingdom
UKL1	London Borough of Richmond upon Thames, United Kingdom
UKL2	Metropolitan Borough of Rochdale, United Kingdom
UKL3	Metropolitan Borough of Rotherham, United Kingdom
UKL4	Rutland UA, United Kingdom
UKL5	Metropolitan Borough of Salford, United Kingdom
UKL6	County of Shropshire, United Kingdom
UKL7	Metropolitan Borough of Sandwell, United Kingdom
UKL8	Metropolitan Borough of Sefton, United Kingdom
UKL9	Metropolitan Borough of Sheffield, United Kingdom
UKM1	Slough UA, United Kingdom
UKM2	Metropolitan Borough of Solihull, United Kingdom
UKM3	County of Somerset, United Kingdom
UKM4	Southampton UA, United Kingdom
UKM5	Southend-on-Sea UA, United Kingdom
UKM6	South Gloucestershire UA, United Kingdom
UKM7	Metropolitan Borough of South Tyneside, United Kingdom
UKM8	London Borough of Southwark, United Kingdom
UKM9	County of Staffordshire, United Kingdom
UKN1	Metropolitan Borough of St Helens, United Kingdom
UKN2	Metropolitan Borough of Stockport, United Kingdom
UKN3	Stockton-on-Tees UA, United Kingdom
UKN4	Stoke-on-Trent UA, United Kingdom
UKN5	County of Suffolk, United Kingdom
UKN6	Metropolitan Borough of Sunderland, United Kingdom
UKN7	County of Surrey, United Kingdom
UKN8	London Borough of Sutton, United Kingdom
UKN9	Swindon UA, United Kingdom
UKO1	Metropolitan Borough of Tameside, United Kingdom
UKO2	Telford and Wrekin UA, United Kingdom
UKO3	Thurrock UA, United Kingdom
UKO4	Torbay UA, United Kingdom
UKO5	London Borough of Tower Hamlets, United Kingdom
UKO6	Metropolitan Borough of Trafford, United Kingdom
UKO7	Metropolitan Borough of Wakefield, United Kingdom
UKO8	Metropolitan Borough of Walsall, United Kingdom
UKO9	London Borough of Waltham Forest, United Kingdom
UKP1	London Borough of Wandsworth, United Kingdom
UKP2	Warrington UA, United Kingdom
UKP3	County of Warwickshire, United Kingdom
UKP4	West Berkshire UA, United Kingdom
UKP5	London Borough of Westminster, United Kingdom
UKP6	County of West Sussex, United Kingdom
UKP7	Metropolitan Borough of Wigan, United Kingdom
UKP8	County of Wiltshire, United Kingdom
UKP9	Windsor and Maidenhead UA, United Kingdom
UKQ1	Metropolitan Borough of Wirral, United Kingdom
UKQ2	Wokingham UA, United Kingdom
UKQ3	Metropolitan Borough of Wolverhampton, United Kingdom
UKQ4	County of Worcestershire, United Kingdom
UKQ5	York UA, United Kingdom
UKQ6	Antrim District, United Kingdom
UKQ7	Ards District, United Kingdom
UKQ8	Armagh District, United Kingdom
UKQ9	Ballymena District, United Kingdom
UKR1	Ballymoney District, United Kingdom
UKR2	Banbridge District, United Kingdom
UKR3	Belfast District, United Kingdom
UKR4	Carrickfergus District, United Kingdom
UKR5	Castlereagh District, United Kingdom
UKR6	Coleraine District, United Kingdom
UKR7	Cookstown District, United Kingdom
UKR8	Craigavon District, United Kingdom
UKR9	Down District, United Kingdom
UKS1	Dungannon and South Tyrone District, United Kingdom
UKS2	Fermanagh District, United Kingdom
UKS3	Larne District, United Kingdom
UKS4	Limavady District, United Kingdom
UKS5	Lisburn District, United Kingdom
UKS6	Derry District, United Kingdom
UKS7	Magherafelt District, United Kingdom
UKS8	Moyle District, United Kingdom
UKS9	Newry and Mourne District, United Kingdom
UKT1	Newtownabbey District, United Kingdom
UKT2	North Down District, United Kingdom
UKT3	Omagh District, United Kingdom
UKT4	Strabane District, United Kingdom
UKT5	Aberdeen City Council Area, United Kingdom
UKT6	Aberdeenshire Council Area, United Kingdom
UKT7	Angus Council Area, United Kingdom
UKT8	Argyll and Bute Council Area, United Kingdom
UKT9	The Scottish Borders Council Area, United Kingdom
UKU1	Clackmannanshire Council Area, United Kingdom
UKU2	Dumfries and Galloway Council Area, United Kingdom
UKU3	Dundee City Council Area, United Kingdom
UKU4	East Ayrshire Council Area, United Kingdom
UKU5	East Dunbartonshire Council Area, United Kingdom
UKU6	East Lothian Council Area, United Kingdom
UKU7	East Renfrewshire Council Area, United Kingdom
UKU8	City of Edinburgh Council Area, United Kingdom
UKU9	Falkirk Council Area, United Kingdom
UKV1	Fife Council Area, United Kingdom
UKV2	Glasgow City Council Area, United Kingdom
UKV3	Highland Council Area, United Kingdom
UKV4	Inverclyde Council Area, United Kingdom
UKV5	Midlothian Council Area, United Kingdom
UKV6	Moray Council Area, United Kingdom
UKV7	North Ayrshire Council Area, United Kingdom
UKV8	North Lanarkshire Council Area, United Kingdom
UKV9	Orkney Islands Council Area, United Kingdom
UKW1	Perth and Kinross Council Area, United Kingdom
UKW2	Renfrewshire Council Area, United Kingdom
UKW3	Shetland Islands Council Area, United Kingdom
UKW4	South Ayrshire Council Area, United Kingdom
UKW5	South Lanarkshire Council Area, United Kingdom
UKW6	Stirling Council Area, United Kingdom
UKW7	West Dunbartonshire Council Area, United Kingdom
UKW8	Eilean Siar Council Area, United Kingdom
UKW9	West Lothian Council Area, United Kingdom
UKX1	Isle of Anglesey County, United Kingdom
UKX2	Blaenau Gwent County Borough, United Kingdom
UKX3	Bridgend County Borough, United Kingdom
UKX4	Caerphilly County Borough, United Kingdom
UKX5	Cardiff City and County, United Kingdom
UKX6	Ceredigion County, United Kingdom
UKX7	Carmarthenshire County, United Kingdom
UKX8	Conwy County Borough, United Kingdom
UKX9	Denbighshire County, United Kingdom
UKY1	Flintshire County, United Kingdom
UKY2	Gwynedd, United Kingdom
UKY3	Merthyr Tydfil County Borough, United Kingdom
UKY4	Monmouthshire County, United Kingdom
UKY5	Neath Port Talbot County Borough, United Kingdom
UKY6	Newport City, United Kingdom
UKY7	Pembrokeshire County, United Kingdom
UKY8	Powys County, United Kingdom
UKY9	Rhondda Cynon Taff County Borough, United Kingdom
UKZ1	Swansea City and County, United Kingdom
UKZ2	Torfaen County Borough, United Kingdom
UKZ3	Vale of Glamorgan, United Kingdom
UKZ4	Wrexham County Borough, United Kingdom

== UP: Ukraine ==
FIPS Code	Region
UP01	Cherkasy Oblast, Ukraine
UP02	Chernihiv Oblast, Ukraine
UP03	Chernivtsi Oblast, Ukraine
UP04	Dnipropetrovsk Oblast, Ukraine
UP05	Donetsk Oblast, Ukraine
UP06	Ivano-Frankivsk Oblast, Ukraine
UP07	Kharkiv Oblast, Ukraine
UP08	Kherson Oblast, Ukraine
UP09	Khmelnytskyi Oblast, Ukraine
UP10	Kirovohrad Oblast, Ukraine
UP11	Autonomous Republic of Crimea, Ukraine
UP12	Kyiv City, Ukraine
UP13	Kyiv Oblast, Ukraine
UP14	Luhansk Oblast, Ukraine
UP15	Lviv Oblast, Ukraine
UP16	Mykolaiv Oblast, Ukraine
UP17	Odesa Oblast, Ukraine
UP18	Poltava Oblast, Ukraine
UP19	Rivne Oblast, Ukraine
UP20	Sevastopol Municipality, Ukraine
UP21	Sumy Oblast, Ukraine
UP22	Ternopil Oblast, Ukraine
UP23	Vinnytsia Oblast, Ukraine
UP24	Volyn Oblast, Ukraine
UP25	Zakarpattia Oblast, Ukraine
UP26	Zaporizhzhia Oblast, Ukraine
UP27	Zhytomyr Oblast, Ukraine

== US: United States ==
FIPS Code	Region
US01	Alabama, United States
US02	Alaska, United States
US04	Arizona, United States
US05	Arkansas, United States
US06	California, United States
US08	Colorado, United States
US09	Connecticut, United States
US10	Delaware, United States
US11	District of Columbia, United States
US12	Florida, United States
US13	Georgia, United States
US15	Hawaii, United States
US16	Idaho, United States
US17	Illinois, United States
US18	Indiana, United States
US19	Iowa, United States
US20	Kansas, United States
US21	Kentucky, United States
US22	Louisiana, United States
US23	Maine, United States
US24	Maryland, United States
US25	Massachusetts, United States
US26	Michigan, United States
US27	Minnesota, United States
US28	Mississippi, United States
US29	Missouri, United States
US30	Montana, United States
US31	Nebraska, United States
US32	Nevada, United States
US33	New Hampshire, United States
US34	New Jersey, United States
US35	New Mexico, United States
US36	New York, United States
US37	North Carolina, United States
US38	North Dakota, United States
US39	Ohio, United States
US40	Oklahoma, United States
US41	Oregon, United States
US42	Pennsylvania, United States
US44	Rhode Island, United States
US45	South Carolina, United States
US46	South Dakota, United States
US47	Tennessee, United States
US48	Texas, United States
US49	Utah, United States
US50	Vermont, United States
US51	Virginia, United States
US53	Washington, United States
US54	West Virginia, United States
US55	Wisconsin, United States
US56	Wyoming, United States

== UV: Burkina Faso ==
FIPS Code	Region
UV15	Bam Province, Burkina Faso
UV19	Boulkiemdé Province, Burkina Faso
UV20	Ganzourgou Province, Burkina Faso
UV21	Gnagna Province, Burkina Faso
UV28	Kouritenga Province, Burkina Faso
UV33	Oudalan Province, Burkina Faso
UV34	Passoré Province, Burkina Faso
UV36	Sanguié Province, Burkina Faso
UV40	Soum Province, Burkina Faso
UV42	Tapoa Province, Burkina Faso
UV44	Zoundwéogo Province, Burkina Faso
UV45	Balé Province, Burkina Faso
UV46	Banwa Province, Burkina Faso
UV47	Bazèga Province, Burkina Faso
UV48	Bougouriba Province, Burkina Faso
UV49	Boulgou Province, Burkina Faso
UV50	Gourma Province, Burkina Faso
UV51	Houet Province, Burkina Faso
UV52	Ioba Province, Burkina Faso
UV53	Kadiogo Province, Burkina Faso
UV54	Kénédougou Province, Burkina Faso
UV55	Comoé Province, Burkina Faso
UV56	Komondjari Province, Burkina Faso
UV57	Kompienga Province, Burkina Faso
UV58	Kossi Province, Burkina Faso
UV59	Koulpélogo Province, Burkina Faso
UV60	Kourwéogo Province, Burkina Faso
UV61	Léraba Province, Burkina Faso
UV62	Loroum Province, Burkina Faso
UV63	Mouhoun Province, Burkina Faso
UV64	Namentenga Province, Burkina Faso
UV65	Nahouri Province, Burkina Faso
UV66	Nayala Province, Burkina Faso
UV67	Noumbiel Province, Burkina Faso
UV68	Oubritenga Province, Burkina Faso
UV69	Poni Province, Burkina Faso
UV70	Sanmatenga Province, Burkina Faso
UV71	Séno Province, Burkina Faso
UV72	Sissili Province, Burkina Faso
UV73	Sourou Province, Burkina Faso
UV74	Tuy Province, Burkina Faso
UV75	Yagha Province, Burkina Faso
UV76	Yatenga Province, Burkina Faso
UV77	Ziro Province, Burkina Faso
UV78	Zondoma Province, Burkina Faso

== UY: Uruguay ==
FIPS Code	Region
UY01	Artigas Department, Uruguay
UY02	Canelones Department, Uruguay
UY03	Cerro Largo Department, Uruguay
UY04	Colonia Department, Uruguay
UY05	Durazno Department, Uruguay
UY06	Flores Department, Uruguay
UY07	Florida Department, Uruguay
UY08	Lavalleja Department, Uruguay
UY09	Maldonado Department, Uruguay
UY10	Montevideo Department, Uruguay
UY11	Paysandú Department, Uruguay
UY12	Río Negro Department, Uruguay
UY13	Rivera Department, Uruguay
UY14	Rocha Department, Uruguay
UY15	Salto Department, Uruguay
UY16	San José Department, Uruguay
UY17	Soriano Department, Uruguay
UY18	Tacuarembó Department, Uruguay
UY19	Treinta y Tres Department, Uruguay

== UZ: Uzbekistan ==
FIPS Code	Region
UZ01	Andijon Region, Uzbekistan
UZ02	Buxoro Region, Uzbekistan
UZ03	Fargʻona Region, Uzbekistan
UZ05	Xorazm Region, Uzbekistan
UZ06	Namangan Region, Uzbekistan
UZ07	Navoiy Region, Uzbekistan
UZ08	Qashqadaryo Region, Uzbekistan
UZ09	Qoraqalpogʻiston Respublikasi, Uzbekistan
UZ10	Samarqand Region, Uzbekistan
UZ12	Surxondaryo Region, Uzbekistan
UZ13	Toshkent City, Uzbekistan
UZ14	Toshkent Region, Uzbekistan
UZ15	Jizzax Region, Uzbekistan
UZ16	Sirdaryo Region, Uzbekistan

== See also ==
- List of FIPS region codes (A–C)
- List of FIPS region codes (D–F)
- List of FIPS region codes (G–I)
- List of FIPS region codes (J–L)
- List of FIPS region codes (M–O)
- List of FIPS region codes (P–R)
- List of FIPS region codes (V–Z)

== Sources ==
- FIPS 10-4 Codes and history
  - Last version of codes
  - All codes (include earlier versions)
  - Table to see the evolution of the codes over time
- Administrative Divisions of Countries ("Statoids"), Statoids.com
