= List of FIPS region codes (J–L) =

This is a list of FIPS 10-4 region codes from J-L, using a standardized name format, and cross-linking to articles.

On September 2, 2008, FIPS 10-4 was one of ten standards withdrawn by NIST as a Federal Information Processing Standard. The list here is the last version of codes. For earlier versions, see link below.

== JA: Japan ==
FIPS Code	Region
JA01	Aichi Prefecture, Japan
JA02	Akita Prefecture, Japan
JA03	Aomori Prefecture, Japan
JA04	Chiba Prefecture, Japan
JA05	Ehime Prefecture, Japan
JA06	Fukui Prefecture, Japan
JA07	Fukuoka Prefecture, Japan
JA08	Fukushima Prefecture, Japan
JA09	Gifu Prefecture, Japan
JA10	Gunma Prefecture, Japan
JA11	Hiroshima Prefecture, Japan
JA12	Hokkaidō Prefecture, Japan
JA13	Hyōgo Prefecture, Japan
JA14	Ibaraki Prefecture, Japan
JA15	Ishikawa Prefecture, Japan
JA16	Iwate Prefecture, Japan
JA17	Kagawa Prefecture, Japan
JA18	Kagoshima Prefecture, Japan
JA19	Kanagawa Prefecture, Japan
JA20	Kōchi Prefecture, Japan
JA21	Kumamoto Prefecture, Japan
JA22	Kyōto Prefecture, Japan
JA23	Mie Prefecture, Japan
JA24	Miyagi Prefecture, Japan
JA25	Miyazaki Prefecture, Japan
JA26	Nagano Prefecture, Japan
JA27	Nagasaki Prefecture, Japan
JA28	Nara Prefecture, Japan
JA29	Niigata Prefecture, Japan
JA30	Ōita Prefecture, Japan
JA31	Okayama Prefecture, Japan
JA32	Ōsaka Prefecture, Japan
JA33	Saga Prefecture, Japan
JA34	Saitama Prefecture, Japan
JA35	Shiga Prefecture, Japan
JA36	Shimane Prefecture, Japan
JA37	Shizuoka Prefecture, Japan
JA38	Tochigi Prefecture, Japan
JA39	Tokushima Prefecture, Japan
JA40	Tōkyō Prefecture, Japan
JA41	Tottori Prefecture, Japan
JA42	Toyama Prefecture, Japan
JA43	Wakayama Prefecture, Japan
JA44	Yamagata Prefecture, Japan
JA45	Yamaguchi Prefecture, Japan
JA46	Yamanashi Prefecture, Japan
JA47	Okinawa Prefecture, Japan

== JM: Jamaica ==
FIPS Code	Region
JM01	Clarendon Parish, Jamaica
JM02	Hanover Parish, Jamaica
JM04	Manchester Parish, Jamaica
JM07	Portland Parish, Jamaica
JM08	Saint Andrew Parish, Jamaica
JM09	Saint Ann Parish, Jamaica
JM10	Saint Catherine Parish, Jamaica
JM11	Saint Elizabeth Parish, Jamaica
JM12	Saint James Parish, Jamaica
JM13	Saint Mary Parish, Jamaica
JM14	Saint Thomas Parish, Jamaica
JM15	Trelawny Parish, Jamaica
JM16	Westmoreland Parish, Jamaica
JM17	Kingston Parish, Jamaica

== JO: Jordan ==
FIPS Code	Region
JO02	Balqa Governorate, Jordan
JO09	Karak Governorate, Jordan
JO12	Tafilah Governorate, Jordan
JO15	Mafraq Governorate, Jordan
JO16	Amman Governorate, Jordan
JO17	Zarqa Governorate, Jordan
JO18	Irbid Governorate, Jordan
JO19	Ma'an Governorate, Jordan
JO20	Ajlun Governorate, Jordan
JO21	Aqaba Governorate, Jordan
JO22	Jerash Governorate, Jordan
JO23	Madaba Governorate, Jordan

== KE: Kenya ==
FIPS Code	Region
KE01	Central Province, Kenya
KE02	Coast Province, Kenya
KE03	Eastern Province, Kenya
KE05	Nairobi Area, Kenya
KE06	North Eastern Province, Kenya
KE07	Nyanza Province, Kenya
KE08	Rift Valley Province, Kenya
KE09	Western Province, Kenya

== KG: Kyrgyzstan ==
FIPS Code	Region
KG01	Bishkek City, Kyrgyzstan
KG02	Chüy Region, Kyrgyzstan
KG03	Jalal-Abad Region, Kyrgyzstan
KG04	Naryn Region, Kyrgyzstan
KG06	Talas Region, Kyrgyzstan
KG07	Ysyk-Köl Region, Kyrgyzstan
KG08	Osh Region, Kyrgyzstan
KG09	Batken Region, Kyrgyzstan

== KN: North Korea ==
FIPS Code	Region
KN01	Chagang Province, North Korea
KN03	Hamgyong-namdo Province, North Korea
KN06	Hwanghae-namdo Province, North Korea
KN07	Hwanghae-bukto, North Korea
KN08	Kaesŏng-si Municipality, North Korea
KN09	Kangwŏn-do Province, North Korea
KN11	P'yongan-bukto Province, North Korea
KN12	P'yŏngyang-si Municipality, North Korea
KN13	Yanggang-do Province, North Korea
KN14	Namp'o-si Municipality, North Korea
KN15	P'yongan-namdo Province, North Korea
KN17	Hamgyong-bukto Province, North Korea
KN18	Najin Sonbong-si Municipality, North Korea

== KR: Kiribati ==
FIPS Code	Region
KR01	Gilbert Islands, Kiribati
KR02	Line Islands, Kiribati
KR03	Phoenix Islands, Kiribati

== KS: South Korea ==
FIPS Code	Region
KS01	Cheju Province, South Korea
KS03	Chŏlla-bukto Province, South Korea
KS05	Ch'ungch'ŏng buk-do Province, South Korea
KS06	Kangwŏn-do Province, South Korea
KS10	Pusan Metropolitan City, South Korea
KS11	Sŏul Special City, South Korea
KS12	Inch'ŏn Metropolitan City, South Korea
KS13	Kyŏnggi-do Province, South Korea
KS14	Kyŏngsang-bukto, South Korea
KS15:	Taegu Metropolitan City, South Korea
KS16	Chŏlla-namdo, South Korea
KS17	Ch'ungch'ŏng-namdo Province, South Korea
KS18	Kwangju Metropolitan City, South Korea
KS19	Taejŏn Metropolitan City, South Korea
KS20	Kyŏngsang-namdo, South Korea
KS21	Ulsan Metropolitan City, South Korea

== KU: Kuwait ==
FIPS Code	Region
KU02	Al Asimah Governorate, Kuwait
KU04	Al Ahmadi Governorate, Kuwait
KU05	Al Jahra Governorate, Kuwait
KU07	Al Farwaniyah Governorate, Kuwait
KU08	Hawalli Governorate, Kuwait
KU09	Mubarak al Kabir Governorate, Kuwait

== KZ: Kazakhstan ==
FIPS Code	Region
KZ01	Almaty Province, Kazakhstan
KZ02	Almaty City, Kazakhstan
KZ03	Akmola Province, Kazakhstan
KZ04	Aktobe Province, Kazakhstan
KZ05	Nur-Sultan City, Kazakhstan
KZ06	Atyrau Province, Kazakhstan
KZ07	Batys Qazaqstan Province, Kazakhstan
KZ08	Baykonyr City, Kazakhstan
KZ09	Mangystau Province, Kazakhstan
KZ10	Ongtüstik Qazaqstan Province, Kazakhstan
KZ11	Pavlodar Province, Kazakhstan
KZ12	Karagandy Province, Kazakhstan
KZ13	Kostanay Province, Kazakhstan
KZ14	Kyzylorda Province, Kazakhstan
KZ15	Shyghys Qazaqstan Province, Kazakhstan
KZ16	Soltustik Qazaqstan Province, Kazakhstan
KZ17	Jambyl Province, Kazakhstan

== LA: Laos ==
FIPS Code	Region
LA01	Attapu Province, Laos
LA02	Champasak Province, Laos
LA03	Houaphan Province, Laos
LA07	Oudômxai Province, Laos
LA13	Xaignabouli Province, Laos
LA14	Xiangkhoang Province, Laos
LA15	Khammouan Province, Laos
LA16	Louang Namtha Province, Laos
LA17	Louangphrabang Province, Laos
LA18	Phôngsali Province, Laos
LA19	Salavan Province, Laos
LA20	Savannakhét Province, Laos
LA22	Bokèo Province, Laos
LA23	Bolikhamxai Province, Laos
LA24	Viangchan Municipality, Laos
LA25	Xaisômboun Special Zone, Laos
LA26	Xékong Province, Laos
LA27	Vientiane Province, Laos

== LE: Lebanon ==
FIPS Code	Region
LE04	Beirut Governorate, Lebanon
LE05	Mount Lebanon Governorate, Lebanon
LE06	South Governorate, Lebanon
LE07	Nabatieh Governorate, Lebanon
LE08	Beqaa Governorate, Lebanon
LE09	North Governorate, Lebanon
LE10	Aakkâr Governorate, Lebanon
LE11	Baalbek-Hermel Governorate, Lebanon

== LG: Latvia ==
FIPS Code	Region
LG01	Aizkraukle district, Latvia
LG02	Alūksne district, Latvia
LG03	Balvi district, Latvia
LG04	Bauskas district, Latvia
LG05	Cēsis district, Latvia
LG06	Daugavpils Municipality, Latvia
LG07	Daugavpils district, Latvia
LG08	Dobele district, Latvia
LG09	Gulbene district, Latvia
LG10	Jēkabpils district, Latvia
LG11	Jelgava Municipality, Latvia
LG12	Jelgava district, Latvia
LG13	Jūrmala Municipality, Latvia
LG14	Krāslava district, Latvia
LG15	Kuldīga district, Latvia
LG16	Liepāja Municipality, Latvia
LG17	Liepāja district, Latvia
LG18	Limbaži district, Latvia
LG19	Ludza district, Latvia
LG20	Madona district, Latvia
LG21	Ogre district, Latvia
LG22	Preiļi district, Latvia
LG23	Rēzekne Municipality, Latvia
LG24	Rēzekne district, Latvia
LG25	Riga Municipality, Latvia
LG26	Riga district, Latvia
LG27	Saldus district, Latvia
LG28	Talsi district, Latvia
LG29	Tukums district, Latvia
LG30	Valka district, Latvia
LG31	Valmiera district, Latvia
LG32	Ventspils Municipality, Latvia
LG33	Ventspils district, Latvia

== LH: Lithuania ==
FIPS Code	Region
LH56	Alytus County, Lithuania
LH57	Kaunas County, Lithuania
LH58	Klaipėda County, Lithuania
LH59	Marijampolė County, Lithuania
LH60	Panevėžys County, Lithuania
LH61	Šiauliai County, Lithuania
LH62	Tauragė County, Lithuania
LH63	Telšiai County, Lithuania
LH64	Utena County, Lithuania
LH65	Vilnius County, Lithuania

== LI: Liberia ==
FIPS Code	Region
LI01	Bong County, Liberia
LI09	Nimba County, Liberia
LI10	Sinoe County, Liberia
LI11	Grand Bassa County, Liberia
LI12	Grand Cape Mount County, Liberia
LI13	Maryland County, Liberia
LI14	Montserrado County, Liberia
LI15	Bomi County, Liberia
LI16	Grand Kru County, Liberia
LI17	Margibi County, Liberia
LI18	Rivercess County, Liberia
LI19	Grand Gedeh County, Liberia
LI20	Lofa County, Liberia
LI21	Gbarpolu County, Liberia
LI22	River Gee County, Liberia

== LO: Slovakia ==
FIPS Code	Region
LO01	Banská Bystrica Region, Slovakia
LO02	Bratislava Region, Slovakia
LO03	Košice Region, Slovakia
LO04	Nitra Region, Slovakia
LO05	Prešov Region, Slovakia
LO06	Trenčín Region, Slovakia
LO07	Trnava Region, Slovakia
LO08	Žilina Region, Slovakia

== LS: Liechtenstein ==
FIPS Code	Region
LS01	Balzers Commune, Liechtenstein
LS02	Eschen Commune, Liechtenstein
LS03	Gamprin Commune, Liechtenstein
LS04	Mauren Commune, Liechtenstein
LS05	Planken Commune, Liechtenstein
LS06	Ruggell Commune, Liechtenstein
LS07	Schaan Commune, Liechtenstein
LS08	Schellenberg Commune, Liechtenstein
LS09	Triesen Commune, Liechtenstein
LS10	Triesenberg Commune, Liechtenstein
LS11	Vaduz Commune, Liechtenstein

== LT: Lesotho ==
FIPS Code	Region
LT10	Berea District, Lesotho
LT11	Butha-Buthe District, Lesotho
LT12	Leribe District, Lesotho
LT13	Mafeteng District, Lesotho
LT14	Maseru District, Lesotho
LT15	Mohale's Hoek District, Lesotho
LT16	Mokhotlong District, Lesotho
LT17	Qacha's Nek District, Lesotho
LT18	Quthing District, Lesotho
LT19	Thaba-Tseka District, Lesotho

== LU: Luxembourg ==
FIPS Code	Region
LU01	Diekirch district, Luxembourg
LU02	Grevenmacher district, Luxembourg
LU03	Luxembourg district, Luxembourg

== LY: Libya ==
This list of codes for Libya is based upon the 1988–1995 baladiyat subdivision of Libya. The first level subdivisions of Libya have changed several times since then. See Districts of Libya.

FIPS Code	Region
LY03	Al `Azīzīyah district, Libya
LY05	Al Jufrah district, Libya
LY08	Al Kufrah district, Libya
LY13	Ash Shāţi' district, Libya
LY30	Murzuq district, Libya
LY34	Sabhā district, Libya
LY41	Tarhūnah district, Libya
LY42	Ţubruq district, Libya
LY45	Zlīţan district, Libya
LY47	Ajdābiyā district, Libya
LY48	Al Fātiḩ district, Libya
LY49	Al Jabal al Akhḑar district, Libya
LY50	Al Khums district, Libya
LY51	An Nuqāţ al Khams, Libya
LY52	Awbār district, Libya
LY53	Az Zāwiyah district, Libya
LY54	Benghazi district, Libya
LY55	Darnah district, Libya
LY56	Ghadāmis district, Libya
LY57	Gharyān district, Libya
LY58	Mişrātah district, Libya
LY59	Sawfajjīn district, Libya
LY60	Sirte district, Libya
LY61	Ţarābulus district, Libya
LY62	Yafran district, Libya

== See also ==
- List of FIPS region codes (A-C)
- List of FIPS region codes (D-F)
- List of FIPS region codes (G-I)
- List of FIPS region codes (M-O)
- List of FIPS region codes (P-R)
- List of FIPS region codes (S-U)
- List of FIPS region codes (V-Z)

== Sources ==
- FIPS 10-4 Codes and history
  - Last version of codes
  - All codes (include earlier versions)
  - Table to see the evolution of the codes over time
- Administrative Divisions of Countries ("Statoids"), Statoids.com
