= ISO 3166-2:BW =

Entry for Botswana in ISO 3166-2

ISO 3166-2:BW is the entry for Botswana in ISO 3166-2, part of the ISO 3166 standard published by the International Organization for Standardization (ISO), which defines codes for the names of the principal subdivisions (e.g., provinces or states) of all countries coded in ISO 3166-1.

Currently for Botswana, ISO 3166-2 codes are defined for ten districts, four towns and two cities.

Each code consists of two parts, separated by a hyphen. The first part is BW, the ISO 3166-1 alpha-2 code of Botswana. The second part is two letters.

== Current codes ==
Subdivision names are listed as in the ISO 3166-2 standard published by the ISO 3166 Maintenance Agency (ISO 3166/MA).

Click on the button in the header to sort each column.

Code	Subdivision name (en)	Subdivision category
BW-CE	Central	district
BW-CH	Chobe	district
BW-FR	Francistown	city
BW-GA	Gaborone	city
BW-GH	Ghanzi	district
BW-JW	Jwaneng	town
BW-KG	Kgalagadi	district
BW-KL	Kgatleng	district
BW-KW	Kweneng	district
BW-LO	Lobatse	town
BW-NE	North East	district
BW-NW	North West	district
BW-SP	Selibe Phikwe	town
BW-SE	South East	district
BW-SO	Southern	district
BW-ST	Sowa Town	town

== Changes ==
The following changes to the entry have been announced in newsletters by the ISO 3166/MA since the first publication of ISO 3166-2 in 1998:

Newsletter	Date issued	Description of change in newsletter	Code/Subdivision change
Newsletter I-5	2003-09-05	Deletion of Chobe district which is incorporated into (new) BW-NW. Change of code element of North-West District to BW-NW. Deletion of alternative names. Update of list source	Subdivisions deleted: BW-CH Chobe; Codes: BW-NG Ngamiland → BW-NW North-West
Online Browsing; Platform (OBP)	2014-10-29	Add 1 district BW-CH, 2 cities BW-FR and BW-GA, 4 towns BW-JW, BW-LO, BW-SP, BW-ST; remove hyphens from BW-NE, BW-NW, and BW-SE; update List Source	Subdivisions added: BW-CH Chobe; BW-FR Francistown; BW-GA Gaborone; BW-JW Jwaneng; BW-LO Lobatse; BW-SP Selibe Phikwe; BW-ST Sowa Town; Spelling changes: BW-NE North-East → North East; BW-NW North-West → North West; BW-SE South-East → South East

== See also ==
- Subdivisions of Botswana
- FIPS region codes of Botswana
- Neighbouring countries: NA, ZA, ZM, ZW
