= List of FIPS region codes (G–I) =

This is a list of FIPS 10-4 region codes from G-I, using a standardized name format, and cross-linking to articles.

On September 2, 2008, FIPS 10-4 was one of ten standards withdrawn by NIST as a Federal Information Processing Standard. The list here is the last version of codes. For earlier versions, see link below.

== GA: The Gambia ==
FIPS Code	Region
GA01	Banjul City
GA02	Lower River Division
GA03	Central River Division
GA04	Upper River Division
GA05	Western Division
GA07	North Bank Division

== GB: Gabon ==
FIPS Code	Region
GB01	Estuaire Province
GB02	Haut-Ogooué Province
GB03	Moyen-Ogooué Province
GB04	Ngounié Province
GB05	Nyanga Province
GB06	Ogooué-Ivindo Province
GB07	Ogooué-Lolo Province
GB08	Ogooué-Maritime Province
GB09	Woleu-Ntem Province

== GG: Georgia ==
FIPS Code	Region
GG01	Abashis Raioni
GG02	Abkhazia
GG03	Adigenis Raioni
GG04	Ajaria
GG05	Akhalgoris Raioni
GG06	Akhalk'alak'is Raioni
GG07	Akhalts'ikhis Raioni
GG08	Akhmetis Raioni
GG09	Ambrolauris Raioni
GG10	Aspindzis Raioni
GG11	Baghdat'is Raioni
GG12	Bolnisis Raioni
GG13	Borjomis Raioni
GG14	Chiat'ura
GG15	Ch'khorotsqus Raioni
GG16	Ch'okhatauris Raioni
GG17	Dedop'listsqaros Raioni
GG18	Dmanisis Raioni
GG19	Dushet'is Raioni
GG20	Gardabanis Raioni
GG21	Gori
GG22	Goris Raioni
GG23	Gurjaanis Raioni
GG24	Javis Raioni
GG25	K'arelis Raioni
GG26	Kaspis Raioni
GG27	Kharagaulis Raioni
GG28	Khashuris Raioni
GG29	Khobis Raioni
GG30	Khonis Raioni
GG31	K'ut'aisi
GG32	Lagodekhis Raioni
GG33	Lanch'khut'is Raioni
GG34	Lentekhis Raioni
GG35	Marneulis Raioni
GG36	Martvilis Raioni
GG37	Mestiis Raioni
GG38	Mts'khet'is Raioni
GG39	Ninotsmindis Raioni
GG40	Onis Raioni
GG41	Ozurget'is Raioni
GG42	P'ot'i
GG43	Qazbegis Raioni
GG44	Qvarlis Raioni
GG45	Rust'avi
GG46	Sach'kheris Raioni
GG47	Sagarejos Raioni
GG48	Samtrediis Raioni
GG49	Senakis Raioni
GG50	Sighnaghis Raioni
GG51	T'bilisi
GG52	T'elavis Raioni
GG53	T'erjolis Raioni
GG54	T'et'ritsqaros Raioni
GG55	T'ianet'is Raioni
GG56	Tqibuli
GG57	Ts'ageris Raioni
GG58	Tsalenjikhis Raioni
GG59	Tsalkis Raioni
GG60	Tsqaltubo
GG61	Vanis Raioni
GG62	Zestap'onis Raioni
GG63	Zugdidi
GG64	Zugdidis Raioni

== GH: Ghana ==
FIPS Code	Region
GH01	Greater Accra Region
GH02	Ashanti Region
GH03	Brong-Ahafo Region
GH04	Central Region
GH05	Eastern Region
GH06	Northern Region
GH08	Volta Region
GH09	Western Region
GH10	Upper East Region
GH11	Upper West Region

== GJ: Grenada ==
FIPS Code	Region
GJ01	Saint Andrew Parish
GJ02	Saint David Parish
GJ03	Saint George Parish
GJ04	Saint John Parish
GJ05	Saint Mark Parish
GJ06	Saint Patrick Parish

== GL: Greenland ==
Lansdele (pre 2009)

FIPS Code	Region
GL01	Nordgronland
GL02	Ostgronland
GL03	Vestgronland

Since 1953, and probably earlier, Greenland was divided into three lansdele ("country-parts"), sometimes called amter (counties), as shown above. In 2009 the lansdele were abolished and replaced by four kommuner. Kommuner (post 2009)

FIPS Code	Region
GL04	Kujalleq
GL05	Qaasuitsup
GL06	Qeqqata
GL07	Sermersooq

== GM: Germany ==
FIPS Code	Region
GM01	Baden-Württemberg State
GM02	Free State of Bavaria
GM03	Free Hanseatic City of Bremen
GM04	Free Hanseatic City of Hamburg
GM05	Hesse State
GM06	Lower Saxony State
GM07	North Rhine-Westphalia State
GM08	Rhineland-Palatinate State
GM09	Saarland State
GM10	Schleswig-Holstein State
GM11	Brandenburg State
GM12	Mecklenburg-Western Pomerania State
GM13	Free State of Saxony
GM14	Sachsen-Anhalt State
GM15	Free State of Thüringia
GM16	Berlin State

== GR: Greece ==
FIPS Code	Region
GR01	Évros Prefecture
GR02	Rodópi Prefecture
GR03	Xánthi Prefecture
GR04	Dráma Prefecture
GR05	Sérrai Prefecture
GR06	Kilkís Prefecture
GR07	Pélla Prefecture
GR08	Flórina Prefecture
GR09	Kastoriá Prefecture
GR10	Grevená Prefecture
GR11	Kozáni Prefecture
GR12	Imathía Prefecture
GR13	Thessaloníki Prefecture
GR14	Kavála Prefecture
GR15	Chalkidikí Prefecture
GR16	Piería Prefecture
GR17	Ioánnina Prefecture
GR18	Thesprotía Prefecture
GR19	Préveza Prefecture
GR20	Árta Prefecture
GR21	Lárisa Prefecture
GR22	Tríkala Prefecture
GR23	Kardítsa Prefecture
GR24	Magnisía Prefecture
GR25	Kérkyra Prefecture
GR26	Lefkás Prefecture
GR27	Kefallinía Prefecture
GR28	Zákynthos Prefecture
GR29	Fthiótis Prefecture
GR30	Evrytanía Prefecture
GR31	Aitolía kai Akarnanía Prefecture
GR32	Fokídos Prefecture
GR33	Voiotía Prefecture
GR34	Évvoia Prefecture
GR35	Attikí Prefecture
GR36	Argolís Prefecture
GR37	Korinthía Prefecture
GR38	Achaḯa Prefecture
GR39	Ileía Prefecture
GR40	Messinía Prefecture
GR41	Arkadía Prefecture
GR42	Lakonía Prefecture
GR43	Chaníon Prefecture
GR44	Rethýmnis Prefecture
GR45	Irákleion Prefecture
GR46	Lasíthi Prefecture
GR47	Dodekánisos Prefecture
GR48	Sámos Prefecture
GR49	Kykládes Prefecture
GR50	Chíos Prefecture
GR51	Lésvos Prefecture

== GT: Guatemala ==
FIPS Code	Region
GT01	Alta Verapaz Department
GT02	Baja Verapaz Department
GT03	Chimaltenango Department
GT04	Chiquimula Department
GT05	El Progreso Department
GT06	Escuintla Department
GT07	Guatemala Department
GT08	Huehuetenango Department
GT09	Izabal Department
GT10	Jalapa Department
GT11	Jutiapa Department
GT12	Petén Department
GT13	Quetzaltenango Department
GT14	Quiché Department
GT15	Retalhuleu Department
GT16	Sacatepéquez Department
GT17	San Marcos Department
GT18	Santa Rosa Department
GT19	Solola Department
GT20	Suchitepéquez Department
GT21	Totonicapán Department
GT22	Zacapa Department

== GV: Guinea ==
FIPS Code	Region
GV01	Beyla Prefecture
GV02	Boffa Prefecture
GV03	Boké Prefecture
GV04	Conakry Special Zone
GV05	Dabola Prefecture
GV06	Dalaba Prefecture
GV07	Dinguiraye Prefecture
GV09	Faranah Prefecture
GV10	Forécariah Prefecture
GV11	Fria Prefecture
GV12	Gaoual Prefecture
GV13	Guékédou Prefecture
GV15	Kérouané Prefecture
GV16	Kindia Prefecture
GV17	Kissidougou Prefecture
GV18	Koundara Prefecture
GV19	Kouroussa Prefecture
GV21	Macenta Prefecture
GV22	Mali Prefecture
GV23	Mamou Prefecture
GV25	Pita Prefecture
GV27	Télimélé Prefecture
GV28	Tougué Prefecture
GV29	Yomou Prefecture
GV30	Coyah Prefecture
GV31	Dubréka Prefecture
GV32	Kankan Prefecture
GV33	Koubia Prefecture
GV34	Labé Prefecture
GV35	Lélouma Prefecture
GV36	Lola Prefecture
GV37	Mandiana Prefecture
GV38	Nzérékoré Prefecture
GV39	Siguiri Prefecture

== GY: Guyana ==
FIPS Code	Region
GY10	Barima-Waini Region
GY11	Cuyuni-Mazaruni Region
GY12	Demerara-Mahaica Region
GY13	East Berbice-Corentyne Region
GY14	Essequibo Islands-West Demerara Region
GY15	Mahaica-Berbice Region
GY16	Pomeroon-Supenaam Region
GY17	Potaro-Siparuni Region
GY18	Upper Demerara-Berbice Region
GY19	Upper Takutu-Upper Essequibo Region

== HA: Haiti ==
FIPS Code	Region
HA03	Nord-Ouest Department, Haiti
HA06	Artibonite Department, Haiti
HA07	Centre Department, Haiti
HA09	Nord Department, Haiti
HA10	Nord-Est Department, Haiti
HA11	Ouest Department, Haiti
HA12	Sud Department, Haiti
HA13	Sud-Est Department, Haiti
HA14	Grand'Anse Department, Haiti
HA15	Nippes Department, Haiti

== HO: Honduras ==
FIPS Code	Region
HO01	Atlántida Department
HO02	Choluteca Department
HO03	Colón Department
HO04	Comayagua Department
HO05	Copán Department
HO06	Cortés Department
HO07	El Paraíso Department
HO08	Francisco Morazán Department
HO09	Gracias a Dios Department
HO10	Intibucá Department
HO11	Islas de la Bahía Department
HO12	La Paz Department
HO13	Lempira Department
HO14	Ocotepeque Department
HO15	Olancho Department
HO16	Santa Bárbara Department
HO17	Valle Department
HO18	Yoro Department

== HK: Hong Kong ==
FIPS Code	Region
HK	Hong Kong

== HR: Croatia ==
FIPS Code	Region
HR01	Bjelovar-Bilogora County
HR02	Brod-Posavina County
HR03	Dubrovnik-Neretva County
HR04	Istria County
HR05	Karlovac County
HR06	Koprivnica-Križevci County
HR07	Krapina-Zagorje County
HR08	Lika-Senj County
HR09	Međimurje County
HR10	Osijek-Baranja County
HR11	Požega-Slavonia County
HR12	Primorje-Gorski Kotar County
HR13	Šibenik-Knin County
HR14	Sisak-Moslavina County
HR15	Split-Dalmatia County
HR16	Varaždin County
HR17	Virovitica-Podravina County
HR18	Vukovar-Srijem County
HR19	Zadar County
HR20	Zagreb County
HR21	Zagreb City

== HU: Hungary ==
FIPS Code	Region
HU01	Bács-Kiskun County
HU02	Baranya County
HU04	Borsod-Abaúj-Zemplén County
HU05	Budapest Capital City
HU06	Csongrád County
HU07	Debrecen Urban County
HU08	Fejér County
HU09	Győr-Moson-Sopron County
HU10	Hajdú-Bihar County
HU11	Heves County
HU12	Komárom-Esztergom County
HU13	Miskolc Urban County
HU14	Nógrád County
HU15	Pécs Urban County
HU16	Pest County
HU17	Somogy County
HU18	Szabolcs-Szatmár-Bereg County
HU19	Szeged Urban County
HU20	Jász-Nagykun-Szolnok County
HU21	Tolna County
HU22	Vas County
HU23	Veszprém County
HU24	Zala County
HU25	Győr Urban County
HU26	Békéscsaba Urban County
HU27	Dunaújváros Urban County
HU28	Eger Urban County
HU29	Hódmezővásárhely Urban County
HU30	Kaposvár Urban County
HU31	Kecskemét Urban County
HU32	Nagykanizsa Urban County
HU33	Nyíregyháza Urban County
HU34	Sopron Urban County
HU35	Székesfehérvár Urban County
HU36	Szolnok Urban County
HU37	Szombathely Urban County
HU38	Tatabánya Urban County
HU39	Veszprém Urban County
HU40	Zalaegerszeg Urban County
HU41	Salgótarján County
HU42	Szekszárd County
HU43	Érd County

== IC: Iceland ==
FIPS Code	Region
IC38	Eastern Region
IC39	Capital Region
IC40	Northeastern Region
IC41	Northwestern Region
IC42	Southern Region
IC43	Southern Peninsula
IC44	Westfjords
IC45	Western Region

== ID: Indonesia ==
FIPS Code	Region
ID01	Aceh Special Region
ID02	Bali Province
ID03	Bengkulu Province
ID04	Jakarta Raya Special Capital City District
ID05	Jambi Province
ID07	Jawa Tengah Province
ID08	Jawa Timur Province
ID10	Yogyakarta Special Region
ID11	Kalimantan Barat Province
ID12	Kalimantan Selatan Province
ID13	Kalimantan Tengah Province
ID14	Kalimantan Timur Province
ID15	Lampung Province
ID17	Nusa Tenggara Barat Province
ID18	Nusa Tenggara Timur Province
ID21	Sulawesi Tengah Province
ID22	Sulawesi Tenggara Province
ID24	Sumatera Barat Province
ID26	Sumatera Utara Province
ID28	Maluku Province
ID29	Maluku Utara Province
ID30	Jawa Barat Province
ID31	Sulawesi Utara Province
ID32	Sumatera Selatan Province
ID33	Banten Province
ID34	Gorontalo Province
ID35	Kepulauan Bangka Belitung Province
ID36	Papua Province
ID37	Riau Province
ID38	Sulawesi Selatan Province
ID39	Papua Barat Province
ID40	Kepulauan Riau Province
ID41	Sulawesi Barat Province

== IN: India ==
FIPS Code	Region
IN01	Andaman and Nicobar Islands Union Territory
IN02	Andhra Pradesh State
IN03	Assam State
IN05	Chandigarh Union Territory
IN07	Delhi Union Territory
IN09	Gujarat State
IN10	Haryana State
IN11	Himachal Pradesh State
IN12	Jammu and Kashmir Union Territory
IN13	Kerala State
IN14	Lakshadweep Union Territory
IN16	Maharashtra State
IN17	Manipur State
IN18	Meghalaya State
IN19	Karnataka State
IN20	Nagaland State
IN21	Odisha State
IN22	Puducherry Union Territory
IN23	Punjab State
IN24	Rajasthan State
IN25	Tamil Nadu State
IN26	Tripura State
IN28	West Bengal State
IN29	Sikkim State
IN30	Arunachal Pradesh State
IN31	Mizoram State
IN33	Goa State
IN34	Bihar State
IN35	Madhya Pradesh State
IN36	Uttar Pradesh State
IN37	Chhattisgarh State
IN38	Jharkhand State
IN39	Uttarakhand State
IN40	Telangana State
IN41	Ladakh Union Territory
IN42	Dadra and Nagar Haveli and Daman and Diu Union Territory

== IR: Iran ==
FIPS Code	Region
IR01	Āz̄arbāyjān-e Gharbī Province
IR03	Chahār Maḩāll va Bakhtīār Province
IR04	Sīstān va Balūchestān Province
IR05	Kohgīlūyeh va Būyer Aḩmad Province
IR07	Fārs Province
IR08	Gīlān Province
IR09	Hamadān Province
IR10	Īlām Province
IR11	Hormozgān Province
IR13	Kermānshāh Province
IR15	Khūzestān Province
IR16	Kordestān Province
IR22	Būshehr Province
IR23	Lorestān Province
IR25	Semnān Province
IR26	Tehrān Province
IR28	Eşfahān Province
IR29	Kermān Province
IR32	Ardabīl Province
IR33	Āz̄arbāyjān-e Sharqī Province
IR34	Markaz Province
IR35	Māzandarān Province
IR36	Zanjān Province
IR37	Golestān Province
IR38	Qazvīn Province
IR39	Qom Province
IR40	Yazd Province
IR41	Khorāsān-e Janūbī Province
IR42	Khorāsān-e Razavī Province
IR43	Khorāsān-e Shemālī Province
IR44	Alborz Province

== IS: Israel ==
FIPS Code	Region
IS01	HaDarom District
IS02	HaMerkaz District
IS03	HaTzafon District
IS04	Hefa District
IS05	Tel Aviv District
IS06	Yerushalayim District

== IT: Italy ==
FIPS Code	Region
IT01	Abruzzo Region
IT02	Basilicata Region
IT03	Calabria Region
IT04	Campania Region
IT05	Emilia-Romagna Region
IT06	Friuli-Venezia Giulia Autonomous Region
IT07	Lazio Region
IT08	Liguria Region
IT09	Lombardia Region
IT10	Marche Region
IT11	Molise Region
IT12	Piemonte Region
IT13	Puglia Region
IT14	Sardegna Autonomous Region
IT15	Sicilia Autonomous Region
IT16	Toscana Region
IT17	Trentino-Alto Adige/Südtirol Autonomous Region
IT18	Umbria Region
IT19	Valle d'Aosta Autonomous Region
IT20	Veneto Region

== IV: Côte d'Ivoire ==
FIPS Code	Region
IV74	Agnéby
IV75	Bafing
IV76	Bas-Sassandra
IV77	Denguélé
IV78	Dix-Huit Montagnes
IV79	Fromager
IV80	Haut-Sassandra
IV81	Lacs
IV82	Lagunes
IV83	Marahoué
IV84	Moyen-Cavally
IV85	Moyen-Comoé
IV86	N'zi-Comoé
IV87	Savanes
IV88	Sud-Bandama
IV89	Sud-Comoé
IV90	Vallée du Bandama
IV91	Worodougou
IV92	Zanzan

== IZ: Iraq ==
FIPS Code	Region
IZ01	Al Anbār Governorate
IZ02	Al Başrah Governorate
IZ03	Al Muthanná Governorate
IZ04	Al Qādisīyah Governorate
IZ05	As Sulaymānīyah Governorate
IZ06	Bābil Governorate
IZ07	Baghdād Governorate
IZ08	Dahūk Governorate
IZ09	Dhī Qār Governorate
IZ10	Diyālá Governorate
IZ11	Arbīl Governorate
IZ12	Karbalā' Governorate
IZ13	At Ta'mīm Governorate
IZ14	Maysān Governorate
IZ15	Nīnawá Governorate
IZ16	Wāsiţ Governorate
IZ17	An Najaf Governorate
IZ18	Şalāḩ ad Dīn Governorate

== See also ==
- List of FIPS region codes (A-C)
- List of FIPS region codes (D-F)
- List of FIPS region codes (J-L)
- List of FIPS region codes (M-O)
- List of FIPS region codes (P-R)
- List of FIPS region codes (S-U)
- List of FIPS region codes (V-Z)

== Sources ==
- FIPS 10-4 Codes and history
  - Last version of codes
  - All codes (include earlier versions)
  - Table to see the evolution of the codes over time
- Administrative Divisions of Countries ("Statoids"), Statoids.com
