= Subdivisions of Botswana =

Botswana is divided into 10 districts.

1. Central District
2. Ghanzi District
3. Kgalagadi District
4. Kgatleng District
5. Kweneng District
6. North-East District
7. North-West District
8. South-East District
9. Southern District
10. Chobe District (Separated from North-West District)
