= Subdivisions of Angola =

Administrative divisions of Angola

After the changes introduced in late 2024, Angola is divided into twenty-one provinces (províncias), which are further subdivided into 326 municipalities (municípios), some of which are in turn further subdivided into communes (comunas), of which there is a total of 378.

== Provinces ==
Map of Angolan provinces

- Bengo
- Benguela
- Bié
- Cabinda
- Cuando
- Cubango
- Cuanza Norte
- Cuanza Sul
- Cunene
- Huambo
- Huila
- Icolo e Bengo
- Luanda
- Lunda Norte
- Lunda Sul
- Malanje
- Moxico
- Moxico Leste
- Namibe
- Uíge
- Zaire
