= List of FIPS region codes (V–Z) =

This is a list of FIPS 10-4 region codes from V-Z, using a standardized name format, and cross-linking to articles.

On September 2, 2008, FIPS 10-4 was one of ten standards withdrawn by NIST as a Federal Information Processing Standard. The list here is the last version of codes. For earlier versions, see link below.

== VC: Saint Vincent and the Grenadines ==
FIPS Code	Region
VC01	Charlotte Parish, Saint Vincent and the Grenadines
VC02	Saint Andrew Parish, Saint Vincent and the Grenadines
VC03	Saint David Parish, Saint Vincent and the Grenadines
VC04	Saint George Parish, Saint Vincent and the Grenadines
VC05	Saint Patrick Parish, Saint Vincent and the Grenadines
VC06	Grenadines Parish, Saint Vincent and the Grenadines

== VE: Venezuela ==
FIPS Code	Region
VE01	Amazonas State, Venezuela
VE02	Anzoátegui State, Venezuela
VE03	Apure State, Venezuela
VE04	Aragua State, Venezuela
VE05	Barinas State, Venezuela
VE06	Bolívar State, Venezuela
VE07	Carabobo State, Venezuela
VE08	Cojedes State, Venezuela
VE09	Delta Amacuro State, Venezuela
VE11	Falcón State, Venezuela
VE12	Guárico State, Venezuela
VE13	Lara State, Venezuela
VE14	Mérida State, Venezuela
VE15	Miranda State, Venezuela
VE16	Monagas State, Venezuela
VE17	Nueva Esparta State, Venezuela
VE18	Portuguesa State, Venezuela
VE19	Sucre State, Venezuela
VE20	Táchira State, Venezuela
VE21	Trujillo State, Venezuela
VE22	Yaracuy State, Venezuela
VE23	Zulia State, Venezuela
VE24	Dependencias Federales Federal Dependency, Venezuela
VE25	Distrito Federal Federal District, Venezuela
VE26	Estado Vargas, Venezuela

== VM: Vietnam ==
FIPS Code	Region
VM01	An Giang province
VM03	Bến Tre province
VM05	Cao Bằng province
VM09	Đồng Tháp province
VM13	Hải Phòng Municipality
VM20	Hồ Chí Minh Municipality
VM21	Kiên Giang province
VM23	Lâm Đồng province
VM24	Long An province
VM30	Quảng Ninh province
VM32	Sơn La province
VM33	Tây Ninh province
VM34	Thanh Hóa province
VM35	Thái Bình province
VM37	Tiền Giang province
VM39	Lạng Sơn province
VM43	Đồng Nai province
VM44	Hà Nội Municipality
VM45	Bà Rịa–Vũng Tàu province
VM46	Bình Định province
VM47	Bình Thuận province
VM49	Gia Lai province
VM50	Hà Giang province
VM51	Hà Tây province
VM52	Hà Tĩnh province
VM53	Hòa Bình province
VM54	Khánh Hòa province
VM55	Kon Tum province
VM58	Nghệ An province
VM59	Ninh Bình province
VM60	Ninh Thuận province
VM61	Phú Yên province
VM62	Quảng Bình province
VM63	Quảng Ngãi province
VM64	Quảng Trị province
VM65	Sóc Trăng province
VM66	Thừa Thiên–Huế province
VM67	Trà Vinh province
VM68	Tuyên Quang province
VM69	Vĩnh Long province
VM70	Yên Bái province
VM71	Bắc Giang province
VM72	Bắc Kạn province
VM73	Bạc Liêu province
VM74	Bắc Ninh province
VM75	Bình Dương province
VM76	Bình Phước province
VM77	Cà Mau province
VM78	Đà Nẵng Municipality
VM79	Hải Dương province
VM80	Hà Nam province
VM81	Hưng Yên province
VM82	Nam Định province
VM83	Phú Thọ province
VM84	Quảng Nam province
VM85	Thái Nguyên province
VM86	Vĩnh Phúc province
VM87	Cần Thơ Municipality
VM88	Đắk Lắk province
VM89	Lai Châu province
VM90	Lào Cai province
VM91	Đắk Nông province
VM92	Điện Biên province
VM93	Hậu Giang province

== WA: Namibia ==
FIPS Code	Region
WA21	Khomas Region, Namibia
WA28	Zambezi Region, Namibia
WA29	Erongo Region, Namibia
WA30	Hardap Region, Namibia
WA31	ǁKaras Region, Namibia
WA32	Kunene Region, Namibia
WA33	Ohangwena Region, Namibia
WA34	Okavango Region, Namibia
WA35	Omaheke Region, Namibia
WA36	Omusati Region, Namibia
WA37	Oshana Region, Namibia
WA38	Oshikoto Region, Namibia
WA39	Otjozondjupa Region, Namibia

== WS: Samoa ==
FIPS Code	Region
WS01	A'ana District, Samoa
WS02	Aiga-i-le-Tai District, Samoa
WS03	Atua District, Samoa
WS04	Fa'asaleleaga District, Samoa
WS05	Gaga'emauga District, Samoa
WS06	Va'a-o-Fonoti District, Samoa
WS07	Gagaifomauga District, Samoa
WS08	Palauli District, Samoa
WS09	Satupa'itea District, Samoa
WS10	Tuamasaga District, Samoa
WS11	Vaisigano District, Samoa

== WZ: Eswatini ==
FIPS Code	Region
WZ01	Hhohho District, Eswatini
WZ02	Lubombo District, Eswatini
WZ03	Manzini District, Eswatini
WZ04	Shiselweni District, Eswatini

== YM: Yemen ==
FIPS Code	Region
YM01	Abyan Governorate, Yemen
YM02	Adan Governorate, Yemen
YM03	Al Mahrah Governorate, Yemen
YM04	Ḩaḑramawt Governorate, Yemen
YM05	Shabwah Governorate, Yemen
YM08	Al Ḩudaydah Governorate, Yemen
YM10	Al Mahwit Governorate, Yemen
YM11	Dhamar Governorate, Yemen
YM14	Ma'rib Governorate, Yemen
YM15	Sa'dah Governorate, Yemen
YM16	San‘a’ Governorate, Yemen
YM18	Ad Dali' Governorate, Yemen
YM19	'Amran Governorate, Yemen
YM20	Al Bayḑā' Governorate, Yemen
YM21	Al Jawf Governorate, Yemen
YM22	Hajjah Governorate, Yemen
YM23	Ibb Governorate, Yemen
YM24	Lahij Governorate, Yemen
YM25	Ta'izz Governorate, Yemen

== ZA: Zambia ==
FIPS Code	Region
ZA01	Western Province, Zambia
ZA02	Central Province, Zambia
ZA03	Eastern Province, Zambia
ZA04	Luapula Province, Zambia
ZA05	Northern Province, Zambia
ZA06	North-Western Province, Zambia
ZA07	Southern Province, Zambia
ZA08	Copperbelt Province, Zambia
ZA09	Lusaka Province, Zambia

== ZI: Zimbabwe ==
FIPS Code	Region
ZI01	Manicaland Province, Zimbabwe
ZI02	Midlands Province, Zimbabwe
ZI03	Mashonaland Central Province, Zimbabwe
ZI04	Mashonaland East Province, Zimbabwe
ZI05	Mashonaland West Province, Zimbabwe
ZI06	Matabeleland North Province, Zimbabwe
ZI07	Matabeleland South Province, Zimbabwe
ZI08	Masvingo Province, Zimbabwe
ZI09	Bulawayo Province, Zimbabwe
ZI10	Harare Province, Zimbabwe

== See also ==
- List of FIPS region codes (A-C)
- List of FIPS region codes (D-F)
- List of FIPS region codes (G-I)
- List of FIPS region codes (J–L)
- List of FIPS region codes (M-O)
- List of FIPS region codes (P-R)
- List of FIPS region codes (S–U)

== Sources ==
- FIPS 10-4 Codes and history
  - Last version of codes
  - All codes (include earlier versions)
  - Table to see the evolution of the codes over time
- Administrative Divisions of Countries ("Statoids"), Statoids.com
