= FIPS 10-4 =

Withdrawn Federal Information Processing Standard

The FIPS 10-4 standard, Countries, Dependencies, Areas of Special Sovereignty, and Their Principal Administrative Divisions, was a list of two-letter country codes that were used by the U.S. Government for geographical data processing in many publications, such as the CIA World Factbook. The standard was also known as DAFIF 0413 ed 7 Amdt. No. 3 (November 2003) and as DIA 65-18 (Defense Intelligence Agency, 1994, "Geopolitical Data Elements and Related Features").

The FIPS 10-4 codes are similar to (but sometimes incompatible with) the ISO 3166-1 alpha-2 country codes. The standard also includes codes for the top-level subdivision of the countries, similar to but usually incompatible with the ISO 3166-2 standard.

== History ==
On September 2, 2008, FIPS 10-4 was one of ten standards withdrawn by NIST as a Federal Information Processing Standard. The National Geospatial-Intelligence Agency continued to maintain the FIPS 10-4 codes in an informal document titled "Geopolitical Entities and Codes" (GEC) until December 31, 2014, retiring the GEC on March 31, 2015.

On January 23, 2013, the U.S. Department of Defense released the first edition of "Geopolitical Entities, Names and Codes" (GENC), a U.S. federal government profile of ISO 3166-1 and ISO 3166-2. GENC is designed to be compatible with ISO 3166 but reflect U.S. government diplomatic recognition and naming decisions by the U.S. Board on Geographic Names; it is intended to be the basis for a future U.S. national profile of the ISO standards.

== See also ==
- List of FIPS country codes
- List of FIPS region codes
