= List of political and geographic subdivisions by total area from 20,000 to 50,000 square kilometers =

This is one of a series of comprehensive lists of continents, countries, and first level administrative country subdivisions such as states, provinces, and territories, as well as certain political and geographic features of substantial area. References for the information provided in this table may be found in the individual articles on each body listed herein. Some divisions are listed twice, with one listing including territory that is excluded in the other for various reasons, including territorial disputes. There is intentional overlap among the lists in order to maximize ease of use.

Geographic entity	Area (km^{2})	Notes
(Central African Republic) Ouaka	49,900	Prefecture of the Central African Republic.
Smolensk Oblast	49,800	Federal subject of Russia.
Bago Region	49,787	Second largest region of Myanmar, fourth largest administrative entity (Myanmar has certain administrative divisions titled as Regions, and others titled as States).
(Jämtland County) Jamtland County	49,444	Third largest county of Sweden.
(Tanzania) Singida	49,341	Region of Tanzania.
Benishangul-Gumuz Region	49,289	Region of Ethiopia.
(Zimbabwe) Midlands	49,166	Province of Zimbabwe.
(Antarctica) Alexander Island	49,070	Island part of Antarctica.
Slovakia	49,033	Country in Europe.
(Russia) Severny Island	48,904	Island part of Novaya Zemlya in Russia.
Eastern Finland	48,726	Second smallest province of Finland.
(Bulgan Province) Bulgan	48,700	Aimag of Mongolia.
Dominican Republic	48,671	Country in the Caribbean. Includes The Mainland Dominican Republic, Saona Island, and others under Control Of Dominican Government
Finnmark	48,637	Largest county of Norway.
(Afghanistan) Farah Province	48,471	Province of Afghanistan.
(Namibia) Okavango Region	48,463	Region of Namibia.
(Nigeria) Bauchi State	48,197	State of Nigeria.
Tierra del Fuego	48,100	Archipelago in southern South America.
Isla Grande de Tierra del Fuego	47,992	Island divided between Chile and Argentina.
East Java	47,922	Province of Indonesia.
(Tanzania) Manyara	47,913	Region of Tanzania.
East Nusa Tenggara	47,876	Province of Indonesia.
Bourgogne-Franche-Comté	47,784	Region of France.
Aragon	47,719	Autonomous community of Spain.
Lower Saxony	47,618	Second largest state of Germany.
Estonia	47,549	Country in Northern Europe. De jure size – 2,321 km^{2} were annexed by Russia.
(Cameroon) South Province	47,110	Province of Cameroon.
Maluku	46,975	Province of Indonesia.
Muisca Confederation	46,972	Loose confederation of Muisca speaking chiefdoms in central Colombia until 1540
(Chad) Wadi Fira	46,850	Region of Chad.
(Mauritania) Inchiri	46,800	Region of Mauritania.
Chocó Department	46,530	District of Colombia.
(Central African Republic) Vakaga	46,500	Prefecture of the Central African Republic.
Espírito Santo	46,078	State of Brazil.
(Gabon) Ogooué-Ivindo	46,075	Largest province of Gabon.
Galmudug	46,000	Historic region of Somalia.
Moscow Oblast	45,900	Federal subject of Russia.
(Sudan) Blue Nile	45,844	State of Sudan.
(Bayan-Ölgii Province) Bayan-Ölgii	45,700	Aimag of Mongolia.
(Iran) East Azarbaijan Province	45,650	Province of Iran.
(Angola) Lunda Sul Province	45,649	Province of Angola.
Kingdom of Asturias	45,409	A post Visigothic Kingdom in the Iberian peninsula after the Muslim conquest, lasting from 785–925.
Estonia	45,228	Country in Northern Europe. Includes 1,520 islands in the Baltic Sea. De facto size – the remaining 2,321 km^{2} were annexed by Russia.
(Tanzania) Kigoma	45,066	Region of Tanzania.
(Nigeria) Yobe State	44,880	State of Nigeria.
Magway Region	44,799	Region of Myanmar (Myanmar has certain administrative divisions titled as Regions, and others titled as States).
Casanare Department	44,640	District of Colombia.
(New Zealand) Canterbury	44,638	Largest region of New Zealand.
(Nigeria) Kaduna State	44,217	State of Nigeria.
Haryana	44,212	State of India.
Naryn Region	44,160	Largest region of Kyrgyzstan.
Astrakhan Oblast	44,100	Federal subject of Russia.
(Afghanistan) Badakhshan Province	44,059	Province of Afghanistan.
(Antarctica) Berkner Island	43,873	Island part of Antarctica.
(Department of Ayacucho) Ayacucho Region	43,815	Region of Peru.
Transkei	43,798	Unrecognised Bantustan of South Africa.
Issyk-Kul Region	43,735	Second largest region of Kyrgyzstan.
Rio de Janeiro	43,696	State of Brazil.
East Sepik Province	43,426	Second largest province of Papua New Guinea.
Tanintharyi Region	43,328	Region of Myanmar (Myanmar has certain administrative divisions titled as Regions, and others titled as States).
Anzoátegui	43,300	State of Venezuela.
Penza Oblast	43,200	Federal subject of Russia.
(Canada) Axel Heiberg Island	43,178	Island in the Arctic Archipelago.
Denmark	43,094	Country in Europe. Includes Denmark proper only; the entire Kingdom of Denmark, including Greenland and Faroe Islands covers 2,220,093 km^{2}.
(Madagascar) Antsiranana Province	43,046	Smallest Province of Madagascar.
(Senegal) Tambacounda Region	42,706	Largest region of Senegal.
Upper Peninsula of Michigan	42,610	Geographic subdivision of the U.S. State of Michigan.
Kingdom of the Netherlands	42,437	Country in Europe and the Caribbean.
Southern Cameroons	42,383	Area claimed by the Republic of Ambazonia in Cameroon.
West Sumatra	42,297	Province of Indonesia.
(Canada) Melville Island	42,149	Island in the Arctic Archipelago.
Udmurt Republic	42,100	Federal subject of Russia.
(Republic of the Congo) Cuvette	41,800	Third largest department of the Republic of the Congo. Area is approximate, as sources conflict.
Extremadura	41,634	Autonomous community of Spain.
Netherlands	41,528	Country in Europe. Includes the Netherlands proper only.
(Tanzania) Dodoma	41,311	Region of Tanzania.
Switzerland	41,284	Country in Europe.
(Canada) Southampton Island	41,214	Island in the Arctic Archipelago.
(Selenge Province) Selenge	41,200	Aimag of Mongolia.
(Tarapacá Region) Tarapacá	41,200	Region of Chile.
(Afghanistan) Nimruz Province	41,005	Province of Afghanistan.
(Syria) Homs	40,940	Largest governorate of Syria.
Minsk Region	40,800	Largest province of Belarus.
Gomel Region (Homiel Region)	40,400	Second largest province of Belarus.
(Lakes (state)) Lakes	40,235	State of South Sudan.
(Ivory Coast) Savanes District	40,210	Largest district of Côte d'Ivoire.
Delta Amacuro	40,200	State of Venezuela.
(Angola) Zaire Province	40,130	Province of Angola.
(Brazil) Marajó	40,100	Island part of Brazil, world's largest fluvial island.
Vitebsk Region (Vitsebsk Region)	40,100	Third largest province of Belarus.
(Coquimbo Region) Coquimbo	39,647	Region of Chile.
(Tanzania) Kagera	39,627	Region of Tanzania.
Ryazan Oblast	39,600	Federal subject of Russia.
(Ghana) Brong-Ahafo Region	39,557	Second largest region of Ghana.
(Yemen) Al Jawf Governorate	39,500	Third largest governorate of Yemen.
Eastern Region, Uganda	39,478.8	Smallest region of Uganda.
(Uzbekistan) Buxoro Region	39,400	Third largest region of Uzbekistan.
(Peru) Amazonas	39,249	Department of Peru
Centre-Val de Loire	39,151	Region of France.
(Yemen) Shabwah Governorate	39,000	Governorate of Yemen.
(Norway) Spitsbergen	38,981	Island part of Svalbard, Norway.
Kerala	38,863	State of India.
(Namibia) Oshikoto Region	38,653	Region of Namibia.
(Niger) Maradi Department	38,581	Department of Niger.
(Gabon) Woleu-Ntem	38,465	Second largest province of Gabon.
Nordland	38,463	County of Norway.
Yucatán	38,402	State of Mexico.
(Republic of the Congo) Plateaux	38,400	Department of the Republic of the Congo.
Bhutan	38,394	Country in Asia.
(Ivory Coast) Zanzan District	38,251	Second largest district of Côte d'Ivoire.
(Turkey) Konya Province	38,157	Largest province of Turkey.
Southeast Sulawesi	38,140	Province of Indonesia.
(Nigeria) Adamawa State	37,957	State of Nigeria.
(Sudan) Sennar	37,844	State of Sudan.
(Gabon) Ngounié	37,750	Third largest province of Gabon.
Junín Region	37,667	Region of Peru.
(Guinea) Nzérékoré Region	37,658	Second largest region of Guinea.
Tarija Department	37,623	Smallest department of Bolivia.
(Iran) West Azarbaijan Province	37,437	Province of Iran.
Ulyanovsk Oblast	37,300	Federal subject of Russia.
Polynesia	37,141	An island chain subdivision of Oceania, including Hawaii.
(Namibia) Khomas Region	37,007	Region of Namibia.
(Oman) Ad Dhahirah Governorate	37,000	Second largest governorate of Oman.
South Kalimantan	36,985	Province of Indonesia.
(Peru) Huánuco Region	36,849	Region of Peru.
(Japan) Kyushu	36,782	Third-largest island of Japan, region containing the prefectures of Fukuoka, Saga, Nagasaki, Kumamoto, Ōita, Miyazaki, Kagoshima and Okinawa.
Rakhine State	36,762	State of Myanmar (Myanmar has certain administrative divisions titled as Regions, and others titled as States).
(Sudan) Kassala	36,710	State of Sudan.
(Mauritania) Assaba	36,600	Region of Mauritania.
(Gabon) Haut-Ogooué	36,547	Province of Gabon.
(Afghanistan) Ghor Province	36,479	Province of Afghanistan.
(Zimbabwe) Manicaland	36,459	Third smallest province of Zimbabwe.
Yaroslavl Oblast	36,400	Federal subject of Russia.
Ash Sharqiyah Region (Oman)	36,400	Largest region of Oman.
Nigeria Kebbi State	36,320	State of Nigeria.
Republic of China	36,188	Territory with disputed status in Asia. Includes only the territories under the administration of the ROC, namely Taiwan, Penghu, Kinmen, and Matsu.
Guinea-Bissau	36,125	Country in Africa.
Chin State	36,009	State of Myanmar (Myanmar has certain administrative divisions titled as Regions, and others titled as States).
(Biobío Region) Biobío	36,007	Region of Chile.
Jewish Autonomous Oblast	36,000	Federal subject of Russia.
Pahang	35,964	Third largest state of Malaysia.
(Unity State) Unity	35,956	State of South Sudan.
Northern Province, Sierra Leone	35,936	Largest province of Sierra Leone.
Ancash Region	35,914	Region of Peru.
(Department of Piura) Piura Region	35,892	Region of Peru.
(Botswana) Kweneng District	35,890	District of Botswana.
(Petén Department) Petén	35,854	Largest department of Guatemala.
Sandaun Province	35,820	Third largest province of Papua New Guinea.
Taiwan	35,801	Largest island under the governance of the Republic of China, referenced elsewhere in this list.
Baden-Württemberg	35,752	Third largest state of Germany.
Masovian Voivodeship (Mazowieckie)	35,728	Largest Voivodeship of Poland.
(Guinea) Faranah Region	35,581	Third largest region of Guinea.
Lampung	35,376	Province of Indonesia.
(China) Hainan	35,354	Smallest province of China.
Barinas	35,200	State of Venezuela.
Ayeyarwady Region	35,167	Region of Myanmar (Myanmar has certain administrative divisions titled as Regions, and others titled as States).
(Papua New Guinea) New Britain	35,145	Island part of Papua New Guinea.
Maakhir	35,000	Historic region of Somalia.
Bryansk Oblast	34,900	Federal subject of Russia.
West Java	34,817	Province of Indonesia.
Lima Region	34,802	Region of Peru.
(Tanzania) Arusha	34,516	Region of Tanzania.
Gulf Province	34,472	Province of Papua New Guinea.
Southern Finland	34,378	Smallest province of Finland.
Tambov Oblast	34,300	Federal subject of Russia.
(Angola) Huambo Province	34,274	Province of Angola.
Mandalay Region	34,253	Region of Myanmar (Myanmar has certain administrative divisions titled as Regions, and others titled as States).
(Cameroon) Far North Province	34,246	Province of Cameroon.
(Bangladesh) Rajshahi Division	34,235	Largest division of Bangladesh.
North Rhine-Westphalia	34,043	State of Germany.
(China) Hainan	34,000	Province of China.
(Republic of the Congo) Pool	33,955	Department of the Republic of the Congo.
Puebla	33,902	State of Mexico.
Moldova	33,851	Country in Europe. Includes Transnistria (Pridnestrovie).
(Mauritania) Brakna	33,800	Region of Mauritania.
(Nigeria) Kwara State	33,792	State of Nigeria.
Morobe Province	33,705	Province of Papua New Guinea.
(Nigeria) Zamfara State	33,667	State of Nigeria.
(South Sudan) North Bahr-al-Ghazal	33,558	State of South Sudan.
(Canada) Prince of Wales Island	33,339	Island part of the Arctic Archipelago.
(Department of Cajamarca) Cajamarca Region	33,318	Region of Peru.
Odesa Oblast	33,310	Largest oblast of Ukraine.
Nariño Department	33,268	District of Colombia.
(Russia) Yuzhny Island	33,246	Island part of Novaya Zemlya in Russia.
South Sinai Governorate	33,140	Governorate of Egypt.
(Japan) Kansai region	33,125.7	Region of Japan containing the prefectures of Mie, Shiga, Kyōto, Ōsaka, Hyōgo, Nara and Wakayama.
North Caribbean Coast Autonomous Region	33,106	Largest region of Nicaragua.
(Syria) Deir ez-Zor	33,060	Second largest governorate of Syria.
(Australia) Daly River	33,000	Township in the Northern Territory of Australia.
Lake Tanganyika	32,893	Lake in Africa between Tanzania, Democratic Republic of the Congo, Burundi, and Zambia; second deepest lake in the world.
(Bangladesh) Chittagong Division	32,696	Second largest division of Bangladesh.
Central Java	32,548	Province of Indonesia.
(Araucanía Region) Araucanía	32,472	Region of Chile.
(Japan) Kantō region	32,429.59	Region of Japan containing the prefectures of Ibaraki, Tochigi, Gunma, Saitama, Chiba, Tōkyō and Kanagawa.
Jalal-Abad Region	32,418	Region of Kyrgyzstan.
(Tanzania) Pwani	32,407	Region of Tanzania.
Brest Region	32,300	Third smallest province of Belarus.
Minya Governorate	32,279	Governorate of Egypt.
(Zimbabwe) Mashonaland East	32,230	Second smallest province of Zimbabwe.
(Nigeria) Sokoto State	32,146	State of Nigeria.
Maryland	32,133	State of the United States.
Catalonia	32,114	Autonomous community of Spain.
(Central African Republic) Ouham-Pendé	32,100	Prefecture of the Central African Republic.
Pays de la Loire	32,082	Region of France.
(New Zealand) Southland	32,079	Second largest region of New Zealand.
(Greenland) Kujalleq	32,000	Smallest municipality of Greenland.
Dnipropetrovsk Oblast	31,974	Second largest oblast of Ukraine.
(Japan) Chūgoku region	31,921.54	Region of Japan containing the prefectures of Tottori. Shimane, Okayama, Hiroshima and Yamaguchi.
(Oman) Ad Dakhiliyah Governorate	31,900	Third largest governorate of Oman.
Chernihiv Oblast	31,865	Third largest oblast of Ukraine.
(Central African Republic) Ombella-M'Poko	31,835	Prefecture of the Central African Republic.
Hauts-de-France	31,806	Region of France.
(Angola) Benguela Province	31,788	Province of Angola.
Lake Baikal	31,500	Lake in Russia. Deepest and largest volume lake in the world.
Kharkiv Oblast	31,415	Oblast of Ukraine.
Provence-Alpes-Côte d'Azur	31,400	Region of France.
(Angola) Bengo Province	31,371	Province of Angola.
(Zambia) Copperbelt Province	31,328	Province of Zambia.
(British Columbia) Vancouver Island	31,285	Island of British Columbia, Canada
(New Zealand) Otago	31,241	Third largest region of New Zealand.
(Guinea) Boké Region	31,186	Region of Guinea.
(Morocco) Marrakech-Tensift-El Haouz	31,160	Region of Morocco.
(Ivory Coast) Woroba District	31,088	Third largest district of Côte d'Ivoire.
Great Bear Lake	31,080	Lake in Canada.
(Ivory Coast) Montagnes District	31,050	District of Côte d'Ivoire.
(South Sudan) Warap	31,027	State of South Sudan.
(Niger) Dosso Region	31,002	Department of Niger.
North Maluku	30,895	Province of Indonesia.
(Bangladesh) Dhaka Division	30,772	Third largest division of Bangladesh.
(Nigeria) Benue State	30,755	State of Nigeria.
(Tanzania) Mwanza	30,548	Region of Tanzania.
Santander Department	30,537	District of Colombia.
Belgium	30,528	Country in Europe.
(Maule Region) Maule	30,518	Region of Chile.
Guanajuato	30,491	State of Mexico.
(Sudan) White Nile	30,411	State of Sudan.
Lesotho	30,355	Country in Africa.
(Central African Republic) Mambéré-Kadéï	30,203	Prefecture of the Central African Republic.
(Tanzania) Mara	30,150	Region of Tanzania.
Lake Malawi	30,044	Lake in Africa between Malawi, Mozambique, and Tanzania.
Central Province (Papua New Guinea)	29,998	Province of Papua New Guinea.
(Algeria) Naâma Province	29,950	Province of Algeria.
Normandy	29,907	Region of France.
Kaluga Oblast	29,900	Federal subject of Russia.
(Russia) New Siberian Islands	29,900	Archipelago part of Russia.
Greater Poland Voivodeship (Wielkopolskie)	29,854	Second largest Voivodeship of Poland.
Zhytomyr Oblast	29,832	Oblast of Ukraine.
Misiones	29,801	Province of Argentina.
Kursk Oblast	29,800	Federal subject of Russia.
Armenia	29,800	Country in the Caucasus region of Europe.
Galicia	29,574	Autonomous community of Spain.
Brandenburg	29,480	State of Germany.
Cauca Department	29,308	District of Colombia.
(Senegal) Louga Region	29,188	Second largest region of Senegal.
(Iran) Kurdistan Province	29,137	Province of Iran.
(Iran) Markazi Province	29,130	Province of Iran.
Pastaza Province	29,068	Largest province of Ecuador.
(Nigeria) Kogi State	29,063	State of Nigeria.
Vladimir Oblast	29,000	Federal subject of Russia.
Mogilev Region (Mahilyow Region)	29,000	Second smallest province of Belarus.
Osh Region	28,934	Region of Kyrgyzstan.
Monagas	28,930	State of Venezuela.
Great Slave Lake	28,930	Lake in Canada.
Solomon Islands	28,896	Country in Oceania.
Madang Province	28,886	Province of Papua New Guinea.
(Guinea) Kindia Region	28,873	Third smallest region of Guinea.
Poltava Oblast	28,748	Oblast of Ukraine.
Albania	28,748	Country in Europe.
Kayin State	28,726	State of Myanmar (Myanmar has certain administrative divisions titled as Divisions, and others titled as States).
(Tajikistan) Region of Republican Subordination	28,600	Second largest province of Tajikistan.
(Ivory Coast) Vallée du Bandama District	28,518	District of Côte d'Ivoire.
(Ivory Coast) Lacs District	25,800	District of Côte d'Ivoire.
(Turkey) Sivas Province	28,488	Second largest province of Turkey.
(Botswana) Southern	28,470	District of Botswana.
Kherson Oblast	28,461	Oblast of Ukraine.
(Iran) North Khorasan Province	28,434	Province of Iran.
Timor	28,418	Island divided between Indonesia and East Timor.
(Uzbekistan) Qashqadaryo Region	28,400	Region of Uzbekistan.
(Zimbabwe) Mashonaland Central	28,374	Smallest province of Zimbabwe.
Hawaii	28,311	State of the United States.
(Iran) Lorestan Province	28,294	Province of Iran.
Dalarna County	28,194	County of Sweden.
Kyiv Oblast	28,131	Oblast of Ukraine.
Equatorial Guinea	28,051	Country in Africa.
(Chad) Logone Oriental	28,035	Region of Chad.
(Nepal) Karnali Province	27,984	Province of Nepal.
Burundi	27,834	Country in Africa.
Alagoas	27,768	State of Brazil.
Haiti	27,750	Country in the Caribbean.
North Sinai Governorate	27,574	Governorate of Egypt.
Hedmark	27,388	County of Norway.
Massachusetts	27,336	State of the United States.
South Caribbean Coast Autonomous Region	27,260	Second largest region of Nicaragua.
Federally Administered Tribal Areas	27,220	Province of Pakistan.
Brittany	27,208	Region of France.
(Republic of the Congo) Cuvette-Ouest	27,200	Department of the Republic of the Congo. Area is approximate, as sources conflict.
Zaporizhia Oblast	27,180	Oblast of Ukraine.
Belgorod Oblast	27,100	Federal subject of Russia.
(Nigeria) Oyo State	27,036	State of Nigeria.
Nayarit	26,979	State of Mexico.
(Tanzania) Tanga	26,808	Region of Tanzania.
Luhansk Oblast	26,684	Oblast of Ukraine.
(Nigeria) Nasarawa State	26,633	State of Nigeria.
(Central African Republic) Nana-Mambéré	26,600	Prefecture of the Central African Republic.
(Namibia) Omusati	26,573	Region of Namibia.
(Nigeria) Plateau State	26,539	State of Nigeria.
Donetsk Oblast	26,517	Oblast of Ukraine.
Vinnitsa Oblast	26,513	Oblast of Ukraine.
Rwanda	26,338	Country in Africa.
(Benin) Alibori Department	26,242	Largest department of Benin.
Republic of Mordovia	26,200	Federal subject of Russia.
Federation of Bosnia and Herzegovina	26,111	Political entity of Bosnia and Herzegovina.
(Autonomous Republic of Crimea) Crimea	26,081	Autonomous republic of Ukraine.
Bolívar, Colombia	25,978	District of Colombia.
(Republic of the Congo) Niari	25,940	Department of the Republic of the Congo.
Asyut Governorate	25,926	Governorate of Egypt.
(Benin) Borgou Department	25,856	Second largest department of Benin.
Troms	25,848	County of Norway.
Gambela Region	25,802	Region of Ethiopia.
(Ivory Coast) Bas-Sassandra	25,800	District of Côte d'Ivoire.
(Scotland) Highland	25,784	Largest unitary district of Scotland; largest sub-country entity of the United Kingdom.
(Mozambique) Maputo Province	25,756	Smallest non-city province of Mozambique.
Lake Erie	25,719	Lake in North America, between Canada and the United States.
North Macedonia	25,713	Country in Europe.
Kingdom of Sicily	25,708	A medieval kingdom centered on the Island of Sicily, lasting from 1282-1811/1816.
Sicily	25,708	Largest region of Italy.
(Turkey) Ankara Province	25,706	Third largest province of Turkey.
Tula Oblast	25,700	Federal subject of Russia.
(New Zealand) Waikato	25,598	Region of New Zealand.
(La Libertad Department (El Salvador)) La Libertad Region	25,500	Region of Peru.
(Tajikistan) Sughd	25,400	Province of Tajikistan.
Piedmont	25,399	Second largest region of Italy.
(Gabon) Ogooué-Lolo	25,380	Province of Gabon.
(Department of Pasco) Pasco Region	25,320	Region of Peru.
Tabasco	25,267	State of Mexico.
Oppland	25,191	County of Norway.
Lublin Voivodeship (Lubelskie)	25,115	Third largest Voivodeship of Poland.
Taiwan Province	25,110	Largest province of Taiwan.
(Senegal) Matam Region	25,083	Third largest region of Senegal.
(Turkey) Erzurum Province	25,066	Province of Turkey.
(Algeria) Laghouat Province	25,057	Province of Algeria.
Córdoba Department	25,020	District of Colombia.
Grodno Region (Hrodna Region)	25,000	Smallest province of Belarus.
(Iran) Kermanshah Province	24,998	Province of Iran.
Vermont	24,901	State of the United States.
Putumayo Department	24,885	District of Colombia.
Falcón	24,800	State of Venezuela.
(Tajikistan) Khatlon	24,800	Smallest province of Tajikistan.
(Canada) Somerset Island	24,786	Island in the Arctic Archipelago.
Oryol Oblast	24,700	Federal subject of Russia.
Munster	24,608	A historical province of Ireland occupying the southern quarter of the island.
Mykolaiv Oblast	24,598	Oblast of Ukraine.
Kirovohrad Oblast	24,588	Oblast of Ukraine.
(Cameroon) Southwest Province	24,571	Province of Cameroon.
Republika Srpska	24,526	Political entity of Bosnia and Herzegovina.
Ulster	24,481	A historical province of Ireland occupying the northern quarter of the island (all but three counties correspond to Northern Ireland).
(Ghana) Ashanti Region	24,390	Third largest region of Ghana.
Southern Region (Iceland)	24,256	Largest region of Iceland.
(Honduras) Olancho	24,351	Largest department of Honduras.
New Hampshire	24,216	State of the United States.
Cundinamarca Department	24,210	District of Colombia.
(Warmian–Masurian Voivodeship) Warmian-Masurian Voivodeship (Warmińsko-Mazurskie)	24,204	Voivodeship of Poland.
(Angola) Cuanza Norte Province	24,190	Province of Angola.
(Morocco) Taza-Al Hoceima-Taounate	24,155	Region of Morocco.
Lipetsk Oblast	24,100	Federal subject of Russia.
Sardinia	24,090	Third largest region of Italy.
(Russia) Kotelny Island	24,000	Island in the New Siberian Islands, part of Russia.
(Sweden) Västra Götaland County	23,945	County of Sweden.
(Ivory Coast) Sassandra-Marahoué District	23,280	District of Côte d'Ivoire.
(Ghana) Western Region	23,921	Region of Ghana.
(Ecuador) Morona-Santiago	23,875	Second largest province of Ecuador.
Lombardy	23,861	Region of Italy.
Sumy Oblast	23,834	Oblast of Ukraine.
(Nigeria) Katsina State	23,822	State of Nigeria.
Arauca Department	23,818	District of Colombia.
(Iran) Mazandaran Province	23,701	Province of Iran.
Tolima Department	23,562	District of Colombia.
Lake Winnipeg	23,553	Lake in Canada.
(Nigeria) Jigawa State	23,415	State of Nigeria.
(Sudan) Gezira	23,373	State of Sudan.
(Syria) Al-Hasakah	23,334	Third largest governorate of Syria.
(Ivory Coast) Lagunes District	23,280	District of Côte d'Ivoire.
(New Zealand) West Coast	23,276	Region of New Zealand.
Valencian Community	23,255	Autonomous community of Spain.
Mari El Republic	23,200	Federal subject of Russia.
Djibouti	23,200	Country in Africa.
Boyacá Department	23,189	District of Colombia.
Magdalena Department	23,188	District of Colombia.
Mecklenburg-Vorpommern	23,174	State of Germany.
Tuscany	22,997	Region of Italy.
Belize	22,966	Country in Central America.
Central Equatoria	22,956	State of South Sudan.
(Afghanistan) Ghazni Province	22,915	Province of Afghanistan.
Cesar Department	22,905	District of Colombia.
West Pomeranian Voivodeship (Zachodniopomorskie)	22,902	Voivodeship of Poland.
(Gabon) Ogooué-Maritime	22,890	Province of Gabon.
(Guinea) Labé Region	22,869	Second smallest region of Guinea.
(Iran) Bushehr Province	22,743	Province of Iran.
Oro Province	22,735	Province of Papua New Guinea.
Eastern Region (Iceland)	22,721	Second largest region of Iceland.
(Afghanistan) Orūzgān Province	22,696	Province of Afghanistan.
Kingdom of Navarre	22,670	A Spanish Kingdom during the reconquista, lasting from 824–1620.
New Jersey	22,588	State of the United States.
Tucumán	22,524	Province of Argentina.
Meghalaya	22,429	State of India.
(Norway) Nord-Trøndelag	22,396	County of Norway.
Manipur	22,327	State of India.
(Chad) Lac	22,320	Region of Chad.
(Mauritania) Dakhlet Nouadhibou	22,300	Region of Mauritania.
(Nepal) Lumbini Province	22,288	Province of Nepal.
(Iceland) Westfjords	22,271	Third largest region of Iceland.
(New Zealand) Manawatū-Whanganui	22,206	Region of New Zealand.
(Bangladesh) Khulna Division	22,181	Division of Bangladesh.
Israel (including disputed territory)	22,145	Country in Middle East. Including the Golan Heights; excluding the West Bank and Gaza Strip.
(Sudan) Khartoum	22,142	Smallest state of Sudan.
(Valle del Cauca Department) Valle del Cauca	22,140	District of Colombia.
Huancavelica Region	22,131	Region of Peru.
Emilia-Romagna	22,124	Region of Italy.
(Nigeria) Cross River State	22,112	State of Nigeria.
Kepulauan Riau	21,992	Province of Indonesia.
Northeastern Region (Iceland)	21,968	Region of Iceland.
Sergipe	21,910	State of Brazil.
(Zambia) Lusaka Province	21,898	Smallest province of Zambia; split from Central Province in 1973, Lusaka province was initially only 360 km^{2}, but by 1988 it had been enlarged to its present size.
Lviv Oblast	21,831	Oblast of Ukraine.
Ivanovo Oblast	21,800	Federal subject of Russia.
(Laos) Savannakhet	21,774	Largest province of Laos.
(Iran) Zanjan Province	21,773	Province of Iran.
Västernorrland County	21,678	County of Sweden.
(Orellana Province) Orellana	21,691	Third largest province of Ecuador.
Norte de Santander Department	21,658	District of Colombia.
Vojvodina	21,506	Province of Serbia.
México	21,355	State of Mexico.
Ica Region	21,328	Region of Peru.
(Gabon) Nyanga Province	21,285	Third smallest province of Gabon.
Tierra del Fuego	21,263	Province of Argentina. Not including claims on the Malvinas (Falkland Islands), South Georgia and South Sandwich Islands, nor Argentine Antarctica.
Bengkulu	21,168	Province of Indonesia.
(Afghanistan) Baghlan Province	21,118	Province of Afghanistan.
Hesse (Hessen)	21,115	State of Germany.
Mizoram	21,081	State of India.
El Salvador	21,041	Country in Central America.
Perak	21,006	State of Malaysia.
(Ivory Coast) Denguélé District	20,997	District of Côte d'Ivoire.
(Algeria) Biskra Province	20,986	Province of Algeria.
(Republic of the Congo) Lékoumou	20,950	Department of the Republic of the Congo.
Guayas Province	20,902	Province of Ecuador.
Cherkasy Oblast	20,900	Oblast of Ukraine.
(Peru) Apurímac Region	20,896	Region of Peru.
(La Guajira Department) Guajira Department	20,848	District of Colombia.
Hidalgo	20,813	State of Mexico.
(Uzbekistan) Surxondaryo Region	20,800	Region of Uzbekistan.
Wales	20,779	Second smallest constituent country of the United Kingdom.
Israel (excluding disputed territory)	20,770	Country in Middle East. Excluding the Golan Heights, the West Bank and Gaza Strip.
(Gabon) Estuaire Province	20,740	Second smallest province of Gabon.
(Algeria) Tiaret Province	20,673	Province of Algeria.
Khmelnytskyi Oblast	20,645	Oblast of Ukraine.
(Turkey) Antalya Province	20,591	Province of Turkey.
(Afghanistan) Badghis Province	20,591	Province of Afghanistan.
Halaib Triangle	20,580	Disputed area between Egypt and Sudan.
(Ghana) Volta Region	20,572	Region of Ghana.
(Uzbekistan) Jizzax Region	20,500	Region of Uzbekistan.
(Benin) Atakora Department	20,499	Department of Benin.
(Nakhon Ratchasima province) Nakhon Ratchasima Province	20,494	Largest province of Thailand.
Saxony-Anhalt (Sachsen-Anhalt)	20,445	State of Germany.
(Nigeria) Kano State	20,389	State of Nigeria.
West New Britain Province	20,387	Province of Papua New Guinea.
(Afghanistan) Faryab Province	20,293	Province of Afghanistan.
Slovenia	20,273	Country in Europe.
(Cameroon) Littoral Province	20,239	Third smallest province of Cameroon.
(Iran) Golestan Province	20,195	Province of Iran.
Podlaskie Voivodeship (Podlaskie)	20,171	Voivodeship of Poland.
Volyn Oblast	20,144	Oblast of Ukraine.
(Iran) Ilam Province	20,133	Province of Iran.
(Chanthaburi province) Chanthaburi Province	20,107	Second largest province of Thailand.
Rivne Oblast	20,047	Oblast of Ukraine.
(San Pedro Department, Paraguay) San Pedro Department	20,002	Department of Paraguay.
(Brazil) Bananal Island	20,000	Island part of Brazil, world's second-largest fluvial island.

== See also ==
Other divisions

- 0.1 to 1,000,000+ square kilometers
- 1,000,000+ square kilometers

Smaller divisions

- 200,000+ square kilometers • 100,000 to 1,000,000 square kilometers • 50,000 to 200,000 square kilometers • 20,000 to 50,000 square kilometers
- 5,000 to 20,000 square kilometers • 1,000 to 5,000 square kilometers • 0.1 to 1,000 square kilometers
- 500,000 to 1,000,000 square kilometers • 200,000 to 500,000 square kilometers • 100,000 to 200,000 square kilometers
- 50,000 to 100,000 square kilometers • 30,000 to 50,000 square kilometers • 20,000 to 30,000 square kilometers • 10,000 to 20,000 square kilometers
- 7,000 to 10,000 square kilometers • 5,000 to 7,000 square kilometers • 3,000 to 5,000 square kilometers • 1,000 to 3,000 square kilometers
- 250 to 1,000 square kilometers • 50 to 250 square kilometers • Under 50 square kilometers

Other

- List of countries and dependencies by area
- List of largest empires
- List of administrative divisions by country
- Category:Ranked lists of country subdivisions
