= Errard =

Errard is a surname. Notable people with the surname include:

- Anouck Errard (born 1999), French freestyle skier
- Charles Errard (1606–1689), French painter, architect and engraver
- François Errard (born 1967), French tennis player

== See also ==
- Erhard
- Sault Falls, also known as Errard Falls
