= Taiwan (disambiguation) =

Taiwan, officially the Republic of China, is a country in East Asia.

Taiwan or Tai Wan may also refer to:

== Places ==
=== Taiwan ===
- Taiwan (island), the main island of Taiwan, known alternately as Formosa
- Taiwan Area, territories under the control of the Republic of China
- Taiwan Province (disambiguation), a nominal administrative division covering much of Taiwan and the Penghu Islands
- Taiwan Prefecture, a prefecture of Taiwan during the Qing dynasty
  - "Taiwan", an old name for the city of Tainan (the former capital of the island) before the establishment of Tainan Prefecture
- "Taiwan, China", a political propaganda term used by China's Communist government to claim Taiwan as part of its territory

=== Hong Kong ===
- Tai Wan, Hung Hom, an area of Hong Kong and a former bay
  - Tai Wan Road
- Tai Wan (大灣; 'Big Bay'), a beach at Tai Long Wan (Sai Kung District), Hong Kong
- Tai Wan (大灣; 'Big Bay'), a bay and village on the island of Po Toi
- Tai Wan Village, Lamma Island, a village on Lamma Island, Hong Kong
- Tai Wan Village, Sai Kung District, a village in Sai Kung District, Hong Kong

=== Novosibirsk Oblast ===
- Taiwan (Novosibirsk Reservoir), the an uninhabited island in the Novosibirsk Reservoir

== People ==
- Taiwan Jones (born 1988), American football running back
- Taiwan Jones (linebacker) (born 1993), American football linebacker

== Other uses ==
- 2169 Taiwan, an asteroid

== See also ==
- Taiwanfu (disambiguation)
- Formosa (disambiguation)
- Republic of China (disambiguation)
- ROC (disambiguation)
- China (disambiguation)
- Taiwan Province (disambiguation)
- Taiwania (disambiguation)
- Taiwaniana (disambiguation)
- Taiwanica (disambiguation)
- Formosum (disambiguation)
