= List of political and geographic subdivisions by total area from 50 to 250 square kilometers =

This is one of a series of comprehensive lists of continents, countries, and first level administrative country subdivisions such as states, provinces, and territories, as well as certain political and geographic features of substantial area. References for the information provided in this table may be found in the individual articles on each body listed herein. Some divisions are listed twice, with one listing including territory that is excluded in the other for various reasons, including territorial disputes. There is intentional overlap among the lists in order to maximize ease of use.

Geographic entity	Area (km^{2})	Notes
Penal–Debe	246.91	Regional corporation of Trinidad and Tobago.
Bridgend	246	Unitary authority of Wales.
Municipality of Ajdovščina	245.2	Municipality of Slovenia.
Val-de-Marne	245	Department of France.
Redcar and Cleveland	245	Unitary authority of England.
Appenzell Ausserrhoden	243	Canton of Switzerland.
Peter I Island	243	Norwegian claim to Antarctica.
Esch-sur-Alzette	242.77	Canton of Luxembourg.
Saint Pierre and Miquelon	242	French overseas collectivity in the North Atlantic Ocean. Includes eight small islands in the Saint Pierre and the Miquelon-Langlade groups.
Cerknica	241	Municipality of Slovenia.
National Capital District	240	Capital city of Papua New Guinea; city with provincial status.
(North Macedonia) Rankovce	240	Municipality of North Macedonia.
Canton of Zug	239	Third smallest canton of Switzerland.
(Palestine) Tulkarm	239	Governorate of Palestine.
Luxembourg	238.46	Canton of Luxembourg.
Camiguin	237.95	Second smallest province of the Philippines.
Cook Islands	236	Country in Oceania. Self-governing in free association with New Zealand.
Seine-Saint-Denis	236	Third smallest department of France.
(Montenegro) Tuzi	236	Municipality of Montenegro.
(Montenegro) Herceg Novi	235	Municipality of Montenegro.
(North Macedonia) Konče	233	Municipality of North Macedonia.
(North Macedonia) Karbinci	231	Municipality of North Macedonia.
(North Macedonia) Vasilevo	231	Municipality of North Macedonia.
(North Macedonia) Saraj	230	Municipality of North Macedonia.
Zanzibar Urban/West Region	230	Smallest region of Tanzania.
Swindon	230	Unitary authority of England.
Lembá	229	Second largest district of São Tomé and Príncipe.
București (Bucharest)	228	Municipality of Romania. Bucharest is the smallest first level subdivision of Romania, and the only non-county subdivision.
Yerevan	227	City with provincial status in Armenia. Yerevan is the smallest first level subdivision of Armenia.
Ivančna Gorica	227	Municipality of Slovenia.
(Timor-Leste) Dili Municipality	224	Municipality of East Timor.
Mersch	223.90	Canton of Luxembourg.
Pivka	223.3	Municipality of Slovenia.
(North Macedonia) Sopište	223	Municipality of North Macedonia.
South Dublin	223	Administrative county within the province of Leinster, in the Republic of Ireland.
Šentjur	222.3	Municipality of Slovenia.
(North Macedonia) Petrovec	222	Municipality of North Macedonia.
Litija	221	Municipality of Slovenia.
San Juan–Laventille	220.39	Second smallest regional corporation of Trinidad and Tobago.
Batanes	219.01	Smallest province of the Philippines.
(Northern Cyprus) Güzelyurt	219	District of Northern Cyprus, which is internationally recognized as a part of Cyprus.
Sežana	217.4	Municipality of Slovenia.
(North Macedonia) Čučer-Sandevo	215	Municipality of North Macedonia.
Cairo Governorate	214	Governorate of Egypt.
Province of Trieste	212	Smallest province of Italy.
Grevenmacher	211.37	Canton of Luxembourg.
(North Macedonia) Pehčevo	208	Municipality of North Macedonia.
Diekirch	204.51	Canton of Luxembourg.
(Kuwait) Farwaniya	204	Governorate of Kuwait.
Stockton-on-Tees	204	Unitary authority of England.
City of Buenos Aires	203	Federal district of Argentina.
Doha	202.7	Smallest municipality of Qatar.
West Region	201.3	Largest region of Singapore.
(North Macedonia) Želino	201	Municipality of North Macedonia.
Djibouti Region	200	Smallest region of Djibouti.
Wallis and Futuna	200	French overseas collectivity. Includes Île Uvéa (Wallis Island), Île Futuna (Futuna Island), Île Alofi, and 20 islets.
Capellen	199.21	Canton of Luxembourg.
American Samoa	199	Unorganized, unincorporated territory of the US in Oceania. Includes Rose Atoll and Swains Island.
Wigan	199	Metropolitan borough of England.
Channel Islands	198	Archipelago in the English Channel, consists of the British Crown dependencies of Guernsey and Jersey.
Windsor and Maidenhead	198	Unitary authority of England.
Laško	197.5	Municipality of Slovenia.
Darlington	197	Unitary authority of England.
Trebnje	195	Municipality of Slovenia.
Aruba	193	Country in South America; self-governing part of the Kingdom of the Netherlands.
Kobarid	192.7	Municipality of Slovenia.
Hrpelje-Kozina	192.2	Municipality of Slovenia.
Medway	192	Unitary authority of England.
North East Lincolnshire	192	Unitary authority of England.
Newport	191	Unitary authority (city) of Wales.
Narva Reservoir	191	Reservoir in Europe between Estonia and Russia.
(Palestine) Salfit	191	Governorate of Palestine.
(North Macedonia) Kruševo	190	Municipality of North Macedonia.
(North Macedonia) Makedonska Kamenica	189	Municipality of North Macedonia.
Cork City	187	Local Authority in the Republic of Ireland.
Aberdeen City council area	186	Unitary district (city) of Scotland.
Echternach	185.54	Third smallest canton of Luxembourg.
Tristan da Cunha	184	Largest administrative area (Island Council) of Saint Helena, Ascension and Tristan da Cunha.
Osh	183	Second smallest province of Kyrgyzstan.
Islands	182.74	District in Hong Kong.
Marshall Islands	181	Country in Oceania. Includes the atolls of Bikini, Enewetak, Kwajalein, Majuro, Rongelap, and Utirik.
Saint Andrew Parish	179.9	Largest parish of Dominica.
Solihull	179	Metropolitan borough of England.
Wokingham	179	Unitary authority of England.
(Timor-Leste) Dili	178.62	Capital and largest city of East Timor.
(Washington, D.C.) Washington, District of Columbia	177	Capital District of the United States.
(North Macedonia) Zelenikovo	177	Municipality of North Macedonia.
Hauts-de-Seine	176	Second smallest department of France.
Warrington	176	Unitary authority of England.
(Kuwait) Asimah	175	Governorate of Kuwait.
Glasgow City council area	175	Unitary district (city) of Scotland.
Northern Governorate	175	Governorate of Bahrain.
(North Macedonia) Jegunovce	174	Municipality of North Macedonia.
Slovenj Gradec	173.7	Municipality of Slovenia.
Logatec	173.1	Municipality of Slovenia.
Appenzell Innerrhoden	173	Second smallest canton of Switzerland.
East Renfrewshire	173	Unitary district of Scotland.
(Montenegro) Petnjica	173	Municipality of Montenegro.
East Dunbartonshire	172	Unitary district of Scotland.
Tel Aviv	170	Smallest District of Israel.
Bishkek	170	Smallest province of Kyrgyzstan.
Saint Kitts	168	Larger of the two main islands of Saint Kitts and Nevis.
Loška Dolina	166.8	Municipality of Slovenia.
Quezon City	166.2	Largest city in the Philippines.
(North Macedonia) Lozovo	166	Municipality of North Macedonia.
Žužemberk	164.3	Municipality of Slovenia.
Železniki	164	Municipality of Slovenia.
(North Macedonia) Brvenica	164	Municipality of North Macedonia.
Thurrock	164	Unitary authority of England.
(Palestine) Qalqilya	164	Governorate of Palestine.
Easter Island	163.6	Special territory of Chile.
Providenciales and West Caicos	163.6	Largest administrative district of the Turks and Caicos Islands.
(Northern Cyprus) Lefke	162	District of Northern Cyprus, which is internationally recognized as a part of Cyprus.
West Dunbartonshire	162	Tie for third smallest unitary district of Scotland.
Inverclyde	162	Tie for third smallest unitary district of Scotland.
Brussels-Capital Region	161	Region of Belgium.
Barbuda	160.58	Dependency of Antigua and Barbuda.
Rochdale	160	Metropolitan borough of England.
Liechtenstein	160	Smallest doubly landlocked country of the world.
Wirral	159	Metropolitan borough of England.
Clackmannanshire	157	Second smallest unitary district of Scotland.
(Montenegro) Gusinje	157	Municipality of Montenegro.
(North Macedonia) Vrapčište	157	Municipality of North Macedonia.
Črna na Koroškem	156	Municipality of Slovenia.
Tržič	155.4	Municipality of Slovenia.
Northern Islands Municipality	154.76	Largest municipality of the Northern Mariana Islands.
Ribnica	153.6	Municipality of Slovenia.
Gorenja Vas-Poljane	153.3	Municipality of Slovenia.
Sefton	153	Metropolitan borough of England.
(Montenegro) Zeta	153	Municipality of Montenegro.
Newtownabbey	151	District of Northern Ireland.
Kranj	151	Municipality of Slovenia.
British Virgin Islands	151	British Overseas Territory; comprises 16 inhabited and more than 20 uninhabited islands. Includes the island of Anegada.
Calamba	149.5	1st class city in the province of Laguna, Philippines.
Charlotte Parish	149	Largest parish of Saint Vincent and the Grenadines.
Tai Po	148.19	District in Hong Kong.
Austral Islands	148	Smallest administrative subdivision of French Polynesia.
Maribor	148	Municipality of Slovenia.
Divača	147.8	Municipality of Slovenia.
Zagorje ob Savi	147.1	Municipality of Slovenia.
Callao Region	147	Smallest region of Peru.
Semič	146.7	Municipality of Slovenia.
Kanal ob Soči	146.5	Municipality of Slovenia.
Bajo Nuevo Bank	145	Disputed island in the Caribbean claimed by the United States, Nicaragua and Jamaica, and administered by Colombia.
Škofja Loka	145	Municipality of Slovenia.
Nukufetau (total area)	145	Atoll of Tuvalu.
North Caicos	144.9	Second largest administrative district of the Turks and Caicos Islands.
Moravske Toplice	144.5	Municipality of Slovenia.
Middle Caicos	144.2	Administrative district of the Turks and Caicos Islands.
Chandigarh	144	Union Territory of India.
(North Macedonia) Bosilovo	143	Municipality of North Macedonia.
Gateshead	143	Metropolitan borough of England.
Príncipe Province	142	Third biggest district of São Tomé and Príncipe.
Ormož	141.6	Municipality of Slovenia.
(North Macedonia) Bogovinje	141	Municipality of North Macedonia.
Oldham	141	Metropolitan borough of England.
(Timor-Leste) Atauro	140.5	Municipality of East Timor.
Bolton	140	Metropolitan borough of England.
Cardiff	139	Unitary authority (city) of Wales.
Yuen Long	138.56	District in Hong Kong.
North-East Region	138.1	Second largest region of Singapore.
Sunderland	138	Metropolitan borough (city) of England.
Blackburn with Darwen	137	Unitary authority of England.
(North Macedonia) Tearce	137	Municipality of North Macedonia.
South Caicos and East Caicos	136.8	Administrative district of the Turks and Caicos Islands.
North	136.51	District in Hong Kong
Sai Kung	136.34	District in Hong Kong.
North Region	134.5	Region of Singapore.
Municipality of Loški Potok	134	Municipality of Slovenia.
Grosuplje	133.8	Municipality of Slovenia.
(North Macedonia) Češinovo-Obleševo	133	Municipality of North Macedonia.
(North Macedonia) Rosoman	133	Municipality of North Macedonia.
Saint Helens	133	Metropolitan borough of England.
Central Region	132.7	Second smallest region of Singapore.
Sinuiju	132	A planned special administrative region of North Korea.
Cerkno	131.6	Municipality of Slovenia.
Belfast	130	District of Northern Ireland.
(North Macedonia) Dojran	129	Municipality of North Macedonia.
Remich	127.87	Second smallest canton of Luxembourg.
Diego Martin region	127.53	Smallest regional corporation of Trinidad and Tobago.
Chuuk	127	State of the Federated States of Micronesia.
Torfaen	126	Third smallest unitary authority of Wales.
Stockport	126	Metropolitan borough of England.
Dún Laoghaire–Rathdown	125.8	Administrative county within the province of Leinster, in the Republic of Ireland.
Saint David Parish	125.8	Second largest parish of Dominica.
(Montenegro) Budva	122	Municipality of Montenegro.
Daman and Diu	122	Union Territory of India.
Saint Helena	122	Administrative area (Legislative Council) of Saint Helena, Ascension and Tristan da Cunha.
Lendava	121	Municipality of Slovenia.
Mé-Zóchi	121	District of São Tomé and Príncipe.
Canillo	121	Largest parish of Andorra.
Cantagalo	119	Third smallest district of São Tomé and Príncipe.
Radovljica	118.7	Municipality of Slovenia.
Saint Joseph Parish	118.4	Third largest parish of Dominica.
Damascus	118	Smallest governorate of Syria.
Yap	118	State of the Federated States of Micronesia.
Dublin City	117.8	Local Authority in the Republic of Ireland.
Dobrova-Polhov Gradec	117.5	Municipality of Slovenia.
Žalec	117.1	Municipality of Slovenia.
Asunción Department	117	Smallest department of Paraguay.
Manchester	116	Metropolitan borough (city) of England.
Jersey	116	Crown dependency of the UK.
Gorje	116	Municipality of Slovenia.
Vrhnika	116	Municipality of Slovenia.
Saipan Municipality	115.38	Second largest municipality of the Northern Mariana Islands.
(North Macedonia) Bogdanci	114	Municipality of North Macedonia.
Liverpool	113	Metropolitan borough (city) of England.
Northern Region	112.9	Region of Malta.
Mislinja	112.2	Municipality of Slovenia.
Newcastle upon Tyne	112	Metropolitan borough (city) of England.
Merthyr Tydfil	111	Second smallest unitary authority of Wales.
Dolenjske Toplice	110.2	Municipality of Slovenia.
East Region	110	Smallest region of Singapore.
Bristol	110	Unitary authority (city) of England.
Kosrae	110	Smallest state of the Federated States of Micronesia.
Luče	109.5	Municipality of Slovenia.
Blaenau Gwent	109	Smallest unitary authority of Wales.
Bracknell Forest	109	Unitary authority of England.
Metlika	108.9	Municipality of Slovenia.
Tinian Municipality	108.11	Second smallest municipality of the Northern Mariana Islands.
(Palestine) Khan Yunis	108	Governorate of Palestine.
Puconci	108	Municipality of Slovenia.
Šmarje pri Jelšah	107.7	Municipality of Slovenia.
Vipava	107.4	Municipality of Slovenia.
Ljutomer	107.2	Municipality of Slovenia.
(North Macedonia) Centar Župa	107	Municipality of North Macedonia.
Walsall	106	Metropolitan borough of England.
Trafford	106	Metropolitan borough of England.
Paris	105	Smallest department of France.
Lobata	105	Second smallest district of São Tomé and Príncipe.
Dravograd	105	Municipality of Slovenia.
Distrito Nacional	104.4	Nacional District of the Dominican Republic.
(Kuwait) Mubarak Al-Kabeer	104	Governorate of Kuwait.
Podvelka	103.9	Municipality of Slovenia.
Velike Lašče	103.2	Municipality of Slovenia.
Tameside	103	Metropolitan borough of England.
Solčava	102.8	Municipality of Slovenia.
Komen	102.7	Municipality of Slovenia.
Montserrat	102	British Overseas Territory.
Gros Islet	101	Largest district of Saint Lucia.
Brazzaville	100	Second smallest department of the Republic of the Congo.
Jūrmala	100	Second largest city of Latvia with separate status (not part of any district).
Bury	99	Metropolitan borough of England.
Saint Andrew Parish	99	Largest parish of Grenada.
Ig	98.8	Municipality of Slovenia.
Dudley	98	Metropolitan borough of England.
Slovenske Konjice	97.8	Municipality of Slovenia.
Salford	97	Metropolitan borough (city) of England.
Knowsley	97	Metropolitan borough of England.
(North Macedonia) Ilinden	97	Municipality of North Macedonia.
Coventry	97	Metropolitan borough (city) of England.
Šentjernej	96	Municipality of Slovenia.
Šoštanj	95.6	Municipality of Slovenia.
Bender, Moldova (Tighina)	95	District-level municipality of Moldova.
Celje	94.9	Municipality of Slovenia.
Dobrepolje	94.9	Municipality of Slovenia.
Šmartno pri Litiji	94.9	Municipality of Slovenia.
Hartlepool	94	Unitary authority of England.
Radlje ob Dravi	93.9	Municipality of Slovenia.
Nevis	93	Smaller of the two main islands of Saint Kitts and Nevis.
Stoke-on-Trent	93	Unitary authority (city) of England.
(North Macedonia) Gazi Baba	92	Municipality of North Macedonia.
Brezovica	91.2	Municipality of Slovenia.
Anguilla	91	British Overseas Territory.
Castries	90.33	Second largest district of Saint Lucia.
Gornji Grad	90.1	Municipality of Slovenia.
Kozje	89.7	Municipality of Slovenia.
Ordino	89	Second largest parish of Andorra.
Preddvor	88.7	Municipality of Slovenia.
Saint Martin	88.4	Island in the Caribbean divided between Saint Martin, the French side, and Sint Maarten, the Dutch side.
(North Macedonia) Krivogaštani	88	Municipality of North Macedonia.
Ascension Island	88	Smallest administrative area (Island Council) of Saint Helena, Ascension and Tristan da Cunha.
Banjul	88	Capital city of The Gambia.
Tuen Mun	87.54	District in Hong Kong
Bujumbura Mairie	87	Smallest province of Burundi.
Manhattan	87	One of the five boroughs of New York City, New York, USA.
Saint Patrick Parish	86.7	Parish of Dominica.
Grenadines	86	Chain of islands in the Caribbean between Saint Vincent and Grenada.
Sandwell	86	Metropolitan borough of England.
Rota Municipality	85.39	Smallest municipality of the Northern Mariana Islands.
Carrickfergus	85	Third smallest district of Northern Ireland.
(North Macedonia) Debar	85	Municipality of North Macedonia.
(Kuwait) Hawalli	85	Governorate of Kuwait.
Lovrenc na Pohorju	84.4	Municipality of Slovenia.
Castlereagh	84	Second smallest district of Northern Ireland.
North Tyneside	84	Metropolitan borough of England.
Velenje	83.5	Municipality of Slovenia.
Brighton and Hove	82	Unitary authority of England.
Videm	80.2	Municipality of Slovenia.
Plymouth	80	Unitary authority (city) of England.
Saint David Parish	80	Second largest parish of Saint Vincent and the Grenadines.
Littoral Department	79	Smallest department of Benin.
Southern Region	78.9	Region of Malta.
Ljubno	78.9	Municipality of Slovenia.
Vianden	78.59	Smallest canton of Luxembourg.
Bălți	78	District-level municipality of Moldova.
Derby	78	Unitary authority (city) of England.
Guernsey	78	Crown dependency of the UK. Includes Alderney, Guernsey, Herm, Sark, and some other smaller islands.
Micoud	78	Third largest district of Saint Lucia.
Cerklje na Gorenjskem	78	Municipality of Slovenia.
Medvode	77.6	Municipality of Slovenia.
Bissau	77.5	Capital and autonomous sector of Guinea-Bissau.
Uvea	77.5	Largest chiefdom of Wallis and Futuna.
Jesenice	75.8	Municipality of Slovenia.
Pesnica	75.8	Municipality of Slovenia.
Vojnik	75.3	Municipality of Slovenia.
Bloke	75.1	Municipality of Slovenia.
Gornja Radgona	75	Municipality of Slovenia.
Nottingham	75	Unitary authority (city) of England.
Lukovica	74.9	Municipality of Slovenia.
Western District, American Samoa	74.781	District of American Samoa.
Halton	74	Unitary authority of England.
Encamp	74	Third largest parish of Andorra.
Leicester	73	Unitary authority (city) of England.
Majšperk	72.8	Municipality of Slovenia.
Domžale	72.3	Municipality of Slovenia.
Daugavpils	72	Third largest city of Latvia with separate status (not part of any district).
Bled	72	Municipality of Slovenia.
North Down	72	Smallest district of Northern Ireland.
Brda	72	Municipality of Slovenia.
Port Said Governorate	72	Second smallest governorate of Egypt.
Kidričevo	71.5	Municipality of Slovenia.
Rogaška Slatina	71.5	Municipality of Slovenia.
Šalovci	71.5	Municipality of Slovenia.
Kingston upon Hull	71	Unitary authority (city) of England.
Mokronog-Trebelno	71	Municipality of Slovenia.
Dennery	70	District of Saint Lucia.
(Palestine) Gaza	70	Governorate of Palestine.
Kentucky Bend	69.6	Exclave of Kentucky cut off by the Mississippi River, surrounded by Missouri and Tennessee.
Sha Tin	69.27	District in Hong Kong
Wolverhampton	69	Metropolitan borough (city) of England.
Jezersko	68.8	Municipality of Slovenia.
Gozo	68.7	Region of Malta.
Capital Governorate	68	Governorate of Bahrain.
(Australia) Jervis Bay Territory	67.8	Internal territory of Australia
Eastern District, American Samoa	67.027	District of American Samoa.
Bangui	67	Commune of the Central African Republic.
Kowloon	67	One of the three areas of Hong Kong.
Ptuj	67	Municipality of Slovenia.
Zreče	67	Municipality of Slovenia.
Saint John Parish	66.96	Largest parish of Antigua and Barbuda.
Gornji Petrovci	66.8	Municipality of Slovenia.
Saint Paul Parish	66.4	Parish of Dominica.
Šentilj	65.01	Municipality of Slovenia.
Ngeremlengui	65	Largest state of Palau.
Dundee City council area	65	Smallest unitary district (city) of Scotland.
Vitanje	65	Municipality of Slovenia.
Poole	65	Unitary authority of England.
(Palestine) Rafah	65	Governorate of Palestine.
Saint George Parish	65	Second largest parish of Grenada.
Selnica ob Dravi	64.5	Municipality of Slovenia.
Murska Sobota	64.4	Municipality of Slovenia.
South Tyneside	64	Metropolitan borough of England.
Saint Mary Parish	63.55	Second largest parish of Antigua and Barbuda.
Ravne na Koroškem	63.4	Municipality of Slovenia.
(North Macedonia) Gjorče Petrov	63	Municipality of North Macedonia.
Torbay	63	Unitary authority of England.
Miren-Kostanjevica	62.8	Municipality of Slovenia.
Tsuen Wan	62.62	District in Hong Kong
Beltinci	62.2	Municipality of Slovenia.
Lenart	62	Municipality of Slovenia.
Pitcairn Islands	62	British Overseas Territory in Oceania composed of several islands including Pitcairn Island.
Moravče	61.4	Municipality of Slovenia.
Gorišnica	61.2	Municipality of Slovenia.
(North Macedonia) Butel	61	Municipality of North Macedonia.
(Palestine) North Gaza	61	Governorate of Palestine.
San Marino	61	Country in Europe.
Amsterdam Island/Saint Paul Island	61	Second smallest district of the French Southern and Antarctic Lands.
La Massana	61	Parish of Andorra.
Ruše	60.8	Municipality of Slovenia.
Podčetrtek	60.6	Municipality of Slovenia.
Koror	60.52	Second largest state of Palau.
Škocjan	60.4	Municipality of Slovenia.
Jelgava	60	City of Latvia with separate status (not part of any district).
Liepāja	60	Third smallest city of Latvia with separate status (not part of any district).
Sant Julià de Lòria	60	Parish of Andorra.
Saint Philip	60	Largest parish of Barbados.
Chaguanas	59.65	Largest municipality of Trinidad and Tobago.
Ribnica na Pohorju	59.3	Municipality of Slovenia.
Saint John Parish	59.1	Parish of Dominica.
Manhattan	59	Smallest borough of New York City.
Hrastnik	58.6	Municipality of Slovenia.
Prevalje	58.1	Municipality of Slovenia.
Kostanjevica na Krki	58	Municipality of Slovenia.
Trbovlje	57.8	Municipality of Slovenia.
Galway City	57.3	Local Authority in the Republic of Ireland.
Muharraq Governorate	57	Smallest governorate of Bahrain.
Christ Church	57	Second largest parish of Barbados.
Manu'a	56.688	District of American Samoa.
Saint George Parish	56.2	Parish of Dominica.
Kostel	56.09	Municipality of Slovenia.
(Palestine) Deir al-Balah	56	Governorate of Palestine.
Tortola	55.7	Largest district of the British Virgin Islands.
Braslovče	55	Municipality of Slovenia.
Luxor Governorate	55	Smallest governorate of Egypt.
Middlesbrough	54	Unitary authority of England.
(North Macedonia) Plasnica	54	Municipality of North Macedonia.
Hoče-Slivnica	53.7	Municipality of Slovenia.
Apače	53.5	Municipality of Slovenia.
Mozirje	53.5	Municipality of Slovenia.
Vransko	53.3	Municipality of Slovenia.
Bermuda	53	Overseas territory of the UK in North America.
Ngardmau	53	Third largest state of Palau.
San Andrés and Providencia Department	52	Smallest department of Colombia.
Saint George Parish	52	Parish of Saint Vincent and the Grenadines.
Radeče	52	Municipality of Slovenia.
Aimeliik	52	State of Palau.
(North Macedonia) Zrnovci	52	Municipality of North Macedonia.
Sveti Jurij ob Ščavnici	51.3	Municipality of Slovenia.
Rače-Fram	51.2	Municipality of Slovenia.
Soufrière	50.51	District of Saint Lucia.
Vuzenica	50.1	Municipality of Slovenia.
Pointe-Noire	50	Smallest department of the Republic of the Congo.
Southampton	50	Unitary authority (city) of England.

== See also ==
Other divisions

- 0.1 to 1,000,000+ square kilometers
- 1,000,000+ square kilometers

Smaller divisions

- 200,000+ square kilometers • 100,000 to 1,000,000 square kilometers • 50,000 to 200,000 square kilometers • 20,000 to 50,000 square kilometers
- 5,000 to 20,000 square kilometers • 1,000 to 5,000 square kilometers • 0.1 to 1,000 square kilometers
- 500,000 to 1,000,000 square kilometers • 200,000 to 500,000 square kilometers • 100,000 to 200,000 square kilometers
- 50,000 to 100,000 square kilometers • 30,000 to 50,000 square kilometers • 20,000 to 30,000 square kilometers • 10,000 to 20,000 square kilometers
- 7,000 to 10,000 square kilometers • 5,000 to 7,000 square kilometers • 3,000 to 5,000 square kilometers • 1,000 to 3,000 square kilometers
- 250 to 1,000 square kilometers • 50 to 250 square kilometers • Under 50 square kilometers

Other

- List of countries and dependencies by area
- List of largest empires
- List of administrative divisions by country
- Category:Ranked lists of country subdivisions
