= List of political and geographic subdivisions by total area from 250 to 1,000 square kilometers =

This is one of a series of comprehensive lists of continents, countries, and first level administrative country subdivisions such as states, provinces, and territories, as well as certain political and geographic features of substantial area. References for the information provided in this table may be found in the individual articles on each body listed herein. Some divisions are listed twice, with one listing including territory that is excluded in the other for various reasons, including territorial disputes. There is intentional overlap among the lists in order to maximize ease of use.

Geographic entity	Area (km^{2})	Notes
(Netherlands) Dutch Caribbean	999	Dutch islands in the Caribbean. These include the constituent countries of the Kingdom of the Netherlands--Aruba, Curaçao and Sint Maarten, and the three special municipalities of Bonaire, Saba and Sint Eustatius.
(North Macedonia) Kavadarci	998	Municipality of North Macedonia.
Ștefan Vodă District	998	District of Moldova.
(Northern Cyprus) Gazimağusa	997	District of Northern Cyprus, which is internationally recognized as a part of Cyprus.
Thurgau	991	Canton of Switzerland.
(Bhutan) Punaka	977	Third smallest district of Bhutan.
(Scotland) Mainland (Shetland)	968.87	Largest island of Shetland, part of Scotland.
(Thailand) Ang Thong Province	968	Province of Thailand.
(South Korea) Incheon	965	Second largest metropolitan city of South Korea.
(Tuscany) Pistoia Province	964.12	Province of Italy.
São Tomé and Príncipe	964	Country in Africa.
Rîșcani District	936	District of Moldova.
(Philippines) Marinduque	952.58	Province of the Philippines.
New Territories	952	Biggest one of the three areas of Hong Kong.
Turks and Caicos Islands	948	British Overseas Territory in the West Indies. Area includes protected waters.
(Jordan) Madaba	940	Governorate of Jordan.
Edineț District	933	District of Moldova.
(Montenegro) Bijelo Polje	924	Municipality of Montenegro.
(Vietnam) Hưng Yên Province	923.5	Province of Vietnam.
Cimișlia District	923	District of Moldova.
County Dublin	922	County in the Leinster province of the Republic of Ireland.
(Vietnam) Hanoi (municipality)	921.8	Third smallest province of Vietnam.
(Province of Rimini) Rimini Province	921.77	Province of Italy.
(New Zealand) Chatham Island	920	Largest island of the Chatham Islands, part of New Zealand.
(Piedmont) Biella Province	913	Province of Italy.
Canton of Schwyz	908	Canton of Switzerland.
(Pakistan) Islamabad Capital Territory	906	Smallest province of Pakistan.
Luxembourg	904	District of Luxembourg.
(Montenegro) Cetinje	899	Municipality of Montenegro.
Kathmandu	899	Capital and largest city of Nepal.
(Trinidad and Tobago) Sangre Grande region	898.94	Largest region of Trinidad and Tobago.
County Carlow	897	County in the Leinster province of the Republic of Ireland.
(Montenegro) Kolašin	897	Municipality of Montenegro.
(Solomon Islands) Temotu Province	895	Third smallest province of the Solomon Islands.
Anenii Noi District	892	District of Moldova.
Berlin	892	City-state of Germany.
(South Korea) Daegu	886	Third largest metropolitan city of South Korea.
(El Salvador) San Salvador	886	Second smallest department of El Salvador.
(United Kingdom) Newry and Mourne	886	Third largest district of Northern Ireland.
(Scotland) North Ayrshire	884	Unitary district of Scotland.
(Vanuatu) Torba Province	882	Smallest province of Vanuatu.
(Province of La Spezia) La Spezia Province	881	Province of Italy.
(French Polynesia) Tuamotu-Gambier Islands	881	Administrative subdivision of French Polynesia.
Virgin Islands	877.6	Archipelago of islands in the Greater Antilles, consists of the Spanish Virgin Islands, British Virgin Islands and the United States Virgin Islands.
Chesapeake	876.74	Independent City of Virginia.
(North Macedonia) Makedonski Brod	875	Municipality of North Macedonia.
(Jamaica) Trelawny Parish	874.6	Parish of Jamaica.
(Transnistria) Slobozia	873.24	District of Transnistria, a breakaway republic recognized as a part of Moldova.
(Thailand) Samut Sakhon Province	872	Province of Thailand.
(Zimbabwe) Harare	872	Independent city of Zimbabwe.
Cantemir District	870	District of Moldova.
(Timor-Leste) Ainaro	869.8	Municipality of East Timor.
(Cambodia) City of Sihanoukville	868	Self-governing city of Cambodia.
Sevastopol City	864	Independent city of Ukraine second smallest political subdivision of Ukraine, currently controlled by Russia (Not recognized internationally as a part of Russia).
(Marche) Fermo Province	862	Province of Italy.
(United Kingdom) Strabane	861	District of Northern Ireland.
(Vietnam) Hà Nam Province	859.7	Second smallest province of Vietnam.
(Qatar) Al Shamal	859	Municipality of Qatar.
(São Tomé and Príncipe) São Tomé Province	859	Province of São Tomé and Príncipe.
(North Macedonia) Mavrovo and Rostuša	856	Municipality of North Macedonia.
(Israel) Haifa District	854	Third smallest District of Israel.
(Montenegro) Plužine	854	Municipality of Montenegro.
(Tanzania) Zanzibar Central/South	854	Region of Tanzania.
(Trinidad and Tobago) Rio Claro–Mayaro	852.81	Second largest region of Trinidad and Tobago.
(Wales) Monmouthshire	851	Unitary authority of Wales.
(Transnistria) Rîbnița	850.2	District of Transnistria, a breakaway republic recognized as a part of Moldova.
Telenești District	849	District of Moldova.
(Wales) Denbighshire	844	Unitary authority of Wales.
(Palestine) Ramallah and al-Bireh	844	Governorate of Palestine.
(Burundi) Mwaro Province	840	Third smallest province of Burundi.
(Mongolia) Orkhon Province	840	Smallest aimag of Mongolia.
Kyiv Oblast	839	Independent city of Ukraine; smallest political subdivision of Ukraine.
(Guinea-Bissau) Biombo	838.8	Region of Guinea-Bissau.
Canton of Jura	838	Canton of Switzerland.
(North Macedonia) Kičevo	838	Municipality of North Macedonia.
(England) North Lincolnshire	833	Unitary authority of England.
(Jamaica) Manchester Parish	830.1	Parish of Jamaica.
Southern Peninsula (Iceland)	829	Smallest region of Iceland.
Madeira	828	Autonomous Region of Portugal.
(Albania) Durrës County	827	Second smallest county of Albania.
County Louth	826	County in the Leinster province of the Republic of Ireland. Smallest of Ireland's 32 traditional counties.
(Vietnam) Bắc Ninh Province	823.1	Smallest province of Vietnam.
(Thailand) Sing Buri Province	823	Province of Thailand.
(Transnistria) Grigoriopol	822	District of Transnistria, a breakaway republic recognized as a part of Moldova.
(Brazil) Serraria Island	818	Island part of Brazil.
Briceni District	814	District of Moldova.
(Jamaica) Portland Parish	814	Parish of Jamaica.
Oecusse-Ambeno	813.6	Exclave special administrative region of East Timor.
Perlis	810	Smallest state of Malaysia.
(Algeria) Algiers Province	809	Province of Algeria.
(Jamaica) Westmoreland Parish	807	Parish of Jamaica.
(Lombardy) Lecco Province	805.61	Province of Italy.
Canton of Neuchâtel	803	Canton of Switzerland.
(Cambodia) City of Pailin	803	Self-governing city of Cambodia.
Netherlands Antilles	800	Country in Caribbean. Self-governing part of the Kingdom of the Netherlands. Includes Bonaire, Curaçao, Saba, Sint Eustatius, and Sint Maarten (Dutch part of the island of Saint Martin).
Chatham Islands	793.88	Island group of New Zealand (land area).
Canton of Solothurn	791	Canton of Switzerland.
(North Macedonia) Bitola	790	Municipality of North Macedonia.
Ialoveni District	783	District of Moldova.
(Province of Lodi) Lodi Province	782.99	Province of Italy.
(Emirate of Umm Al Quwain) Umm al-Quwain	777	Second smallest emirate of the United Arab Emirates.
(Equatorial Guinea) Bioko Norte	776	Province of Equatorial Guinea.
(Panama) Kuna de Wargandí	775	Smallest province of Panama.
Leova District	775	District of Moldova.
(Northern Cyprus) İskele	774	District of Northern Cyprus, which is internationally recognized as a part of Cyprus.
(Timor-Leste) Ermera	770.8	Municipality of East Timor.
New Zealand Subantarctic Islands	764.64	The five southernmost groups of the New Zealand outlying islands. Includes the Auckland Islands, Campbell Islands, Bounty Islands, Antipodes Islands and The Snares.
(United Kingdom) Dungannon	763	District of Northern Ireland.
(Malawi) Chiradzulu	761	District of Malawi.
(South Korea) Busan	760	Metropolitan city of South Korea.
(Yemen) 'Adan Governorate	760	Smallest governorate of Yemen.
(Azores) São Miguel Island	759	Largest island of the Azores, part of Portugal.
(El Salvador) Cuscatlán	756	Smallest department of El Salvador.
(Malawi) Mwanza	756	District of Malawi.
Hamburg	755	City-state of Germany.
(North Macedonia) Novaci	755	Municipality of North Macedonia.
Glodeni District	754	District of Moldova.
Călărași District	753	District of Moldova.
(North Korea) Namp'o-si	753	Special city of North Korea.
Dominica	751	Country in the Caribbean.
Tonga	747	Country in Oceania.
(Jamaica) Saint Thomas Parish	742.8	Parish of Jamaica.
Madeira Island	740.7	Largest island of Madeira, part of Portugal.
Free Territory of Trieste	738	Former European nation from 1947-1975.
Republic of Indian Stream	731	Unrecognized, constitutional republic in North America, 1832–1835.
(Rwanda) Kigali	730	Capital city and province-level unit of Rwanda.
Strășeni District	730	District of Moldova.
(Croatia) Međimurje	729	Second smallest county of Croatia.
(North Macedonia) Čaška	727	Municipality of North Macedonia.
Kiribati	726	Country in Oceania. Includes three island groups - Gilbert Islands, Line Islands, Phoenix Islands.
(Trinidad and Tobago) Couva–Tabaquite–Talparo	719.64	Region of Trinidad and Tobago.
(Wales) Anglesey	719	Unitary authority of Wales.
(Albania) Lezhë County	714	Smallest county of Albania.
(Canary Islands) La Palma	708.32	Third-smallest of the main islands of the Canary Islands, part of Spain.
(England) West Berkshire	704	Unitary authority of England.
Federated States of Micronesia	702	Country in Oceania. Includes Pohnpei (Ponape), Chuuk (Truk) Islands, Yap Islands, and Kosrae (Kosaie).
(Burundi) Muramvya Province	696	Second smallest province of Burundi.
Bahrain	694	Country in Middle East.
(Northern Cyprus) Girne	690	District of Northern Cyprus, which is internationally recognized as a part of Cyprus.
Criuleni District	688	District of Moldova.
Canton of Glarus	685	Canton of Switzerland.
(Kenya) Nairobi Province	684	Smallest Province of Kenya.
Singapore	683	Country in Asia. UN figure is as of 2004. Official area in 2006 is 704 km^{2}.
(Egypt) Aswan Governorate	679	Governorate of Egypt.
(Scotland) East Lothian	678	Unitary district of Scotland.
(Timor-Leste) Aileu	676	Municipality of East Timor.
Taraclia District	674	District of Moldova.
(Turkey) Yalova Province	674	Smallest province of Turkey.
(Solomon Islands) Rennell and Bellona Province	671	Second smallest province of the Solomon Islands.
(Niger) Niamey Department	670	Smallest department of Niger.
(United Kingdom) Armagh	667	District of Northern Ireland.
(Indonesia) Jakarta Special Capital Region	662	Smallest province of Indonesia.
(Province of Ravenna) Ravenna	653	Second largest municipality of Italy.
Dondușeni District	645	District of Moldova.
(Palestine) Bethlehem	644	Governorate of Palestine.
(Cyprus) (Northern Cyprus) Kyrenia	643.9	District of Cyprus, but entirely ruled by Northern Cyprus.
(Bhutan) Tsirang	641	Second smallest district of Bhutan.
(Croatia) Zagreb County (Grad Zagreb)	641	Smallest county of Croatia.
(United Kingdom) Down	638	District of Northern Ireland.
(United Kingdom) Ballymena	634	District of Northern Ireland.
Virginia Beach	633.83	Independent City of Virginia.
Aran	633.5	Autonomous administrative entity in Spain.
Nisporeni District	630	District of Moldova.
(Israel) Jerusalem District	627	Second smallest District of Israel.
(Thailand) Nongbua Lamphu Province	622	Third smallest province of Thailand.
(Trinidad and Tobago) Princes Town region	621.35	Region of Trinidad and Tobago.
Rezina District	621	District of Moldova.
(Philippines) Metro Manila	616.28	Municipality of the Philippines.
(Solomon Islands) Central Province	615	Smallest province of the Solomon Islands.
(Nicaragua) Masaya	611	Smallest region of Nicaragua.
(Jamaica) Saint Mary Parish	610.5	Parish of Jamaica.
(France) Territoire de Belfort	609	Department of France.
(Palestine) Jericho	608	Governorate of Palestine.
(South Korea) Seoul	606	Capital metropolitan city of South Korea.
(Philippines) Guimaras	604.57	Province of the Philippines.
(Mozambique) Maputo City	602	Capital city province of Mozambique.
(Philippines) Babuyan Islands	600	Archipelago in the northern Philippines.
(Montenegro) Bar	598	Municipality of Montenegro.
Șoldănești District	598	District of Moldova.
(North Macedonia) Berovo	597	Municipality of North Macedonia.
Ocnița District	597	District of Moldova.
(Jamaica) Saint James Parish	594.9	Parish of Jamaica.
(Apulia) Cerignola	593.92	Third largest municipality of Italy.
(Palestine) Nablus	592	Governorate of Palestine.
(Egypt) Damietta Governorate	589	Governorate of Egypt.
(United Kingdom) Limavady	585	District of Northern Ireland.
(Palestine) Jenin	583	Governorate of Palestine.
(North Macedonia) Štip	583	Municipality of North Macedonia.
(England) Doncaster	581	Metropolitan borough of England.
(Tanzania) Pemba North	574	Region of Tanzania.
Isle of Man	572	Crown dependency of the UK.
Brunei-Muara	571	District of Brunei.
Chișinău	563	District-level municipality of Moldova.
(United Kingdom) Magherafelt	562	District of Northern Ireland.
(England) Leeds	562	Metropolitan borough (city) of England.
(Sierra Leone) Western Area	557	Smallest first level subdivision of Sierra Leone.
Kočevje	555	Municipality of Slovenia.
(Montenegro) Šavnik	553	Municipality of Montenegro.
(Timor-Leste) Liquiçá	551	Municipality of East Timor.
(Senegal) Dakar Region	550	Smallest region of Senegal.
Guam	549	Country in Organized unincorporated territory of the USA.
(North Macedonia) Resen	549	Municipality of North Macedonia.
(Montenegro) Berane	544	Municipality of Montenegro.
(Thailand) Phuket Province	543	Second smallest province of Thailand.
Guam	541	Territory of the United States.
(South Korea) Daejeon	540	Second smallest metropolitan city of South Korea.
Saint Lucia	539	Country in the Caribbean.
(Philippines) Biliran	536.01	Province of the Philippines.
(Ethiopia) Addis Ababa	530	Chartered city region of Ethiopia.
(Uruguay) Montevideo Department	530	Smallest department of Uruguay.
(Trinidad and Tobago) Tunapuna–Piarco	527.23	Region of Trinidad and Tobago.
(Luxembourg) Grevenmacher	525	Smallest district of Luxembourg.
(Myanmar) Yangon Region	521	Smallest region of Myanmar (Myanmar has certain administrative divisions titled as Regions, and others titled as States).
(Bhutan) Pemagatshel	518	Smallest district of Bhutan.
Basel-Landschaft	518	Canton of Switzerland.
(North Macedonia) Veles	518	Municipality of North Macedonia.
(North Macedonia) Staro Nagoričane	515	Municipality of North Macedonia.
(Northern Cyprus) Lefkoşa	513	District of Northern Cyprus, which is internationally recognized as a part of Cyprus.
(United Kingdom) Cookstown	512	District of Northern Ireland.
(Trinidad and Tobago) Siparia region	510.48	Region of Trinidad and Tobago.
(North Macedonia) Radoviš	502	Municipality of North Macedonia.
(Montenegro) Danilovgrad	501	Municipality of Montenegro.
(South Korea) Gwangju	501	Smallest metropolitan city of South Korea.
(Wales) Wrexham	499	Unitary authority of Wales.
(Quebec) Region of Montreal	498	Region of Quebec
(England) South Gloucestershire	497	Unitary authority of England.
(Czech Republic) Prague	496	Capital city of the Czech Republic;has regional status.
(United Kingdom) Moyle	494	District of Northern Ireland.
(Bosnia and Herzegovina) Brčko District	493	Administrative unit of Bosnia and Herzegovina.
(India) Puducherry	492	Union Territory of India.
Obwalden	491	Canton of Switzerland.
(India) Dadra and Nagar Haveli	491	Union Territory of India.
(North Macedonia) Gevgelija	484	Municipality of North Macedonia.
(North Macedonia) Sveti Nikole	483	Municipality of North Macedonia.
(North Macedonia) Kriva Palanka	482	Municipality of North Macedonia.
(North Macedonia) Demir Hisar	480	Municipality of North Macedonia.
(Bahrain) Southern Governorate	480	Largest governorate of Bahrain.
Ilirska Bistrica	480	Municipality of Slovenia.
(Zimbabwe) Bulawayo	479	Independent city of Zimbabwe.
(United Kingdom) Coleraine	478	District of Northern Ireland.
Northern Mariana Islands	477	Territory of the United States.
(Province of Gorizia) Gorizia Province	475	Province of Italy.
(Scotland) North Lanarkshire	474	Unitary district of Scotland.
(Scotland) Small Isles	472	Archipelago part of Scotland.
(Tanzania) Zanzibar North	470	Region of Tanzania.
(North Macedonia) Struga	469	Municipality of North Macedonia.
Andorra	468	Country in Europe.
(Guatemala) Sacatepéquez	465	Smallest department of Guatemala.
Northern Mariana Islands	464	Commonwealth in political union with the USA. Includes 14 islands including Saipan, Rota, and Tinian.
Palau	459	Country in Oceania.
Fingal	456	Administrative county within the province of Leinster, in the Republic of Ireland.
Seychelles	455	Country in Africa.
(Norway) Oslo	454	County of Norway.
(Jamaica) Hanover Parish	450.4	Third smallest parish of Jamaica.
(Guinea) Conakry Region	450	Special Zone of Guinea.
(Azores) Pico Island	447	Second-largest island of the Azores, part of Portugal.
(Montenegro) Žabljak	445	Municipality of Montenegro.
Curaçao	444	Country in South America; self-governing part of the Kingdom of the Netherlands.
(New Zealand) Nelson	444	Unitary authority and smallest region of New Zealand.
(New Zealand) Auckland Island	442.5	Largest island of the Auckland Islands, part of New Zealand.
Antigua and Barbuda	442	Country in the Caribbean. Includes Redonda, 1.6 km^{2}.
(Wales) Neath Port Talbot	441	Unitary authority of Wales.
(United Kingdom) Banbridge	441	District of Northern Ireland.
(Wales) Flintshire	437	Unitary authority of Wales.
(United Kingdom) Lisburn	436	District of Northern Ireland.
(Transnistria) Camenca	434.5	District of Transnistria, a breakaway republic recognized as a part of Moldova.
Venezuelan Capital District (Distrito Capital)	433	Smallest state of Venezuela.
(Scotland) Isle of Arran	432.01	Largest island of the Islands of the Clyde, part of Scotland.
(North Macedonia) Kumanovo	432	Municipality of North Macedonia.
(Montenegro) Rožaje	432	Municipality of Montenegro.
(North Macedonia) Vinica	432	Municipality of North Macedonia.
(Jamaica) Saint Andrew Parish	430.7	Second smallest parish of Jamaica.
Barbados	430	Country in the Caribbean.
(Scotland) West Lothian	425	Unitary district of Scotland.
Anjouan	424	Autonomous island in the Comoros.
(Wales) Rhondda Cynon Taff	424	Unitary authority of Wales.
(North Macedonia) Debarca	423	Municipality of North Macedonia.
(North Macedonia) Delčevo	423	Municipality of North Macedonia.
(Jordan) Ajloun	420	Governorate of Jordan.
(North Macedonia) Dolneni	418	Municipality of North Macedonia.
(United Kingdom) Ballymoney	417	District of Northern Ireland.
(Thailand) Samut Songkhram Province	417	Smallest province of Thailand.
Vienna	415	Smallest state of Austria.
(North Macedonia) Negotino	414	Municipality of North Macedonia.
Heard Island and McDonald Islands	412	Australian Territory Island.
(Jordan) Jerash	410	Governorate of Jordan.
(England) Kirklees	410	Metropolitan borough of England.
(Province of Monza and Brianza) Monza and Brianza	405.55	Third smallest province of Italy.
(United Kingdom) Antrim	405	District of Northern Ireland.
(Bremen (state)) Free Hanseatic City of Bremen	404	Smallest city-state of Germany.
(Azores) Terceira Island	400.6	Third-largest island of the Azores, part of Portugal.
(French Polynesia) Leeward Islands	395	Second smallest administrative subdivision of French Polynesia.
| | (Ascension Island) | Saint Helena, Ascension and Tristan da Cunha	394	British Overseas Territory.
(United Kingdom) Lough Neagh	392	Lake in Northern Ireland. Largest lake in Great Britain and Ireland.
(North Macedonia) Ohrid	392	Municipality of North Macedonia.
Saint Vincent and the Grenadines	388	Country in the Caribbean.
(England) Rutland	382	Unitary authority of England.
Federal Territory	381.65	Locally known as "Wilayah Persekutuan". Encompasses Kuala Lumpur, Labuan and Putrajaya.
Tolmin	381.5	Municipality of Slovenia.
(Transnistria) Dubăsari	381.2	District of Transnistria, a breakaway republic recognized as a part of Moldova.
(England) Isle of Wight	380.99	Unitary authority of England.
(Yemen) Sanaa	380	City-governorate of Yemen.
(Puerto Rico) Spanish Virgin Islands	378.2	Islands part of the Virgin Islands archipelago, part of Puerto Rico.
(Wales) Swansea	378	Unitary authority (city) of Wales.
(Norway) Jan Mayen	377	Norwegian Territory Island.
(North Macedonia) Gostivar	375	Municipality of North Macedonia.
(North Macedonia) Kratovo	375	Municipality of North Macedonia.
(Dominican Republic) Lake Enriquillo	375	Lake of the Dominican Republic. It's the largest of the Hispañola and the Caribbean itself.
(England) North Somerset	375	Unitary authority of England.
Mayotte	374	Overseas department of France.
(United Kingdom) Derry	373	District of Northern Ireland.
(Palestine) Tubas	372	Governorate of Palestine.
Lake Garda	369.98	Largest lake in Italy.
(Canary Islands) La Gomera	369.76	Second-smallest of the main islands of the Canary Islands, part of Spain.
Heard Island and McDonald Islands	368	Island of Australia.
(United Kingdom) Ards	368	District of Northern Ireland.
Bovec	367.3	Municipality of Slovenia.
(Montenegro) Mojkovac	367	Municipality of Montenegro.
(England) Sheffield	367	Metropolitan borough (city) of England.
(England) Bradford	366	Metropolitan borough (city) of England.
(Tuscany) Prato Province	365.5	Second smallest province of Italy.
(Palestine) Gaza Strip	365	Smaller one of the two territories of Palestine.
(England) Calderdale	363	Metropolitan borough of England.
(North Macedonia) Kočani	357	Municipality of North Macedonia.
(Scotland) Midlothian	356	Unitary district of Scotland.
(French Southern and Antarctic Lands) Crozet Islands	352	District of the French Southern and Antarctic Lands.
(England) Bath and North East Somerset	351	Unitary authority of England.
(Georgia (country)) Tbilisi	350	Capital region of Georgia.
United States Virgin Islands	347	Unincorporated, organized territory of the USA in the Caribbean.
Pohnpei	346	Largest state of the Federated States of Micronesia.
United Nations Buffer Zone in Cyprus	346	Demilitarised zone patrolled by the United Nations Peacekeeping Force in Cyprus to separate Cyprus and Northern Cyprus.
Grenada	344	Country in the Caribbean.
(Palestine) Quds	344	Governorate of Palestine.
(Saint Vincent and the Grenadines) Saint Vincent	344	Largest island of Saint Vincent and the Grenadines.
(Luxembourg) Clervaux	342.17	Largest canton of Luxembourg.
Federal Dependencies of Venezuela	342	Venezuela's off shore islands in the Caribbean Sea and the Gulf of Venezuela.
Črnomelj	339.7	Municipality of Slovenia.
(Philippines) Siquijor	337.49	Third smallest province of the Philippines.
(Wales) Vale of Glamorgan	337	Unitary authority of Wales.
(United Kingdom) Larne	337	District of Northern Ireland.
(Cambodia) City of Kep	335.8	Self-governing city of Cambodia.
Bohinj	333.7	Municipality of Slovenia.
(England) Wakefield	333	Metropolitan borough (city) of England.
(England) Peterborough	333	Unitary authority of England.
(Tanzania) Pemba South	332	Region of Tanzania.
(North Macedonia) Valandovo	331	Municipality of North Macedonia.
(England) Barnsley	328	Metropolitan borough of England.
Caribbean Netherlands	328	The three special municipalities of the Netherlands in the Caribbean--Bonaire, Saba and Sint Eustatius.
(Montenegro) Plav	328	Municipality of Montenegro.
(Canada) Helena Island	326	Island in the Arctic Archipelago.
(North Macedonia) Probištip	326	Municipality of North Macedonia.
(Qatar) Umm Salal	318	Third smallest municipality of Qatar.
Malta	316	Country in Europe.
(North Macedonia) Demir Kapija	312	Municipality of North Macedonia.
(Ethiopia) Harari Region	311	Smallest region of Ethiopia.
(North Macedonia) Strumica	311	Municipality of North Macedonia.
(Latvia) Riga	307	Largest city of Latvia with separate status (not part of any district).
Dubăsari District	309	District of Moldova.
(England) Milton Keynes	309	Unitary authority of England.
City of Minsk	305.5	Capital and the largest city of Belarus.
Koper	304	Municipality of Slovenia.
(Japan) Izu Islands	301.56	Archipelago part of Japan.
(Trinidad and Tobago) Tobago	300	Autonomous Island of Trinidad and Tobago.
(Uzbekistan) Tashkent	300	Capital province and smallest province of Uzbekistan.
(Scotland) Falkirk	299	Unitary district of Scotland.
Novo Mesto	298.5	Municipality of Slovenia.
Maldives	298	Country in Asia.
Canton of Schaffhausen	298	Canton of Switzerland.
Basarabeasca District	295	Smallest non-municipality district of Moldova.
Bonaire	294	Special municipality of the Kingdom of the Netherlands.
Idrija	293.7	Municipality of Slovenia.
(North Macedonia) Gradsko	291	Municipality of North Macedonia.
(South Africa) Marion Island	290	Sub-antarctic territory of South Africa
(Cambodia) City of Phnom Penh	290	Self-governing city of Cambodia.
(England) Telford and Wrekin	290	Unitary authority of England.
(Qatar) Al Daayen	290	Second smallest municipality of Qatar.
Bonaire	288	Dutch Territory Island.
Krško	286.5	Municipality of Slovenia.
(Montenegro) Andrijevica	283	Municipality of Montenegro.
(England) Rotherham	283	Metropolitan borough of England.
Canton of Geneva	282	Canton of Switzerland.
Nova Gorica	280	Municipality of Slovenia.
(United Kingdom) Craigavon	280	District of Northern Ireland.
(Wales) Caerphilly	279	Unitary authority of Wales.
Nidwalden	276	Canton of Switzerland.
(North Macedonia) Studeniċani	276	Municipality of North Macedonia.
Ljubljana	275	The largest and capital city of Slovenia.
Sevnica	272.17	Municipality of Slovenia.
Taipei	271.8	Special municipality and capital of Taiwan.
(England) York	271	Unitary authority (city) of England.
(North Macedonia) Lipkovo	270	Municipality of North Macedonia.
Postojna	269.9	Municipality of Slovenia.
(Canary Islands) El Hierro	268.71	Smallest of the main islands of the Canary Islands, part of Spain.
Brežice	268.1	Municipality of Slovenia.
(Luxembourg) Redange	267.49	Second largest canton of Luxembourg.
(São Tomé and Príncipe) Caué	267	Largest district of São Tomé and Príncipe.
Kamnik	266	Municipality of Slovenia.
(England) Birmingham	265	Metropolitan borough (city) of England.
(Luxembourg) Wiltz	264.55	Third largest canton of Luxembourg.
Cayman Islands	264	British Overseas Territory.
(Scotland) Edinburgh	262	Unitary district (city) of Scotland.
(North Macedonia) Tetovo	262	Municipality of North Macedonia.
(Honduras) Islas de la Bahía	261	Smallest department of Honduras.
(Scotland) Renfrewshire	261	Unitary district of Scotland.
Saint Kitts and Nevis	261	Country in the Caribbean.
Slovenska Bistrica	260.1	Municipality of Slovenia.
Niue	260	Country in Oceania. Self-governing nation in free association with New Zealand.
(Emirate of Ajman) Ajman	259	Smallest emirate of the United Arab Emirates.
(North Macedonia) Novo Selo	257	Municipality of North Macedonia.
Kranjska Gore	256.3	Municipality of Slovenia.
(North Macedonia) Mogila	255	Municipality of North Macedonia.
(Montenegro) Ulcinj	255	Municipality of Montenegro.
Akrotiri and Dhekelia	254	British Cyprus Territory Island.
(Mali) Bamako Capital District	252	Capital district of Mali.

== See also ==
Other divisions

- 0.1 to 1,000,000+ square kilometers
- 1,000,000+ square kilometers

Smaller divisions

- 200,000+ square kilometers • 100,000 to 1,000,000 square kilometers • 50,000 to 200,000 square kilometers • 20,000 to 50,000 square kilometers
- 5,000 to 20,000 square kilometers • 1,000 to 5,000 square kilometers • 0.1 to 1,000 square kilometers
- 500,000 to 1,000,000 square kilometers • 200,000 to 500,000 square kilometers • 100,000 to 200,000 square kilometers
- 50,000 to 100,000 square kilometers • 30,000 to 50,000 square kilometers • 20,000 to 30,000 square kilometers • 10,000 to 20,000 square kilometers
- 7,000 to 10,000 square kilometers • 5,000 to 7,000 square kilometers • 3,000 to 5,000 square kilometers • 1,000 to 3,000 square kilometers
- 250 to 1,000 square kilometers • 50 to 250 square kilometers • Under 50 square kilometers

Other

- List of countries and dependencies by area
- List of largest empires
- List of administrative divisions by country
- Category:Ranked lists of country subdivisions
