= Taiwanfu =

Taiwanfu (Chinese: 臺灣府; pinyin: Táiwānfǔ) may refer to:

- Taiwan Prefecture, a prefecture ruled by the Qing dynasty as a part of Fujian province
  - Tainan, known as Taiwanfu when it served as the prefectural capital (c. 1885)
  - Taichung, known as Taiwanfu when it served as the prefectural capital (1885–1895)
- Zengwen or Zengwun River, formerly known as the Taiwanfu River after adjacent Tainan

== See also ==
- Taiwan (disambiguation)
- Fu (administrative division)
