= Dennery River =

River of Saint Lucia

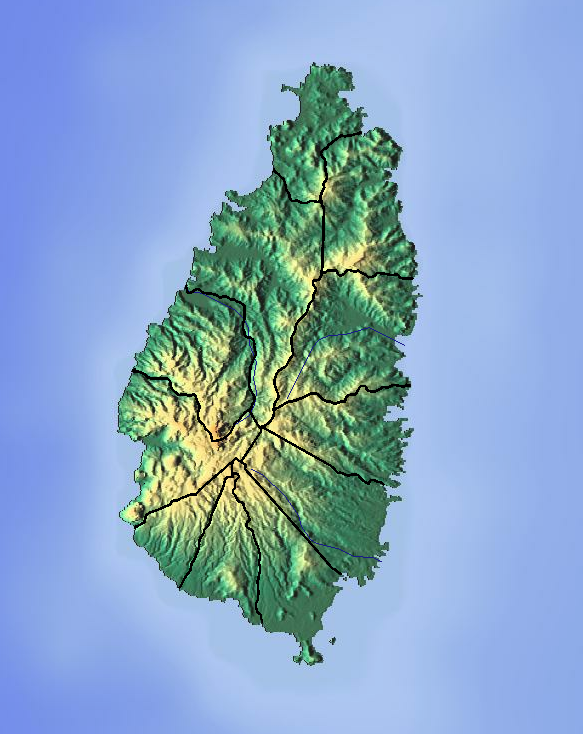
- Location of mouth

Location
- Country: Saint Lucia
- Region: Dennery Quarter

Physical characteristics
- Mouth: Atlantic Ocean
  - coordinates: 13°54′N 60°53′W
  - elevation: Sea level

The Dennery River is the river on the southern end of the fishing village of Dennery on the island of Saint Lucia. The community of Dennery is built on its flood plain and in recent times has been the cause of serious flooding in the coastal community. It drains into the Atlantic Ocean.

== Hazards ==
It has been advised that all human contact with the water should be avoided as it is hazardous to health. The water is polluted and full of bacteria causing potential harm.

== See also ==
- List of rivers of Saint Lucia
