= Fond d'Or River =

River of Saint Lucia

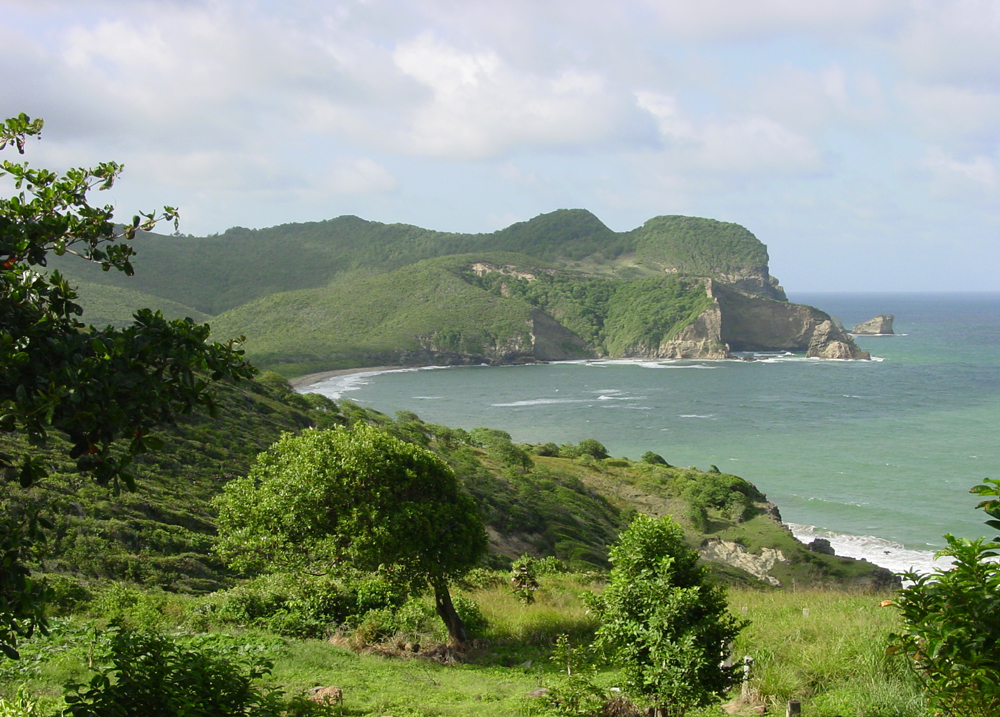
- Fond d'Or Bay

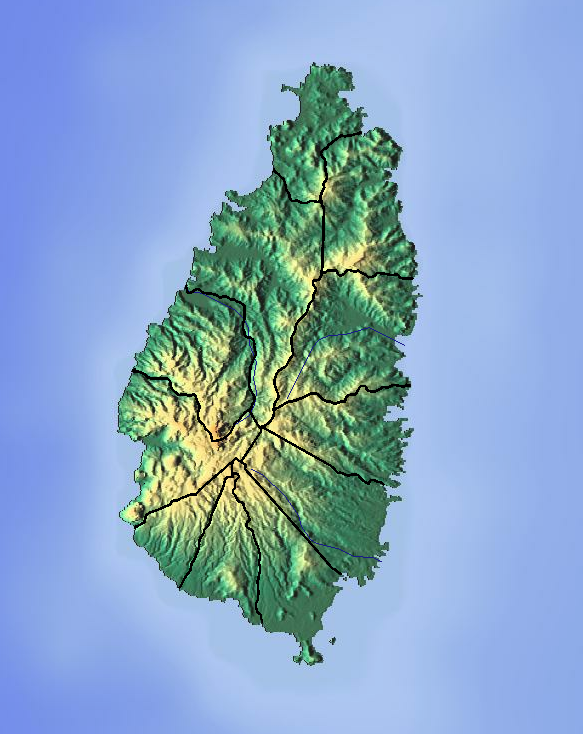
- Location of mouth

Location
- Country: Saint Lucia
- Region: Dennery Quarter

Physical characteristics
- Mouth: Fond d'Or Bay, Atlantic Ocean
  - coordinates: 13°55′N 60°53′W

The Fond d'Or River is a river in Saint Lucia. It rises in the centre of the island, flowing north and then east to its mouth in Fond d'Or Bay, close to the village of Dennery on the central east coast.

== See also ==
- List of rivers of Saint Lucia
