= Fond d'Or Bay =

Body of water of Saint Lucia

Coordinates: 13.92207°N 60.886194°W

- Anse Fond d'Or
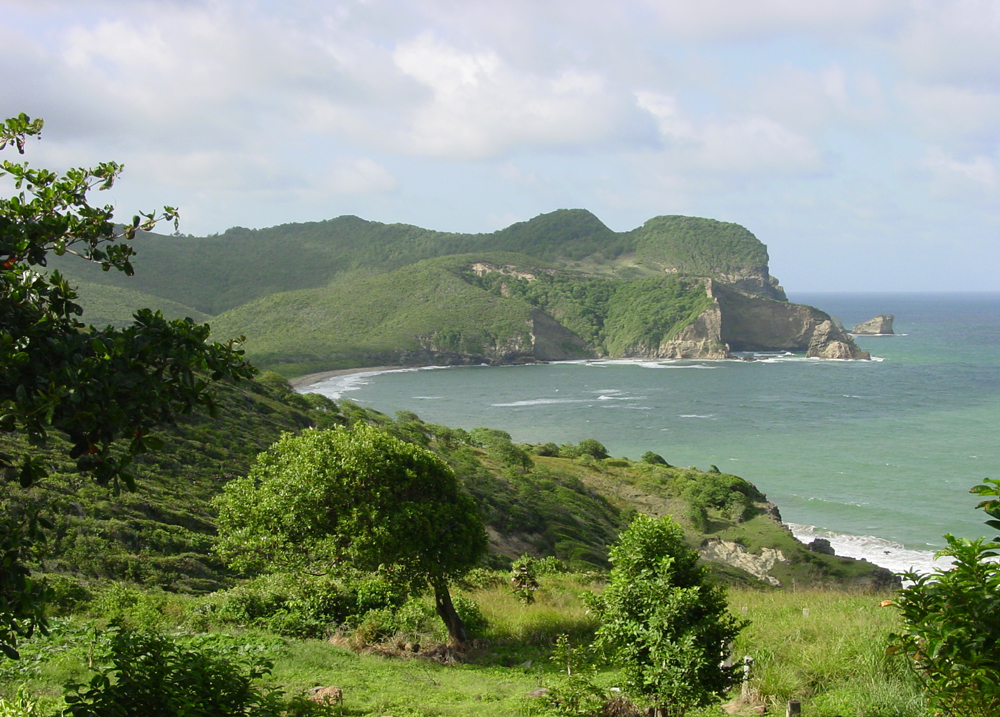
- Fond d'Or Bay

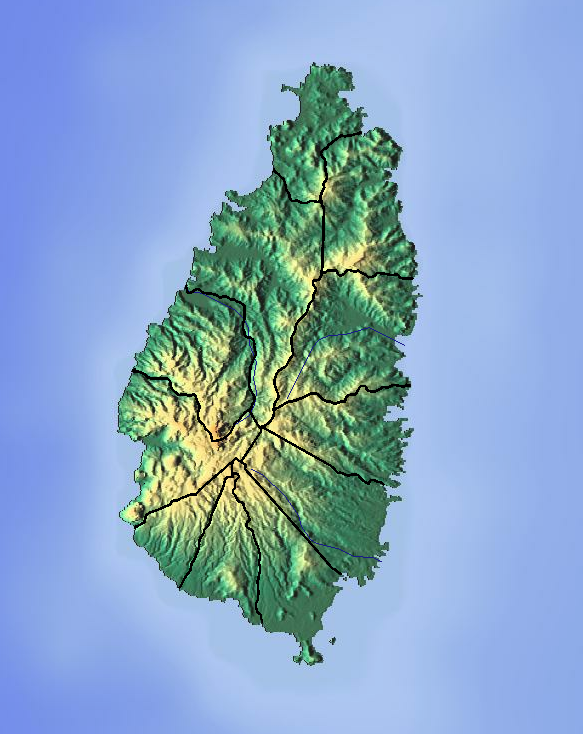
- Location of bay
- Location: Dennery Quarter, Saint Lucia
- Part of: Atlantic Ocean

Fond d'Or Bay is a bay on the east side of the island of Saint Lucia, in the center of the coast. The Fond d'Or River has its mouth in the bay.

== See also ==
- List of rivers of Saint Lucia
