= List of political and geographic subdivisions by total area from 3,000 to 5,000 square kilometers =

This is one of a series of comprehensive lists of continents, countries, and first level administrative country subdivisions such as states, provinces, and territories, as well as certain political and geographic features of substantial area. References for the information provided in this table may be found in the individual articles on each body listed herein. Some divisions are listed twice, with one listing including territory that is excluded in the other for various reasons, including territorial disputes. There is intentional overlap among the lists in order to maximize ease of use.

Geographic entity	Area (km^{2})	Notes
(France) Jura	4,999	Department of France.
Balearic Islands	4,992	Smallest autonomous community of Spain.
(Uruguay) San José Department	4,992	Department of Uruguay.
Fukuoka	4,986.40	Prefecture of Japan.
(Romania) Botoșani County	4,986	County of Romania.
(France) Haute-Loire	4,977	Department of France.
(Russia) Kolguyev Island	4,968	Island part of Russia.
Sabaragamuwa	4,968	Province of Sri Lanka.
(Costa Rica) San José Province	4,960	Third smallest province of Costa Rica.
(Portugal) Faro	4,960	District of Portugal.
(Bulgaria) Stara Zagora Province	4,959	Province of Bulgaria.
Morelos	4,950	State of Mexico.
(Paraguay) Cordillera Department	4,948	Department of Paraguay.
(Finland) Kymenlaakso	4,947.65	Region of Finland.
(Afghanistan) Kunar Province	4,942	Province of Afghanistan.
(Romania) Mehedinți County	4,933	County of Romania.
(Panama) Coclé	4,927	Province of Panama.
(Philippines) Surigao del Sur	4,925.18	Province of the Philippines.
(Province of Salerno) Salerno Province	4,923	Province of Italy.
(Thailand) Trang Province	4,918	Province of Thailand.
(Norway) Akershus	4,917	County of Norway.
(Province of Udine) Udine Province	4,905	Province of Italy.
(Algeria) Aïn Defla Province	4,897	Province of Algeria.
(Ecuador) Imbabura Province	4,896	Province of Ecuador.
(Haiti) Artibonite	4,895	Largest department of Haiti.
(Panama) Colón Province	4,891	Province of Panama.
(France) Ariège	4,890	Department of France.
(Cambodia) Prey Veng Province	4,883	Province of Cambodia.
(Malawi) Chikwawa	4,878	District of Malawi.
(Cambodia) Kampot Province	4,873.2	Province of Cambodia.
(Algeria) Relizane Province	4,870	Province of Algeria.
(Vietnam) Bắc Kạn Province	4,868.40	Province of Vietnam.
(Brazil) Ilha Grande de Gurupá	4,864	Fluvial island part of Brazil.
County Donegal	4,860	County in the Republic of Ireland, largest county in the province of Ulster.
(Nigeria) Abia State	4,857	Third smallest state of Nigeria.
(Romania) Vrancea County	4,857	County of Romania.
Lake Nipigon	4,843	Lake in Canada.
(Nicaragua) Chinandega	4,822	Region of Nicaragua.
(Philippines) Bohol	4,820.95	Province of the Philippines.
(Turkey) Sakarya Province	4,817	Province of Turkey.
County Kerry	4,807	County in the Republic of Ireland, second largest county in the province of Munster.
(Papua New Guinea) Jiwaka Province	4,798	Third smallest province of Papua New Guinea.
(Uruguay) Maldonado Department	4,793	Third smallest department of Uruguay.
(Algeria) Chlef Province	4,791	Province of Algeria.
(Province of Brescia) Brescia Province	4,785.62	Province of Italy.
(France) Loire	4,781	Department of France.
(Romania) Brăila County	4,766	County of Romania.
(Thailand) Prachinburi Province	4,762	Province of Thailand.
(Nigeria) Anambra State	4,761	Second smallest state of Nigeria.
(Jordan) Zarqa	4,761	Governorate of Jordan.
(Vietnam) Quảng Trị Province	4,760.10	Province of Vietnam.
(Czech Republic) Hradec Králové Region	4,758.54	Region of the Czech Republic.
(France) Bas-Rhin	4,755	Department of France.
(Scotland) Scottish Borders	4,734	Unitary district of Scotland.
Wakayama	4,724.69	Prefecture of Japan.
(Romania) Prahova County	4,716	County of Romania.
(Thailand) Khon Kaen Province	4,709	Province of Thailand.
Lake Manitoba	4,706	Lake in Canada.
(Bulgaria) Dobrich Province	4,700	Province of Bulgaria.
(Djibouti) Obock Region	4,700	Region of Djibouti.
(Turkey) Batman Province	4,694	Province of Turkey.
(Denmark) North Jutlandic Island	4,685	Island part of Denmark.
(Turkey) Trabzon Province	4,685	Province of Turkey.
(Vietnam) Hòa Bình Province	4,684.20	Province of Vietnam.
(Bulgaria) Veliko Tarnovo Province	4,684	Province of Bulgaria.
(France) Haute-Corse	4,666	Department of France.
Great Salt Lake	4,662	Lake in the United States.
Carabobo	4,650	State of Venezuela.
(Japan) Ryukyu Islands	4,642.11	Chain of islands part of Japan.
(Philippines) Eastern Samar	4,640.73	Province of the Philippines.
(Ecuador) Isabela Island	4,640	Largest island of the Galapagos Island, part of Ecuador.
(Indonesia) Lombok	4,625	Island part of Indonesia.
Kyoto	4,612.19	Prefecture of Japan.
(Panama) Bocas del Toro Province	4,601	Province of Panama.
(Haiti) Ouest	4,595	Second largest department of Haiti.
(Georgia (country)) Racha-Lechkhumi and Kvemo Svaneti	4,568	Second smallest region of Georgia.
(Bhutan) Gasa	4,561	Largest district of Bhutan.
Lake Taymyr	4,560	Lake in Russia.
(Malawi) Rumphi	4,560	District of Malawi.
(Algeria) Souk Ahras Province	4,541	Province of Algeria.
(Croatia) Split-Dalmatia	4,540	Second largest county of Croatia.
(Uruguay) Canelones Department	4,536	Second smallest department of Uruguay.
(Thailand) Phetchaburi Province	4,531	Province of Thailand.
(Falkland Islands) West Falkland	4,531	Smaller of the 2 main islands of the Falkland Islands.
(Thailand) Yala Province	4,521	Province of Thailand.
(Czech Republic) Pardubice Region	4,518.63	Region of the Czech Republic.
(Armenia) Syunik Province	4,506	Second largest province of Armenia.
(Thailand) Lampang Province	4,506	Province of Thailand.
(Province of Grosseto) Grosseto Province	4,504	Province of Italy.
(Israel) Northern District	4,501	Second largest District of Israel.
(Vietnam) Long An Province	4,493.80	Province of Vietnam.
(Hungary) Veszprém	4,493	County of Hungary.
Qinghai Lake	4,489	Lake in China.
(Philippines) Davao de Oro	4,479.77	Province of the Philippines.
(Indonesia) Belitung	4,478	Island part of Indonesia.
(Thailand) Nan Province	4,475	Province of Thailand.
(Philippines) Cebu	4,468	Island part of the Philippines.
(Croatia) Sisak-Moslavina	4,468	Third largest county of Croatia.
(Romania) Galați County	4,466	County of Romania.
Yamanashi	4,465.27	Prefecture of Japan.
(France) Hautes-Pyrénées	4,464	Department of France.
(Lithuania) Marijampolė County	4,463	County of Lithuania.
Adelaide Island	4,463	Island part of Antarctica.
(Canada) Stefansson Island	4,463	Island part of the Arctic Archipelago.
(Afghanistan) Kabul Province	4,462	Province of Afghanistan.
(Romania) Ialomița County	4,453	County of Romania.
(Luxembourg (Belgium)) Luxembourg	4,443	Province of Wallonia, Belgium.
(Algeria) Bouira Province	4,439	Province of Algeria.
Molise	4,438	Second smallest region of Italy.
(Hungary) Baranya	4,430	County of Hungary.
(Indonesia) Madura Island	4,429	Island part of Indonesia.
(Philippines) South Cotabato	4,428.81	Province of the Philippines; includes the independent city of General Santos.
(Romania) Satu Mare County	4,418	County of Romania.
(Lithuania) Tauragė County	4,411	County of Lithuania.
(Indonesia) Buton	4,408	Island part of Indonesia.
(Azerbaijan) Nagorno-Karabakh	4,400	Disputed territory. Recognized as part of Azerbaijan.
Saimaa	4,400	Lake in Finland, area is estimated.
(Panama) Emberá	4,398	Province of Panama.
(Bulgaria) Pazardzhik Province	4,393	Province of Bulgaria.
(France) Haute-Savoie	4,388	Department of France.
(Guatemala) Escuintla	4,384	Department of Guatemala.
(Philippines) Nueva Vizcaya	4,378.80	Province of the Philippines.
(Australia) Kangaroo Island	4,374	Island part of Australia.
(Turkey) Kırıkkale Province	4,365	Province of Turkey.
(Thailand) Chiang Rai Province	4,363	Province of Thailand.
(Alaska) Admiralty Island	4,362	Island part of the U.S. state of Alaska.
(Hungary) Fejér	4,359	County of Hungary.
(Senegal) Diourbel Region	4,359	Third smallest region of Senegal.
(Philippines) Apayao	4,351.23	Province of the Philippines.
(Lithuania) Telšiai County	4,350	County of Lithuania.
Lake of the Woods	4,350	Lake in North America between Canada and the United States.
(Thailand) Maha Sarakham Province	4,340	Province of Thailand.
(Malawi) Nkhotakota	4,338	District of Malawi.
(Malawi) Chitipa	4,334	District of Malawi.
(Portugal) Vila Real	4,328	District of Portugal.
Harju County	4,327	Second largest county of Estonia.
(Turkey) Bilecik Province	4,307	Province of Turkey.
County Tipperary	4,305	County in the Republic of Ireland, third largest county in the province of Munster.
(France) Alpes-Maritimes	4,299	Department of France.
(Papua New Guinea) Western Highlands Province	4,299	Second smallest province of Papua New Guinea.
(Fiji) Central	4,293	A subdivision of Fiji.
(Honduras) Lempira	4,290	Department of Honduras.
(Lesotho) Maseru	4,279	District of Lesotho.
(Lesotho) Thaba-Tseka	4,270	District of Lesotho.
(Hungary) Csongrád	4,263	County of Hungary.
(Honduras) Atlántida	4,251	Department of Honduras.
(Vanuatu) Sanma Province	4,248	Largest province of Vanuatu.
Toyama	4,247.61	Prefecture of Japan.
(Serbia) South Banat	4,245	District of Serbia.
(Philippines) Oriental Mindoro	4,238.38	Province of the Philippines.
(Solomon Islands) Malaita Province	4,225	Third largest province of the Solomon Islands.
(Bulgaria) Pleven Province	4,216	Province of Bulgaria.
(Honduras) Choluteca	4,211	Department of Honduras.
(Alaska) Nunivak Island	4,209	Island part of the U.S. state of Alaska.
(Bulgaria) Yambol Province	4,209	Province of Bulgaria.
(Hungary) Győr-Moson-Sopron	4,208	County of Hungary.
(Uzbekistan) Andijan Region	4,200	Second smallest region of Uzbekistan.
(Philippines) Abra	4,198.20	Province of the Philippines.
Fukui	4,190.49	Prefecture of Japan.
Khanka Lake	4,190	Lake in Asia between Russia and China.
Ishikawa	4,186.09	Prefecture of Japan.
(Norway) Østfold	4,183	County of Norway.
(Malawi) Nhkata Bay	4,182	District of Malawi.
(Egypt) Sharqia Governorate	4,180	Governorate of Egypt.
(Nicaragua) Boaco	4,177	Region of Nicaragua.
(Thailand) Pattani Province	4,171	Province of Thailand.
French Polynesia	4,167	French overseas collectivity.
Transnistria	4,163	Also known as Pridnestrovie, it is a breakaway state internationally recognised as a part of the Republic of Moldova.
(Thailand) Yasothon Province	4,162	Province of Thailand.
(Senegal) Kaolack Region	4,157	Second smallest region of Senegal.
(Croatia) Osijek-Baranja	4,155	County of Croatia.
(Afghanistan) Khost Province	4,152	Province of Afghanistan.
(Philippines) Masbate	4,151.78	Province of the Philippines.
(Cuba) Cienfuegos Province	4,149	Third smallest province of Cuba.
Tokushima	4,146.65	Prefecture of Japan.
(Colombia) Risaralda Department	4,140	District of Colombia.
(Solomon Islands) Isabel	4,136	Province of the Solomon Islands.
(Bulgaria) Lovech Province	4,134	Province of Bulgaria.
Nagasaki	4,132.09	Prefecture of Japan.
(Alaska) Nunivak Island	4,119	Island part of the U.S. state of Alaska.
(Chile) Hoste Island	4,117	Island part of Chile.
(France) Pyrénées-Orientales	4,116	Department of France.
(Algeria) Bordj Bou Arreridj Province	4,115	Province of Algeria.
(Algeria) Guelma Province	4,101	Province of Algeria.
Spaatz Island	4,100	Island part of Antarctica.
(Bulgaria) Vratsa Province	4,098	Province of Bulgaria.
(Eswatini) Manzini	4,093.59	Region of Eswatini.
North Holland	4,092	Province of The Netherlands
(Lesotho) Mokhotlong	4,075	District of Lesotho.
(Turkey) Karabük Province	4,074	Province of Turkey.
(Philippines) Sulu Archipelago	4,068	Chain of islands in the Malay Archipelago part of the Philippines.
(Alaska) Baranof Island	4,065	Island part of the U.S. state of Alaska.
(Romania) Dâmbovița County	4,054	County of Romania.
(Indonesia) Nias	4,048	Island part of Indonesia.
(Bhutan) Wangdue Phodrang	4,046	Second largest district of Bhutan.
(Peru) Tumbes Region	4,046	Second smallest region of Peru.
(Vietnam) Tây Ninh Province	4,035.90	Province of Vietnam.
Cape Verde	4,033	Country in Africa.
(Bulgaria) Haskovo Province	4,033	Province of Bulgaria.
(Bulgaria) Kardzhali Province	4,032	Province of Bulgaria.
(Algeria) Skikda Province	4,026	Province of Algeria.
Shiga	4,017.38	Prefecture of Japan.
(Serbia) South Bačka	4,016	District of Serbia.
Tlaxcala	4,016	State of Mexico.
Pa Laung	4,015	Self-administered zone in Myanmar.
(France) Corse-du-Sud	4,014	Department of France.
Republic of Ingushetia	4,000	Federal subject of Russia (estimated; the exact area is unknown as the border of Ingushetia with Chechnya has not been demarcated).
(Yemen) Ad Dali' Governorate	4,000	Third smallest governorate of Yemen.
Burgenland	3,966	Third smallest state of Austria.
(Czech Republic) Zlín Region	3,963.55	Third smallest region of the Czech Republic.
(Haiti) Centre	3,597	Third largest department of Haiti.
(Vanuatu) Espiritu Santo	3,955.5	Largest island of Vanuatu.
(Honduras) Cortés	3,954	Department of Honduras.
Sarygamysh Lake	3,950	Lake in Asia between Uzbekistan and Turkmenistan.
(Portugal) Coimbra	3,947	District of Portugal.
(Equatorial Guinea) Kié-Ntem	3,943	Province of Equatorial Guinea.
(Jamaica) Cornwall County	3,939.3	County of Jamaica.
(Laos) Vientiane Province	3,920	Smallest province of Laos.
(Turkey) Rize Province	3,920	Province of Turkey.
(Serbia) Raška	3,918	District of Serbia.
(Greenland) Milne Land	3,913	Island part of Greenland.
(Ecuador) Cañar Province	3,908	Province of Ecuador.
South Georgia and the South Sandwich Islands	3,903	British Territory Antarctica Island.
South Ossetia	3,900	Partially recognised country.
(Liberia) Grand Kru	3,895	County of Liberia.
(Emirate of Dubai) Dubai	3,885	Second largest emirate of the United Arab Emirates.
(Afghanistan) Logar Province	3,880	Province of Afghanistan.
(Serbia) Braničevo	3,865	District of Serbia.
(Romania) Sălaj County	3,864	County of Romania.
(Thailand) Narathiwat Province	3,859	Province of Thailand.
(Paraguay) Guairá	3,846	Third smallest department of Paraguay.
(Liège Province) Liège	3,844	Province of Wallonia, Belgium.
(Afghanistan) Laghman Province	3,843	Province of Afghanistan.
(Solomon Islands) Choiseul	3,837	Province of the Solomon Islands.
(Solomon Islands) Malaita	3,386	Second-largest island of the Solomon Islands.
(Greece) North Aegean	3,836	Third smallest periphery of Greece.
Dubawnt Lake	3,833	Lake in Canada.
(Indonesia) Siberut	3,829	Island part of Indonesia.
(Vietnam) Bắc Giang Province	3,827.40	Province of Vietnam.
(Metropolitan City of Bari) Bari Province	3,825	Province of Italy.
(Philippines) Lanao del Norte	3,824.79	Province of the Philippines; includes the independent city of Iligan.
(Tuscany) Siena Province	3,821	Province of Italy.
(Philippines) Bohol	3,821	Island part of the Philippines.
(Bulgaria) Varna Province	3,819	Province of Bulgaria.
(Greece) Attica	3,808	Second smallest periphery of Greece.
(Panama) Los Santos Province	3,805	Province of Panama.
(England) Suffolk	3,801	Administrative county of England.
(Hainaut Province) Hainaut	3,800	Province of Wallonia, Belgium.
Saitama	3,797.75	Prefecture of Japan.
(Yemen) Socotra	3,796	Archipelago part of Yemen.
(Guatemala) San Marcos	3,791	Department of Guatemala.
(Armenia) Lori Province	3,789	Third largest province of Armenia.
(Eswatini) Shiselweni	3,786.71	Region of Eswatini.
(Hungary) Zala	3,784	County of Hungary.
(Afghanistan) Panjshir	3,771	Province of Afghanistan.
(Malawi) Dedza	3,754	District of Malawi.
(Syria) Daraa	3,730	Governorate of Syria.
(South Georgia and the South Sandwich Islands) South Georgia	3,718	Main island of the British territory of South Georgia and the South Sandwich Islands
(France) Tarn-et-Garonne	3,718	Department of France.
(Philippines) Zambales	3,714.40	Province of the Philippines; includes the independent city of Olongapo.
(Romania) Covasna County	3,710	Third smallest county of Romania.
(Greece) Euboea	3,707	Island part of Greece.
(Hungary) Tolna	3,703	County of Hungary.
(India) Goa	3,702	State of India.
(Metropolitan City of Bologna) Bologna Province	3,702	Province of Italy.
(Ecuador) Carchi Province	3,699	Third smallest province of Ecuador.
Lääne-Viru County	3,696	Third largest county of Estonia.
(Philippines) Northern Samar	3,692.93	Province of the Philippines.
Nara	3,690.94	Prefecture of Japan.
(England) Hampshire	3,688	Administrative county of England.
(Chile) Santa Inés Island	3,688	Island part of Chile.
South Shetland Islands	3,687	Archipelago of Antarctica.
Western	3,684	Province of Sri Lanka.
(Balearic Islands) Mallorca	3,667	Largest island of the Balearic Islands, part of Spain.
(Solomon Islands) Santa Isabel Island	3,665	Third-largest island of the Solomon Islands.
(Namur Province) Namur	3,664	Province of Wallonia, Belgium.
(Turkey) Bayburt Province	3,652	Province of Turkey.
(Bulgaria) Sliven Province	3,646	Province of Bulgaria.
(Croatia) Zadar	3,646	County of Croatia.
(Hungary) Heves	3,637	County of Hungary.
(New York (state)) Long Island	3,629	Island part of the U.S. state of New York.
(Croatia) Karlovac	3,626	County of Croatia.
(Turkey) Kocaeli Province	3,626	Province of Turkey.
(Eswatini) Hhohho	3,625.17	Region of Eswatini.
(Serbia) Zaječae	3,623	District of Serbia.
(Lazio) Viterbo Province	3,615	Province of Italy.
Danu	3,610.6	Self-administered zone in Myanmar.
(Afghanistan) Panjshir Province	3,610	Province of Afghanistan.
(Province of Belluno) Belluno Province	3,609	Province of Italy.
(Philippines) Zamboanga Sibugay	3,607.75	Province of the Philippines.
(Yemen) Socotra (main island)	3,607	Largest island of the Socotra archipelago, part of Yemen.
(Philippines) Sarangani	3,601.25	Province of the Philippines.
(Indonesia) Wetar	3,600	Island part of Indonesia.
(Bulgaria) Montana Province	3,595	Province of Bulgaria.
(Latvia) Liepāja district	3,594	Largest district of Latvia.
(Croatia) Primorje-Gorski Kotar	3,588	County of Croatia.
(Malawi) Machinga	3,582	District of Malawi.
(Thailand) Saraburi Province	3,577	Province of Thailand.
(Sicily) Catania Province	3,573.68	Province of Italy.
(Dominican Republic) San Juan	3,569.39	Largest province of the Dominican Republic.
(Cambodia) Kandal Province	3,568	Third smallest province of Cambodia.
(France) Vaucluse	3,567	Department of France.
(Cambodia) Takéo Province	3,563	Second smallest province of Cambodia.
(Albania) Shkodër County	3,562	Second largest county of Albania.
(England) Cornwall	3,559	Administrative county of England.
(Province of Alessandria) Alessandria Province	3,558.83	Province of Italy.
Lake Peipus	3,555	Lake in Europe between Estonia and Russia.
(Thailand) Rayong Province	3,552	Province of Thailand.
(Philippines) Agusan del Norte	3,546.86	Province of the Philippines; includes the independent city of Butuan.
(Vietnam) Thái Nguyên Province	3,546.60	Province of Vietnam.
(England) Kent	3,543	Administrative county of England.
(Greenland) Traill Island	3,542	Island part of Greenland.
(Turkey) Iğdır Province	3,539	Province of Turkey.
(Vietnam) An Giang Province	3,536.80	Province of Vietnam.
(Bulgaria) Smolyan Province	3,532	Province of Bulgaria.
(Lesotho) Mohale's Hoek	3,530	District of Lesotho.
(Vietnam) Phú Thọ Province	3,528.40	Province of Vietnam.
(Romania) Giurgiu County	3,526	Second smallest county of Romania.
(France) Haut-Rhin	3,525	Department of France.
(Serbia) Pčinja	3,520	District of Serbia.
(Philippines) Misamis Oriental	3,515.70	Province of the Philippines; includes the independent city of Cagayan de Oro.
(Portugal) Leiria	3,515	District of Portugal.
(Metropolitan City of Florence) Florence Province	3,514	Province of Italy.
Tottori	3,507.05	Prefecture of Japan.
(Serbia) Bor	3,507	District of Serbia.
(Philippines) Ilocos Norte	3,504.30	Province of the Philippines.
Bear Island	3,500	Island part of Antarctica.
(Oman) Muscat Governorate	3,500	Second smallest governorate of Oman.
(Jordan) Karak	3,495	Governorate of Jordan.
(Nicaragua) Nueva Segovia	3,491	Region of Nicaragua.
(Philippines) Quirino	3,486.16	Province of the Philippines.
(Serbia) Srem	3,486	District of Serbia.
(Turkey) Zonguldak Province	3,481	Province of Turkey.
(Nigeria) Lagos State	3,475	Smallest state of Nigeria.
(Egypt) Dakahlia Governorate	3,471	Governorate of Egypt.
(England) Essex	3,469	Administrative county of England.
(Nicaragua) Managua	3,465	Region of Nicaragua.
(England) Somerset	3,451	Administrative county of England.
County Clare	3,450	County in the Munster province of the Republic of Ireland.
(Province of Parma) Parma Province	3,449	Province of Italy.
(Province of Matera) Matera Province	3,447	Province of Italy.
(The Bahamas) North Andros Island	3,439	Largest island of The Bahamas.
(Egypt) Kafr el-Sheikh Governorate	3,437	Governorate of Egypt.
(Philippines) Davao del Norte	3,426.97	Province of the Philippines.
(Philippines) Tawi-Tawi	3,426.55	Province of the Philippines.
(Thailand) Phang Nga Province	3,425	Province of Thailand.
Overijssel	3,421	Province of The Netherlands
Viljandi County	3,420	County of Estonia.
(Malawi) Karonga	3,416	District of Malawi.
(Colombia) Atlántico Department	3,388	District of Colombia.
(Guinea-Bissau) Tombali	3,376.5	Region of Guinea-Bissau.
(Vietnam) Đồng Tháp Province	3,376.40	Province of Vietnam.
(Bulgaria) Shumen Province	3,365	Province of Bulgaria.
(Vietnam) Ninh Thuận Province	3,363.10	Province of Vietnam.
Northern Cyprus	3,355	De facto state compromising the Northern third of the island of Cyprus.
Uvs Lake	3,355	Lake in Mongolia.
Tartu County	3,349	County of Estonia.
(Latvia) Madona district	3,346	Second largest district of Latvia.
(Algeria) El Tarf Province	3,339	Province of Algeria.
(Hungary) Vas County	3,336	Third smallest county of Hungary.
(Russia) Vaygach Island	3,329	Island part of Russia.
(Turkey) Osmaniye Province	3,320	Province of Turkey.
(Czech Republic) Karlovy Vary Region	3,314.46	Second smallest region of the Czech Republic.
(New Zealand) Dunedin	3,314	Largest city (by area) in New Zealand.
(Vietnam) Sóc Trăng Province	3,312.30	Province of Vietnam.
(Serbia) Kosovo	3,310	District of Serbia that is ruled by the de facto state of the Republic of Kosovo.
(Qatar) Al-Shahaniya	3,309	Largest municipality of Qatar.
South Holland	3,308	Province of The Netherlands
(Thailand) Ranong Province	3,298	Province of Thailand.
(Mongolia) Darkhan-Uul	3,280	Second smallest aimag of Mongolia.
(Albania) Elbasan County	3,278	Third largest county of Albania.
(Rwanda) Northern Province	3,276	Province of Rwanda.
County Tyrone	3,270	Largest county in Northern Ireland, second largest county in the province of Ulster.
(Algeria) Béjaïa Province	3,268	Province of Algeria.
(Serbia) Mačva	3,268	District of Serbia.
(Philippines) Masbate Island	3,268	Island of the Philippines.
(Sicily) Messina Province	3,266.12	Province of Italy.
(Benin) Plateau Department	3,264	Department of Benin.
Aosta Valley	3,263	Smallest region of Italy.
(Serbia) Central Banat	3,256	District of Serbia.
(Ecuador) Bolívar Province	3,254	Second smallest province of Ecuador.
(Malawi) Ntcheu	3,251	District of Malawi.
(France) Rhône	3,249	Department of France.
(Province of Frosinone) Frosinone Province	3,247	Province of Italy.
(England) Wiltshire	3,246	Administrative county of England.
(Russia) Iturup	3,238	Largest island of the Kuril Islands, part of Russia.
(Province of Arezzo) Arezzo Province	3,233	Province of Italy.
(Benin) Atlantique Department	3,233	Department of Benin.
Windward Islands	3,232.5	Subsection of islands in the Lesser Antilles.
(Philippines) Kalinga	3,231.25	Province of the Philippines.
(Guatemala) Jutiapa	3,219	Department of Guatemala.
Vaud	3,212	Canton of Switzerland.
Lake Poyang	3,210	Lake in China.
(Honduras) Copán	3,203	Department of Honduras.
Micronesia	3,201	An island chain subdivision of Oceania.
Lake Tana	3,200	Lake in Ethiopia.
(England) Shropshire	3,197	Administrative county of England.
(Province of Sondrio) Sondrio Province	3,195.76	Province of Italy.
(Solomon Islands) Makira-Ulawa	3,188	Province of the Solomon Islands.
(Indonesia) Yogyakarta Special Region	3,186	Second smallest province of Indonesia.
(Sweden) Gotland	3,183.7	Province, county, municipality and diocese of Sweden.
(Metropolitan City of Reggio Calabria) Reggio Calabria Province	3,183	Province of Italy.
(Canada) Mansel Island	3,180	Island in the Arctic Archipelago.
(Czech Republic) Liberec Region	3,162.93	Smallest region of the Czech Republic.
(Thailand) Amnat Charoen Province	3,161	Province of Thailand.
(Algeria) Tissemsilt Province	3,152	Province of Algeria.
(Philippines) Aurora	3,147.32	Province of the Philippines.
Rhode Island	3,144	State of the United States.
(Sweden) Gotland County	3,140	Second smallest county of Sweden.
(Guinea-Bissau) Quinara	3,138.4	Region of Guinea-Bissau.
(Scotland) Eilean Siar	3,134	Island area of Scotland.
(Malawi) Mchinji	3,131	District of Malawi.
(Costa Rica) Cartago Province	3,125	Second smallest province of Costa Rica.
West Flanders	3,125	Province of Flanders, Belgium.
(Guatemala) Baja Verapaz	3,124	Department of Guatemala.
(Philippines) Batangas	3,119.72	Province of the Philippines.
Amadjuak Lake	3,115	Lake in Canada.
(Province of Verona) Verona Province	3,109	Province of Italy.
(Haiti) Grand'Anse	3,100	Department of Haiti.
(Indonesia) Yamdena	3,100	Island part of Indonesia.
(Denmark) Funen	3,099.7	Island part of Denmark.
County Antrim	3,086	Second largest county in Northern Ireland, third largest county in the province of Ulster.
(Malawi) Dowa	3,077	District of Malawi.
(Honduras) Intibucá	3,072	Department of Honduras.
(Bulgaria) Vidin Province	3,071	Province of Bulgaria.
Lake Melville	3,069	Lake in Canada.
(England) Cambridgeshire	3,067	Administrative county of England.
(Latvia) Cēsis district	3,067	Third largest district of Latvia.
(Indonesia) Waigeo	3,060	Island part of Indonesia.
(Croatia) City of Zagreb	3,060	County of Croatia.
(Latvia) Riga district	3,059	District of Latvia.
(Cuba) Ciudad de La Habana Province	3,053.49	Second smallest province of Cuba.
(Sicily) Agrigento Province	3,042	Province of Italy.
(Bulgaria) Kyustendil Province	3,027	Province of Bulgaria.
(Bhutan) Lhuntse	3,022	Third largest district of Bhutan.
(Serbia) Moravica	3,016	District of Serbia.
(Dominican Republic) La Altagracia	3,010.34	Second largest province of the Dominican Republic.
(Canada) Akimiski Island	3,001	Island in the Arctic Archipelago.
Lake Bangweulu	3,000	Lake in Zambia.

== See also ==
Other divisions

- 0.1 to 1,000,000+ square kilometers
- 1,000,000+ square kilometers

Smaller divisions

- 200,000+ square kilometers • 100,000 to 1,000,000 square kilometers • 50,000 to 200,000 square kilometers • 20,000 to 50,000 square kilometers
- 5,000 to 20,000 square kilometers • 1,000 to 5,000 square kilometers • 0.1 to 1,000 square kilometers
- 500,000 to 1,000,000 square kilometers • 200,000 to 500,000 square kilometers • 100,000 to 200,000 square kilometers
- 50,000 to 100,000 square kilometers • 30,000 to 50,000 square kilometers • 20,000 to 30,000 square kilometers • 10,000 to 20,000 square kilometers
- 7,000 to 10,000 square kilometers • 5,000 to 7,000 square kilometers • 3,000 to 5,000 square kilometers • 1,000 to 3,000 square kilometers
- 250 to 1,000 square kilometers • 50 to 250 square kilometers • Under 50 square kilometers

Other

- List of countries and dependencies by area
- List of largest empires
- List of administrative divisions by country
- Category:Ranked lists of country subdivisions
