= Tai Wan Village, Lamma Island =

Village of Hong Kong

Coordinates: 22.223756°N 114.116057°E

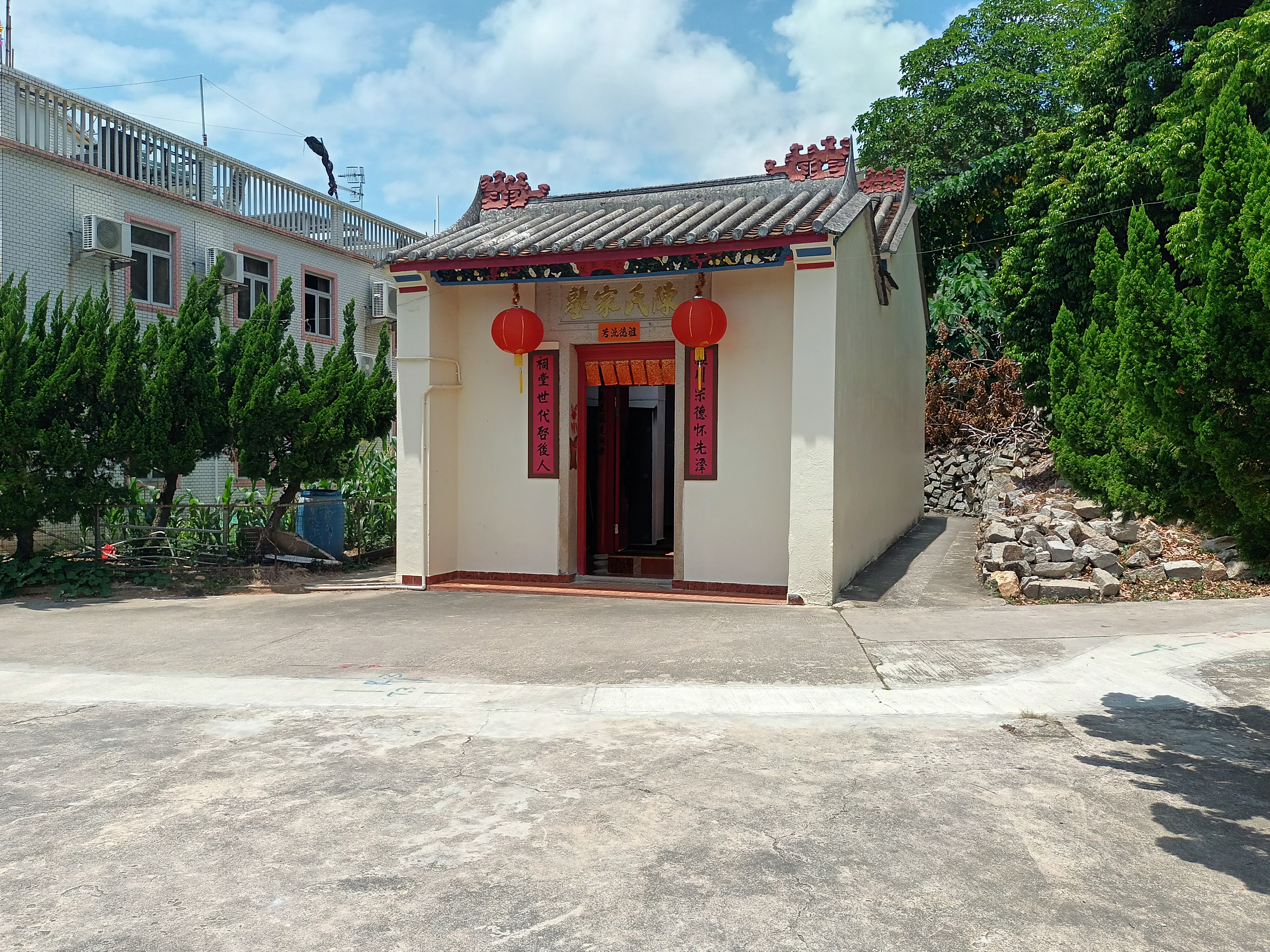
Chan Study Hall in Tai Wan San Tsuen.

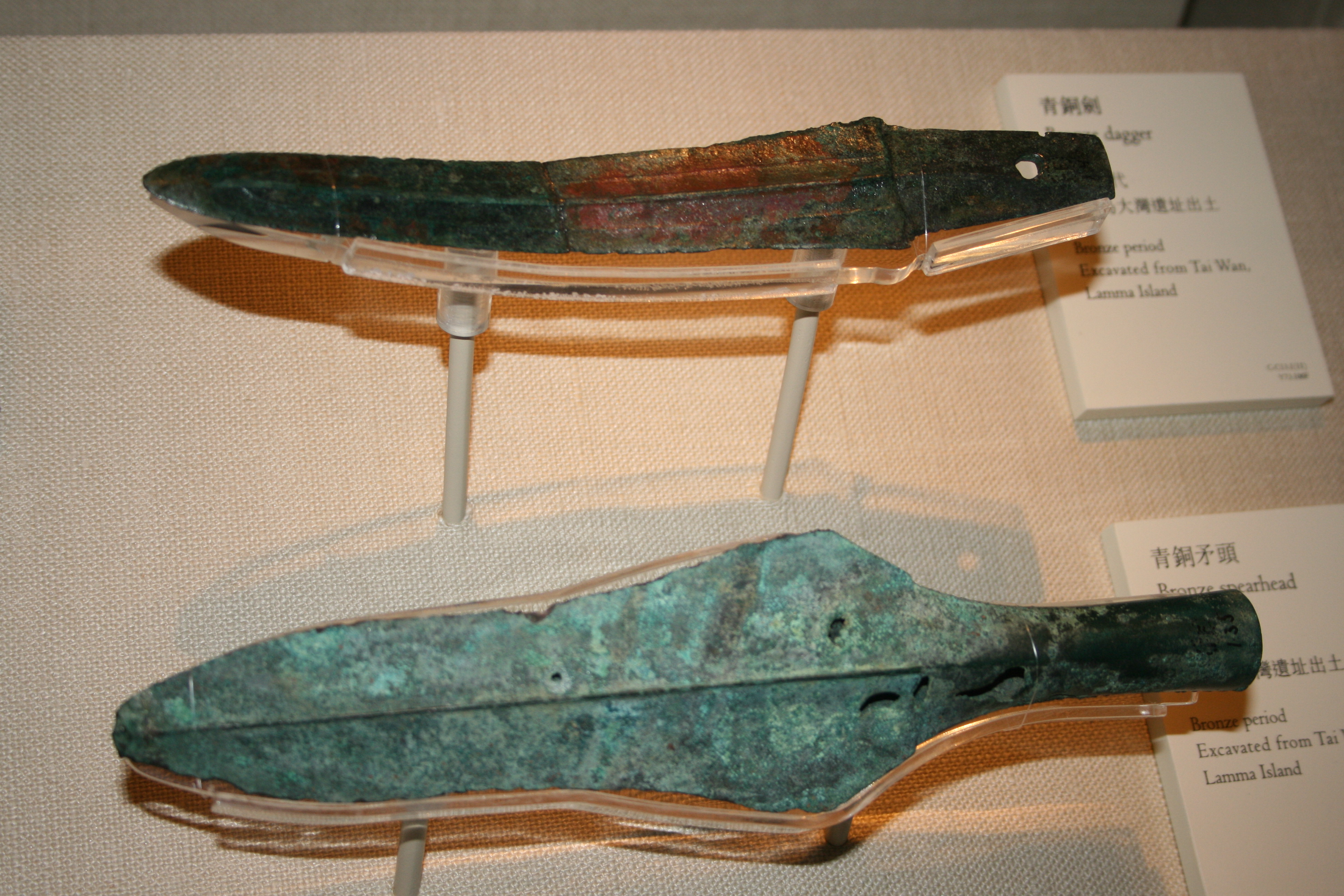
Bronze dagger and bronze spearhead from the Bronze Age. Excavated at Tai Wan and exhibited at the Hong Kong Museum of History.

Tai Wan Village (Chinese: 大灣村) is a village located in the area of Yung Shue Wan on the North side of Lamma Island, the third largest island in the territory of Hong Kong. It comprises the two settlements Tai Wan Kau Tsuen (大灣舊村; 'Tai Wan Old Village') and Tai Wan San Tsuen (大灣新村; 'Tai Wan New Village').

== Administration ==
Tai Wan Kau Tsuen and Tai Wan San Tsuen are recognized village under the New Territories Small House Policy.

== History ==
At the time of the 1911 census, the population of Tai Wan was 113. The number of males was 52.
