= Taiwan Province =

Taiwan (Republic of China province) is a division of the Republic of China, commonly known as Taiwan.

Taiwan Province may also refer to:

- Taiwan (People's Republic of China province), de jure province claimed by China
- Fujian–Taiwan Province of the Qing dynasty
  - Taiwan Prefecture, a prefecture of Fujian Province during the Qing dynasty

== See also ==
- Taiwan
- Taiwan under Japanese rule, when Taiwan was a colony of the Empire of Japan
- Taiwan (disambiguation)
