= Dennery District =

Quarter and town in St. Lucia

Dennery
- District
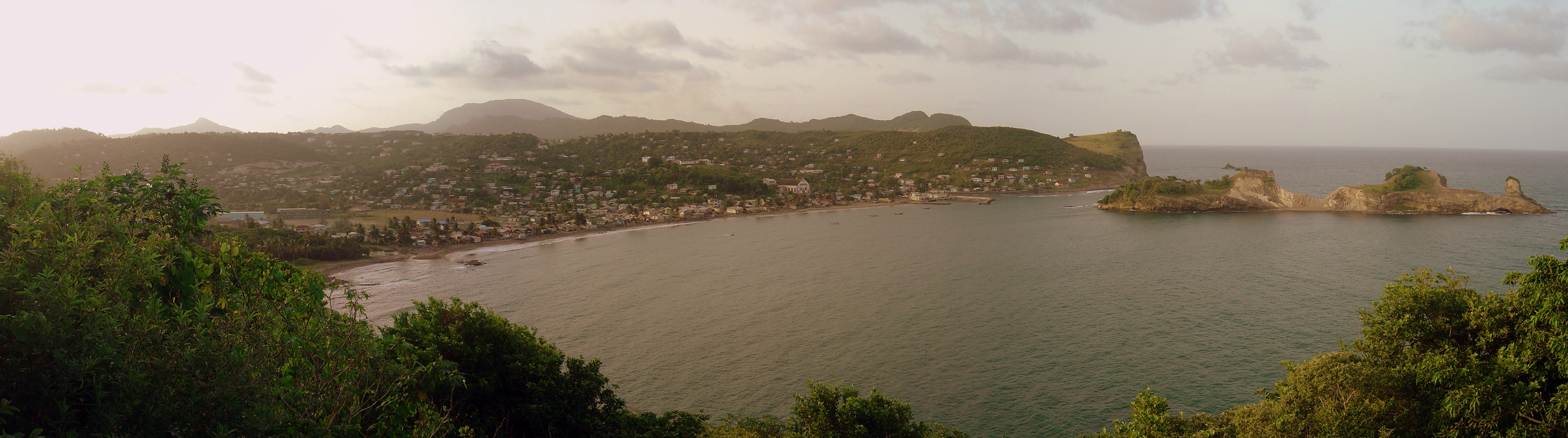
- View of Dennery Bay

- Location of Dennery District within Saint Lucia
- Coordinates: 13.91409°N 60.89132°W
- Country: St. Lucia

Area
  - Total: 72.3 km^{2} (27.9 sq mi)

Population (2010)
  - Total: 12,767
  - Density: 177/km^{2} (460/sq mi)
- ISO 3166-2:LC: LC-05

Dennery District is one of 10 districts (formerly Quarters) of the Caribbean island nation of Saint Lucia. The seat of Dennery District is the Dennery Village. The main economic activities are fishing, and the cultivation of lima beans, bananas, and other tropical fruit. The population of the quarter was estimated at 12,876 in 2002 and fell to 12,767 in 2010.

== History ==
Dennery District (formerly Quarter) was previously known as Anse Canot (Bay of canoes) and Le Grand Mabouya. It was then named after Count d'Ennery, an author who wrote about Saint Lucia in 1765 and 1767 and later became Governor-General of the Windward Islands from 1766 to 1770.

== Geography ==
The Dennery District is divided into 49 second-order administrative divisions.

Much of Dennery District is in Mabouya Valley which is made up of Derniere Riviere, Aux Lyon, Despinoze, Gadette, Grand Riviere, Grand Ravine, La Ressource, Richfond and other surrounding areas; and Frigate Island Nature Reserve is offshore a few kilometers to the south of the town.

Other locations in the Dennery District:

- Anse Galet (bay), 13°53′27″N 60°52′52″W
- Anse Louvet (bay), 13°57′47″N 60°52′39″W
- Anse Povert (bay), 13°56′35″N 60°52′35″W
- Aux Lyon (mountain), 13°57′16″N 60°54′20″W
- Aux Lyon (town), 13°56′45″N 60°54′28″W
- Barra Estate, 13°56′47″N 60°55′22″W
- Des Bateaux Island, 13°55′01″N 60°52′44″W
- Dennery Bay, 13°54′26″N 60°53′10″W
- Dennery Island, 13°54′32″N 60°53′03″W
- Dennery Waterworks Forest Reserve, 13°53′30″N 60°55′05″W
- Dernière Rivière, 13°57′14″N 60°55′28″W (town)
- Dennery Village, 13°54′40″N 60°53′28″W
- Dennery River, 13°54′30″N 60°53′26″W
- Errard Estate, 13°53′43″N 60°56′01″W
- Fond d'Or Bay, 13°55′19″N 60°53′10″W (mouth)
- Fond d'Or River, 13°55′23″N 60°53′25″W
- Grande Rivière du Mabouya, 13°56′10″N 60°54′31″W
- Mount La Combe, 13°54′51″N 60°57′30″W, elevation: 419 m (1,375 ft)
- Piton Canarie (mountain), 13°51′19″N 61°01′01″W, elevation: 632 m (2,073 ft)
- Sault Falls, Located a few miles inland from Dennery, it is a 20m high waterfall on the Dennery River.
- Rouche Island, 13°57′12″N 60°52′28″W
- Saint Joseph Estate, 13°54′10″N 60°55′04″W
- Frigate Island Nature Reserve, Operated by the Saint Lucia National Trust, it is a breeding area for seabirds. (13°52′46″N 60°53′01″W, now located in Micoud District)

== Events ==
The Dennery village hosts an event every Saturday from 4:00pm to 2:00am known as the Dennery Fish Fiesta where tourists and locals to sample various local cuisine based primarily on seafood especially fish. During the Lenten season the activity is closed. Fresh seafood, bakes, rum punch and Piton is served from stalls. There is a live DJ, also.

== Government ==
The seat of the Dennery District is the town of Dennery.

The Dennery District is divided into two electoral constituencies represented in the House of Assembly of Saint Lucia.The electoral constituencies has been represented since July 2021 by Shawn A. Edward (Dennery North) and Paul Prospere (Dennery South) as Parliamentary Representatives. The district elected their representatives during the countries recent general election.

== See also ==
- Geography of Saint Lucia
- List of cities in Saint Lucia
- List of rivers of Saint Lucia
- Districts of Saint Lucia
