= Sault Falls =

Waterfall in Saint Lucia

Coordinates: 13°53′44″N 60°56′08″W

Sault Falls (also called Dennery Falls and Errard Falls) is a 15-to-20-metre (49 to 66 ft) high waterfall near Dennery in Saint Lucia.

== See also ==
- List of waterfalls
