= Venedikt =

Venedikt is a male given name, a variant of Benedikt.

- Venedikt Dzhelepov, Soviet physicist
- Venedikt Miakotin, Russian historian and politician
- Venedikt Kraljević
- Venedikt Yerofeyev, Russian writer and Soviet dissident
- Venedikt Yevladov, Russian orthodox priest and deputy of the Fourth Imperial Duma
