= List of political and geographic subdivisions by total area from 0.1 to 1,000 square kilometers =

This is one of a series of comprehensive lists of continents, countries, and first level administrative country subdivisions such as states, provinces, and territories, as well as certain political and geographic features of substantial area. References for the information provided in this table may be found in the individual articles on each body listed herein. Some divisions are listed twice, with one listing including territory that is excluded in the other for various reasons, including territorial disputes. There is intentional overlap among the lists in order to maximize ease of use.

Geographic entity	Area (km^{2})	Notes
(Netherlands) Dutch Caribbean	999	Dutch islands in the Caribbean. These include the constituent countries of the Kingdom of the Netherlands--Aruba, Curaçao and Sint Maarten, and the three special municipalities of Bonaire, Saba and Sint Eustatius.
(North Macedonia) Kavadarci	998	Municipality of North Macedonia.
Ștefan Vodă District	998	District of Moldova.
(Northern Cyprus) Gazimağusa	997	District of Northern Cyprus, which is internationally recognized as a part of Cyprus.
Thurgau	991	Canton of Switzerland.
(Bhutan) Punaka	977	Third smallest district of Bhutan.
(Scotland) Mainland (Shetland)	968.87	Largest island of Shetland, part of Scotland.
(Thailand) Ang Thong Province	968	Province of Thailand.
(South Korea) Incheon	965	Second largest metropolitan city of South Korea.
(Tuscany) Pistoia Province	964.12	Province of Italy.
São Tomé and Príncipe	964	Country in Africa.
Rîșcani District	936	District of Moldova.
(Philippines) Marinduque	952.58	Province of the Philippines.
New Territories	952	Biggest one of the three areas of Hong Kong.
Turks and Caicos Islands	948	British Overseas Territory in the West Indies. Area includes protected waters.
(Jordan) Madaba	940	Governorate of Jordan.
Edineț District	933	District of Moldova.
(Montenegro) Bijelo Polje	924	Municipality of Montenegro.
(Vietnam) Hưng Yên Province	923.5	Province of Vietnam.
Cimișlia District	923	District of Moldova.
County Dublin	922	County in the Leinster province of the Republic of Ireland.
(Vietnam) Hanoi (municipality)	921.8	Third smallest province of Vietnam.
(Province of Rimini) Rimini Province	921.77	Province of Italy.
(New Zealand) Chatham Island	920	Largest island of the Chatham Islands, part of New Zealand.
(Piedmont) Biella Province	913	Province of Italy.
Canton of Schwyz	908	Canton of Switzerland.
(Pakistan) Islamabad Capital Territory	906	Smallest province of Pakistan.
Luxembourg	904	District of Luxembourg.
(Montenegro) Cetinje	899	Municipality of Montenegro.
Kathmandu	899	Capital and largest city of Nepal.
(Trinidad and Tobago) Sangre Grande region	898.94	Largest region of Trinidad and Tobago.
County Carlow	897	County in the Leinster province of the Republic of Ireland.
(Montenegro) Kolašin	897	Municipality of Montenegro.
(Solomon Islands) Temotu Province	895	Third smallest province of the Solomon Islands.
Anenii Noi District	892	District of Moldova.
Berlin	892	City-state of Germany.
(South Korea) Daegu	886	Third largest metropolitan city of South Korea.
(El Salvador) San Salvador	886	Second smallest department of El Salvador.
(United Kingdom) Newry and Mourne	886	Third largest district of Northern Ireland.
(Scotland) North Ayrshire	884	Unitary district of Scotland.
(Vanuatu) Torba Province	882	Smallest province of Vanuatu.
(Province of La Spezia) La Spezia Province	881	Province of Italy.
(French Polynesia) Tuamotu-Gambier Islands	881	Administrative subdivision of French Polynesia.
Virgin Islands	877.6	Archipelago of islands in the Greater Antilles, consists of the Spanish Virgin Islands, British Virgin Islands and the United States Virgin Islands.
(North Macedonia) Makedonski Brod	875	Municipality of North Macedonia.
(Jamaica) Trelawny Parish	874.6	Parish of Jamaica.
(Transnistria) Slobozia	873.24	District of Transnistria, a breakaway republic recognized as a part of Moldova.
(Thailand) Samut Sakhon Province	872	Province of Thailand.
(Zimbabwe) Harare	872	Independent city of Zimbabwe.
Cantemir District	870	District of Moldova.
(Timor-Leste) Ainaro	869.8	Municipality of East Timor.
(Cambodia) City of Sihanoukville	868	Self-governing city of Cambodia.
Sevastopol City	864	Independent city of Ukraine second smallest political subdivision of Ukraine, currently controlled by Russia (Not recognized internationally as a part of Russia).
(Marche) Fermo Province	862	Province of Italy.
(United Kingdom) Strabane	861	District of Northern Ireland.
(Vietnam) Hà Nam Province	859.7	Second smallest province of Vietnam.
(Qatar) Al Shamal	859	Municipality of Qatar.
(São Tomé and Príncipe) São Tomé Province	859	Province of São Tomé and Príncipe.
(North Macedonia) Mavrovo and Rostuša	856	Municipality of North Macedonia.
(Israel) Haifa District	854	Third smallest District of Israel.
(Montenegro) Plužine	854	Municipality of Montenegro.
(Tanzania) Zanzibar Central/South	854	Region of Tanzania.
(Trinidad and Tobago) Rio Claro–Mayaro	852.81	Second largest region of Trinidad and Tobago.
(Wales) Monmouthshire	851	Unitary authority of Wales.
(Transnistria) Rîbnița	850.2	District of Transnistria, a breakaway republic recognized as a part of Moldova.
Telenești District	849	District of Moldova.
(Wales) Denbighshire	844	Unitary authority of Wales.
(Palestine) Ramallah and al-Bireh	844	Governorate of Palestine.
(Burundi) Mwaro Province	840	Third smallest province of Burundi.
(Mongolia) Orkhon Province	840	Smallest aimag of Mongolia.
Kyiv Oblast	839	Independent city of Ukraine; smallest political subdivision of Ukraine.
(Guinea-Bissau) Biombo	838.8	Region of Guinea-Bissau.
Canton of Jura	838	Canton of Switzerland.
(North Macedonia) Kičevo	838	Municipality of North Macedonia.
(England) North Lincolnshire	833	Unitary authority of England.
(Jamaica) Manchester Parish	830.1	Parish of Jamaica.
Southern Peninsula (Iceland)	829	Smallest region of Iceland.
Madeira	828	Autonomous Region of Portugal.
(Albania) Durrës County	827	Second smallest county of Albania.
County Louth	826	County in the Leinster province of the Republic of Ireland. Smallest of Ireland's 32 traditional counties.
(Vietnam) Bắc Ninh Province	823.1	Smallest province of Vietnam.
(Thailand) Sing Buri Province	823	Province of Thailand.
(Transnistria) Grigoriopol	822	District of Transnistria, a breakaway republic recognized as a part of Moldova.
(Brazil) Serraria Island	818	Island part of Brazil.
Briceni District	814	District of Moldova.
(Jamaica) Portland Parish	814	Parish of Jamaica.
Oecusse-Ambeno	813.6	Exclave special administrative region of East Timor.
Perlis	810	Smallest state of Malaysia.
(Algeria) Algiers Province	809	Province of Algeria.
(Jamaica) Westmoreland Parish	807	Parish of Jamaica.
(Lombardy) Lecco Province	805.61	Province of Italy.
Canton of Neuchâtel	803	Canton of Switzerland.
(Cambodia) City of Pailin	803	Self-governing city of Cambodia.
Netherlands Antilles	800	Country in Caribbean. Self-governing part of the Kingdom of the Netherlands. Includes Bonaire, Curaçao, Saba, Sint Eustatius, and Sint Maarten (Dutch part of the island of Saint Martin).
Chatham Islands	793.88	Island group of New Zealand (land area).
Canton of Solothurn	791	Canton of Switzerland.
(North Macedonia) Bitola	790	Municipality of North Macedonia.
Ialoveni District	783	District of Moldova.
(Province of Lodi) Lodi Province	782.99	Province of Italy.
(Emirate of Umm Al Quwain) Umm al-Quwain	777	Second smallest emirate of the United Arab Emirates.
(Equatorial Guinea) Bioko Norte	776	Province of Equatorial Guinea.
(Panama) Kuna de Wargandí	775	Smallest province of Panama.
Leova District	775	District of Moldova.
(Northern Cyprus) İskele	774	District of Northern Cyprus, which is internationally recognized as a part of Cyprus.
(Timor-Leste) Ermera	770.8	Municipality of East Timor.
New Zealand Subantarctic Islands	764.64	The five southernmost groups of the New Zealand outlying islands. Includes the Auckland Islands, Campbell Islands, Bounty Islands, Antipodes Islands and The Snares.
(United Kingdom) Dungannon	763	District of Northern Ireland.
(Malawi) Chiradzulu	761	District of Malawi.
(South Korea) Busan	760	Metropolitan city of South Korea.
(Yemen) 'Adan Governorate	760	Smallest governorate of Yemen.
(Azores) São Miguel Island	759	Largest island of the Azores, part of Portugal.
(El Salvador) Cuscatlán	756	Smallest department of El Salvador.
(Malawi) Mwanza	756	District of Malawi.
Hamburg	755	City-state of Germany.
(North Macedonia) Novaci	755	Municipality of North Macedonia.
Glodeni District	754	District of Moldova.
Călărași District	753	District of Moldova.
(North Korea) Namp'o-si	753	Special city of North Korea.
Dominica	751	Country in the Caribbean.
Tonga	747	Country in Oceania.
(Jamaica) Saint Thomas Parish	742.8	Parish of Jamaica.
Madeira Island	740.7	Largest island of Madeira, part of Portugal.
Free Territory of Trieste	738	Former European nation from 1947-1975.
Republic of Indian Stream	731	Unrecognized, constitutional republic in North America, 1832–1835.
(Rwanda) Kigali	730	Capital city and province-level unit of Rwanda.
Strășeni District	730	District of Moldova.
(Croatia) Međimurje	729	Second smallest county of Croatia.
(North Macedonia) Čaška	727	Municipality of North Macedonia.
Kiribati	726	Country in Oceania. Includes three island groups - Gilbert Islands, Line Islands, Phoenix Islands.
(Trinidad and Tobago) Couva–Tabaquite–Talparo	719.64	Region of Trinidad and Tobago.
(Wales) Anglesey	719	Unitary authority of Wales.
(Albania) Lezhë County	714	Smallest county of Albania.
(Canary Islands) La Palma	708.32	Third-smallest of the main islands of the Canary Islands, part of Spain.
(England) West Berkshire	704	Unitary authority of England.
Federated States of Micronesia	702	Country in Oceania. Includes Pohnpei (Ponape), Chuuk (Truk) Islands, Yap Islands, and Kosrae (Kosaie).
(Burundi) Muramvya Province	696	Second smallest province of Burundi.
Bahrain	694	Country in Middle East.
(Northern Cyprus) Girne	690	District of Northern Cyprus, which is internationally recognized as a part of Cyprus.
Criuleni District	688	District of Moldova.
Canton of Glarus	685	Canton of Switzerland.
(Kenya) Nairobi Province	684	Smallest Province of Kenya.
Singapore	683	Country in Asia. UN figure is as of 2004. Official area in 2006 is 704 km^{2}.
(Egypt) Aswan Governorate	679	Governorate of Egypt.
(Scotland) East Lothian	678	Unitary district of Scotland.
(Timor-Leste) Aileu	676	Municipality of East Timor.
Taraclia District	674	District of Moldova.
(Turkey) Yalova Province	674	Smallest province of Turkey.
(Solomon Islands) Rennell and Bellona Province	671	Second smallest province of the Solomon Islands.
(Niger) Niamey Department	670	Smallest department of Niger.
(United Kingdom) Armagh	667	District of Northern Ireland.
(Indonesia) Jakarta Special Capital Region	662	Smallest province of Indonesia.
(Province of Ravenna) Ravenna	653	Second largest municipality of Italy.
Dondușeni District	645	District of Moldova.
(Palestine) Bethlehem	644	Governorate of Palestine.
(Cyprus) (Northern Cyprus) Kyrenia	643.9	District of Cyprus, but entirely ruled by Northern Cyprus.
(Bhutan) Tsirang	641	Second smallest district of Bhutan.
(Croatia) Zagreb County (Grad Zagreb)	641	Smallest county of Croatia.
(United Kingdom) Down	638	District of Northern Ireland.
(United Kingdom) Ballymena	634	District of Northern Ireland.
Aran	633.5	Autonomous administrative entity in Spain.
Nisporeni District	630	District of Moldova.
(Israel) Jerusalem District	627	Second smallest District of Israel.
(Thailand) Nongbua Lamphu Province	622	Third smallest province of Thailand.
(Trinidad and Tobago) Princes Town region	621.35	Region of Trinidad and Tobago.
Rezina District	621	District of Moldova.
(Philippines) Metro Manila	616.28	Municipality of the Philippines.
(Solomon Islands) Central Province	615	Smallest province of the Solomon Islands.
(Nicaragua) Masaya	611	Smallest region of Nicaragua.
(Jamaica) Saint Mary Parish	610.5	Parish of Jamaica.
(France) Territoire de Belfort	609	Department of France.
(Palestine) Jericho	608	Governorate of Palestine.
(South Korea) Seoul	606	Capital metropolitan city of South Korea.
(Philippines) Guimaras	604.57	Province of the Philippines.
(Mozambique) Maputo City	602	Capital city province of Mozambique.
(Philippines) Babuyan Islands	600	Archipelago in the northern Philippines.
(Montenegro) Bar	598	Municipality of Montenegro.
Șoldănești District	598	District of Moldova.
(North Macedonia) Berovo	597	Municipality of North Macedonia.
Ocnița District	597	District of Moldova.
(Jamaica) Saint James Parish	594.9	Parish of Jamaica.
(Apulia) Cerignola	593.92	Third largest municipality of Italy.
(Palestine) Nablus	592	Governorate of Palestine.
(Egypt) Damietta Governorate	589	Governorate of Egypt.
(United Kingdom) Limavady	585	District of Northern Ireland.
(Palestine) Jenin	583	Governorate of Palestine.
(North Macedonia) Štip	583	Municipality of North Macedonia.
(England) Doncaster	581	Metropolitan borough of England.
(Tanzania) Pemba North	574	Region of Tanzania.
Isle of Man	572	Crown dependency of the UK.
Brunei-Muara	571	District of Brunei.
Chișinău	563	District-level municipality of Moldova.
(United Kingdom) Magherafelt	562	District of Northern Ireland.
(England) Leeds	562	Metropolitan borough (city) of England.
(Sierra Leone) Western Area	557	Smallest first level subdivision of Sierra Leone.
Kočevje	555	Municipality of Slovenia.
(Montenegro) Šavnik	553	Municipality of Montenegro.
(Timor-Leste) Liquiçá	551	Municipality of East Timor.
(Senegal) Dakar Region	550	Smallest region of Senegal.
Guam	549	Country in Organized unincorporated territory of the USA.
(North Macedonia) Resen	549	Municipality of North Macedonia.
(Montenegro) Berane	544	Municipality of Montenegro.
(Thailand) Phuket Province	543	Second smallest province of Thailand.
Guam	541	Territory of the United States.
(South Korea) Daejeon	540	Second smallest metropolitan city of South Korea.
Saint Lucia	539	Country in the Caribbean.
(Philippines) Biliran	536.01	Province of the Philippines.
(Ethiopia) Addis Ababa	530	Chartered city region of Ethiopia.
(Uruguay) Montevideo Department	530	Smallest department of Uruguay.
(Trinidad and Tobago) Tunapuna–Piarco	527.23	Region of Trinidad and Tobago.
(Luxembourg) Grevenmacher	525	Smallest district of Luxembourg.
(Myanmar) Yangon Region	521	Smallest region of Myanmar (Myanmar has certain administrative divisions titled as Regions, and others titled as States).
(Bhutan) Pemagatshel	518	Smallest district of Bhutan.
Basel-Landschaft	518	Canton of Switzerland.
(North Macedonia) Veles	518	Municipality of North Macedonia.
(North Macedonia) Staro Nagoričane	515	Municipality of North Macedonia.
(Northern Cyprus) Lefkoşa	513	District of Northern Cyprus, which is internationally recognized as a part of Cyprus.
(United Kingdom) Cookstown	512	District of Northern Ireland.
(Trinidad and Tobago) Siparia region	510.48	Region of Trinidad and Tobago.
(North Macedonia) Radoviš	502	Municipality of North Macedonia.
(Montenegro) Danilovgrad	501	Municipality of Montenegro.
(South Korea) Gwangju	501	Smallest metropolitan city of South Korea.
(Wales) Wrexham	499	Unitary authority of Wales.
(Quebec) Region of Montreal	498	Region of Quebec
(England) South Gloucestershire	497	Unitary authority of England.
(Czech Republic) Prague	496	Capital city of the Czech Republic;has regional status.
(United Kingdom) Moyle	494	District of Northern Ireland.
(Bosnia and Herzegovina) Brčko District	493	Administrative unit of Bosnia and Herzegovina.
(India) Puducherry	492	Union Territory of India.
Obwalden	491	Canton of Switzerland.
(India) Dadra and Nagar Haveli	491	Union Territory of India.
(North Macedonia) Gevgelija	484	Municipality of North Macedonia.
(North Macedonia) Sveti Nikole	483	Municipality of North Macedonia.
(North Macedonia) Kriva Palanka	482	Municipality of North Macedonia.
(North Macedonia) Demir Hisar	480	Municipality of North Macedonia.
(Bahrain) Southern Governorate	480	Largest governorate of Bahrain.
Ilirska Bistrica	480	Municipality of Slovenia.
(Zimbabwe) Bulawayo	479	Independent city of Zimbabwe.
(United Kingdom) Coleraine	478	District of Northern Ireland.
Northern Mariana Islands	477	Territory of the United States.
(Province of Gorizia) Gorizia Province	475	Province of Italy.
(Scotland) North Lanarkshire	474	Unitary district of Scotland.
(Scotland) Small Isles	472	Archipelago part of Scotland.
(Tanzania) Zanzibar North	470	Region of Tanzania.
(North Macedonia) Struga	469	Municipality of North Macedonia.
Andorra	468	Country in Europe.
(Guatemala) Sacatepéquez	465	Smallest department of Guatemala.
Northern Mariana Islands	464	Commonwealth in political union with the USA. Includes 14 islands including Saipan, Rota, and Tinian.
Palau	459	Country in Oceania.
Fingal	456	Administrative county within the province of Leinster, in the Republic of Ireland.
Seychelles	455	Country in Africa.
(Norway) Oslo	454	County of Norway.
(Jamaica) Hanover Parish	450.4	Third smallest parish of Jamaica.
(Guinea) Conakry Region	450	Special Zone of Guinea.
(Azores) Pico Island	447	Second-largest island of the Azores, part of Portugal.
(Montenegro) Žabljak	445	Municipality of Montenegro.
Curaçao	444	Country in South America; self-governing part of the Kingdom of the Netherlands.
(New Zealand) Nelson	444	Unitary authority and smallest region of New Zealand.
(New Zealand) Auckland Island	442.5	Largest island of the Auckland Islands, part of New Zealand.
Antigua and Barbuda	442	Country in the Caribbean. Includes Redonda, 1.6 km^{2}.
(Wales) Neath Port Talbot	441	Unitary authority of Wales.
(United Kingdom) Banbridge	441	District of Northern Ireland.
(Wales) Flintshire	437	Unitary authority of Wales.
(United Kingdom) Lisburn	436	District of Northern Ireland.
(Transnistria) Camenca	434.5	District of Transnistria, a breakaway republic recognized as a part of Moldova.
Venezuelan Capital District (Distrito Capital)	433	Smallest state of Venezuela.
(Scotland) Isle of Arran	432.01	Largest island of the Islands of the Clyde, part of Scotland.
(North Macedonia) Kumanovo	432	Municipality of North Macedonia.
(Montenegro) Rožaje	432	Municipality of Montenegro.
(North Macedonia) Vinica	432	Municipality of North Macedonia.
(Jamaica) Saint Andrew Parish	430.7	Second smallest parish of Jamaica.
Barbados	430	Country in the Caribbean.
(Scotland) West Lothian	425	Unitary district of Scotland.
Anjouan	424	Autonomous island in the Comoros.
(Wales) Rhondda Cynon Taff	424	Unitary authority of Wales.
(North Macedonia) Debarca	423	Municipality of North Macedonia.
(North Macedonia) Delčevo	423	Municipality of North Macedonia.
(Jordan) Ajloun	420	Governorate of Jordan.
(North Macedonia) Dolneni	418	Municipality of North Macedonia.
(United Kingdom) Ballymoney	417	District of Northern Ireland.
(Thailand) Samut Songkhram Province	417	Smallest province of Thailand.
Vienna	415	Smallest state of Austria.
(North Macedonia) Negotino	414	Municipality of North Macedonia.
(Jordan) Jerash	410	Governorate of Jordan.
(England) Kirklees	410	Metropolitan borough of England.
(Province of Monza and Brianza) Monza and Brianza	405.55	Third smallest province of Italy.
(United Kingdom) Antrim	405	District of Northern Ireland.
(Bremen (state)) Free Hanseatic City of Bremen	404	Smallest city-state of Germany.
(Azores) Terceira Island	400.6	Third-largest island of the Azores, part of Portugal.
(French Polynesia) Leeward Islands	395	Second smallest administrative subdivision of French Polynesia.
Saint Helena, Ascension and Tristan da Cunha	394	British Overseas Territory.
(United Kingdom) Lough Neagh	392	Lake in Northern Ireland. Largest lake in Great Britain and Ireland.
(North Macedonia) Ohrid	392	Municipality of North Macedonia.
Saint Vincent and the Grenadines	388	Country in the Caribbean.
(England) Rutland	382	Unitary authority of England.
Federal Territory	381.65	Locally known as "Wilayah Persekutuan". Encompasses Kuala Lumpur, Labuan and Putrajaya.
Tolmin	381.5	Municipality of Slovenia.
(Transnistria) Dubăsari	381.2	District of Transnistria, a breakaway republic recognized as a part of Moldova.
(England) Isle of Wight	380.99	Unitary authority of England.
(Yemen) Sanaa	380	City-governorate of Yemen.
(Puerto Rico) Spanish Virgin Islands	378.2	Islands part of the Virgin Islands archipelago, part of Puerto Rico.
(Wales) Swansea	378	Unitary authority (city) of Wales.
(North Macedonia) Gostivar	375	Municipality of North Macedonia.
(North Macedonia) Kratovo	375	Municipality of North Macedonia.
(Dominican Republic) Lake Enriquillo	375	Lake of the Dominican Republic. It's the largest of the Hispañola and the Caribbean itself.
(England) North Somerset	375	Unitary authority of England.
(France) Mayotte	374	Overseas department of France.
(United Kingdom) Derry	373	District of Northern Ireland.
(Palestine) Tubas	372	Governorate of Palestine.
Lake Garda	369.98	Largest lake in Italy.
(Canary Islands) La Gomera	369.76	Second-smallest of the main islands of the Canary Islands, part of Spain.
Heard Island and McDonald Islands	368	Island of Australia.
(United Kingdom) Ards	368	District of Northern Ireland.
Bovec	367.3	Municipality of Slovenia.
(Montenegro) Mojkovac	367	Municipality of Montenegro.
(England) Sheffield	367	Metropolitan borough (city) of England.
(England) Bradford	366	Metropolitan borough (city) of England.
(Tuscany) Prato Province	365.5	Second smallest province of Italy.
(Palestine) Gaza Strip	365	Smaller one of the two territories of Palestine.
(England) Calderdale	363	Metropolitan borough of England.
(North Macedonia) Kočani	357	Municipality of North Macedonia.
(Scotland) Midlothian	356	Unitary district of Scotland.
(French Southern and Antarctic Lands) Crozet Islands	352	District of the French Southern and Antarctic Lands.
(England) Bath and North East Somerset	351	Unitary authority of England.
(Georgia (country)) Tbilisi	350	Capital region of Georgia.
United States Virgin Islands	347	Unincorporated, organized territory of the USA in the Caribbean.
Pohnpei	346	Largest state of the Federated States of Micronesia.
United Nations Buffer Zone in Cyprus	346	Demilitarised zone patrolled by the United Nations Peacekeeping Force in Cyprus to separate Cyprus and Northern Cyprus.
Grenada	344	Country in the Caribbean.
(Palestine) Quds	344	Governorate of Palestine.
(Saint Vincent and the Grenadines) Saint Vincent	344	Largest island of Saint Vincent and the Grenadines.
(Luxembourg) Clervaux	342.17	Largest canton of Luxembourg.
Federal Dependencies of Venezuela	342	Venezuela's off shore islands in the Caribbean Sea and the Gulf of Venezuela.
Črnomelj	339.7	Municipality of Slovenia.
(Philippines) Siquijor	337.49	Third smallest province of the Philippines.
(Wales) Vale of Glamorgan	337	Unitary authority of Wales.
(United Kingdom) Larne	337	District of Northern Ireland.
(Cambodia) City of Kep	335.8	Self-governing city of Cambodia.
Bohinj	333.7	Municipality of Slovenia.
(England) Wakefield	333	Metropolitan borough (city) of England.
(England) Peterborough	333	Unitary authority of England.
(Tanzania) Pemba South	332	Region of Tanzania.
(North Macedonia) Valandovo	331	Municipality of North Macedonia.
(England) Barnsley	328	Metropolitan borough of England.
Caribbean Netherlands	328	The three special municipalities of the Netherlands in the Caribbean--Bonaire, Saba and Sint Eustatius.
(Montenegro) Plav	328	Municipality of Montenegro.
(Canada) Helena Island	326	Island in the Arctic Archipelago.
(North Macedonia) Probištip	326	Municipality of North Macedonia.
(Qatar) Umm Salal	318	Third smallest municipality of Qatar.
Malta	316	Country in Europe.
(North Macedonia) Demir Kapija	312	Municipality of North Macedonia.
(Ethiopia) Harari Region	311	Smallest region of Ethiopia.
(North Macedonia) Strumica	311	Municipality of North Macedonia.
(Latvia) Riga	307	Largest city of Latvia with separate status (not part of any district).
Dubăsari District	309	District of Moldova.
(England) Milton Keynes	309	Unitary authority of England.
City of Minsk	305.5	Capital and the largest city of Belarus.
Koper	304	Municipality of Slovenia.
(Japan) Izu Islands	301.56	Archipelago part of Japan.
(Trinidad and Tobago) Tobago	300	Autonomous Island of Trinidad and Tobago.
(Uzbekistan) Tashkent	300	Capital province and smallest province of Uzbekistan.
(Scotland) Falkirk	299	Unitary district of Scotland.
Novo Mesto	298.5	Municipality of Slovenia.
Maldives	298	Country in Asia.
Canton of Schaffhausen	298	Canton of Switzerland.
Basarabeasca District	295	Smallest non-municipality district of Moldova.
Bonaire	294	Special municipality of the Kingdom of the Netherlands.
Idrija	293.7	Municipality of Slovenia.
(North Macedonia) Gradsko	291	Municipality of North Macedonia.
(South Africa) Marion Island	290	Sub-antarctic territory of South Africa
(Cambodia) City of Phnom Penh	290	Self-governing city of Cambodia.
(England) Telford and Wrekin	290	Unitary authority of England.
(Qatar) Al Daayen	290	Second smallest municipality of Qatar.
Krško	286.5	Municipality of Slovenia.
(Montenegro) Andrijevica	283	Municipality of Montenegro.
(England) Rotherham	283	Metropolitan borough of England.
Canton of Geneva	282	Canton of Switzerland.
Nova Gorica	280	Municipality of Slovenia.
(United Kingdom) Craigavon	280	District of Northern Ireland.
(Wales) Caerphilly	279	Unitary authority of Wales.
Nidwalden	276	Canton of Switzerland.
(North Macedonia) Studeniċani	276	Municipality of North Macedonia.
Ljubljana	275	The largest and capital city of Slovenia.
Sevnica	272.17	Municipality of Slovenia.
Taipei	271.8	Special municipality and capital of Taiwan.
(England) York	271	Unitary authority (city) of England.
(North Macedonia) Lipkovo	270	Municipality of North Macedonia.
Postojna	269.9	Municipality of Slovenia.
(Canary Islands) El Hierro	268.71	Smallest of the main islands of the Canary Islands, part of Spain.
Brežice	268.1	Municipality of Slovenia.
(Luxembourg) Redange	267.49	Second largest canton of Luxembourg.
(São Tomé and Príncipe) Caué	267	Largest district of São Tomé and Príncipe.
Kamnik	266	Municipality of Slovenia.
(England) Birmingham	265	Metropolitan borough (city) of England.
(Luxembourg) Wiltz	264.55	Third largest canton of Luxembourg.
Cayman Islands	264	British Overseas Territory.
(Scotland) Edinburgh	262	Unitary district (city) of Scotland.
(North Macedonia) Tetovo	262	Municipality of North Macedonia.
(Honduras) Islas de la Bahía	261	Smallest department of Honduras.
(Scotland) Renfrewshire	261	Unitary district of Scotland.
Saint Kitts and Nevis	261	Country in the Caribbean.
Slovenska Bistrica	260.1	Municipality of Slovenia.
Niue	260	Country in Oceania. Self-governing nation in free association with New Zealand.
(Emirate of Ajman) Ajman	259	Smallest emirate of the United Arab Emirates.
(North Macedonia) Novo Selo	257	Municipality of North Macedonia.
Kranjska Gore	256.3	Municipality of Slovenia.
(North Macedonia) Mogila	255	Municipality of North Macedonia.
(Montenegro) Ulcinj	255	Municipality of Montenegro.
(Mali) Bamako Capital District	252	Capital district of Mali.
Penal–Debe	246.91	Regional corporation of Trinidad and Tobago.
Bridgend	246	Unitary authority of Wales.
Val-de-Marne	245	Department of France.
Redcar and Cleveland	245	Unitary authority of England.
Appenzell Ausserrhoden	243	Canton of Switzerland.
Peter I Island	243	Norwegian claim to Antarctica.
Esch-sur-Alzette	242.77	Canton of Luxembourg.
Saint Pierre and Miquelon	242	French overseas collectivity in the North Atlantic Ocean. Includes eight small islands in the Saint Pierre and the Miquelon-Langlade groups.
National Capital District	240	Capital city of Papua New Guinea; city with provincial status.
(North Macedonia) Rankovce	240	Municipality of North Macedonia.
Canton of Zug	239	Third smallest canton of Switzerland.
(Palestine) Tulkarm	239	Governorate of Palestine.
Luxembourg	238.46	Canton of Luxembourg.
Camiguin	237.95	Second smallest province of the Philippines.
Cook Islands	236	Country in Oceania. Self-governing in free association with New Zealand.
Seine-Saint-Denis	236	Third smallest department of France.
(Montenegro) Tuzi	236	Municipality of Montenegro.
(Montenegro) Herceg Novi	235	Municipality of Montenegro.
(North Macedonia) Konče	233	Municipality of North Macedonia.
(North Macedonia) Karbinci	231	Municipality of North Macedonia.
(North Macedonia) Vasilevo	231	Municipality of North Macedonia.
(North Macedonia) Saraj	230	Municipality of North Macedonia.
Zanzibar Urban/West Region	230	Smallest region of Tanzania.
Swindon	230	Unitary authority of England.
Lembá	229	Second largest district of São Tomé and Príncipe.
București (Bucharest)	228	Municipality of Romania. Bucharest is the smallest first level subdivision of Romania, and the only non-county subdivision.
Yerevan	227	City with provincial status in Armenia. Yerevan is the smallest first level subdivision of Armenia.
(Timor-Leste) Dili Municipality	224	Municipality of East Timor.
Elba	224	Third largest island of Italy.
Mersch	223.90	Canton of Luxembourg.
(North Macedonia) Sopište	223	Municipality of North Macedonia.
South Dublin	223	Administrative county within the province of Leinster, in the Republic of Ireland.
(North Macedonia) Petrovec	222	Municipality of North Macedonia.
San Juan–Laventille	220.39	Second smallest regional corporation of Trinidad and Tobago.
Batanes	219.01	Smallest province of the Philippines.
(Northern Cyprus) Güzelyurt	219	District of Northern Cyprus, which is internationally recognized as a part of Cyprus.
(North Macedonia) Čučer-Sandevo	215	Municipality of North Macedonia.
Cairo Governorate	214	Governorate of Egypt.
Yell	212.11	Second largest island of Shetland, part of Scotland.
Province of Trieste	212	Smallest province of Italy.
Grevenmacher	211.37	Canton of Luxembourg.
Mohéli	211	Smallest autonomous island in the Comoros.
Saint Croix	210	Second-largest island of the United States Virgin Islands.
(North Macedonia) Pehčevo	208	Municipality of North Macedonia.
Diekirch	204.51	Canton of Luxembourg.
(Kuwait) Farwaniya	204	Governorate of Kuwait.
Stockton-on-Tees	204	Unitary authority of England.
City of Buenos Aires	203	Federal district of Argentina.
Doha	202.7	Smallest municipality of Qatar.
West Region	201.3	Largest region of Singapore.
(North Macedonia) Želino	201	Municipality of North Macedonia.
Djibouti Region	200	Smallest region of Djibouti.
Wallis and Futuna	200	French overseas collectivity. Includes Île Uvéa (Wallis Island), Île Futuna (Futuna Island), Île Alofi, and 20 islets.
Capellen	199.21	Canton of Luxembourg.
American Samoa	199	Unorganized, unincorporated territory of the US in Oceania. Includes Rose Atoll and Swains Island.
Wigan	199	Metropolitan borough of England.
Channel Islands	198	Archipelago in the English Channel, consists of the British Crown dependencies of Guernsey and Jersey.
Windsor and Maidenhead	198	Unitary authority of England.
Darlington	197	Unitary authority of England.
Calayan Island	196	Largest island of the Babuyan Islands, part of the Philippines.
Aruba	193	Country in South America; self-governing part of the Kingdom of the Netherlands.
Medway	192	Unitary authority of England.
North East Lincolnshire	192	Unitary authority of England.
Newport	191	Unitary authority (city) of Wales.
Narva Reservoir	191	Reservoir in Europe between Estonia and Russia.
(Palestine) Salfit	191	Governorate of Palestine.
(North Macedonia) Kruševo	190	Municipality of North Macedonia.
(North Macedonia) Makedonska Kamenica	189	Municipality of North Macedonia.
Cork City	187	Local Authority in the Republic of Ireland.
Aberdeen City council area	186	Unitary district (city) of Scotland.
Echternach	185.54	Third smallest canton of Luxembourg.
Tristan da Cunha	184	Largest administrative area (Island Council) of Saint Helena, Ascension and Tristan da Cunha.
Osh	183	Second smallest province of Kyrgyzstan.
Islands	182.74	District in Hong Kong.
Marshall Islands	181	Country in Oceania. Includes the atolls of Bikini, Enewetak, Kwajalein, Majuro, Rongelap, and Utirik.
Saint Andrew Parish	179.9	Largest parish of Dominica.
Solihull	179	Metropolitan borough of England.
Wokingham	179	Unitary authority of England.
(Timor-Leste) Dili	178.62	Capital and largest city of East Timor.
(Washington, D.C.) Washington, District of Columbia	177	Capital District of the United States.
(North Macedonia) Zelenikovo	177	Municipality of North Macedonia.
Hauts-de-Seine	176	Second smallest department of France.
Warrington	176	Unitary authority of England.
(Kuwait) Asimah	175	Governorate of Kuwait.
Glasgow City council area	175	Unitary district (city) of Scotland.
Northern Governorate	175	Governorate of Bahrain.
(North Macedonia) Jegunovce	174	Municipality of North Macedonia.
Appenzell Innerrhoden	173	Second smallest canton of Switzerland.
East Renfrewshire	173	Unitary district of Scotland.
(Montenegro) Petnjica	173	Municipality of Montenegro.
East Dunbartonshire	172	Unitary district of Scotland.
Tel Aviv	170	Smallest District of Israel.
Bishkek	170	Smallest province of Kyrgyzstan.
Saint Kitts	168	Larger of the two main islands of Saint Kitts and Nevis.
Quezon City	166.2	Largest city in the Philippines.
Camiguin Island	166	Second-largest island of the Babuyan Islands, part of the Philippines.
(North Macedonia) Lozovo	166	Municipality of North Macedonia.
(North Macedonia) Brvenica	164	Municipality of North Macedonia.
Thurrock	164	Unitary authority of England.
(Palestine) Qalqilya	164	Governorate of Palestine.
Easter Island	163.6	Special territory of Chile.
Providenciales and West Caicos	163.6	Largest administrative district of the Turks and Caicos Islands.
(Northern Cyprus) Lefke	162	District of Northern Cyprus, which is internationally recognized as a part of Cyprus.
West Dunbartonshire	162	Tie for third smallest unitary district of Scotland.
Inverclyde	162	Tie for third smallest unitary district of Scotland.
Brussels-Capital Region	161	Region of Belgium.
Barbuda	160.58	Dependency of Antigua and Barbuda.
Rochdale	160	Metropolitan borough of England.
Liechtenstein	160	Smallest doubly landlocked country of the world.
Wirral	159	Metropolitan borough of England.
Mahé	157.3	Largest island of the Seychelles.
Clackmannanshire	157	Second smallest unitary district of Scotland.
(Montenegro) Gusinje	157	Municipality of Montenegro.
(North Macedonia) Vrapčište	157	Municipality of North Macedonia.
Northern Islands Municipality	154.76	Largest municipality of the Northern Mariana Islands.
Sefton	153	Metropolitan borough of England.
(Montenegro) Zeta	153	Municipality of Montenegro.
Newtownabbey	151	District of Northern Ireland.
British Virgin Islands	151	British Overseas Territory; comprises 16 inhabited and more than 20 uninhabited islands. Includes the island of Anegada.
Calamba	149.5	1st class city in the province of Laguna, Philippines.
Charlotte Parish	149	Largest parish of Saint Vincent and the Grenadines.
Tai Po	148.19	District in Hong Kong.
(Republic of Ireland) Achill	148	Island in County Mayo, Republic of Ireland. The largest island off Ireland's coast.
Austral Islands	148	Smallest administrative subdivision of French Polynesia.
Lantau Island	147.16	Largest island in Hong Kong.
Callao Region	147	Smallest region of Peru.
Bajo Nuevo Bank	145	Disputed island in the Caribbean claimed by the United States, Nicaragua and Jamaica, and administered by Colombia.
Nukufetau (total area)	145	Atoll of Tuvalu.
North Caicos	144.9	Second largest administrative district of the Turks and Caicos Islands.
Middle Caicos	144.2	Administrative district of the Turks and Caicos Islands.
Chandigarh	144	Union Territory of India.
(North Macedonia) Bosilovo	143	Municipality of North Macedonia.
Gateshead	143	Metropolitan borough of England.
Príncipe Province	142	Third biggest district of São Tomé and Príncipe.
(North Macedonia) Bogovinje	141	Municipality of North Macedonia.
Oldham	141	Metropolitan borough of England.
(Timor-Leste) Atauro	140.5	Municipality of East Timor.
Bolton	140	Metropolitan borough of England.
Cardiff	139	Unitary authority (city) of Wales.
Yuen Long	138.56	District in Hong Kong.
North-East Region	138.1	Second largest region of Singapore.
Sunderland	138	Metropolitan borough (city) of England.
Blackburn with Darwen	137	Unitary authority of England.
(North Macedonia) Tearce	137	Municipality of North Macedonia.
South Caicos and East Caicos	136.8	Administrative district of the Turks and Caicos Islands.
North	136.51	District in Hong Kong
Sai Kung	136.34	District in Hong Kong.
Hoy	134.58	Second-largest island of Orkney, part of Scotland.
North Region	134.5	Region of Singapore.
(North Macedonia) Češinovo-Obleševo	133	Municipality of North Macedonia.
(North Macedonia) Rosoman	133	Municipality of North Macedonia.
Saint Helens	133	Metropolitan borough of England.
Central Region	132.7	Second smallest region of Singapore.
Sinuiju	132	A planned special administrative region of North Korea.
Dhekelia	130.8	UK military base on the island of Cyprus.
Belfast	130	District of Northern Ireland.
(North Macedonia) Dojran	129	Municipality of North Macedonia.
Remich	127.87	Second smallest canton of Luxembourg.
Diego Martin region	127.53	Smallest regional corporation of Trinidad and Tobago.
Chuuk	127	State of the Federated States of Micronesia.
Torfaen	126	Third smallest unitary authority of Wales.
Stockport	126	Metropolitan borough of England.
Dún Laoghaire–Rathdown	125.8	Administrative county within the province of Leinster, in the Republic of Ireland.
Saint David Parish	125.8	Second largest parish of Dominica.
Akrotiri	123	UK military base on the island of Cyprus.
Isle of Bute	122.17	Second largest island of the Islands of the Clyde, part of Scotland.
(Montenegro) Budva	122	Municipality of Montenegro.
Daman and Diu	122	Union Territory of India.
Saint Helena	122	Administrative area (Legislative Council) of Saint Helena, Ascension and Tristan da Cunha.
Mé-Zóchi	121	District of São Tomé and Príncipe.
Canillo	121	Largest parish of Andorra.
Unst	120.68	Third-largest island of Shetland, part of Scotland.
Cantagalo	119	Third smallest district of São Tomé and Príncipe.
Saint Joseph Parish	118.4	Third largest parish of Dominica.
Damascus	118	Smallest governorate of Syria.
Yap	118	State of the Federated States of Micronesia.
Dublin City	117.8	Local Authority in the Republic of Ireland.
Asunción Department	117	Smallest department of Paraguay.
Manchester	116	Metropolitan borough (city) of England.
Jersey	116	Crown dependency of the UK.
Saipan Municipality	115.38	Second largest municipality of the Northern Mariana Islands.
(North Macedonia) Bogdanci	114	Municipality of North Macedonia.
Liverpool	113	Metropolitan borough (city) of England.
Northern Region	112.9	Region of Malta.
Campbell Island / Motu Ihupuku	112.68	Largest island of the Campbell Islands, part of New Zealand.
Newcastle upon Tyne	112	Metropolitan borough (city) of England.
Merthyr Tydfil	111	Second smallest unitary authority of Wales.
East Region	110	Smallest region of Singapore.
Bristol	110	Unitary authority (city) of England.
Kosrae	110	Smallest state of the Federated States of Micronesia.
Blaenau Gwent	109	Smallest unitary authority of Wales.
Bracknell Forest	109	Unitary authority of England.
Tinian Municipality	108.11	Second smallest municipality of the Northern Mariana Islands.
(Palestine) Khan Yunis	108	Governorate of Palestine.
(North Macedonia) Centar Župa	107	Municipality of North Macedonia.
Walsall	106	Metropolitan borough of England.
Trafford	106	Metropolitan borough of England.
Paris	105	Smallest department of France.
Lobata	105	Second smallest district of São Tomé and Príncipe.
Distrito Nacional	104.4	Nacional District of the Dominican Republic.
(Kuwait) Mubarak Al-Kabeer	104	Governorate of Kuwait.
Tameside	103	Metropolitan borough of England.
Montserrat	102	British Overseas Territory.
Gros Islet	101	Largest district of Saint Lucia.
Brazzaville	100	Second smallest department of the Republic of the Congo.
Jūrmala	100	Second largest city of Latvia with separate status (not part of any district).
Bury	99	Metropolitan borough of England.
Saint Andrew Parish	99	Largest parish of Grenada.
Dudley	98	Metropolitan borough of England.
Salford	97	Metropolitan borough (city) of England.
Knowsley	97	Metropolitan borough of England.
(North Macedonia) Ilinden	97	Municipality of North Macedonia.
Coventry	97	Metropolitan borough (city) of England.
Santa Maria Island	96.89	Third-smallest island of the Azores, part of Portugal.
Poro Island	96.6	Largest island of the Camotes Islands, part of the Philippines.
Bender, Moldova (Tighina)	95	District-level municipality of Moldova.
Hartlepool	94	Unitary authority of England.
Nevis	93	Smaller of the two main islands of Saint Kitts and Nevis.
Stoke-on-Trent	93	Unitary authority (city) of England.
(North Macedonia) Gazi Baba	92	Municipality of North Macedonia.
Anguilla	91	British Overseas Territory.
Castries	90.33	Second largest district of Saint Lucia.
Ordino	89	Second largest parish of Andorra.
Saint Martin	88.4	Island in the Caribbean divided between Saint Martin, the French side, and Sint Maarten, the Dutch side.
(North Macedonia) Krivogaštani	88	Municipality of North Macedonia.
Ascension Island	88	Smallest administrative area (Island Council) of Saint Helena, Ascension and Tristan da Cunha.
Banjul	88	Capital city of The Gambia.
Tuen Mun	87.54	District in Hong Kong
Bujumbura Mairie	87	Smallest province of Burundi.
Manhattan	87	One of the five boroughs of New York City, New York, USA.
Saint Patrick Parish	86.7	Parish of Dominica.
Grenadines	86	Chain of islands in the Caribbean between Saint Vincent and Grenada.
Sandwell	86	Metropolitan borough of England.
Rota Municipality	85.39	Smallest municipality of the Northern Mariana Islands.
Carrickfergus	85	Third smallest district of Northern Ireland.
(North Macedonia) Debar	85	Municipality of North Macedonia.
(Kuwait) Hawalli	85	Governorate of Kuwait.
Castlereagh	84	Second smallest district of Northern Ireland.
North Tyneside	84	Metropolitan borough of England.
Saint Thomas	83	Largest island of the United States Virgin Islands.
Brighton and Hove	82	Unitary authority of England.
Plymouth	80	Unitary authority (city) of England.
Saint David Parish	80	Second largest parish of Saint Vincent and the Grenadines.
Littoral Department	79	Smallest department of Benin.
Southern Region	78.9	Region of Malta.
Hong Kong Island	78.59	Second largest island of Hong Kong, China, also one of the three areas of Hong Kong.
Vianden	78.59	Smallest canton of Luxembourg.
Bălți	78	District-level municipality of Moldova.
Derby	78	Unitary authority (city) of England.
Guernsey	78	Crown dependency of the UK. Includes Alderney, Guernsey, Herm, Sark, and some other smaller islands.
Micoud	78	Third largest district of Saint Lucia.
Bissau	77.5	Capital and autonomous sector of Guinea-Bissau.
Uvea	77.5	Largest chiefdom of Wallis and Futuna.
Nottingham	75	Unitary authority (city) of England.
Western District, American Samoa	74.781	District of American Samoa.
Halton	74	Unitary authority of England.
Encamp	74	Third largest parish of Andorra.
Leicester	73	Unitary authority (city) of England.
Daugavpils	72	Third largest city of Latvia with separate status (not part of any district).
North Down	72	Smallest district of Northern Ireland.
Port Said Governorate	72	Second smallest governorate of Egypt.
Kingston upon Hull	71	Unitary authority (city) of England.
Dennery	70	District of Saint Lucia.
(Palestine) Gaza	1,060	Governorate of Palestine.
Kentucky Bend	69.6	Exclave of Kentucky cut off by the Mississippi River, surrounded by Missouri and Tennessee.
Sha Tin	69.27	District in Hong Kong
Wolverhampton	69	Metropolitan borough (city) of England.
Gozo	68.7	Region of Malta.
Capital Governorate	68	Governorate of Bahrain.
(Australia) Jervis Bay Territory	67.8	Internal territory of Australia
Eastern District, American Samoa	67.027	District of American Samoa.
Bangui	67	Commune of the Central African Republic.
Kowloon	67	One of the three areas of Hong Kong.
Saint John Parish	66.96	Largest parish of Antigua and Barbuda.
Saint Paul Parish	66.4	Parish of Dominica.
Ngeremlengui	65	Largest state of Palau.
Dundee City council area	65	Smallest unitary district (city) of Scotland.
Poole	65	Unitary authority of England.
(Palestine) Rafah	65	Governorate of Palestine.
Saint George Parish	65	Second largest parish of Grenada.
South Tyneside	64	Metropolitan borough of England.
Saint Mary Parish	63.55	Second largest parish of Antigua and Barbuda.
(North Macedonia) Gjorče Petrov	63	Municipality of North Macedonia.
Torbay	63	Unitary authority of England.
Tsuen Wan	62.62	District in Hong Kong
Pitcairn Islands	62	British Overseas Territory in Oceania composed of several islands including Pitcairn Island.
Pitt Island	62	Second-largest island of the Chatham Islands, part of New Zealand.
(North Macedonia) Butel	61	Municipality of North Macedonia.
(Palestine) North Gaza	61	Governorate of Palestine.
San Marino	61	Country in Europe.
Amsterdam Island/Saint Paul Island	61	Second smallest district of the French Southern and Antarctic Lands.
La Massana	61	Parish of Andorra.
Graciosa Island	60.65	Second-smallest island of the Azores, part of Portugal.
Koror	60.52	Second largest state of Palau.
Jelgava	60	City of Latvia with separate status (not part of any district).
Liepāja	60	Third smallest city of Latvia with separate status (not part of any district).
Sant Julià de Lòria	60	Parish of Andorra.
Saint Philip	60	Largest parish of Barbados.
Chaguanas	59.65	Largest municipality of Trinidad and Tobago.
Saint John Parish	59.1	Parish of Dominica.
Galway City	57.3	Local Authority in the Republic of Ireland.
Muharraq Governorate	57	Smallest governorate of Bahrain.
Christ Church	57	Second largest parish of Barbados.
Manu'a	56.688	District of American Samoa.
Saint George Parish	56.2	Parish of Dominica.
(Palestine) Deir al-Balah	56	Governorate of Palestine.
Tortola	55.7	Largest district of the British Virgin Islands.
Miyake-jima	55.44	Third-largest island of the Izu Islands, part of Japan.
Luxor Governorate	55	Smallest governorate of Egypt.
Saint Martin	54.4	The French side of the divided island Saint Martin.
Middlesbrough	54	Unitary authority of England.
(North Macedonia) Plasnica	54	Municipality of North Macedonia.
Bermuda	53	Overseas territory of the UK in North America.
Ngardmau	53	Third largest state of Palau.
San Andrés and Providencia Department	52	Smallest department of Colombia.
Saint George Parish	52	Parish of Saint Vincent and the Grenadines.
Saint John	52	Third-largest island of the United States Virgin Islands.
Aimeliik	52	State of Palau.
(North Macedonia) Zrnovci	52	Municipality of North Macedonia.
Soufrière	50.51	District of Saint Lucia.
Sanday (Orkney)	50.43	Third-largest island of Orkney, part of Scotland.
Pointe-Noire	50	Smallest department of the Republic of the Congo.
Southampton	50	Unitary authority (city) of England.
United States Minor Outlying Islands	49.26	Statistical designation of groups of islands controlled by the United States in the Pacific Ocean.
Kungota	49	Municipality of Slovenia.
Šentrupert	49	Municipality of Slovenia.
Žiri	49	Municipality of Slovenia.
(Niue) Hakupu	48.04	Village of Niue.
Mirna Peč	48	Municipality of Slovenia.
Alo	47.5	Chiefdom of Wallis and Futuna.
Escaldes-Engordany	47	Parish of Andorra.
Ngatpang	47	State of Palau.
(Niue) Alofi North	46.48	Village of Niue.
(Niue) Alofi South	46.48	Village of Niue.
Bournemouth	46	Unitary authority of England.
(Montenegro) Tivat	46	Municipality of Montenegro.
Ventspils	46	Second smallest city of Latvia with separate status (not part of any district).
Podlehnik	46	Municipality of Slovenia.
Saint Paul Parish	45.27	Third largest parish of Antigua and Barbuda.
Guantanamo Bay	45	Island of Cuba under United States
Piran	45	Municipality of Slovenia. control.
Prince Edward Island	45	Sub-antarctic territory of South Africa.
Saint David Parish	44	Third largest parish of Grenada.
Airai	44	State of Palau.
Saint George	44	Third largest parish of Barbados.
Vieux Fort	43.77	District of Saint Lucia.
Luton	43	Unitary authority of England.
Grenadines Parish	43	Parish of Saint Vincent and the Grenadines.
(North Macedonia) Kisela Voda	43	Municipality of North Macedonia.
Nukulaelae (Total area)	43	Atoll and administrative district of Tuvalu.
City of Manila	42.88	Capital city of the Philippines.
Borovnica	42.3	Municipality of Slovenia.
Southend-on-Sea	42	Unitary authority of England.
Saint Patrick Parish	42	Parish of Grenada.
(Niue) Liku	41.64	Village of Niue.
Saint Philip Parish	40.67	Parish of Antigua and Barbuda.
Ngchesar	40	State of Palau.
Reading	40	Unitary authority of England.
Portsmouth	40	Unitary authority (city) of England.
Southern	39.4	District in Hong Kong
Saint Michael	39	Parish of Barbados.
Anegada	38.6	Second largest district of the British Virgin Islands.
Scattered Islands in the Indian Ocean	38.6	Smallest district of the French Southern and Antarctic Lands.
(North Macedonia) Aračinovo	38	Municipality of North Macedonia.
Laborie	38	District of Saint Lucia.
Carriacou and Petite Martinique	37.7	Dependency of Grenada.
Basel-Stadt	37	Smallest canton of Switzerland.
Saint Patrick Parish	37	Second smallest parish of Saint Vincent and the Grenadines.
South Eastern Region	36.2	Region of Malta.
Norfolk Island	36	Self-governing area of Australia.
Saint Andrew	36	Parish of Barbados.
Saint Lucy	36	Parish of Barbados.
Blackpool	35	Third smallest unitary authority of England.
Saint John Parish	35	Second smallest parish of Grenada.
(North Macedonia) Vevčani	35	Municipality of North Macedonia.
Tabor	35	Municipality of Slovenia.
Črenšovci	34	Municipality of Slovenia.
Destrnik	34	Municipality of Slovenia.
Polzela	34	Municipality of Slovenia.
Radenci	34	Municipality of Slovenia.
Starše	34	Municipality of Slovenia.
Šmarješke Toplice	34	Municipality of Slovenia.
Ngaraard	34	State of Palau.
Saint John	34	Tied for third smallest parish of Barbados.
Saint Peter	34	Tied for third smallest parish of Barbados.
Dol pri Ljubljani	33	Municipality of Slovenia.
Horjul	33	Municipality of Slovenia.
Oplotnica	33	Municipality of Slovenia.
Središče ob Dravi	33	Municipality of Slovenia.
Spanish possessions in North Africa	33	Possessions of Spain in North Africa.
Saint Peter Parish	32.6	Third smallest parish of Dominica.
Saint Peter Parish	32.37	Second smallest parish of Antigua and Barbuda.
Lakshadweep	32	Smallest union territory of India.
Saint James Windward Parish	32	Largest parish of Saint Kitts and Nevis.
Cirkulane	32	Municipality of Slovenia.
Dobrna	32	Municipality of Slovenia.
Bistrica ob Sotli	31.1	Municipality of Slovenia.
Anse la Raye	31	Second smallest district of Saint Lucia.
Choiseul	31	Second smallest district of Saint Lucia.
Cankova	31	Municipality of Slovenia.
Dobrovnik	31	Municipality of Slovenia.
Mirna	31	Municipality of Slovenia.
Sveti Jurij v Slovenskih Goricah	31	Municipality of Slovenia.
Vodice	31	Municipality of Slovenia.
Saint James	31	Second smallest parish of Barbados.
Markovci	30	Municipality of Slovenia.
Rečica ob Savinji	30	Municipality of Slovenia.
Renče-Vogrsko	30	Municipality of Slovenia.
Triesenberg	29.8	Largest municipality of Liechtenstein.
Saint Andrew Parish	29	Smallest parish of Saint Vincent and the Grenadines.
Gorišnica	29	Municipality of Slovenia.
Straža	29	Municipality of Slovenia.
Saint George Basseterre Parish	29	Second largest parish of Saint Kitts and Nevis.
Macau	28.6	Special administrative region of the People's Republic of China.
(Cook Islands) Avarua	28	A district and town of the Cook Islands.
Dornava	28	Municipality of Slovenia.
Naklo	28	Municipality of Slovenia.
Štore	28	Municipality of Slovenia.
Slough	27	Second smallest unitary authority of England.
Schaan	26.8	Second largest municipality of Liechtenstein.
Triesen	26.4	Third largest municipality of Liechtenstein.
(Niue) Mutalau	26.31	Village of Niue.
Pakri Islands	26.18	Islands part of Estonia.
Ngiwal	26	State of Palau.
Izola	26	Municipality of Slovenia.
Saint Joseph	26	Smallest parish of Barbados.
Mežica	26	Municipality of Slovenia.
Tuvalu	26	Country in Oceania.
Sveta Trojica v Slovenskih Goricah	26	Municipality of Slovenia.
Saint Mark Parish	25	Smallest parish of Grenada.
Saint John Capisterre Parish	25	Parish of Saint Kitts and Nevis.
Cerkvenjak	25	Municipality of Slovenia.
Saint George Parish	24.41	Smallest parish of Antigua and Barbuda.
Benedikt	24.1	Municipality of Slovenia.
Municipality of Komenda	24	Municipality of Slovenia.
Turnišče	24	Municipality of Slovenia.
Point Fortin	23.88	Second largest municipality of Trinidad and Tobago.
Little Sisters	23.7	Third largest district of the British Virgin Islands.
Central Region	23.6	Region of Malta.
Kwai Tsing	23.34	District in Hong Kong
Kuzma	23	Municipality of Slovenia.
Trnovska Vas	23	Municipality of Slovenia.
Peleliu	22.3	State of Palau.
Honiara	22	Capital territory of the Solomon Islands.
Hajdina	22	Municipality of Slovenia.
Mengeš	22	Municipality of Slovenia.
Saint John Figtree Parish	22	Parish of Saint Kitts and Nevis.
Nanumea (total area)	22	Atoll and administrative district of Tuvalu.
Kingston Parish	21.8	Smallest parish of Jamaica. The parish of Kingston does not encompass all of the city of Kingston, most of which is in the parish of St. Andrew.
(Niue) Lakepa	21.58	Village of Niue.
Virgin Gorda	21.2	Second smallest district of the British Virgin Islands.
(North Macedonia) Karpoš	21	Municipality of North Macedonia.
Nauru	21	Country in Oceania. Smallest republic in the world. Smallest independent Commonwealth state.
Saint Barthélemy	21	Overseas collectivity of France.
Saint Peter Basseterre Parish	21	Parish of Saint Kitts and Nevis.
Sint Eustatius	21	Special municipality of the Kingdom of the Netherlands.
(North Macedonia) Aerodrom	20	Municipality of North Macedonia.
(Malawi) Likoma	20	District of Malawi.
Kobilje	20	Municipality of Slovenia.
Balzers	19.6	Municipality of Liechtenstein.
Velika Polana	19	Municipality of Slovenia.
Zavrč	19	Municipality of Slovenia.
San Fernando City Corporation	18.64	Municipality of Trinidad and Tobago.
Šmartno ob Paki	18.2	Municipality of Slovenia.
Eastern	18.13	District in Hong Kong
Hodoš	18.1	Municipality of Slovenia.
Christ Church Nichola Town Parish	18	Parish of Saint Kitts and Nevis.
Saint George Gingerland Parish	18	Parish of Saint Kitts and Nevis.
Saint Thomas Lowland Parish	18	Parish of Saint Kitts and Nevis.
Sveti Andraž v Slovenskih Goricah	17.6	Municipality of Slovenia.
Grand Turk	17.6	Second smallest administrative district of the Turks and Caicos Islands.
Dobje	17.5	Municipality of Slovenia.
Vaduz	17.3	Municipality of Liechtenstein.
(Niue) Makefu	17.13	Village of Niue.
(Equatorial Guinea) Annobón	17	Province of Equatorial Guinea.
Rēzekne	17	Smallest city of Latvia with separate status (not part of any district).
Nui (Total area)	17	Atoll and administrative district of Tuvalu.
Sigave	16.75	Smallest chiefdom of Wallis and Futuna.
Água Grande	16.5	Smallest district of São Tomé and Príncipe.
Isles of Scilly	16.03	Smallest unitary authority of England.
Trinity Palmetto Point Parish	16	Parish of Saint Kitts and Nevis.
Canaries	16	Smallest district of Saint Lucia.
Saint Mary Cayon Parish	15	Parish of Saint Kitts and Nevis.
Saint Ouen Parish	15	Largest parish of Jersey.
Ailinglaplap Atoll	15	Atoll and administrative district of Marshall Islands.
Kwajalein Atoll	15	Atoll and administrative district of Marshall Islands.
Mili Atoll	15	Atoll and administrative district of Marshall Islands.
Šempeter-Vrtojba	15	Municipality of Slovenia.
Saint Paul Capisterre Parish	14	Parish of Saint Kitts and Nevis.
(Niue) Avatele	13.99	Village of Niue.
Wake Island	13.8	An atoll claimed by the Marshall Islands but administrated by the United States of America.
Saint Mark Parish	13.5	Second smallest parish of Dominica.
Port of Spain	13.45	Second smallest municipality of Trinidad and Tobago.
Saba	13	Special municipality of the Kingdom of the Netherlands.
Saint Anne Sandy Point Parish	13	Second smallest parish of Saint Kitts and Nevis.
Arno Atoll	13	Atoll and administrative district of Marshall Islands.
Saint Brélade Parish	12.8	Second largest parish of Jersey.
Central and Western	12.55	District in Hong Kong
(Niue) Tuapa	12.54	Village of Niue.
Miklavž na Dravskem polju	12.5	Municipality of Slovenia.
Trinity Parish	12.3	Third largest parish of Jersey.
Veržej	12	Municipality of Slovenia.
Andorra la Vella	12	Smallest parish of Andorra.
(Niue) Tamakautoga	11.93	Village of Niue.
Palmyra Atoll	11.9	An atoll which is a territory of the United States of America.
Saint Peter Parish	11.6	Parish of Jersey.
Kwun Tong	11.28	District in Hong Kong
Arima	11.15	Smallest municipality of Trinidad and Tobago.
Melekeok	11	State of Palau.
Log-Dragomer	11	Municipality of Slovenia.
Jaluit Atoll	11	Atoll and administrative district of Marshall Islands.
Tokelau	10.8	Territory of New Zealand.
Saint Luke Parish	10.8	Smallest parish of Dominica.
Wan Chai	10.64	District in Hong Kong
Saint Helier Parish	10.6	Parish of Jersey.
Serravalle (San Marino)	10.53	Largest municipality of San Marino.
Eschen	10.3	Municipality of Liechtenstein.
Saint Martin Parish	10.3	Parish of Jersey.
Castel Parish	10.2	Largest parish of Guernsey.
(Niue) Hikutavake	10.17	Village of Niue.
Kowloon City	10.02	District in Hong Kong
Ngarchelong	10	State of Palau.
Vaitupu	10	Atoll and administrative district of Tuvalu.
Likiep Atoll	10	Atoll and administrative district of Marshall Islands.
Majuro Atoll	10	Atoll and administrative district of Marshall Islands.
Maloelap Atoll	10	Atoll and administrative district of Marshall Islands.
Razkrižje	9.8	Municipality of Slovenia.
Saint Lawrence Parish	9.5	Parish of Jersey.
Sham Shui Po	9.36	District in Hong Kong
Saint Saviour Parish	9.3	Parish of Jersey.
Wong Tai Sin	9.3	District in Hong Kong
Salt Cay	9.1	Smallest administrative district of the Turks and Caicos Islands.
Borgo Maggiore	9.01	Second largest municipality of San Marino.
Vale Parish	8.9	Second largest parish of Guernsey.
Saint John Parish	8.7	Parish of Jersey.
Trzin	8.6	Municipality of Slovenia.
Jost Van Dyke	8.3	Smallest district of the British Virgin Islands.
Ankaran	8	Municipality of Slovenia.
Angaur	8	State of Palau.
Rongelap Atoll	8	Atoll and administrative district of Marshall Islands.
Wotje Atoll	8	Atoll and administrative district of Marshall Islands.
Grouville Parish	7.8	Third smallest parish of Jersey.
Faetano	7.75	Third largest municipality of San Marino.
Paracel Islands	7.75	Disputed islands in the South China Sea.
Coloane	7.6	One of the two largest parishes of Macau.
Taipa	7.6	One of the two largest parishes of Macau.
(North Macedonia) Centar	7.52	Municipality of North Macedonia.
Mauren	7.5	Municipality of Liechtenstein.
(North Macedonia) Šuto Orizari	7.48	Municipality of North Macedonia.
Ruggell	7.38	Municipality of Liechtenstein.
Saint Martin Parish	7.3	Third largest parish of Guernsey.
Ofu	7.215	Island of American Samoa.
City of San Marino	7.09	Municipality of San Marino.
Glorioso Islands	7	Scattered islands in the Indian Ocean, part of the French Southern and Antarctic Lands.
Pinnacle Islands	7	Group of uninhabited islands in the East China Sea, disputed by Japan, the People's Republic of China and the Republic of China.
Yau Tsim Mong	6.99	District in Hong Kong
Odranci	6.9	Municipality of Slovenia.
Gibraltar	6.8	British Overseas Territory.
Domagnano	6.62	Municipality of San Marino.
St. George's Parish, Bermuda	6.6	Largest parish of Bermuda.
Fiorentino	6.57	Municipality of San Marino.
Saint Mary Parish	6.5	Second smallest parish of Jersey.
Saint Peter Port Parish	6.5	Parish of Guernsey.
Saint Saviour Parish	6.4	Parish of Guernsey.
Midway Islands	6.2	Minor outlying island of the United States.
Saint Peter Parish	6.2	Parish of Guernsey.
Gamprin	6.1	Third smallest municipality of Liechtenstein.
Saint Sampson Parish	6	Parish of Guernsey.
Aur Atoll	6	Atoll and administrative district of Marshall Islands.
Ebon Atoll	6	Atoll and administrative district of Marshall Islands.
Enewetak Atoll	6	Atoll and administrative district of Marshall Islands.
Namu Atoll	6	Atoll and administrative district of Marshall Islands.
Clipperton Island	6	Only minor overseas territory of France.
Devonshire Parish	5.97	Tied for smallest parish of Bermuda.
Hamilton Parish	5.97	Tied for smallest parish of Bermuda.
Paget Parish	5.97	Tied for smallest parish of Bermuda.
Pembroke Parish	5.97	Tied for smallest parish of Bermuda.
Sandys Parish	5.97	Tied for smallest parish of Bermuda.
Smith's Parish	5.97	Tied for smallest parish of Bermuda.
Southampton Parish	5.97	Tied for smallest parish of Bermuda.
Warwick Parish	5.97	Tied for smallest parish of Bermuda.
Chiesanuova	5.46	Third smallest municipality of San Marino.
Navassa Island	5.4	An island administrated by the United States but claimed by Haiti.
(Niue) Vaiea	5.4	Village of Niue.
Planken	5.3	Second smallest municipality of Liechtenstein.
Ashmore and Cartier Islands	5	External territory of Australia.
Spratly Islands	5	Disputed islands in the South China Sea.
Ailuk Atoll	5	Atoll and administrative district of Marshall Islands.
Acquaviva	4.86	Second smallest municipality of San Marino.
(Niue) Toi	4.77	Village of Niue.
Jarvis Island	4.5	An island which is a territory of the United States of America.
Saint Andrew Parish	4.4	Third smallest parish of Guernsey.
Forest Parish	4.2	Second smallest parish of Guernsey.
Saint Clement Parish	4.2	Smallest parish of Jersey.
Saint Paul Charlestown Parish	4	Smallest parish of Saint Kitts and Nevis.
Wotho Atoll	4	Atoll and administrative district of Marshall Islands.
Nanumea (Land area only)	3.87	Atoll and administrative district of Tuvalu.
(North Macedonia) Čair	3.52	Municipality of North Macedonia.
Neutral Moresnet	3.5	Former neutral territory between Belgium, the Netherlands, and Germany. Existed between 1816 and 1920.
Schellenberg	3.5	Smallest municipality of Liechtenstein.
Sé, Macau	3.4	Third largest parish of Macau.
Nui (Land area only)	3.37	Atoll and administrative district of Tuvalu.
Montegiardino	3.31	Smallest municipality of San Marino.
Nossa Senhora de Fátima, Macau	3.2	Parish of Macau.
Sonsorol	3.12	Third smallest state of Palau.
Anibare District	3.1	One of the two largest districts of Nauru.
Meneng District	3.1	One of the two largest districts of Nauru.
Torteval Parish	3.1	Smallest parish of Guernsey.
Namorik Atoll	3	Atoll and administrative district of Marshall Islands.
Coral Sea Islands	3	External territory of Australia.
Nukufetau (Land area only)	2.99	Atoll and administrative district of Tuvalu.
City of London	2.9	Smallest county (or equivalent) in the United Kingdom.
Johnston Atoll	2.67	An island which is a territory of the United States of America.
Buada District	2.6	Third largest district of Nauru.
Howland Island	2.6	An island which is a territory of the United States of America.
Baker Island	2.1	An island which is a territory of the United States of America.
Monaco	2.02	Country in Europe; smallest French speaking country.
Ujae Atoll	2	Atoll and administrative district of Marshall Islands.
Utirik Atoll	2	Atoll and administrative district of Marshall Islands.
Nibok District	1.6	District of Nauru.
Redonda	1.6	Dependency of Antigua and Barbuda.
Anabar District	1.5	District of Nauru.
Yaren District	1.5	District of Nauru.
(Niue) Namukulu	1.48	Village of Niue.
Kayangel	1.4	Second smallest state of Palau.
Baitsi District	1.2	District of Nauru.
Ewa District	1.2	District of Nauru.
Santo António, Macau	1.1	Third smallest parish of Macau.
Ijuw District	1.1	District of Nauru.
Aiwo District	1.1	District of Nauru.
Anetan District	1	District of Nauru.
São Lourenço, Macau	1	Second smallest parish of Macau.
St. George's, Bermuda	1	Estimate; largest municipality of Bermuda.
Lae Atoll	1	Atoll and administrative district of Marshall Islands.
Denigomodu District	0.9	Third smallest district of Nauru.
Uaboe District	0.8	Second smallest district of Nauru.
Rockall	0.784	An uninhabitable islet in the North Atlantic Ocean.
Hamilton, Bermuda	0.7	Smallest municipality of Bermuda.
São Lázaro	0.64	Smallest parish of Macau.
Monte-Carlo	0.61	Largest commune of Monaco.
Boe District	0.5	Smallest district of Nauru.
Vatican City	0.44	Country in Europe; smallest country in the world.
Larvotto	0.337	Second largest commune of Monaco.
Fontvieille	0.335	Third largest commune of Monaco.
Just Room Enough Island	0.31	The smallest inhabited island in the world, also known as the Hub Island, it is located in New York, United States.
La Condamine	0.295	Commune of Monaco.
Monaco-Ville	0.196	Commune of Monaco.
La Rousse	0.177	Commune of Monaco.
La Colle	0.176	Commune of Monaco.
Saint Michel	0.142	Third smallest commune of Monaco.
Moneghetti	0.104	Second smallest commune of Monaco.
Les Révoires	0.076	Smallest commune of Monaco.
Liberty Island	0.06	Federally-owned island in New York City.
Kingman Reef	0.03	A submerged reef which is a territory of the United States of America.
Ravin de Sainte-Dévote	0.0234	Smallest ward of Monaco and smallest first level administrative subdivision in the world.
São João Baptista de Ajudá	0.02	Portuguese colony de facto part of Benin; no formal annexation treaty.
Sovereign Military Order of Malta	0.013	Sovereign entity of international law; Palazzo Malta and Villa Malta, within (but not part of) Rome.
Republic of Molossia	0.0045	A Micronation located near Dayton, Nevada.
Principality of Sealand	0.004	A Micronation that claims Roughs Tower.

== See also ==
Other divisions

- 0.1 to 1,000,000+ square kilometers
- 1,000,000+ square kilometers

Smaller divisions

- 200,000+ square kilometers • 100,000 to 1,000,000 square kilometers • 50,000 to 200,000 square kilometers • 20,000 to 50,000 square kilometers
- 5,000 to 20,000 square kilometers • 1,000 to 5,000 square kilometers • 0.1 to 1,000 square kilometers
- 500,000 to 1,000,000 square kilometers • 200,000 to 500,000 square kilometers • 100,000 to 200,000 square kilometers
- 50,000 to 100,000 square kilometers • 30,000 to 50,000 square kilometers • 20,000 to 30,000 square kilometers • 10,000 to 20,000 square kilometers
- 7,000 to 10,000 square kilometers • 5,000 to 7,000 square kilometers • 3,000 to 5,000 square kilometers • 1,000 to 3,000 square kilometers
- 250 to 1,000 square kilometers • 50 to 250 square kilometers • Under 50 square kilometers

Other

- List of countries and dependencies by area
- List of largest empires
- List of administrative divisions by country
- Category:Ranked lists of country subdivisions
