= List of political and geographic subdivisions by total area from 5,000 to 20,000 square kilometers =

This is one of a series of comprehensive lists of continents, countries, and first level administrative country subdivisions such as states, provinces, and territories, as well as certain political and geographic features of substantial area. References for the information provided in this table may be found in the individual articles on each body listed herein. Some divisions are listed twice, with one listing including territory that is excluded in the other for various reasons, including territorial disputes. There is intentional overlap among the lists in order to maximize ease of use.

Geographic entity	Area (km^{2})	Notes
(Central African Republic) Nana-Grébizi	19,996	Economic prefecture of the Central African Republic.
Johor	19,984	State of Malaysia.
(Ghana) Eastern Region	19,977	Region of Ghana.
Lower Silesian Voivodeship (Dolnośląskie)	19,947	Voivodeship of Poland.
Chüy Region	19,895	Region of Kyrgyzstan.
Huila Department	19,890	District of Colombia.
Rhineland-Palatinate (Rheinland-Pfalz)	19,847	State of Germany.
Lara	19,800	State of Venezuela.
(Morocco) Fès-Boulemane	19,795	Region of Morocco.
Leinster	19,774	A historical province of Ireland occupying the southeastern quarter of the island.
West Nusa Tenggara	19,709	Province of Indonesia.
Southern Province, Sierra Leone	19,694	Second largest province of Sierra Leonne.
(Syria) Raqqa	19,618	Governorate of Syria.
(Nigeria) Edo State	19,584	State of Nigeria.
(Kamphaeng Phet province) Kamphaeng Phet Province	19,483	Third largest province of Thailand.
(Afghanistan) Paktika Province	19,482	Province of Afghanistan.
Lake Ontario	19,477	Lake in North America, between Canada and the United States.
(Central African Republic) Sangha-Mbaéré	19,412	Economic prefecture of the Central African Republic.
(Iran) Hamedan Province	19,368	Province of Iran.
Apulia	19,362	Region of Italy.
(Central African Republic) Lobaye	19,235	Third smallest prefecture of the Central African Republic.
Lower Austria	19,178	Largest state of Austria.
(Greece) Central Macedonia	19,147	Largest region of Greece.
(Turkey) Van Province	19,069	Province of Turkey.
(Senegal) Saint-Louis Region	19,044	Region of Senegal.
North Gyeongsang Province	19,024	Largest province of South Korea.
Agin-Buryat Autonomous Okrug	19,000	Federal subject of Russia. (also included in Zabaykalsky Territory total)
(Norway) Sør-Trøndelag	18,832	County of Norway.
(Iran) Tehran Province	18,814	Province of Iran.
(Japan) Shikoku	18,800	Island of Japan, region containing the prefectures of Tokushima, Kagawa, Ehime and Kōchi.
Bangka Belitung Islands	18,725	Province of Indonesia.
(Algeria) M'Sila Province	18,718	Province of Algeria.
Sogn og Fjordane	18,619	County of Norway.
(Sucumbíos Province) Sucumbíos	18,612	Province of Ecuador.
(Turkey) Şanlıurfa Province	18,584	Province of Turkey.
New Caledonia	18,575	French dependency.
(North Korea) South Hamgyŏng Province	18,558	Largest province of North Korea.
(Gabon) Moyen-Ogooué	18,535	Smallest province of Gabon.
(Syria) Aleppo	18,498	Governorate of Syria.
(Ghana) Upper West Region	18,477	Region of Ghana.
(Los Ríos Region) Los Ríos	18,430	Region of Chile.
Lake Balkhash	18,428	Lake in Kazakhstan.
Saxony (Sachsen)	18,416	State of Germany.
Manabí Province	18,400	Province of Ecuador.
Veneto	18,391	Region of Italy.
Chuvash Republic	18,300	Federal subject of Russia.
Pomeranian Voivodeship (Pomorskie)	18,293	Voivodeship of Poland.
Fiji	18,274	Country in Oceania.
Łódź Voivodeship (Łódzkie)	18,219	Voivodeship of Poland.
Gävleborg County	18,191	County of Sweden.
Gauteng	18,178	Smallest province of South Africa.
(Russia) Lake Ladoga	18,130	Lake in Russia.
(Concepción Department, Paraguay) Concepción Department	18,051	Department of Paraguay.
(Chad) Tandjilé	18,045	Region of Chad.
(Indonesia) Halmahera	18,040	Island part of Indonesia.
(Syria) Rif Dimashq	18,018	Governorate of Syria.
(Kuyavian–Pomeranian Voivodeship) Kuyavian-Pomeranian Voivodeship (Kujawsko-Pomorskie)	17,970	Voivodeship of Poland.
Subcarpathian Voivodeship (Podkarpackie)	17,926	Voivodeship of Poland.
Suez Governorate	17,840	Governorate of Egypt.
Kuwait	17,818	Country in Middle East.
(Cameroon) Northwest Province	17,812	Second smallest province of Cameroon.
(Iran) Ardabil Province	17,800	Province of Iran.
Connacht	17,713	A historical province of Ireland occupying the northwestern quarter of the island.
Aleutian Islands	17,670	Chain of islands divided between Russia and the U.S. state of Alaska
(Central African Republic) Basse-Kotto	17,604	Second smallest prefecture of the Central African Republic.
Värmland County	17,583	County of Sweden.
(Ivory Coast) Gôh-Djiboua District	17,580	District of Côte d'Ivoire.
(Indonesia) Seram Island	17,454	Island part of Indonesia.
(Yemen) Ma'rib Governorate	17,450	Governorate of Yemen.
(Nigeria) Gombe State	17,428	State of Nigeria.
Eswatini	17,364	Country in Africa.
(Afghanistan) Zabul Province	17,343	Province of Afghanistan.
(Afghanistan) Balkh Province	17,249	Province of Afghanistan.
Lazio	17,207	Region of Italy.
(Central African Republic) Kémo	17,204	Smallest prefecture of the Central African Republic.
Aral Sea	17,160	Lake in Central Asia, between Kazakhstan and Uzbekistan.
(Morocco) Tadla-Azilal	17,125	Region of Morocco.
(Nigeria) Delta State	17,095	State of Nigeria.
(Guinea) Mamou Region	17,074	Smallest region of Guinea.
Batken Region	17,048	Region of Kyrgyzstan.
Palawan	17,030.75	Largest province of the Philippines; includes the independent city of Puerto Princesa.
Republic of Serbian Krajina	17,028	Former unrecognized state in Europe.
(Togo) Plateaux	16,975	Largest region of Togo.
(Turkey) Kayseri Province	16,917	Province of Turkey.
(Senegal) Kédougou Region	16,896	Region of Senegal.
(Laos) Louangphabang	16,875	Second largest province of Laos.
(Arica y Parinacota Region) Arica and Parinacota	16,873	Region of Chile.
(Nigeria) Ogun State	16,850	State of Nigeria.
Wallonia	16,844	Region of Belgium.
West Sulawesi	16,796	Province of Indonesia.
(Tanzania) Mtwara	16,707	Region of Tanzania.
New Caledonia Grande Terre	16,648	Biggest island of New Caledonia.
(Honduras) Gracias a Dios	16,630	Second largest department of Honduras.
Pichincha Province	16,599	Province of Ecuador.
Nagaland	16,579	State of India.
(Itapúa Department) Itapúa	16,525	Department of Paraguay.
(Gangwon Province, South Korea) Gangwon Province	16,502	Second largest province of South Korea.
(Laos) Houaphan	16,500	Third largest province of Laos.
(Vietnam) Nghệ An Province	16,498.50	Largest province of Vietnam.
(Yemen) Abyan Governorate	16,450	Governorate of Yemen.
Beijing	16,411	Capital of China, direct-controlled municipality.
(Tak province) Tak Province	16,407	Province of Thailand.
(Uzbekistan) Samarqand Region	16,400	Region of Uzbekistan.
Styria	16,392	Second largest state of Austria.
(Laos) Xaignabouli	16,389	Province of Laos.
(Valparaíso Region) Valparaíso	16,378	Region of Chile.
(Iran) Chahar Mahaal and Bakhtiari Province	16,332	Province of Iran.
(Laos) Khammouan	16,315	Province of Laos.
(Laos) Phongsali	16,270	Province of Laos.
Thuringia (Thüringen)	16,172	State of Germany.
(Kenya) Nyanza Province	16,162	Second smallest province of Kenya.
(Russia) Franz Josef Land	16,134	Archipelago part of Russia.
(North Korea) Chagang Province	16,076	Second largest province of North Korea.
(Department of Tacna) Tacna Region	16,076	Region of Peru.
(Canada) Bathurst Island	16,042	Island in the Arctic Archipelago.
Tonlé Sap	16,000	Lake in Cambodia, at the height of the monsoon season.
(Afghanistan) Sar-e Pol Province	15,999	Province of Afghanistan.
(O'Higgins Region) O'Higgins	15,950	Region of Chile.
(Laos) Vientiane Prefecture	15,927	Province of Laos.
(Laos) Xiangkhoang	15,880	Province of Laos.
(Turkey) Mersin province	15,853	Province of Turkey.
(Canada) Prince Patrick Island	15,848	Island in the Arctic Archipelago.
(Santiago Metropolitan Region) Región Metropolitana de Santiago	15,782	Smallest region of Chile.
Schleswig-Holstein	15,763	State of Germany.
(Ubon Ratchathani province) Ubon Ratchathani Province	15,745	Province of Thailand.
(Department of Moquegua) Moquegua Region	15,734	Region of Peru.
East New Britain Province	15,724	Province of Papua New Guinea.
(Antarctica) Thurston Island	15,700	Island part of Antarctica.
Lake Vostok	15,690	Lake in Antarctica.
Hordaland	15,634	County of Norway.
Eastern Province, Sierra Leone	15,553	Smallest province of Sierra Leonne; second smallest first level subdivision.
Central Greece	15,549	Second largest region of Greece.
(Iran) Qazvin Province	15,549	Province of Iran.
(Vietnam) Gia Lai Province	15,536.90	Second largest province of Vietnam.
(Iran) Kohgiluyeh and Boyer-Ahmad Province	15,504	Province of Iran.
(Greece) Peloponnese	15,490	Third largest region of Greece.
Tacuarembó Department	15,438	Largest department of Uruguay.
(Laos) Champasak	15,415	Province of Laos.
(Laos) Oudomxai	15,370	Province of Laos.
North Sulawesi	15,364	Province of Indonesia.
(Turkey) Diyarbakır Province	15,355	Province of Turkey.
Telemark	15,313	County of Norway.
Chechen Republic	15,300	Federal subject of Russia. (the exact area is unknown as the border of Chechnya with Ingushetia has not been demarcated).
(Uzbekistan) Tashkent Region	15,300	Region of Uzbekistan.
Iwate	15,275.01	Prefecture of Japan.
Esmeraldas Province	15,216	Province of Ecuador.
Portuguesa	15,200	State of Venezuela.
Lesser Poland Voivodeship (Małopolskie)	15,144	Voivodeship of Poland.
Møre og Romsdal	15,104	County of Norway.
Kaliningrad Oblast	15,100	Federal subject of Russia.
Southern Highlands Province	15,089	Province of Papua New Guinea.
Calabria	15,080	Region of Italy.
(Nigeria) Ondo State	15,019	State of Nigeria.
(Saudi Arabia) Al Bahah Province	15,000	Province of Saudi Arabia.
Buskerud	14,927	County of Norway.
Kelantan	14,922	State of Malaysia.
(Alto Paraná Department) Alto Paraná	14,895	Department of Paraguay.
East Timor	14,874	Country in Southeast Asia.
(Laos) Bolikhamxai	14,863	Province of Laos.
Cojedes	14,800	State of Venezuela.
(Canindeyú Department) Canindeyú	14,667	Department of Paraguay.
Milne Bay Province	14,345	Province of Papua New Guinea.
(Namibia) Caprivi Region	14,528	Region of Namibia.
(Svalbard) Nordaustlandet	14,467	Island part of Svalbard, Norway.
(Indonesia) Sumbawa	14,386	Island part of Indonesia.
Connecticut	14,357	State of the United States.
(Turkey) Kahramanmaraş Province	14,327	Province of Turkey.
Lucayan Archipelago	14,308	One of three island chains in the Caribbean, consisting of the Bahamas and Turks and Caicos Islands.
(Turkey) Balıkesir Province	14,292	Province of Turkey.
(Cambodia) Mondulkiri Province	14,288	Largest province of Cambodia.
(Department of Lambayeque) Lambayeque Region	14,231	Region of Peru.
(Turkey) Afyonkarahisar Province	14,230	Province of Turkey.
(Algeria) Tébessa Province	14,227	Province of Algeria.
(Russia) October Revolution Island	14,204	Island in the Zevernaya Zemlya archipelago, part of Russia.
(Afghanistan) Bamiyan Province	14,175	Province of Afghanistan.
(Vietnam) Sơn La Province	14,174.40	Third largest province of Vietnam.
(Ivory Coast) Comoé District	14,173	District of Côte d'Ivoire.
Salto Department	14,163	Second largest department of Uruguay.
(Greece) East Macedonia and Thrace	14,157	region of Greece.
(Indonesia) Flores	14,154	Island part of Indonesia.
(Ivory Coast) Moyen-Cavally	14,150	Region of Côte d'Ivoire.
Northern Ireland	14,139	Smallest constituent country of the United Kingdom.
(Cuba) Camagüey Province	14,134	Largest province of Cuba.
(Turkey) Yozgat Province	14,123	Province of Turkey.
(New Zealand) Hawke's Bay	14,111	Region of New Zealand.
(Israel) Southern District	14,107	Largest District of Israel.
Karachay–Cherkess Republic	14,100	Federal subject of Russia.
(Iran) Gilan Province	14,042	Province of Iran.
Thessaly	14,037	region of Greece.
Lubusz Voivodeship (Lubuskie)	13,984	Voivodeship of Poland.
(Benin) Collines Department	13,931	Department of Benin.
Ivano-Frankivsk Oblast	13,928	Oblast of Ukraine.
Paysandú Department	13,922	Third largest department of Uruguay.
(North Korea) Ryanggang Province	13,888	Third largest province of North Korea.
Bahamas	13,878	Country in the Caribbean.
(Cameroon) West Province	13,872	Smallest province of Cameroon.
(Yemen) Sana'a Governorate	13,850	Governorate of Yemen. Possibly divided in 2004, with territory going to a new governorate of unspecified area, Raymah Governorate.
Ternopil Oblast	13,823	Oblast of Ukraine.
(Cambodia) Kampong Thom	13,814	Second largest province of Cambodia.
Montenegro	13,812	Country in Europe.
(Turkey) Manisa Province	13,810	Province of Turkey.
Puerto Rico	13,790	Territory of the United States.
(New Zealand) Northland	13,789	Region of New Zealand.
(Cambodia) Preah Vihear Province	13,788	Third largest province of Cambodia.
Fukushima	13,783.74	Prefecture of Japan.
(Isabela (province)) Isabela	13,778.76	Second largest province of the Philippines; includes the independent city of Santiago.
(Senegal) Kolda Region	13,718	Region of Senegal.
(Turkey) Eskişehir Province	13,652	Province of Turkey.
Cerro Largo Department	13,648	Department of Uruguay.
(Republic of the Congo) Kouilou	13,644	Department of the Republic of the Congo.
Trentino-Alto Adige/Südtirol	13,607	Region of Italy.
(Mauritania) Gorgol	13,600	Region of Mauritania.
Campania	13,595	Region of Italy.
(Flanders) Flemish Region	13,522	Region of Belgium.
Talas Region	13,406	Third smallest region of Kyrgyzstan.
(Turkey) Muğla province	13,338	Province of Turkey.
(Togo) Centrale	13,317	Second largest region of Togo.
(Tanzania) Kilimanjaro	13,309	Region of Tanzania.
Lake Maracaibo	13,300	Lake in Venezuela
(Morocco) Doukkala-Abda	13,285	Region of Morocco.
(Yemen) Al Hudaydah Governorate	13,250	Governorate of Yemen. Possibly divided in 2004, with territory going to a new governorate of unspecified area, Raymah Governorate.
(Kenya) Central Province	13,191	Third smallest Province of Kenya.
Lesser Antilles	14,364	Third major island chain in the Caribbean.
(Vietnam) Đắk Lắk Province	13,139.20	Province of Vietnam.
(Canada) King William Island	13,111	Island in the Arctic Archipelago.
(Turkey) Kastamonu Province	13,108	Province of Turkey.
Nagano	13,104.29	Prefecture of Japan.
Central Denmark Region	13,095.80	Largest region of Denmark.
(Philippines) Negros	13,075	Third-largest island part of the Philippines.
Terengganu	12,955	State of Malaysia.
(Amambay Department) Amambay	12,933	Department of Paraguay.
(Surat Thani province) Surat Thani Province	12,892	Province of Thailand.
(Philippines) Samar	12,849	Island part of the Philippines.
(Turkey) Çorum Province	12,820	Province of Turkey.
(Turkey) Adana Province	12,788	Province of Turkey.
(Chai Nat province) Chainat Province	12,778	Province of Thailand.
Zakarpattia Oblast	12,777	Oblast of Ukraine.
Northwestern Region (Iceland)	12,737	Region of Iceland.
(Bangladesh) Sylhet Division	12,718	Second smallest division of Bangladesh.
(Cambodia) Pursat Province	12,692	Province of Cambodia.
(Lopburi province) Lopburi Province	12,681	Province of Thailand.
(Phayao province) Phayao Province	12,668	Province of Thailand.
(Yemen) Lahij Governorate	12,650	Governorate of Yemen.
(Tyrol (federal state)) Tyrol	12,648	Third largest state of Austria.
Niigata	12,584.10	Prefecture of Japan.
(North Korea) North P'yŏngan Province	12,575	Province of North Korea.
(Krabi province) Krabi Province	12,534	Province of Thailand.
Kabardino-Balkar Republic	12,500	Federal subject of Russia.
(Oman) Al Batinah Region	12,500	Second largest region of Oman.
(New Zealand) Marlborough	12,484	Unitary authority of New Zealand.
Napo Province	12,426	Province of Ecuador.
(Yemen) Sa'dah Governorate	12,370	Governorate of Yemen.
(Afghanistan) Takhar Province	12,333	Province of Afghanistan.
(Turkey) Malatya Province	12,313	Province of Turkey.
Silesian Voivodeship (Śląskie)	12,294	Third smallest Voivodeship of Poland.
(Republic of the Congo) Bouenza	12,266	Third smallest department of the Republic of the Congo.
(New Zealand) Bay of Plenty	12,231	Region of New Zealand.
Gorontalo	12,215	Province of Indonesia.
(Algeria) Batna Province	12,192	Province of Algeria.
(Philippines) Palawan	12,189	Island part of the Philippines.
Vanuatu	12,189	Country in Oceania.
(North Korea) North Hamgyŏng Province	12,189	Province of North Korea.
Falkland Islands	12,173	British Overseas Territory in the South Atlantic Ocean (near South America). Claimed by Argentina. Excludes South Georgia and the South Sandwich Islands.
(Paraguay) Ñeembucú	12,147	Department of Paraguay.
Region of Southern Denmark	12,132.21	Region of Denmark.
Lanao del Sur	12,051.85	Third largest province of the Philippines.
Île-de-France	12,012	Second smallest region of Metropolitan France.
(Philippines) Panay	12,011	Island part of the Philippines.
South Jeolla Province	11,987	Third largest province of South Korea.
Upper Austria	11,982	State of Austria.
(Turkey) İzmir Province	11,973	Province of Turkey.
Artigas Department	11,928	Department of Uruguay.
(China) Tianjin	11,917	Direct-controlled municipality of China.
(Turkey) Erzincan Province	11,903	Province of Turkey.
(Turkey) Kütahya Province	11,875	Province of Turkey.
(Turkey) Denizli Province	11,868	Province of Turkey.
(Senegal) Kaffrine Region	11,853	Region of Senegal.
Mon State	11,831	State of Myanmar (Myanmar has certain administrative divisions titled as Divisions, and others titled as States).
Sucre	11,800	State of Venezuela.
(Afghanistan) Jowzjan Province	11,798	Province of Afghanistan.
(Indonesia) Yos Sudarso Island	11,742	Island part of Indonesia.
(Togo) Kara	11,738	Region of Togo.
(Udon Thani province) Udon Thani Province	11,730	Province of Thailand.
Enga Province	11,704	Province of Papua New Guinea.
(Chiang Mai province) Chiang Mai Province	11,678	Province of Thailand.
(Saudi Arabia) Jizan Province	11,671	Smallest province of Saudi Arabia.
Świętokrzyskie Voivodeship (Świętokrzyskie)	11,671	Second smallest Voivodeship of Poland.
Kayah State	11,670	Smallest state of Myanmar, second largest administrative entity (Myanmar has certain administrative divisions titled as Divisions, and others titled as States).
(Cuba) Matanzas Province	11,669	Second largest province of Cuba.
Durazno Department	11,643	Department of Uruguay.
(Pakistan) Azad Kashmir	11,639	Province of Pakistan.
Akita	11,637.54	Prefecture of Japan.
(North Korea) South P'yŏngan Province	11,577	Province of North Korea.
(Morocco) Tangier-Tétouan	11,570	Region of Morocco.
Nimba	11,551	Largest county of Liberia.
(Iran) Qom Province	11,526	Smallest province of Iran.
Caaguazú Department	11,474	Department of Paraguay.
(Nakhon Si Thammarat province) Nakhon Si Thammarat Province	11,472	Province of Thailand.
Nagorno-Karabakh	11,458	Independent non-sovereign republic in Azerbaijan.
Querétaro	11,449	State of Mexico.
(Lamphun province) Lamphun Province	11,425	Province of Thailand.
(Indonesia) Bangka Island	11,413	Island part of Indonesia.
(Bangladesh) Barisal Division	11,394	Smallest division of Bangladesh.
(Turkey) Ağrı Province	11,376	Province of Turkey.
West Greece	11,350	region of Greece.
Murcia	11,313	Autonomous community of Spain.
(Georgia (country)) Kakheti	11,311	Largest region of Georgia.
Mérida	11,300	State of Venezuela.
(Canada) Ellef Ringnes Island	11,295	Island part of the Arctic Archipelago.
Gambia	11,295	Country in Africa.
Puntarenas Province	11,266	Largest province of Costa Rica.
(Afghanistan) Samangan Province	11,262	Province of Afghanistan.
(Russia) Bolshevik Island	11,206	Island part of the Severnaya Zemlya archipelago, part of Russia.
Kalmar County	11,171	County of Sweden.
(Cambodia) Koh Kong Province	11,160	Province of Cambodia.
(Eastern Highlands (Papua New Guinea)) Eastern Highlands Province	11,157	Province of Papua New Guinea.
(Vietnam) Thanh Hóa Province	11,136.30	Province of Vietnam.
(Benin) Donga Department	11,126	Department of Benin.
Táchira	11,100	State of Venezuela.
(Cambodia) Kratie Province	11,094	Province of Cambodia.
(Cambodia) Stung Treng Province	11,092	Province of Cambodia.
Darien Province	11,091	Largest province of Panama.
(Cambodia) Battambang Province	11,072	Province of Cambodia.
(Canada) Bylot Island	11,067	Island part of the Arctic Archipelago.
Skåne County	11,027	County of Sweden.
Central Bohemian Region	11,014.97	Largest region of the Czech Republic.
Qatar	11,000	Country in Middle East.
Jamaica	10,991	Country in the Caribbean.
(Turkey) Bursa Province	10,963	Province of Turkey.
Sucre Department	10,917	District of Colombia.
Kosovo	10,887	Region in Europe; recognized by some countries as an independent country.
(Kanchanaburi province) Kanchanaburi Province	10,886	Province of Thailand.
(Cuba) Pinar del Río Province	10,860	Third largest province of Cuba.
(Phichit province) Phichit Province	10,816	Province of Thailand.
Abruzzo	10,794	Region of Italy.
Loja Province	10,792	Province of Ecuador.
(Cambodia) Ratanakiri Province	10,782	Province of Cambodia.
(Indonesia) Sumba	10,711	Island part of Indonesia.
(Namibia) Ohangwena Region	10,703	Region of Namibia.
(Laos) Salavan	10,691	Province of Laos.
Veraguas Province	10,677	Second largest province of Panama.
(Ivory Coast) Sud-Bandama	10,650	Region of Côte d'Ivoire.
Asturias	10,604	Autonomous community of Spain.
(North Korea) Kangwŏn Province	10,600	Third smallest province of North Korea.
Gifu	10,621.29	Prefecture of Japan.
(Philippines) Mindoro	10,572	Island part of the Philippines.
Östergötland County	10,562	County of Sweden.
(Zamora-Chinchipe Province) Zamora-Chinchipe	10,556	Province of Ecuador.
Rocha Department	10,551	Department of Uruguay.
(Fiji) Viti Levu	10,531	Largest island of Fiji.
South Gyeongsang Province	10,516	Province of South Korea.
(Russia) Kuril Islands	10,503.2	Archipelago part of Russia.
Bukidnon	10,498.59	Province of the Philippines.
Hela Province	10,498	Province of Papua New Guinea.
Tripura	10,492	State of India.
Grand Gedeh	10,484	Second largest county of Liberia.
Jönköping County	10,475	County of Sweden.
Lebanon	10,452	Country in Middle East.
(Vietnam) Quảng Nam Province	10,438.30	Province of Vietnam.
(Hawaii) Hawai'i (Big Island)	10,434	Island part of the U.S. state of Hawaii.
Florida Department	10,417	Department of Uruguay.
Navarre	10,391	Autonomous community of Spain.
(Nigeria) Rivers State	10,361	State of Nigeria.
Bangkok	10,323	Province of Thailand.
(Laos) Attapu	10,320	Province of Laos.
(Canada) Cape Breton Island	10,311	Island part of Canada.
(Mauritania) Guidimaka	10,300	Region of Mauritania.
(Cambodia) Siem Reap Province	10,299	Province of Cambodia.
(Portugal) Beja	10,225	District of Portugal.
(Canada) Haida Gwaii	10,180	Archipelago part of Canada.
(Syria) Hama	10,163	Governorate of Syria.
Guanacaste Province	10,141	Second largest province of Costa Rica.
Sinoe	10,137	Third largest county of Liberia.
Gyeonggi Province	10,135	Province of South Korea.
Beheira Governorate	10,130	Governorate of Egypt.
South Bohemian Region	10,056.79	Second largest region of the Czech Republic.
(Turkey) Bolu Province	10,037	Province of Turkey.
Lavalleja Department	10,016	Department of Uruguay.
(Yemen) Ta'izz Governorate	10,010	Governorate of Yemen.
Gironde	10,000	Largest continental department of France; second largest department of France.
Tonlé Sap	10,000	Lake in Cambodia.
Basilicata	9,992	Region of Italy.
Agusan del Sur	9,989.52	Province of the Philippines.
Lofa	9,982	County of Liberia.
Kinshasa	9,965	Province of the Democratic Republic of the Congo.
(Turkey) Tokat Province	9,958	Province of Turkey.
(Nakhon Sawan province) Nakhon Sawan Province	9,943	Province of Thailand.
(Russia) Lake Onega	9,891	Lake in Russia.
(Ghana) Central Region	9,826	Third smallest region of Ghana.
(Algeria) Khenchela Province	9,811	Province of Algeria.
(Cambodia) Kampong Cham Province	9,799	Province of Cambodia.
(Vietnam) Lâm Đồng Province	9,776.10	Province of Vietnam.
(New Zealand) Tasman	9,771	Unitary authority of New Zealand.
Alajuela Province	9,754	Third largest province of Costa Rica.
(Turkey) Çanakkale Province	9,737	Province of Turkey.
Vilnius County	9,729	County of Lithuania.
Marche	9,694	Region of Italy.
(Vietnam) Kon Tum Province	9,690.50	Province of Vietnam.
Gbarpolu	9,689	County of Liberia.
Treinta y Tres Department	9,676	Department of Uruguay.
Aomori	9,645.59	Prefecture of Japan.
(Panama) Panamá	9,633	Third largest province of Panama.
(Sakon Nakhon province) Sakon Nakhon Province	9,606	Province of Thailand.
(Nakhon Ratchasima province) Nakhon Ratchasima Province	9,598	Province of Thailand.
(Morocco) Rabat-Salé-Zemmour-Zaer	9,580	Region of Morocco.
(Turkey) Samsun Province	9,579	Province of Turkey.
(Vietnam) Điện Biên Province	9,562.50	Province of Vietnam.
New Ireland Province	9,557	Province of Papua New Guinea.
Misiones Department	9,556	Department of Paraguay.
Western Region (Iceland)	9,554	Third smallest region of Iceland.
(Democratic Republic of the Congo) Kasai-Oriental	9,545	Province of the Democratic Republic of the Congo.
Carinthia	9,536	State of Austria.
(Canada) Prince Charles Island	9,521	Island in the Arctic Archipelago.
Caazapá Department	9,496	Department of Paraguay.
(Greece) West Macedonia	9,451	Region of Greece.
(Turkey) Kars Province	9,442	Province of Turkey.
Kedah	9,426	State of Malaysia.
Opole Voivodeship (Opolskie)	9,412	Smallest Voivodeship of Poland.
Autonomous Region of Bougainville	9,384	Autonomous region of Papua New Guinea.
(Algeria) Mila Province	9,375	Province of Algeria.
Rivera Department	9,370	Department of Uruguay.
Bayelsa State	9,363	State of Nigeria.
Rogaland	9,326	County of Norway.
(Laos) Louang Namtha	9,325	Province of Laos.
Yamagata	9,323.15	Prefecture of Japan.
(Papua New Guinea) Bougainville Island	9,318	Largest island of the autonomous region of Bougainville, part of Papua New Guinea.
(Alaska) Kodiak Island	9,310	Island part of the U.S. state of Alaska.
Cagayan	9,295.75	Province of the Philippines.
Río Negro Department	9,282	Department of Uruguay.
(Yemen) Al Bayda' Governorate	9,270	Governorate of Yemen.
Cyprus	9,251	Country in Europe. Includes Turkish Republic of Northern Cyprus (only recognised by Turkey) and British sovereign military bases (Akrotiri and Dhekelia).
Landes	9,243	Second largest continental department of France; third largest department of France.
(Afghanistan) Nurestan Province	9,225	Province of Afghanistan.
(Nicaragua) Jinotega	9,222	Third largest region of Nicaragua.
Aust-Agder	9,212	County of Norway.
(Greece) Epirus	9,203	Region of Greece.
Limón Province	9,189	Province of Costa Rica.
Kagoshima	9,186.94	Prefecture of Japan.
(Turkey) Karaman Province	9,163	Province of Turkey.
Banten	9,161	Province of Indonesia.
(Turkey) Elazığ Province	9,153	Province of Turkey.
(Algeria) Sidi Bel Abbès Province	9,150	Province of Algeria.
(Vietnam) Lai Châu Province	9,112.30	Province of Vietnam.
(Cuba) Holguín Province	9,105	Province of Cuba.
Puerto Rico	9,104	Commonwealth of the United States.
Puerto Rico (main island)	9,100	Main island of the U.S. territory of Puerto Rico.
(Algeria) Tlemcen Province	9,061	Province of Algeria.
Dordogne	9,060	Department of France.
(Izabal Department) Izabal	9,038	Second largest department of Guatemala.
Cotabato	9,008.90	Province of the Philippines.
Soriano Department	9,008	Department of Uruguay.
(United States) Pine Ridge Indian Reservation	8,984	Reservation in the United States.
(Afghanistan) Wardak Province	8,938	Province of Afghanistan.
(Turkey) Isparta Province	8,933	Province of Turkey.
Quezon	8,926.01	Province of the Philippines; includes the independent city of Lucena.
(Turkey) Mardin Province	8,891	Province of Turkey.
(Honduras) Colón	8,875	Third largest department of Honduras.
(Algeria) Médéa Province	8,866	Province of Algeria.
(Ghana) Upper East Region	8,842	Second smallest region of Ghana.
(Sisaket province) Sisaket Province	8,840	Province of Thailand.
Polynesia	8,830	An island chain subdivision of Oceania, excluding Hawaii.
(Russia) Komsomolets Island	8,812	Island in the Zevernaya Zemlya archipelago, part of Russia.
(Morocco) Gharb-Chrarda-Béni Hssen	8,805	Third smallest region of Morocco.
Bong	8,772	County of Liberia.
Côte-d'Or	8,763	Department of France.
Aveyron	8,735	Department of France.
Leeward Islands	8,713.5	Subsection of islands in the Lesser Antilles
Paraguarí Department	8,705	Department of Paraguay.
(Romania) Timiș County	8,697	Largest county of Romania.
(Chad) Logone Occidental	8,695	Region of Chad.
(Alta Verapaz Department) Alta Verapaz	8,686	Third largest department of Guatemala.
Corsica	8,680	Island in the Mediterranean Sea and smallest region of Metropolitan France.
(Namibia) Oshana	8,653	Smallest region of Namibia.
(Greenland) Disko Island	8,612	Island part of Greenland.
(Kalasin province) Kalasin Province	8,608	Province of Thailand.
South Chungcheong Province	8,586	Third smallest province of South Korea.
Osun	8,585	State of Nigeria.
Saône-et-Loire	8,575	Department of France.
(Romania) Suceava County	8,553	Second largest county of Romania.
Örebro County	8,519	County of Sweden.
(Romania) Caraș-Severin County	8,514	Third largest county of Romania.
(Antarctica) Carney Island	8,500	Island part of Antarctica.
(Romania) Tulcea County	8,499	County of Romania.
Hiroshima	8,479.45	Prefecture of Japan.
(Chile) Chiloé Island	8,478	Island part of Chile.
Indonesia Buru	8,473	Island part of Indonesia.
(Togo) Savanes	8,470	Second smallest region of Togo.
Kronoberg County	8,458	County of Sweden.
Umbria	8,456	Region of Italy.
(Cuba) Granma Province	8,452	Province of Cuba.
Šiauliai County	8,540	County of Lithuania.
(Bács-Kiskun County) Bács-Kiskun	8,445	Largest county of Hungary.
Abkhazia	8,432	Autonomous republic of Georgia.
Hyōgo	8,400.96	Prefecture of Japan.
(Guatemala) El Quiché	8,378	Department of Guatemala.
(Kenya) Western Province	8,361	Second smallest Province of Kenya.
(New Zealand) Gisborne (or East Coast)	8,355	Unitary authority of New Zealand.
Crete	8,336	Region of Greece.
(Vietnam) Lạng Sơn Province	8,331.20	Province of Vietnam.
(Yemen) Hajjah Governorate	8,300	Governorate of Yemen.
(Roi Et province) Roi Et Province	8,299	Province of Thailand.
(North Korea) South Hwanghae Province	8,294	Second smallest province of North Korea.
Andaman and Nicobar Islands	8,249	Union Territory of India.
(Turkey) Muş Province	8,196	Province of Turkey.
Marne	8,162	Department of France.
(North Korea) North Hwanghae Province	8,154	Smallest province of North Korea.
Wellington	8,140	Region of New Zealand.
Lake Titicaca	8,135	Lake in South America between Bolivia and Peru.
(Turkey) Bingöl Province	8,125	Province of Turkey.
(Surin province) Surin Province	8,124	Province of Thailand.
Kaunas County	8,089	County of Lithuania.
(Afghanistan) Daykundi Province	8,088	Province of Afghanistan.
(Cuba) Villa Clara Province	8,069	Province of Cuba.
(Vietnam) Quảng Bình Province	8,065.30	Province of Vietnam.
North Jeolla Province	8,050	Second smallest province of South Korea.
(Afghanistan) Kunduz Province	8,040	Province of Afghanistan.
North Yorkshire	8,038	Largest administrative county of England.
Madrid	8,028	Autonomous community of Spain.
Galápagos Province	8,010	Province of Ecuador.
(Turkey) Aydın Province	8,007	Province of Turkey.
Lake Nicaragua	8,001	Lake in Nicaragua.
Republic of North Ossetia–Alania	8,000	Federal subject of Russia.
Puy-de-Dôme	7,970	Department of France.
Negros Occidental	7,965.21	Province of the Philippines; includes the independent city of Bacolod.
(Botswana) Kgatleng District	7,960	Third smallest district of Botswana.
Selangor	7,956	State of Malaysia.
Miranda	7,950	State of Venezuela.
(Honduras) Francisco Morazán	7,946	Department of Honduras.
(Vietnam) Hà Giang Province	7,945.80	Province of Vietnam.
(Canada) Anticosti Island	7,941	Island part of Canada.
(Honduras) Yoro	7,939	Department of Honduras.
Grand Bassa	7,936	County of Liberia.
(Senegal) Fatick Region	7,935	Region of Senegal.
Lake Athabasca	7,920	Lake in Canada.
(Antarctica) Roosevelt Island	7,910	Island part of Antarctica.
(North Denmark Region) North Jutland Region	7,907.09	Region of Denmark.
(Uzbekistan) Namangan Region	7,900	Region of Uzbekistan.
(Yemen) 'Amran Governorate	7,900	Governorate of Yemen.
Iloilo	7,899.35	Province of the Philippines; includes the independent city of Iloilo.
Caldas Department	7,888	District of Colombia.
(Georgia (country)) Shida Kartli	7,882	Second largest region of Georgia.
Panevėžys County	7,881	County of Lithuania.
(Russia) Wrangel Island	7,866	Island part of Russia.
Friuli-Venezia Giulia	7,855	Region of Italy.
(Uttaradit province) Uttaradit Province	7,839	Province of Thailand.
(Vietnam) Bình Thuận Province	7,836.90	Province of Vietnam.
Shizuoka	7,777.42	Prefecture of Japan.
(Turkey) Tunceli Province	7,774	Province of Turkey.
(Romania) Arad County	7,754	County of Romania.
Miyazaki	7,735.31	Prefecture of Japan.
(Afghanistan) Nangarhar Province	7,727	Province of Afghanistan.
Azuay Province	7,701	Province of Ecuador.
Province of Sassari	7,691.75	Largest province of Italy.
(Laos) Xekong	7,665	Province of Laos.
Pyrénées-Atlantiques	7,645	Department of France.
(Algeria) Oum El Bouaghi Province	7,638	Province of Algeria.
(Turkey) Aksaray Province	7,626	Province of Turkey.
Maguindanao	7,623.75	Province of the Philippines; includes the independent city of Cotabato.
(Bulgaria) Burgas Province	7,618	Largest province of Bulgaria.
(Turkey) Adıyaman Province	7,614	Province of Turkey.
Republic of Adygea	7,600	Third smallest federal subject of Russia.
(Yemen) Dhamar Governorate	7,590	Governorate of Yemen.
({{{alias}}}) Abuja Federal Capital Territory	7,569	Federal Capital Territory of Nigeria (analogous to a state).
Plzeň Region	7,561	Third largest region of the Czech Republic.
Enugu	7,560	State of Nigeria.
(Romania) Bihor County	7,544	County of Romania.
(Nicaragua) Río San Juan	7,541	Region of Nicaragua.
County Cork	7,508	Largest county of the Republic of Ireland, in the province of Munster.
Canary Islands	7,447	Autonomous community of Spain.
(Turkey) Artvin Province	7,436	Province of Turkey.
North Chungcheong Province	7,432	Smallest province of South Korea.
Isère	7,431	Department of France.
Yonne	7,427	Department of France.
(Romania) Dolj County	7,414	County of Romania.
Kumamoto	7,409.35	Prefecture of Japan.
(Papua New Guinea) New Ireland (island)	7,405	Island part of Papua New Guinea.
(Huehuetenango Department) Huehuetenango	7,400	Department of Guatemala.
Trujillo	7,400	State of Venezuela.
South Tyrol	7,397.86	Second largest and autonomous province of Italy.
(Songkhla province) Songkhla Province	7,394	Province of Thailand.
(Portugal) Évora	7,393	District of Portugal.
(Turkey) Çankırı Province	7,388	Province of Turkey.
Aisne	7,369	Department of France.
(Philippines) Leyte	7,368	Island part of the Philippines.
Chernivtsi Oblast	7,359	Smallest oblast of Ukraine; third smallest political subdivision of Ukraine.
Allier	7,340	Department of France.
(Senegal) Ziguinchor Region	7,339	Region of Senegal.
(Nong Khai province) Nong Khai Province	7,332	Province of Thailand.
(Turkey) Niğde Province	7,312	Province of Turkey.
Zamboanga del Norte	7,301.00	Province of the Philippines.
(Senegal) Sédhiou Region	7,293	Region of Senegal.
Miyagi	7,282.22	Prefecture of Japan.
Vest-Agder	7,281	County of Norway.
(Bulgaria) Sofia Province	7,277	Second largest province of Bulgaria.
Cabinda Province	7,270	Second smallest province of Angola.
Region Zealand	7,268.75	Region of Denmark.
(New Zealand) Taranaki	7,257	Third smallest region of New Zealand.
(Borsod-Abaúj-Zemplén County) Borsod-Abaúj-Zemplén	7,247	Second largest county of Hungary.
Cher	7,235	Department of France.
Basque Country	7,234	Autonomous community of Spain.
(Honduras) El Paraíso	7,218	Department of Honduras.
(French Southern and Antarctic Lands) Kerguelen Islands	7,215	Second largest district of the French Southern and Antarctic Lands.
(Lithuania) Utena County	7,201	County of Lithuania.
(Djibouti) Dikhil Region	7,200	Largest region of Djibouti.
(Sa Kaeo province) Sa Kaeo Province	7,195	Province of Thailand.
South Moravian Region	7,194.56	Region of the Czech Republic.
(Turkey) Şırnak Province	7,172	Province of Turkey.
Maine-et-Loire	7,166	Department of France.
(Salzburg (state)) Salzburg	7,154	State of Austria.
(Turkey) Hakkâri Province	7,121	Province of Turkey.
Okayama	7,114.50	Prefecture of Japan.
Graubünden	7,105	Largest canton of Switzerland.
(Laos) Xaisomboun	7,105	Third smallest province of Laos.
Kōchi	7,103.93	Prefecture of Japan.
(Djibouti) Tadjourah Region	7,100	Second largest region of Djibouti.
Yaracuy	7,100	State of Venezuela.
Sikkim	7,096	State of India.
(Romania) Constanța County	7,071	County of Romania.
(Romania) Hunedoara County	7,063	County of Romania.
(Falkland Islands) East Falkland	7,040	Biggest island in the Falkland Islands.
(Denmark) Zealand (Sjælland)	7,031	Island part of Denmark.
(Cambodia) Kampong Speu Province	7,017	Province of Cambodia.
Aragua	7,014	State of Venezuela.
(Morocco) Chaouia-Ouardigha	7,010	Second smallest region of Morocco.
(Apulia) Province of Foggia	7,007	Third largest province of Italy.
(Oman) Al Buraimi Governorate	7,000	Third largest governorate of Oman.
(Canada) Cornwallis Island	6,995	Island in the Arctic Archipelago.
(Vienne (department)) Vienne	6,990	Department of France.
Uppsala County	6,989	County of Sweden.
(Chumphon province) Chumphon Province	6,947	Province of Thailand.
(Finland) Päijät-Häme	6,941.71	Region of Finland.
(Turkey) Giresun Province	6,934	Province of Turkey.
(Scotland) Argyll and Bute	6,930	Second largest unitary district of Scotland.
Alpes-de-Haute-Provence	6,925	Department of France.
(Province of Cuneo) Cuneo Province	6,902	Province of Italy.
(Vietnam) Yên Bái Province	6,899.50	Province of Vietnam.
(Turkey) Burdur Province	6,887	Province of Turkey.
(Vietnam) Bình Phước Province	6,883.40	Province of Vietnam.
Côtes-d'Armor	6,878	Department of France.
(Finland) South Karelia	6,872.13	Region of Finland.
Charente-Maritime	6,864	Department of France.
(Romania) Argeș County	6,862	County of Romania.
(Metropolitan City of Turin) Turin Province	6,827	Province of Italy.
Cumbria	6,824	Second largest administrative county of England.
Morbihan	6,823	Department of France.
Nièvre	6,817	Department of France.
Loire-Atlantique	6,815	Department of France.
(Nicaragua) Matagalpa	6,804	Region of Nicaragua.
(Uzbekistan) Fergana Region	6,800	Region of Uzbekistan.
Vysočina Region	6,795.56	Region of the Czech Republic.
Indre	6,791	Department of France.
Akwa Ibom State	6,788	State of Nigeria.
(Georgia (country)) Mtskheta-Mtianeti	6,786	Third largest region of Georgia.
Loiret	6,775	Department of France.
Ille-et-Vilaine	6,775	Department of France.
(Algeria) Saida Province	6,764	Province of Algeria.
(Portugal) Santarém	6,747	District of Portugal.
(Cuba) Sancti Spíritus Province	6,737	Province of Cuba.
Finistère	6,733	Department of France.
(Uthai Thani province) Uthai Thani Province	6,730	Province of Thailand.
(Vietnam) Cao Bằng Province	6,724.60	Province of Vietnam.
Vendée	6,720	Department of France.
(Romania) Mureș County	6,714	County of Romania.
(Province of Cosenza) Cosenza Province	6,710	Province of Italy.
Shimane	6,708.24	Prefecture of Japan.
(Turkey) Bitlis Province	6,707	Province of Turkey.
(Cambodia) Banteay Meanchey Province	6,679	Province of Cambodia.
(Alaska) Prince of Wales Island	6,675	Island part of the U.S. state of Alaska.
(Portugal) Castelo Branco	6,675	District of Portugal.
(Romania) Cluj County	6,674	County of Romania.
(Panama) Ngöbe-Buglé Comarca	6,673	Province of Panama.
Pas-de-Calais	6,671	Department of France.
Davao del Sur	6,667.06	Province of the Philippines; includes the independent city of Davao.
Negeri Sembilan	6,645	State of Malaysia.
(Romania) Harghita County	6,639	County of Romania.
(Romania) Bacău County	6,621	County of Romania.
(Portugal) Bragança	6,608	District of Portugal.
(Senegal) Thiès Region	6,601	Region of Senegal.
(Sukhothai province) Sukhothai Province	6,596	Province of Thailand.
(Province of Potenza) Potenza Province	6,594	Province of Italy.
(Turkey) Gümüşhane Province	6,575	Province of Turkey.
(Turkey) Kırşehir Province	6,570	Province of Turkey.
Devon	6,561	Third largest administrative county of England.
(Turkey) Kırklareli Province	6,550	Province of Turkey.
(Phitsanulok province) Phitsanulok Province	6,539	Province of Thailand.
Drôme	6,530	Department of France.
South Sardinia	6,530	Province of Italy.
Smallwood Reservoir	6,527	Lake in Canada.
(Vietnam) Đắk Nông Province	6,516.90	Province of Vietnam.
(Leyte (province)) Leyte	6,515.05	Province of the Philippines; includes the independent cities of Ormoc and Tacloban.
(Algeria) Sétif Province	6,504	Province of Algeria.
Stockholm County	6,488	County of Sweden.
(Nicaragua) Chontales	6,481	Region of Nicaragua.
(Bulgaria) Blagoevgrad Province	6,478	Third largest province of Bulgaria.
Chiriquí Province	6,477	Province of Panama.
(Georgia (country)) Imereti	6,448	Region of Georgia.
Delaware	6,447	State of the United States.
(Scotland) Dumfries and Galloway	6,439	Third largest unitary district of Scotland.
(Afghanistan) Paktia Province	6,432	Province of Afghanistan.
(Georgia (country)) Samtskhe-Javakheti	6,412	Region of Georgia.
Tochigi	6,408.09	Prefecture of Japan.
Lake Turkana	6,405	Lake in Kenya.
(Pest County) Pest	6,393	Third largest county of Hungary.
(Antarctica) Siple Island	6,390	Island part of Antarctica.
(Vietnam) Lào Cai Province	6,383.90	Province of Vietnam.
(Cuba) Las Tunas Province	6,373	Province of Cuba.
(Prachuap Khiri Khan province) Prachuap Khiri Khan Province	6,368	Province of Thailand.
(Cuba) Guantánamo Province	6,366	Province of Cuba.
Gunma	6,362.28	Prefecture of Japan.
(Canada) Graham Island	6,361	Island in the Haidwa Gwaii archipelago, part of Canada.
(Vietnam) Kiên Giang Province	6,348.30	Province of Vietnam.
Santiago de Cuba Province	6,343	Province of Cuba.
Loir-et-Cher	6,343	Department of France.
Ebonyi State	6,342	State of Nigeria.
(China) Shanghai	6,341	Largest city of China by Population.
Ōita	6,340.71	Prefecture of Japan.
(Chaiyaphum province) Chaiyaphum Province	6,338	Province of Thailand.
(Phatthalung province) Phatthalung Province	6,335	Province of Thailand.
(Province of Perugia) Perugia Province	6,334	Province of Italy.
Reindeer Lake	6,330	Lake in Canada.
(Aberdeenshire (historic)) Aberdeenshire	6,318	Unitary district of Scotland.
Haute-Garonne	6,309	Department of France.
(Romania) Maramureș County	6,304	County of Romania.
Västmanland County	6,302	County of Sweden.
(Uzbekistan) Xorazm Region	6,300	Region of Uzbekistan.
Seine-Maritime	6,278	Department of France.
(Turkey) Edirne Province	6,276	Province of Turkey.
Gers	6,257	Department of France.
(Los Ríos Province) Los Ríos	6,254	Province of Ecuador.
(Georgia (country)) Samegrelo-Zemo Svaneti	6,242	Region of Georgia.
(Romania) Alba County	6,242	County of Romania.
(Phetchabun province) Phetchabun Province	6,225	Province of Thailand.
(Turkey) Tekirdağ Province	6,218	Province of Turkey.
(Moselle (department)) Moselle	6,216	Department of France.
Lake Eyre	6,216	Lake in South Australia.
Trentino	6,212	Province of Italy. Autonomous province.
(Meuse (department)) Meuse	6,211	Department of France.
Haute-Marne	6,211	Department of France.
(Hajdú-Bihar County) Hajdú-Bihar	6,211	County of Hungary.
(Turkey) Gaziantep Province	6,207	Province of Turkey.
Sarthe	6,206	Department of France.
Jackson Purchase	6,202	Eight Kentucky counties purchased from the Chickasaw Indians.
(Russia) New Siberia	6,201	Island part of the New Siberian Islands archipelago, part of Russia.
Lake Issyk-Kul	6,200	Lake in Kyrgyzstan.
(Loei province) Loei Province	6,200	Province of Thailand.
(Laos) Bokeo	6,196	Second smallest province of Laos.
(Somme (department)) Somme	6,170	Department of France.
(Cambodia) Oddar Meancheay Province	6,158	Province of Cambodia.
County Galway	6,151	Second largest county in the Republic of Ireland, largest county in the province of Connacht.
Aude	6,139	Department of France.
Indre-et-Loire	6,127	Department of France.
Yamaguchi	6,112.30	Prefecture of Japan.
Chimbu Province	6,112	Province of Papua New Guinea.
Everglades National Park	6,110	Park in the U.S. state of Florida.
Colonia Department	6,106	Department of Uruguay.
Orne	6,103	Department of France.
(Romania) Buzău County	6,103	County of Romania.
Hérault	6,101	Department of France.
(Togo) Maritime	6,100	Smallest region of Togo.
(Vietnam) Quảng Ninh Province	6,099.00	Province of Vietnam.
Ibaraki	6,097.06	Prefecture of Japan.
(Syria) Idlib	6,097	Governorate of Syria.
(Portugal) Portalegre	6,065	District of Portugal.
Södermanland County	6,061	County of Sweden.
Auckland	6,059	Second smallest region of New Zealand.
(Samar (province)) Samar	6,048.03	Province of the Philippines.
Eure	6,040	Department of France.
(Vietnam) Bình Định Province	6,039.60	Province of Vietnam.
(Somogy County) Somogy	6,036	County of Hungary.
Savoie	6,028	Department of France.
(Vietnam) Hà Tĩnh Province	6,026.50	Province of Vietnam.
Palestine	6,020	Territory in the Middle East; figure consists of the West Bank and Gaza Strip.
(Indonesia) Mentawai Islands Regency	6,011.35	Chain of islands part of Indonesia.
(Chonburi province) Chon Buri Province	6,009	Province of Thailand.
Aube	6,004	Department of France.
(Turkey) Ordu Province	6,001	Province of Turkey.
Lake Urmia	6,001	Lake in Iran.
Dongting Lake	6,000	Lake in China.
Deux-Sèvres	5,999	Department of France.
El Oro Province	5,988	Province of Ecuador.
(Afghanistan) Parwan Province	5,974	Province of Afghanistan.
(Bulgaria) Plovdiv Province	5,973	Province of Bulgaria.
(Var (department)) Var	5,973	Department of France.
(Cuba) Ciego de Ávila Province	5,962	Province of Cuba.
Canton of Bern	5,959	Second largest canton of Switzerland.
(The Bahamas) Andros Island	5,957	Archipelago of the Bahamas.
Charente	5,956	Department of France.
(Algeria) Mascara Province	5,941	Province of Algeria.
Manche	5,938	Department of France.
(Szabolcs-Szatmár-Bereg County) Szabolcs-Szatmár-Bereg	5,936	County of Hungary.
Lincolnshire	5,921	Administrative county of England.
Seine-et-Marne	5,915	Department of France.
Zamboanga del Sur	5,914.16	Province of the Philippines; includes the independent city of Zamboanga.
(Vietnam) Đồng Nai Province	5,903.90	Province of Vietnam.
(Romania) Neamț County	5,896	County of Romania.
Eure-et-Loir	5,880	Department of France.
(Vosges (department)) Vosges	5,874	Department of France.
(Vietnam) Tuyên Quang Province	5,870.40	Province of Vietnam.
Occidental Mindoro	5,865.71	Province of the Philippines.
(Turkey) Sinop Province	5,862	Province of Turkey.
Oise	5,860	Department of France.
Corrèze	5,857	Department of France.
Gard	5,853	Department of France.
Distrito Federal	5,802	State of Brazil.
Ekiti State	5,797	State of Nigeria.
(Romania) Teleorman County	5,790	County of Romania.
Mie	5,774.40	Prefecture of Japan.
Brunei	5,765	Country in Country in Southeast Asia.
(Australia) Melville Island	5,765	Island part of Australia.
(Romania) Vâlcea County	5,765	County of Romania.
(United States) Bolivar Republic	5,762	Micronation State lying on the Mississippi River. It Covers the Mississippi Counties of Bolivar, Coahoma, Tallahatchie, Sunflower, Leflore, and Washington, as well covering the Arkansas counties of Desha and Philips
Ain	5,762	Department of France.
(Tarn (department)) Tarn	5,758	Department of France.
Friesland	5,753	Province of the Netherlands.
Nueva Ecija	5,751.33	Province of the Philippines.
(Nord (French department)) Nord	5,743	Department of France.
Cantal	5,726	Department of France.
(Finland) Kanta-Häme	5,707.63	Region of Finland.
Lake Torrens	5,698	Lake in South Australia.
Ehime	5,676.11	Prefecture of Japan.
Davao Oriental	5,670.07	Province of the Philippines.
Havana Province	5,669	Province of Cuba.
Prince Edward Island	5,660	Province of Canada.
(Province of Nuoro) Nuoro Province	5,638	Province of Italy.
Chimborazo Province	5,637	Province of Ecuador.
Bali	5,633	Province of Indonesia.
(Békés County) Békés	5,631	County of Hungary.
(Romania) Gorj County	5,602	County of Romania.
Rivercess	5,594	County of Liberia.
County Mayo	5,588	Third largest county in the Republic of Ireland, second largest county in the province of Connacht.
(Fiji) Vanua Levu	5,587	Second-largest island of Fiji.
(Jász-Nagykun-Szolnok County) Jász-Nagykun-Szolnok	5,582	County of Hungary.
(Turkey) Ardahan Province	5,576	Province of Turkey.
Creuse	5,565	Department of France.
(Chile) Wellington Island	5,556	Island part of Chile.
(Syria) As-Suwayda	5,550	Governorate of Syria.
Hautes-Alpes	5,549	Department of France.
(Calvados (department)) Calvados	5,548	Department of France.
Vänern	5,545	Lake in Sweden.
(Govisümber Province) Govisümber	5,540	Third smallest aimag of Mongolia.
Ardèche	5,529	Department of France.
(Cambodia) Kampong Chhnang Province	5,521	Province of Cambodia.
(Turkey) Amasya Province	5,520	Province of Turkey.
Haute-Vienne	5,520	Department of France.
(Portugal) Guarda	5,518	District of Portugal.
(Nakhon Pathom province) Nakhon Pathom Province	5,513	Province of Thailand.
Nakhchivan	5,502	Republic of Azerbaijan.
(Canada) Coats Island	5,498	Island part of the Arctic Archipelago.
(Romania) Olt County	5,498	County of Romania.
(Romania) Iași County	5,476	County of Romania.
(Solomon Islands) Western Province	5,475	Largest province of the Solomon Islands.
Aguascalientes	5,471	State of Mexico.
(Turkey) Nevşehir Province	5,467	Province of Turkey.
Camarines Sur	5,465.26	Province of the Philippines; includes the independent city of Naga.
Halland County	5,454	Third smallest county of Sweden.
Pangasinan	5,451.08	Province of the Philippines; includes the independent city of Dagupan.
(Romania) Sibiu County	5,432	County of Romania.
Moravian-Silesian Region	5,426.83	Region of the Czech Republic.
Alytus County	5,425	County of Lithuania.
Liguria	5,421	Third smallest region of Italy.
Pärnu County	5,419	Largest county of Estonia.
(United States) Uinta County	5,410	County in Wyoming
(Turkey) Siirt Province	5,406	Province of Turkey.
(Turkey) Hatay Province	5,403	Province of Turkey.
Lake Winnipegosis	5,403	Lake in Canada.
(Alaska) Chichagof Island	5,388	Island part of the U.S. state of Alaska.
Negros Oriental	5,385.53	Province of the Philippines.
Norfolk	5,372	Administrative county of England.
(Metropolitan City of Rome Capital) Rome Province	5,364	Province of Italy.
(Romania) Brașov County	5,363	County of Romania.
Lot-et-Garonne	5,361	Department of France.
Haute-Saône	5,360	Department of France.
(Suphan Buri province) Suphanburi Province	5,358	Province of Thailand.
(Romania) Bistrița-Năsăud County	5,355	County of Romania.
(Solomon Islands) Guadalcanal	5,353	Largest island of the Solomon Islands.
(Lika-Senj County) Lika-Senj	5,353	Largest county of Croatia.
(Buriram province) Buri Ram Province	5,351	Province of Thailand.
(Yemen) Ibb Governorate	5,350	Governorate of Yemen.
(Armenia) Gegharkunik Province	5,348	Largest province of Armenia.
(Turkey) Uşak Province	5,341	Province of Turkey.
(Guadalcanal Province) Guadalcanal	5,336	Second largest province of the Solomon Islands.
Ústí nad Labem Region	5,334.52	Region of the Czech Republic.
(Vietnam) Cà Mau Province	5,331.70	Province of Vietnam.
Cebu	5,331.07	Province of the Philippines; includes the independent cities of Cebu, Lapu-Lapu and Mandaue.
Cantabria	5,321	Third smallest autonomous community of Spain.
(Romania) Vaslui County	5,318	County of Romania.
(Scotland) Perth and Kinross	5,311	Unitary district of Scotland.
Lake Albert	5,299	Lake in Africa between Uganda and Zaire.
(Mae Hong Son province) Mae Hong Son Province	5,292	Province of Thailand.
Cotopaxi Province	5,287	Province of Ecuador.
(Greece) South Aegean	5,286	Periphery of Greece.
Olomouc Region	5,266.57	Region of the Czech Republic.
(Canada) Amund Ringnes Island	5,255	Island part of the Arctic Archipelago.
Sultan Kudarat	5,251.34	Province of the Philippines.
Meurthe-et-Moselle	5,246	Department of France.
(Benin) Zou Department	5,243	Department of Benin.
Doubs	5,234	Department of France.
(Ardennes (department)) Ardennes	5,229	Department of France.
Valais	5,224	Third largest canton of Switzerland.
(Turkey) Istanbul Province	5,220	Province of Turkey.
(Finland) Central Ostrobothnia	5,219.58	Region of Finland.
(Vietnam) Khánh Hòa Province	5,217.60	Province of Vietnam.
(Lot (department)) Lot	5,217	Department of France.
Klaipėda County	5,209	County of Lithuania.
(Wales) Powys	5,204	Largest unitary authority of Wales.
(Ratchaburi province) Ratchaburi Province	5,197	Province of Thailand.
(Honduras) Comayagua	5,196	Department of Honduras.
Colima	5,191	State of Mexico.
Mayenne	5,175	Department of France.
Aichi	5,172.48	Prefecture of Japan.
Lozère	5,167	Department of France.
Grand Cape Mount	5,162	County of Liberia.
Chiba	5,157.65	Prefecture of Japan.
(Russia) Bolshoy Lyakhovsky Island	5,157	Island in the New Siberian Islands archipelago, part of Russia.
(Vietnam) Quảng Ngãi Province	5,152.70	Province of Vietnam.
Flores Department	5,144	Department of Uruguay.
(León, Spain) León	5,138	Region of Nicaragua.
Gelderland	5,136	Province of the Netherlands.
Imo State	5,135	State of Nigeria.
(Alaska) St. Lawrence Island	5,135	Island part of the U.S. state of Alaska.
Trinidad and Tobago	5,130	Country in the Caribbean.
(Georgia (country)) Kvemo Kartli	5,122	Region of Georgia.
Lake Mweru	5,120	Lake in Africa between Democratic Republic of the Congo and Zambia.
(Botswana) North-East District	5,120	Second smallest district of Botswana.
(Honduras) Santa Bárbara	5,115	Department of Honduras.
River Gee	5,113	County of Liberia.
(Chile) Riesco Island	5,100	Island part of Chile.
(Uzbekistan) Sirdaryo Region	5,100	Third smallest region of Uzbekistan.
(Romania) Călărași County	5,088	County of Romania.
Bouches-du-Rhône	5,087	Department of France.
North Brabant	5,082	Province of the Netherlands.
(Svalbard) Edgeøya	5,073	Third-largest island of Svalbard, Norway.
Nettilling Lake	5,066	Lake in Canada; largest lake entirely on an island.
(Vietnam) Thừa Thiên–Huế Province	5,065.30	Province of Vietnam.
(Portugal) Setúbal	5,064	District of Portugal.
(Vietnam) Phú Yên Province	5,060.60	Province of Vietnam.
(Canada) Mackenzie King Island	5,048	Island part of the Arctic Archipelago.
(Province of L'Aquila) L'Aquila Province	5,047	Province of Italy.
La Rioja	5,045	Second smallest autonomous community of Spain.
(Albania) Korçë County	5,044	Largest county of Albania.
(Jamaica) Middlesex County	5,041.9	County of Jamaica.
Northumberland	5,026	Administrative county of England.
(Metropolitan City of Palermo) Palermo Province	5,009.28	Province of Italy.
(Trinidad and Tobago) Trinidad	5,009	Largest of the two main islands of Trinidad and Tobago.
(Portugal) Viseu	5,007	District of Portugal.

== See also ==
Other divisions

- 0.1 to 1,000,000+ square kilometers
- 1,000,000+ square kilometers

Smaller divisions

- 200,000+ square kilometers • 100,000 to 1,000,000 square kilometers • 50,000 to 200,000 square kilometers • 20,000 to 50,000 square kilometers
- 5,000 to 20,000 square kilometers • 1,000 to 5,000 square kilometers • 0.1 to 1,000 square kilometers
- 500,000 to 1,000,000 square kilometers • 200,000 to 500,000 square kilometers • 100,000 to 200,000 square kilometers
- 50,000 to 100,000 square kilometers • 30,000 to 50,000 square kilometers • 20,000 to 30,000 square kilometers • 10,000 to 20,000 square kilometers
- 7,000 to 10,000 square kilometers • 5,000 to 7,000 square kilometers • 3,000 to 5,000 square kilometers • 1,000 to 3,000 square kilometers
- 250 to 1,000 square kilometers • 50 to 250 square kilometers • Under 50 square kilometers

Other

- List of countries and dependencies by area
- List of largest empires
- List of administrative divisions by country
- Category:Ranked lists of country subdivisions
