= Venedikt Yevladov =

Russian orthodox priest and deputy of the Fourth Imperial Duma

Venedikt Viktorovich Yevladov Russian: Венедикт Викторович Евладов
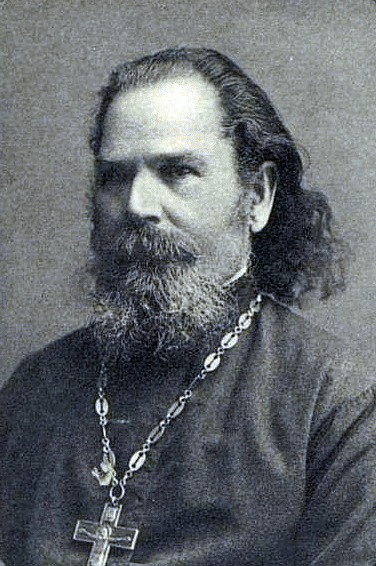
- Yevladov in 1913

Deputy of the Fourth Imperial Duma
- In office 3 December [O.S. 20 November] 1912 – 6 June [O.S. 24 May] 1914
- Monarch: Nicholas II

Personal details
- Born: 20 March [O.S. 8 March] 1861 Orenburg Governorate, Russian Empire
- Died: 6 June [O.S. 24 May] 1914 (aged 53) Saint Petersburg, Russian Empire
- Party: Progressive Party or Trudoviks

Venedikt Viktorovich Yevladov (Russian: Венедикт Викторович Евладов; 20 March [O.S. 8 March] 1861, Orenburg Governorate — 6 June [O.S. 24 May] 1914, Saint Petersburg) was an orthodox priest (father), an educator, and a deputy of the Fourth Imperial Duma from Orenburg Governorate between 1912 and 1914.

== Life and work ==
Venedikt Yevladov was born 20 March [O.S. 8 March] 1861.

He graduated from the Troitsk Gymnasium. In 1886 he was ordained as a priest. In 1887, he became rector of the Church of the Savior in Chumlyak, Chelyabinsky Uyezd, Orenburg Governorate.

Deputy of the Fourth Imperial Duma from Orenburg Governorate between 1912 and 1914.

On 6 June [O.S. 24 May] 1914, he died suddenly of a heart defect in the Mariinsky Hospital in Saint Petersburg.

He was buried in the Chumlyak, Chelyabinsky Uyezd, Orenburg Governorate, (now Shchuchansky District, Kurgan Oblast, Russia).

Venedikt's brother was Yevladov Nikolay Viktorovich (priest).
