= Benedikt =

Benedikt is a spelling of the masculine given name Benedict. Notable people with the name include:

- Benedikt Arnstein (1765–1841), Austrian author
- Benedikt Beckenkamp, German painter
- Benedikt Blinishti, Albanian politician
- Benedikt Brilmayer, German musicologist
- Benedikt Brueckner, German ice hockey player
- Benedikt Brydern, American violinist and composer
- Benedikt Böhm (born 1977), German extreme ski mountaineer
- Benedikt Büdenbender (born 1989), German politician
- Benedikt Doll (born 1990), German biathlete
- Benedikt Dreyer (1495–1555), German sculptor, carver and painter
- Benedikt Hertel (born 1996), German bobsledder
- Bénédict Pierre Georges Hochreutiner (1873–1959), Swiss botanist and plant taxonomist
- Benedikt Höwedes (born 1988), German footballer
- Benedikt Jóhannesson (born 1955), Icelandic publisher, businessman and politician
- Benedikt Kotruljević (1416–1469), Ragusan Renaissance humanist
- Benedikt Kuripečič (1491–1531), Slovene diplomat
- Benedikt Livshits (1887–1938), Russian poet, writer and translator
- Benedikt Niese (1849–1910), German classical scholar
- Benedikt Rejt (1450–1533), Bohemian architect
- Benedikt Roezl (1824–1885), Austrian botanist
- Benedikt Schack (1758–1826), Bohemian composer and tenor
- Benedikt Sigurðsson Gröndal (1924–2010), Prime Minister of Iceland
- Benedikt Waldeck (1802–1870), Prussian politician

== See also ==
- Venedikt
