= 1984 Guinea-Bissau parliamentary election =

- 31 March 1984
Party	Leader	Vote %	Seats	+/–
PAIGC	João Bernardo Vieira	100	150	0
This lists parties that won seats. See the complete results below.
Results by district
President before	President after
João Bernardo Vieira; PAIGC	João Bernardo Vieira; PAIGC

Indirect parliamentary elections were held in Guinea-Bissau on 31 March 1984. At the time, the country was a one-party state with the African Party for the Independence of Guinea and Cape Verde as the sole legal party. The Assembly elected João Bernardo Vieira to the post of President on 16 May 1984.

== Background ==
Guinea-Bissau had declared independent from Portugal in 1973 following a long insurgency which was recognized by Portugal in 1974. A coup in 1980 would overthrow the first president of Guinea-Bissau, Luís Cabral, in favor of FARP General João Bernardo Vieira due to Cabral being a mestiço with black Guineans having grown increasingly disgruntled with perceived mestiço economic and political control.

Vieira abolished the State Council and Council of ministers, instead ruling through a military junta, the "Revolutionary Council" of which he presided and 7 of its 9 members where black FARP officers. He sought to transform PIAGC into a genuine Vanguard Party in the Marxist Leninist style, consolidating the party from its highly decentralized and guerilla cell based structure into a hierarchical party to create a class of mobilized political professionals, which would extent the party's influence outside of the capital and into the more rural parts of the countryside.

To this end in 1981 Vieira held the "Extraordinary Party Congress" which created a 51-member "Central Committee" and 16 member "Political Bureau" which, together with the Revolutionary Council, where free to reshape the party in his image. Since even before independence both PIAGC and FARP operated on a decentralized model, with power vested in regional councils largely aligned to old guerilla networks during the war. This system favored the Balanta people, who formed the bulk of FARPs fighting men, and whose territory was mostly co-extensive with territory held by PAIGC during the war. The Balanta saw Vieira's reforms as an attempt to disenfranchise them in favor of his own Papel ethnic group.

=== Coup attempts ===
In 1982 a coup attempt would take place where a Balanta war hero, Paulo Correia, sought to restore the Balanta's dominance over the party, however, the coup attempted failed. Correia, who had only convinced segments of the military to stage the coup, but did not participate himself would be spared any serious repercussion, being demoted from the Minister of the Armed Forces to the Minister of Rural Development in an effort to isolate him from the army.

Then in 1983 the army threatened to stage a coup after its rice rations where cut. Although Vieira was able to talk the plotters down with concessions, he also formed the "National Security Council" an organ selected by and functioning at the disposition of the President, to "oversee" the Government, Party and Army. Vieira also became increasingly reliant on JAAC, PIAGC's youth wing, as he viewed them as untainted from existing military rivalries and political infighting, calling them in the 1983 PAIGC general congress the "future militants" and "fighting reserve of the PAIGC" alluding to having them militarily support his regime in the event of future unrest.

Victor Saúde Maria had been Vieira's foreign minister until 1981 and was named his Prime Minister starting in 1982 and almost immediately started vying for power with Vieira over control of government ministries. During the Extraordinary Party Conference Vieira would abolish the post of PIAGC Adjunct Secretary General, which Maria was set to receive. In return Maria blocked Vieira's efforts to hold single-party elections in 1981, 1982 and 1983, viewing such elections as an institution of preserving Vieria's personal strength. Finally in early March 1984 Vieira finally gathered enough support to not only call elections, but to also abolish the position of Prime Minister. Shortly after he had Maria arrested, alleging he was also plotting a coup.

== Electoral system ==
Voters elected regional councillors, who in turn elected members of the National People's Assembly.

The coup in effect transitioned Vieira's government from a stringent military junta, to at least outwardly appearing as a civilian government as he was also elected President.
