= 1983 Guinea-Bissau coup attempt =

Failed coup against João Bernardo Vieira

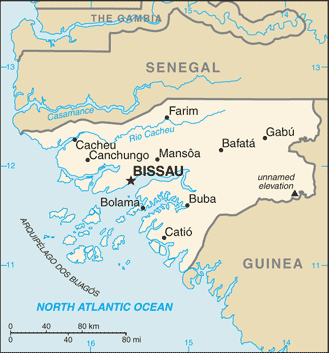
- Map of Guinea-Bissau.
Date	c. June 1983
Location	Bissau, Guinea-Bissau 11°51′N 15°34′W
Result	Coup attempt fails: Coup leadership arrested; Concessions granted to army

Belligerents
Guinea-Bissau: President of Guinea-Bissau; FARP (Factions); PAIGC; Supported by Soviet Union	(Guinea-Bissau) Opposition: FARP (Factions)

Commanders and leaders
João Bernardo Vieira	Joao de Silva

Casualties and losses
	Silva arrested
- Nexus of coup in Bissau (marked green), Guinea-Bissau

Reports of a foiled coup emerged in Guinea-Bissau in June 1983 following a widespread famine and food shortages as disgruntled young officers attempted to plot the overthrow of João Bernardo Vieira when rations for soldiers were cut.

== Background ==
Guinea-Bissau had declared independence from Portugal in 1973 following a long insurgency which was recognized by Portugal in 1974. A coup would overthrow the first president of Guinea-Bissau, Luís Cabral, in favor of FARP General João Bernardo Vieira due to Cabral being a mestiço with black Guineans having grown increasingly disgruntled with perceived mestiço economic and political control. Unlike Cabral, Vieira was a military man first and foremost, who abolished the State Council and Council of Ministers and replaced both of them with the "Revolutionary Council", over which he presided. Of its 9 members, 7 were black FARP members. This made Vieira increasingly reliant on the army, doing everything in his power to appease it. Since there were only a handful of posts to go around, some experienced soldiers were able to receive promotions, however, most of the FARP officer staff were left disgruntled as their careers stagnated. In 1982 an ethnically Balanta officer Paulo Correia attempted to stage a coup seeking better conditions for his ethnic group.

== Events ==
A food shortage would rock Guinea-Bissau in 1983 and by June Vieira had no choice but to reduce the rice ration for FARP soldiers. Anger quickly mounted within FARP, with a clique of young officers threatening Vieira with a coup if he was unable to improve the situation. In an attempt to appease the plotters he promised them new uniforms and political privileges, such as first call on rice, and priority over the rest of the population for oil and butter. Meanwhile, Vieira also had military barriers installed across Bissau and invited a Soviet warship to dock in the city, keeping it stationed there for twice as long as it was authorized in case intervention against a coup attempt was needed. Commander Joao de Silva emerged as a leader for the young officers, and was removed from his post.

== Aftermath ==
Vieira replaced the Revolutionary Council with the "National Security Council." He also became increasingly reliant on PAIGC's youth wing, JAAC. Afterwards he also replaced most of the civilian administration, replacing senior members of PAIGC for loyalists with extremely diluted power to keep the office of president as powerful as possible, including 11 secretaries of state and the gutting of the interior ministry. By March 1984 Vieira authorized single-party elections and then purged his prime minister Victor Saude Maria also alleging that Maria was plotting a coup in 1984. Maria was arrested and the office of Prime Minister was replaced with the "Vice-President of the Revolutionary Council", an office with no authority to question the president's orders. Later in 1984 Correia would re-emerge, advocating for full Balanta separatism, in response Vieira started executing Balanta officers with Correia attempting another coup in 1985 which also failed and resulted in his execution.

== See also ==
- 1980 Guinea-Bissau coup d'état
- 1982 Guinea-Bissau coup attempt
- 1984 Guinea-Bissau coup attempt
- 1985 Guinea-Bissau coup attempt
- 1993 Guinea-Bissau coup attempt
- 1998 Guinea-Bissau coup attempt
- Guinea-Bissau civil war
