= The Gambia–Guinea-Bissau relations =

- Gambia: Guinea-Bissau

The Gambia–Guinea-Bissau relations are foreign relations between the two West African nations which are part of ECOWAS. A former British colony, the Gambia reached their independence in 1965, while Guinea-Bissau gained their independence from Portugal in 1975. The two countries share historical, cultural and social ties through ethnic groups, trade networks and regional migration.

== History ==
Pre-colonial Kaabu Empire was a dominant power in the region of modern day Gambia and Guinea-Bissau for centuries. Starting from 15th century Portuguese traders and colonialists in Cape Verde developed commercial, social and cultural ties with African societies in Senegambia and upper Guinea.

Brigadier-General Ansumane Mané, a Gambian of Mandinga origin, was a former bodyguard and close ally of President of Guinea-Bissau João Bernardo Vieira during Guinea-Bissau War of Independence. He took part in the 1980 Guinea-Bissau coup d'état that ousted President Luís Cabral and in the subsequent purge of the Balanta elite. Over time, however, Mané became disillusioned as he was excluded from senior political positions and faced economic pressures.

President of The Gambia Yahya Jammeh played a key role in mediating conflicts in West Africa, including in Guinea-Bissau. In October 1998, he facilitated the first face-to-face meeting between President João Bernardo Vieira and General Ansumane Mané in Banjul during the Guinea-Bissau Civil War. Jammeh accompanied both leaders to an ECOWAS summit in Abuja, where they signed the Abuja Accord, calling for a government of national unity, withdrawal of foreign troops and deployment of ECOMOG and ECOWAS military intervention force.

Although the accord was short-lived, Jammeh continued efforts to prevent further escalation, including humanitarian intervention to allow the deposed President Vieira to seek medical treatment abroad. The Gambia also hosted refugees fleeing conflicts in Guinea-Bissau.

In 2024 two countries marked 50th anniversary of establishment of diplomatic relations.

On 8 September 2025, The Gambia and Guinea-Bissau signed the Security Cooperation Agreement in Bissau during an official visit by President of Gambia Adama Barrow. The accord is intended to promote stability and address shared threats in the West African sub-region, including cross-border trafficking and armed attacks.

== See also ==
- Casamance
