= 1993 Guinea-Bissau coup attempt =

Failed coup against João Bernardo Vieira

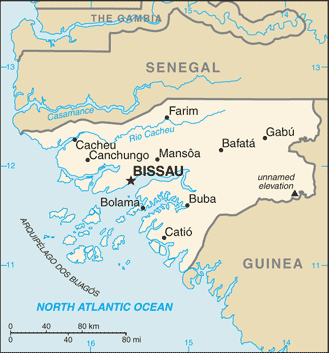
- Map of Guinea-Bissau.
Date	March 17, 1993
Location	Bissau, Guinea-Bissau 11°51′N 15°34′W
Result	Coup attempt fails: Plotters arrested; Opposition lawmakers connected to the coup

Belligerents
Guinea-Bissau: President of Guinea-Bissau; FARP (Factions); PAIGC	(Guinea-Bissau) Opposition: FARP (Factions); Alleged support PRD; RGB-MB

Commanders and leaders
João Bernardo Vieira; Robalo Gomes de Pina †	Mama Cassamá; Amadú Mané Alleged support João da Costa; Tagmé Na Waié
- Nexus of coup in Bissau (marked green), Guinea-Bissau

On March 17, 1993, Guinea-Bissau's capital, Bissau was rocked by a violent military mutiny, where several units led by Mama Cassamá attempted to overthrow the government of João Bernardo Vieira.

== Background ==
Guinea-Bissau achieved independence from Portugal in 1974 led by the Marxist-Leninist African Party for the Independence of Guinea and Cape Verde (PAIGC), and its military wing the Revolutionary Armed Forces of the People (FARP). Civilian rule would be short lived as a coup in 1980 saw João Bernardo Vieira emerge as the country's military dictator, however, his rule had been rocked by a string of failed counter-coup attempts in 1982, 1983, 1984 and 1985.

Vieira used these coup attempts to purge opposition lawmakers and generals, and to further centralize power around himself and his supporters primarily based in Bissau as the existing structure of PAIGC and FARP where decentralized rural councils akin to the guerilla cells during the Guinea-Bissau war of Independence. After the 1984 coup Vieira changed the constitution allowing for single-party elections to held later that year that saw the transition of the government away from a military Junta and towards Vieira's loyalists within PAIGC.

In 1991 Vieira again authorized the alteration of the constitution to introduce multi-party democracy which was opposed by PAIGC cadres. As such dozens of new small political parties where preparing to run in the election and for a genuine chance at power. The immediate catalyst for the revolt would be the fact soldiers had not been paid for months, and the benefits for war veterans would be slashed.

== Coup ==
On March 17, 1993, a series of mutinies broke out in military barracks in Bissau started by a junior officer named Mama Cassamá protesting the army's frozen pay. Vieira dispatched Major Robalo Gomes de Pina of the "Rapid Intervention Force", a specially created anti-coup unit, to subdue the mutinies, however, he would be shot dead by Sergeant Amadú Mané. Mané then went military-base to military-base to drum up support to topple Vieira, however, when the third base refused participate the insurrection fizzled out. Mané would be arrested as he was trying to flee the capital.

== Aftermath ==
Initially Vieira rejected that a coup attempt had taken place. After the coup attempt Vieira would arbitrarily arrest a number of high-ranking military officials, holding these prisoners incommunicado without any charge. Many of these officers would give forced confessions on national TV which was heavily criticized by Amnesty International.

The government would also connect a number of opposition politicians to the coup including João da Costa, the president of the PRD, the leading opposition candidate of the 1994 presidential election as well as Tagmé Na Waié the leader of the RGB-MB. In the investigation into the coup Mané claimed that João da Costa had orchestrated the coup, drugged him, and promised him the post of Minister of Defense if the coup were successful, da Costa rejected the allegations.

== See also ==
- 1980 Guinea-Bissau coup d'état
- 1982 Guinea-Bissau coup attempt
- 1983 Guinea-Bissau coup attempt
- 1984 Guinea-Bissau coup attempt
- 1985 Guinea-Bissau coup attempt
- 1998 Guinea-Bissau coup attempt
- Guinea-Bissau civil war
