= 1985 Guinea-Bissau coup attempt =

Failed coup against João Bernardo Vieira

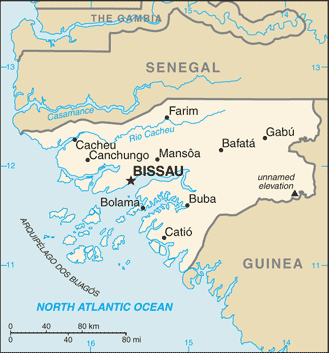
- Map of Guinea-Bissau.
Date	c.1985
Location	Bissau, Guinea-Bissau 11°51′N 15°34′W
Result	Coup attempt fails: Vice-President Paulo Correia executed; Attorney General Viriato Pa executed

Belligerents
Guinea-Bissau: President of Guinea-Bissau; FARP (Factions); PAIGC (Factions)	(Guinea-Bissau) Opposition: FARP (Factions); PAIGC (Factions)

Commanders and leaders
João Bernardo Vieira	Paulo Correia (executed); Viriato Pa (executed)

Casualties and losses
	12 plotters convicted, 6 executed (officially); 50+ arrested, 28+ executed
- Nexus of coup in Bissau (marked green), Guinea-Bissau

In 1986 the government of Guinea-Bissau announced the trial of 12 high ranking politicians and generals, including Vice-president Paulo Correia for plotting to stage a coup. However, some observers claim that the "coup plot" was just a justification for President João Bernardo Vieira to purge dissidents in the African Party for the Independence of Guinea and Cape Verde (PAIGC) and Revolutionary Armed Forces of the People (FARP).

== Background ==
João Bernardo Vieira, Guinea-Bissau's second president, had come to power himself in a coup in 1980 ousting his predecessor Luís Cabral due to his perceived loyalties to Cape Verde, which Guinea-Bissau had constitutionally enshrined as a "sister republic" striving towards the unification of the two states, and due to Cabral's embodiment of perceived mestiço economic and political dominance over blacks.

Paulo Correia was a senior guerrilla commander during the Guinea-Bissau War of Independence, and was installed as Vieira's vice-president during the 1980 coup, making him the second most powerful man in the country. However, Correia would emerge as a rival to Vieira and grew increasingly attracted to the concept of independence for his ethnic group, the Balanta. To this end he attempted to stage a coup in 1982 which was foiled.

In 1983 a group of young officers also attempted to stage a coup due to Vieira reducing the army's rice rations during a famine, after the arrest of their leadership, and the granting of the army a number of political concessions, they eventually backed down. From 1983 to 1984 Vieira was engaged in a power-struggle with his prime minister Saúde Maria, whom he forced into exile. Shortly after Correia began to voice opposition to a proposed International Monetary Fund stabilization project as being contrary to PAIGC's supposed Marxist-Leninist stance.

== Arrests ==
Correia and 11 others would be arrested and tried for treason in July 1986, for allegedly plotting a coup in 1985 during the IMF protests. All of the supposed plotters where political opponents to Vieira whom had originally been his allies in 1980. Additionally, all of the plotters where leading figures in the Balanta community, while Vieira and his loyalists where members of the Papel. Officially, only 6 plotters where given the death sentence, including Correia, however, dozens of ethnically Balanta officers would also face firing squads without trials. The United States Department of State puts the number of arrests closer to 50 and noted that at least 5 of the other plotters died in prison prior to the trial due to poor conditions, torture, or while trying to escape. Both Portuguese President Mário Soares and French President François Mitterrand appealed for clemency for Correia and the other plotters, to no avail. Vieira stated that the executions where "necessary" as Correia and other plotters "sought to incite ethnic divisions." A report by Ghana's Kofi Annan International Peacekeeping Training Centre concluded that there was likely no genuine coup plot which was instead a cover for Vieira to purge his opposition as part of routine power-struggles within PAIGC which had, until 1998, been kept out of public view with cover stories such as "foiled coups" in 1983 and 1993.

== Aftermath ==
A botched coup against Vieira would result in the Guinea-Bissau civil war in 1998, and by 1999 another coup would oust Vieira entirely. A mass grave was uncovered in 1999 containing the remains of 28 persons connected to the coup, including Vice President Paolo Correia, Attorney General Viriato Pa and several high ranking generals. The discovery of this mass grave shortly before the 1999–2000 Guinea-Bissau general election proved costly to PAIGC and Vieira's loyalists, who were seeking to emerge from the civil war as the dominant political force. Ultimately PAIGC would lose in a landslide to the Party for Social Renewal (PRS). Vieria would stage a political comeback, winning the 2005 election, however, he would be assassinated by a squad of soldiers March 2, 2009, the day after one of his largest rivals, army chief of staff General Batista Tagme Na Waie, was also assassinated in a bombing likely on Vieria's orders.

== See also ==
- 1980 Guinea-Bissau coup d'état
- 1982 Guinea-Bissau coup attempt
- 1983 Guinea-Bissau coup attempt
- 1984 Guinea-Bissau coup attempt
- 1993 Guinea-Bissau coup attempt
- 1998 Guinea-Bissau coup attempt
- Guinea-Bissau civil war
