= 1998 Guinea-Bissau coup attempt =

Guinea-Bissau coup attempt

- Part of Guinea-Bissau Civil War
Date	7 June 1998; 28 years ago
Location	Bissau, Guinea Bissau
Result	Failed coup attempt

Belligerents
(Guinea-Bissau) FARP	(Guinea-Bissau) Dissenting faction of the armed forces

Commanders and leaders
(Guinea-Bissau) João Bernardo Vieira	(Guinea-Bissau) Ansumane Mané

Strength
Unknown	Unknown

The 1998 Guinea-Bissau coup attempt was an attempted coup d'état against the government of João Bernardo Vieira by dissident elements of the military in Guinea-Bissau. Led by Brigadier-General Ansumane Mané, the coup attempt plunged the republic into the year-long Guinea-Bissau civil war, resulting in as many as thousands of deaths and the displacement of hundreds of thousands.

== Causes ==
The coup attempt followed President Vieira's dismissal of Brigadier-General Ansumane Mané as Chief of Staff over allegations of involvement in arms smuggling to the separatist Movement of Democratic Forces of Casamance (MFDC) in Senegal. Pressured by the governments of Senegal and France to identify the culprit, the president placed the blame on him despite remonstrations of innocence. Thus, President Vieira suspended Chief of Staff Mané for purported dereliction of duty. A report from an appointed committee tasked to investigate the scandal implied President Vieira was aware of the arms trafficking, leading Ansumane Mané to publicly accuse the president of agreeing to the illegal trade. As a result, the president replaced the Brigadier-General with Humbert Gomes as Chief of Staff on June 6, 1998.

== Coup attempt ==
A disgraced Ansumane Mané launched his coup the following day. Having gathered support from rebellious elements of the military long dissatisfied over issues of pay and government corruption, him and his forces seized control of the Bra Military Barracks Complex and the capital's airport in Bissau, proclaiming himself head of the Junta Militar afterwards - a transitional military council. Ansumane Mané called for Vieira's resignation and for fresh elections to be held.

Supported by some three thousand Senegalese and Guinean troops, government forces unsuccessfully tried retaking rebel-held territory, leading to heavy fighting. Around three thousand foreign nationals were evacuated, and approximately two hundred thousand residents fled Bissau.

On July 26, a truce mediated by the Community of Portuguese Language Countries (CPLP) was agreed upon. A month later on August 25, the existing truce was transformed into a cease-fire. Further talks in September and October failed, with the government rejecting rebel demands for withdrawal of Senegalese and Guinean troops, and the rebels in turn rejecting a proposal for a buffer zone. Fighting resumed in October in the capital and other cities, with the government imposing a nationwide curfew. By then, rebel forces controlled approximately 99% of the country.

On November 1, a peace accord mediated by the Economic Community of West African States (ECOWAS) was signed in Abuja, Nigeria. Included in the treaty were a formal ceasefire, the withdrawal of foreign troops, and the formation on a National Unity Government (NUG) with elections planned for March of the following year. In January 1999, hostilities resumed once again in the capital, displacing some two hundred and fifty thousand residents from the city. On February 9, a cease-fire agreement was reached. By mid-March, foreign troops had withdrawn from the country.

In May, President Vieira announced legislative and presidential elections would be held in December, yet he was later overthrown in a second coup on May 7 by the rebel military junta, leading President Vieira to seek asylum in Portugal. For a week-long period, Ansumane Mané became the country's temporary head of state. On May 14, Malam Bacai Sanhá was installed as acting president.

== See also ==
- 1980 Guinea-Bissau coup d'état
- 1982 Guinea-Bissau coup attempt
- 1983 Guinea-Bissau coup attempt
- 1984 Guinea-Bissau coup attempt
- 1985 Guinea-Bissau coup attempt
- 1993 Guinea-Bissau coup attempt
- Guinea-Bissau civil war
