= Revolutionary Armed Forces of the People (Guinea-Bissau) =

National army of Guinea-Bissau

- Forças Armadas Revolucionárias do Povo
- Military flag of Guinea-Bissau
- Founded: 1964 (as the military branch of PAIGC)
- Current form: 1973 (as the national armed forces of Guinea-Bissau)
- Service branches: Army; Navy; Air Force
- Headquarters: Bissau
- Website: farp.gw

Leadership
- Commander-in-Chief: Major general and General Horta Inta-A Na Man
- Prime Minister: Ilídio Vieira Té
- Minister of National Defense: General Stive Lassana Manssaly
- Chief of General Staff: Major general Tomas Djassi
- Deputy Chief of Staff: Unknown

Personnel
- Conscription: Selective compulsory military service
- Active personnel: 4,000

Expenditure
- Budget: $23.3 million
- Percent of GDP: 1.7%

Industry
- Foreign suppliers: China; Czech Republic; India; Portugal; France; Russia

Related articles
- History: Guinea-Bissau War of Independence; Guinea-Bissau Civil War; 2010 Guinea-Bissau military unrest 2012 Guinea Bissau coup d'état 2025 Guinea-Bissau coup d'état
- Ranks: Military ranks of Guinea-Bissau

The Revolutionary Armed Forces of the People (Portuguese: Forças Armadas Revolucionárias do Povo, abbr. FARP) is the national military of Guinea-Bissau. It consists of an army, a navy, an air force, and paramilitary forces. In 2022 the World Bank estimated that there were around 4,000 personnel in the armed forces. The estimated military expenditure is $23.3 million, and military spending as a percentage of GDP is 1.7%.

The World Fact Book reports that the military service age is 18–25 years of age for selective compulsory military service, and 16 years of age or younger for voluntary service, with parental consent.

== Origins ==
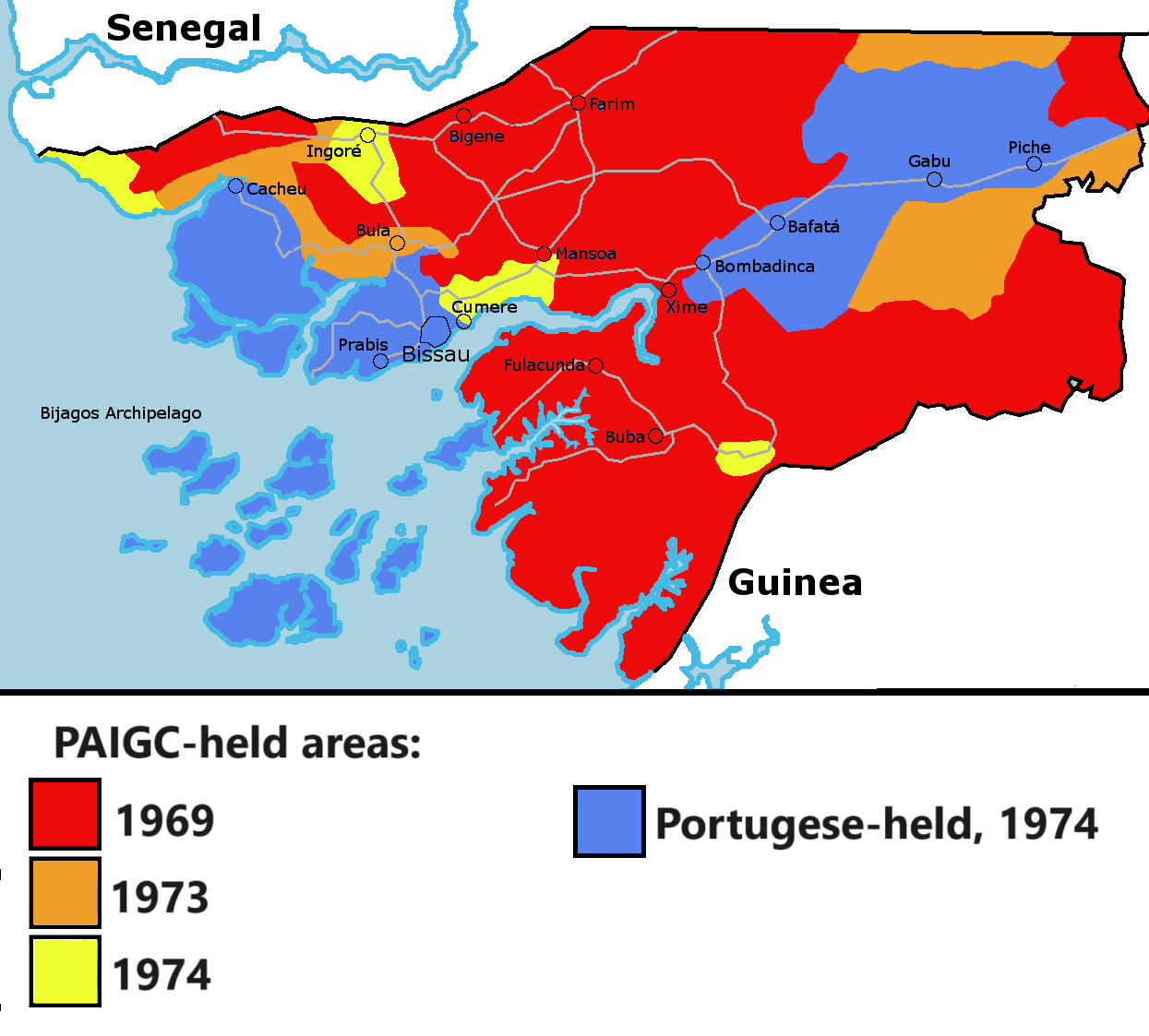
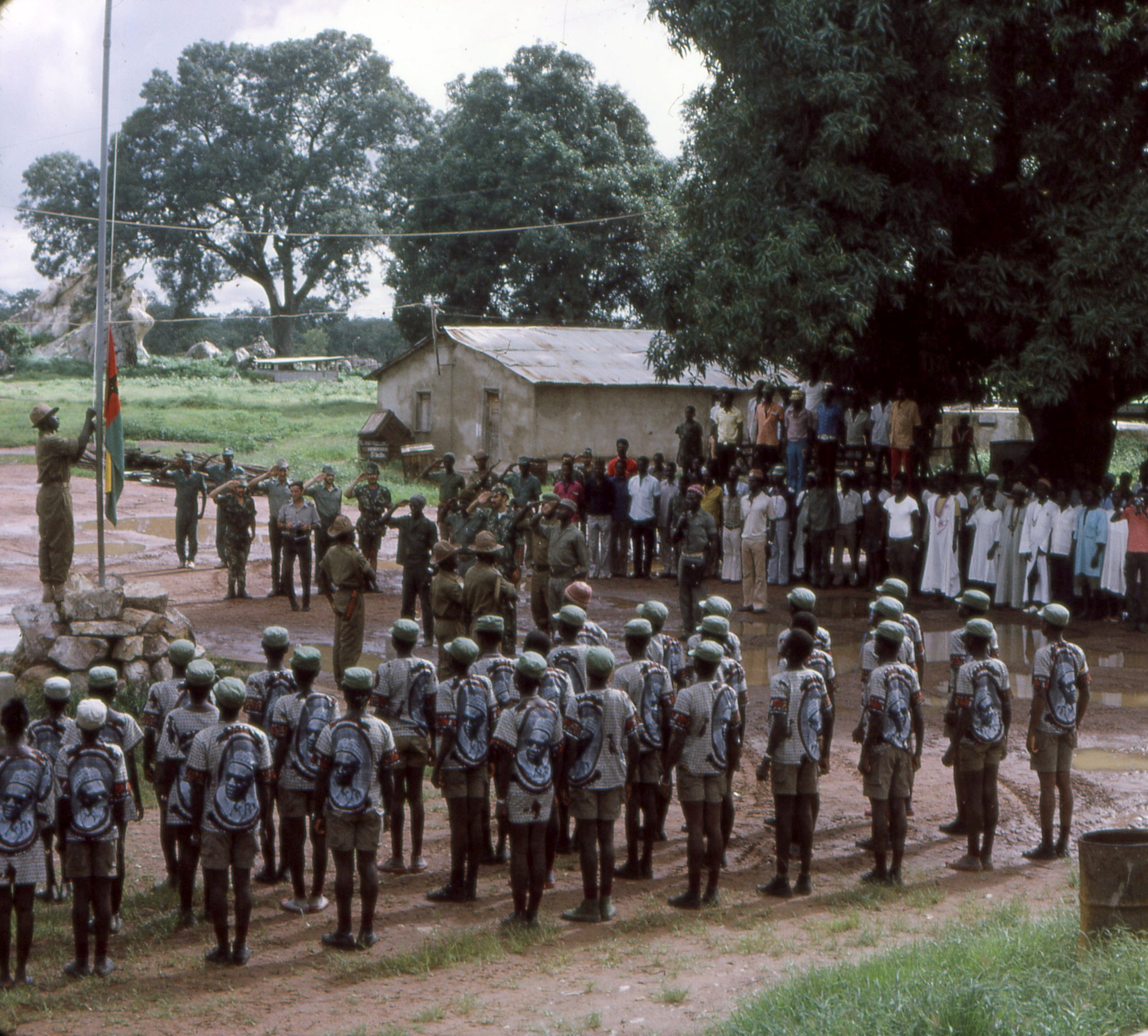
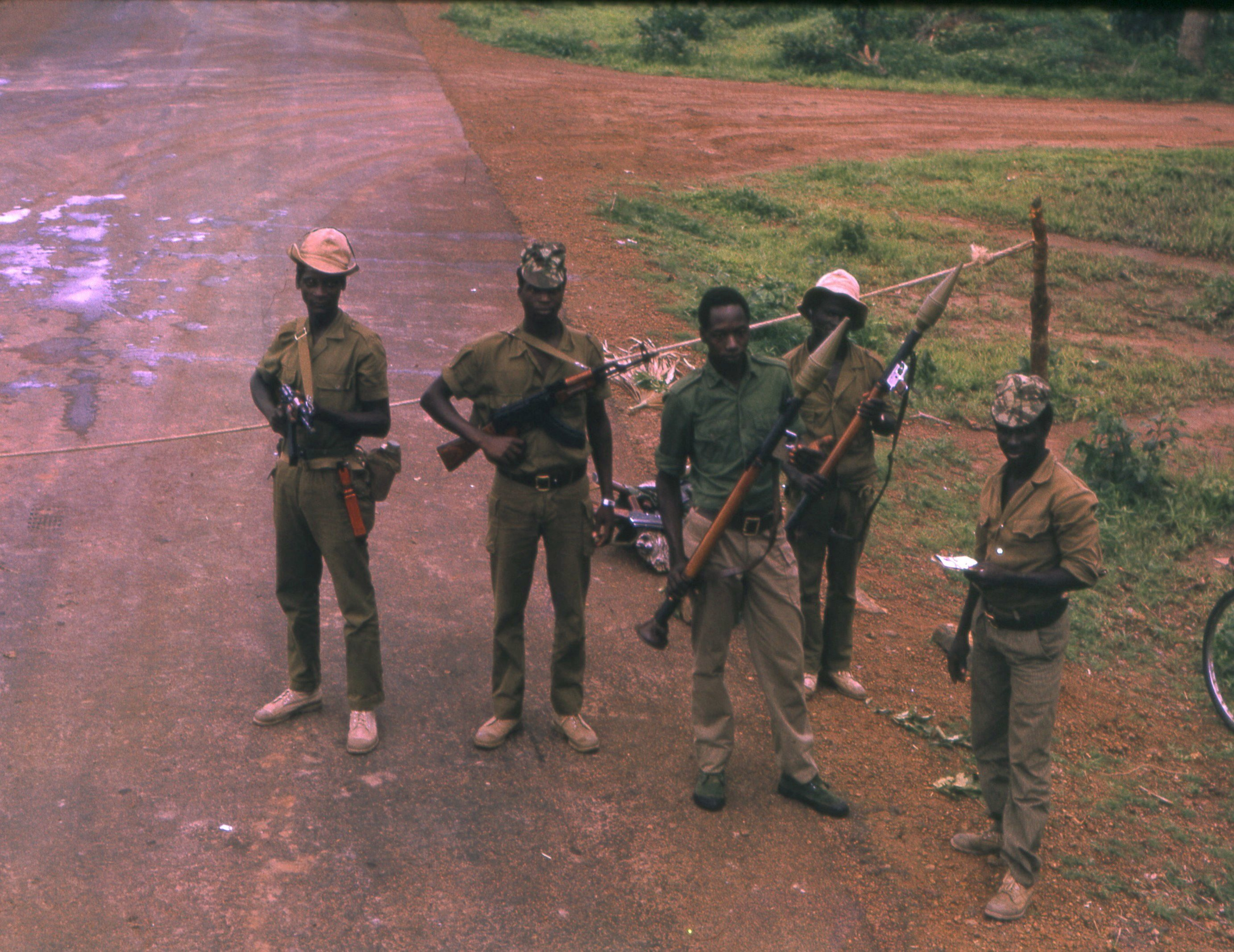
Territorial control in Guinea-Bissau shortly before the Carnation Revolution (left), members of FARP raising the flag of PAIGC in 1974 (center), FARP insurgents at a road checkpoint shortly after independence (right).

Unlike other European powers during the cold war which engaged in the policy of decolonization the Portuguese Estado Novo instead adopted the policy of Lusotropicalism, arguing that Portugal's colonies in Africa; Angola, Cape Verde, Guinea, Mozambique, and São Tomé and Príncipe, where integral parts of Portugal, inseparable from the mainland. As such, each of Portugal's colonial possessions suffered from major insurgencies in the form of the Portuguese Colonial Wars, as African Nationalist and Socialist groups where backed by the Soviet Union, Cuba, and other Communist states to secure their independence, and their geopolitical allegiance to the Second World. These African forces in Guinea and Cape Verde collaborated, forming the African Party for the Independence of Guinea and Cape Verde (PAIGC), with a militant wing, the Revolutionary Armed Forces of the People (FARP), seeking the independence of both nations as a unified state Guiné e Cabo Verde. However, the Guinea-Bissau War of Independence was fought exclusively in Guinea-Bissau, as Cape Verde remained a major Portuguese base supporting their armed forces fighting on the mainland.

The colonial war's unpopularity, and extensive cost in both men and materials on the Portuguese state, eventually led to the Carnation Revolution in Lisbon which saw the Estado Novo overthrown in favor of a socialist government, as such, one of the new government's first acts was to end the colonial wars by surrendering to the liberation movements. Despite their political and military leadership being united, PAIGC's goal of a unified state between Guinea-Bissau and Cape Verde failed as Portugal granted both colonies independence, Guinea-Bissau in 1974, and Cape Verde in 1975. PAIGC would rule both Guinea-Bissau and Cape Verde until a coup in Guinea-Bissau in 1980 where FARP elements there argued that the government was dominated by Cape Verde interests. As such, the Cape Verde wing of PAIGC would split, forming the African Party for the Independence of Cape Verde (PAICV) with its militant wing becoming the Cape Verdean Armed Forces effectively ending any prospective unification of the two states while PAIGC and FARP continued to rule in Guinea-Bissau.

== History ==
=== 1980 coup d'état ===
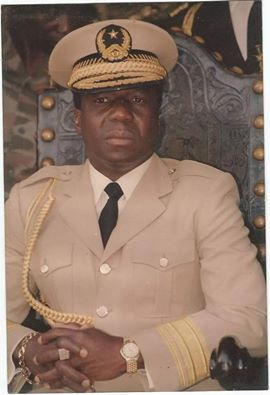
João Bernardo Vieira staged a coup in 1980 and would survive a string of failed counter coups in 1982, 1983, 1984, 1985, and 1993 before a coup in 1998 plunged the country into a civil war that ended when his own supporters ousted him in a final coup in 1999.

Following independence in 1974, Luís Cabral, the half brother of PAIGC leader Amílcar Cabral who was assassinated just months prior to independence, became the first President of Guinea-Bissau. A Cape Verdean and a mestiço, Cabral's rule would be resented by black nationalist elements of the FARP who viewed Cabral as the embodiment of mestiço economic and political dominance over black Guineans who retained leadership of FARP. João Bernardo Vieira, a black FARP officer who had been named Prime Minister in 1978, staged a bloodless coup against Cabral and seize control over Guinea-Bissau with FARP elements loyal to him. Vieira's new government would quickly be recognized by other West African nations, as a nine-member military Council of the Revolution approved a new constitution restoring governance back to PAIGC in 1984. A single-party "election" where only the PAIGC members could stand was held shortly after to establish a new civilian government. As a result of the coup Cape Verde cut ties and any prospective talk of unification with Guinea-Bissau on January 20, 1981. Aristides Pereira, President of Cape Verde, formally split from PAIGC forming the PAICV alongside several former high-ranking members of PAIGC's political bureau.

=== 1982 coup attempt ===
Following independence, both FARP and PAIGC operated on a decentralized structure, with local units exerting control over their neighborhoods. This network heavily favored the Balanta by virtue of them being the single largest ethnic group in the country. However Vieira, who was a Papel, sought to upend this Balanta-centric system and sought to reduce their political and military autonomy. In 1981 Vieira restructured PIAGC to be more centralized around the capital of Bissau, a Papal stronghold, which prompted extensive Balanta discontent. A Balanta war hero from the independence war, Paulo Correia, convinced the Bra tank battalion, stationed in Bissau's outskirts, to attempt a coup against the government. The battalion failed to secure the capital due to the presence of other FARP forces, and their commander was executed. Correia, who at the time was serving as the minister of the armed forces was dismissed and made the minister of rural development to minimize his influence on the army. However, Correia would ultimately attempt another coup in 1985 which also failed, resulting in him, and his allies, being executed.

=== 1983 coup attempt ===
A food shortage would rock Guinea-Bissau in 1983 and by June Vieira had no choice but to reduce the rice ration for FARP soldiers. Anger quickly mounted within FARP, with a clique of young officers threatening Vieira with a coup if he was unable to improve the situation. Meanwhile, Vieira also had military barriers installed across Bissau and invited a Soviet warship to dock in the city, keeping it stationed there for twice as long as it was authorized in case intervention against a coup attempt was needed. Commander Joao de Silva emerged as a leader for the young officers, and was removed from his post. In an attempt to appease the plotters he promised them new uniforms and political privileges, such as first call on rice, and priority over the rest of the population for oil and butter. de Silva and his supporters would be arrested thwarting the coup attempt.

=== 1984 coup attempt ===
Vieira restructured the political situation in the country around himself and his loyalists, replacing the "Revolutionary Council", the military Junta he established in 1980, with a civilian "Central Committee", however, this committee would also be stuffed with pro-Vieria loyalists. Pro-Balanta sentiments in the country, meanwhile, had not faded despite the foiled 1982 coup, with many Balanta officers still seeking an advancement of Balanta political power in the republic. Vieira sought to hold one-party PAIGC elections, however, would be routinely thwarted by Balanta underlings, namely Victor Saúde Maria who had been his foreign minister since 1981, and then prime minister since 1982. Saúde Maria and other Balanta officials viewed these one party elections as a brazen attempt to solidify power around Vieira and his Papel loyalists, but where unable to stop them being held in 1984. After the election Vieira accused Saúde Maria and high ranking Balanta FARP officers of plotting a coup and had them arrested, abolishing the office of vice-president and arresting Saúde Maria who would ultimately be allowed to flee the country in exile.

=== 1985 coup attempt ===
In 1986 the government of Guinea-Bissau announced the trial of 12 high ranking politicians and generals, including Vice-President Paulo Correia for plotting to stage a coup. However, some observers claim that the "coup plot" was just a justification for President João Bernardo Vieira to purge dissidents in the African Party for the Independence of Guinea and Cape Verde (PAIGC) and FARP.

=== Civil war ===
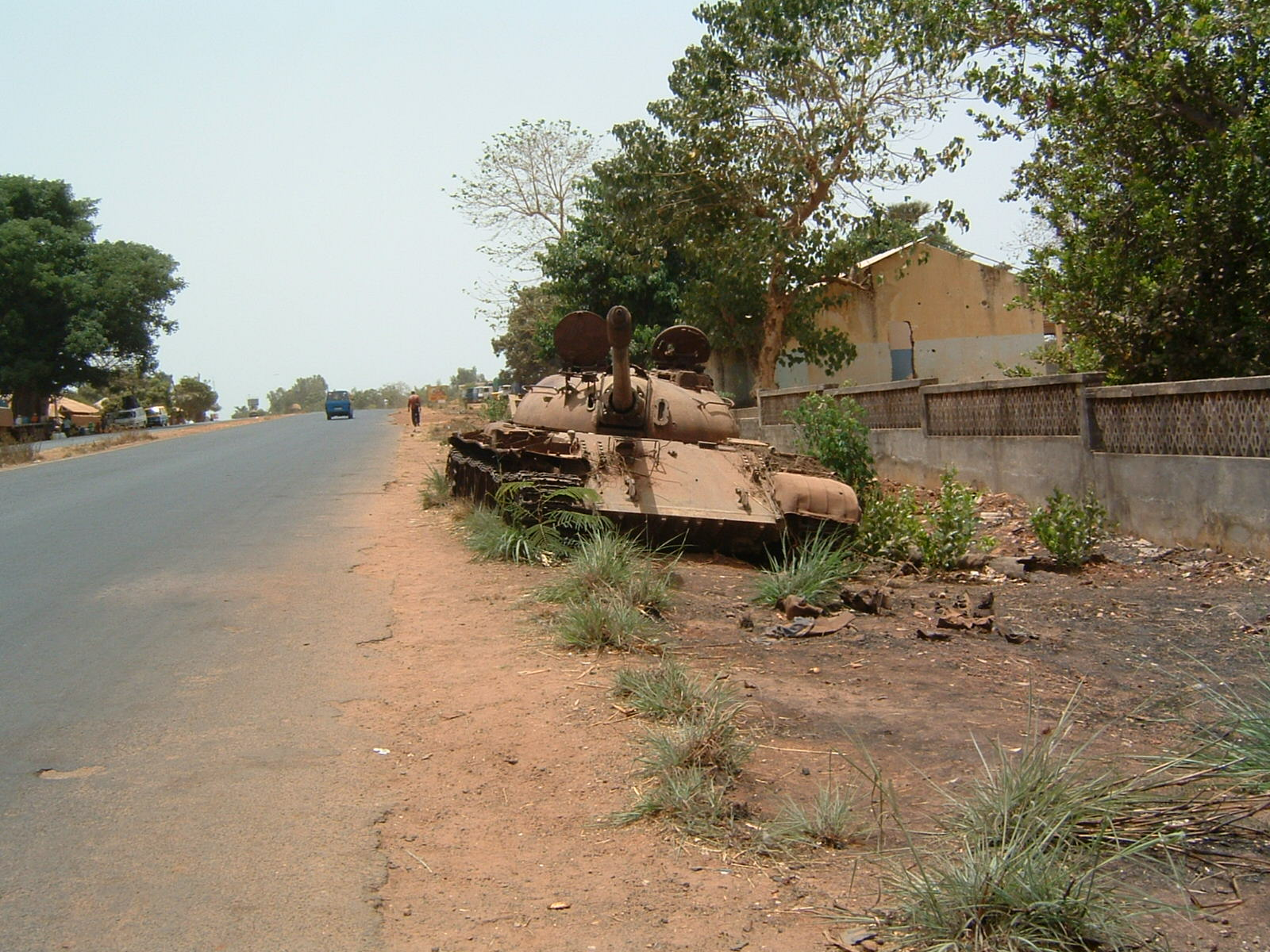
Internal divisions within FARP would eventually cause the Guinea-Bissau civil war (abandoned T-55 tank from the civil war pictured) which ultimately saw the ousting of João Bernardo Vieira.

=== 2003 coup d'état ===
The 2003 Guinea-Bissau coup d'état was a bloodless military coup that took place in Guinea-Bissau on 14 September 2003, led by General Veríssimo Correia Seabra against incumbent President Kumba Ialá. Seabra referred to the "incapacity" of Ialá's government as justification for the takeover, together with a stagnant economy, political instability, and military discontent over unpaid salaries. Ialá publicly announced his resignation on 17 September, and a political agreement signed that month prohibited him from participating in politics for five years. A civilian-led transitional government led by businessman Henrique Rosa and PRS secretary general Artur Sanhá was set up at the end of September.

=== 2010 military unrest ===
Major General Batista Tagme Na Waie was chief of staff of the Guinea-Bissau armed forces until his assassination in 2009.

Military unrest occurred in Guinea-Bissau on 1 April 2010. Prime Minister Carlos Gomes Júnior was placed under house arrest by soldiers, who also detained Army Chief of Staff Zamora Induta. Supporters of Gomes and his party, PAIGC, reacted to the move by demonstrating in the capital, Bissau; Antonio Indjai, the Deputy Chief of Staff, then warned that he would have Gomes killed if the protests continued.

The EU ended its mission to reform the country's security forces, EU SSR Guinea-Bissau, on 4 August 2010, a risk that may further embolden powerful generals and drug traffickers in the army and elsewhere. The EU mission's spokesman in Guinea-Bissau said the EU had to suspend its programme when the mastermind of the mutiny, General Antonio Indjai, became army chief of staff. "The EU mission thinks this is a breach in the constitutional order. We can't work with him".

=== 2011 coup attempt ===
The 2011 Guinea-Bissau coup attempt was a failed coup d'état by a group of renegade soldiers. Taking place on the morning of December 26, 2011, fighting broke out between two factions in the armed forces with sounds of automatic weapons and rocket fire erupting in the Santa Luzia army base which alarmed residents in the country's capital of Bissau. Officials claim it started when Navy Chief Jose Americo Bubo Na Tchuto sent orders to arrest Army Chief Antonio Injai, who was later freed by his men. Afterwards, the Army Chief in turn arrested the Navy Chief for his involvement in the incident however he denied issuing such orders to his troops. The coup failed, and 30 perpetrators were arrested, among them being the Navy Chief for "masterminding the coup."

=== International drug trade ===
The multitude of small offshore islands and a military able to sidestep government with impunity has made it a favourite trans-shipment point for drugs to Europe. Aircraft drop payloads on or near the islands, and speedboats pick up bales to go direct to Europe or onshore. UN chief Ban Ki-moon has called for sanctions against those involved in Guinea-Bissau's drugs trade.

Air Force head Ibraima Papa Camara and former navy chief Jose Americo Bubo Na Tchuto have been named "drug kingpins".

=== Angolan assistance ===
Angola, at the presidency of the Community of Portuguese Language Countries (CPLP) since 2010, has since 2011 participated in a military mission in Guinea-Bissau (MISSANG) to assist in the reform of defence and security. MISSANG had a strength of 249 Angolan men (both soldiers and police officers), following an agreement signed between the defence ministers of both countries, as a complement to a Governmental accord ratified by both parliaments.

The Angolan assistance mission included a programme of technical and military cooperation focused on a reform of the Guinean armed forces and police, including the repair of barracks and police stations, organisation of administrative services and technical and military training locally and in Angolan institutions. The mission was halted by the Angolan Government, following a politico-military crisis that led to the ousting of the interim president of Guinea-Bissau, Raimundo Pereira, and the prime minister, Gomes Júnior. By 22 June 2012, the Angolan vessel Rio M'bridge, carrying the mission's equipment, had arrived back in Luanda.

=== 2023 coup attempt ===
On 30 November 2023, clashes broke out in Bissau, the capital of Guinea-Bissau, between government forces and units of the National Guard who had released two ministers accused of corruption from detention. The clashes led to the arrest of National Guard commander Colonel Victor Tchongo. President Umaro Sissoco Embaló described the events as an attempted coup. Following the clashes, Embaló ordered the dissolution of the country's legislature.

=== American assistance ===
On November 24, 2024 it was announced that the United States Army was sending the 478th Civil Affairs Battalion to Guinea-Bissau as part of a SETAF-AF mission to aid their Guinean counterparts with medical readiness exercises, humanitarian activities, and join training sessions for a nine-month rotation.

=== 2025 coup d'état ===
On 26 November 2025, the president of Guinea-Bissau, Umaro Sissoco Embaló, was arrested as part of a coup d'état carried out by Head of the Military Office of the Presidency Brigadier General Dinis Incanha. Military officers declared "total control" over the country and established the High Military Command for the Restoration of National Security and Public Order. The coup occurred a day before the results of the 2025 Guinea-Bissau general election held on 23 November, in which Embaló was running for re-election, were expected to be officially announced.

== Equipment ==
Large parts of the equipment of the army of Guinean-Bissau are of Warsaw Pact origin.

== Air Force ==
After achieving independence from Portugal, the air force was formed by officers returning from training in Cuba and the Soviet Union. The FAGB was re-equipped by the Soviets with a limited aid package in which its first combat aircraft were introduced.

== Navy ==
In September 2010, Rear-Admiral Jose Americo Bubo Na Tchuto attempted a coup, but was arrested after failing to gain support. "Guinea-Bissau's navy chief, who was arrested last week and accused of trying to stage a coup, has escaped custody and fled to nearby Gambia, the armed forces said on Tuesday."
