= 1982 Guinea-Bissau coup attempt =

Failed coup against João Bernardo Vieira

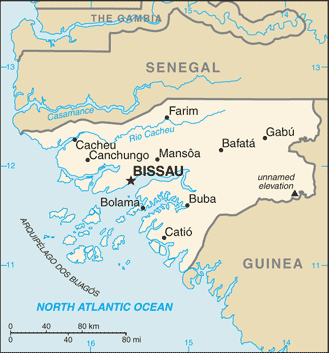
- Map of Guinea-Bissau.
Date	c. 1982
Location	Bissau, Guinea-Bissau 11°51′N 15°34′W
Result	Coup attempt fails: Bra tank battalion commander executed; Paulo Correia isolated from military command

Belligerents
Guinea-Bissau; President of Guinea-Bissau; FARP (Factions); PAIGC	(Guinea-Bissau) Opposition; FARP (Factions); Bra tank battalion

Commanders and leaders
João Bernardo Vieira	Paulo Correia
- Nexus of coup in Bissau (marked green), Guinea-Bissau

During the centralization of Guinea-Bissau high ranking Balanta officers attempted to overthrow President João Bernardo Vieira to prevent restructuring the state led by Paulo Correia.

== Prelude ==
Guinea-Bissau had declared independent from Portugal in 1973 following a long insurgency which was recognized by Portugal in 1974. A coup in 1980 would overthrow the first president of Guinea-Bissau, Luís Cabral, in favor of FARP General João Bernardo Vieira due to Cabral being a mestiço with black Guineans having grown increasingly disgruntled with perceived mestiço economic and political control.

Vieira sought to transform FARP's political wing, PAIGC into a genuine Vanguard Party in the Marxist Leninist style, consolidating the party from its highly decentralized and guerilla cell based structure into a hierarchical party to create a class of mobilized political professionals, which would extend the party's influence outside of the capital and into the more rural parts of the countryside.

=== Political crisis ===
However, the existing decentralized power-structure in PAIGC was heavily favored by the more rural Balanta which besides making up a majority of the country's population while Vieira was a Papel, also constituted the vast majority of the PAIGC's political base. Centralizing power around the urban elite in Bissau had been a goal that the PAIGC's political writers had been striving for since at least 1977, however, was always denied by the party's Balanta base.

In 1981 Vieira held the "Extraordinary Party Congress" wherein he created a 51-member Central Committee and 16 member Political Bureau to govern the party, all stuffed with his loyalists including 8 of the 9 members of the executive "Revolutionary Council", the ruling Junta that Vieira established after his coup. Paulo Correia was a military hero from the war for independence, and a Balanta nationalist seeking to make the Balanta the politically dominate ethnic group in the country.

== Coup ==
Correia was able to convince the Bra tank battalion, which was stationed to defend Bissau's outskirts, to move against the regime. The battalion failed to secure the capital due to the presence of other FARP forces, and their commander was executed. Viriato Pan, a Balanta lawyer and the Attorney General was arrested during the coup out of fear he might side with Correia.

== Aftermath ==
Correia, who at the time was serving as the minister of the armed forces was dismissed and made the minister of rural development in an effort to remove him from direct access to the army without provoking a hostile reaction from other Balanta officers. More concessions would be given to Correia as he was named vice president in 1984 in a clear effort to appease Balanta soldiers and officers, however, despite this, Correia, now joined by Pan, would attempt to stage another coup in 1985 which also failed. However, this time Vieira cracked down hard and Correia and Pan where executed, alongside dozens of Balanta officers in what was in effect a purge.

== See also ==
- 1980 Guinea-Bissau coup d'état
- 1983 Guinea-Bissau coup attempt
- 1984 Guinea-Bissau coup attempt
- 1985 Guinea-Bissau coup attempt
- 1993 Guinea-Bissau coup attempt
- 1998 Guinea-Bissau coup attempt
- Guinea-Bissau civil war
