= Ministry of National Defense (Guinea-Bissau) =

The Ministry of National Defense of Guinea-Bissau (Portuguese: Ministro da Defesa Nacional da Guiné-Bissau) is the government agency responsible for overseeing the national defense and security of the Republic of Guinea-Bissau. It is one of the key ministries in the Guinea-Bissau Government and plays a crucial role in the management of the Revolutionary Armed Forces of the People, the military of the country.

== List of ministers ==
- Umaru Djaló
- Iafai Camará (1982-1984)
- Filomena Mascarenhas Tipote (2003–2004)
- Daniel Gomes (2004-)
- Marciano Silva Barber (2007 to 2009)
- Helder Proença
- Baciro Djá (2011-2012)
- Cadi Mané (9 July 2014 - 2015)
- Eduardo Costa Sanhá (June 2016 - January 16, 2018)
- Dionísio Cabi (21 August 2024 - December 1, 2025)
- General Stive Lassana Manssaly (December 1, 2025 - Present)

== See also ==
- Government of Guinea-Bissau
