= Paulo Correia (politician) =

Bissau-Guinean politician

Vice President of Guinea-Bissau
- In office May 1984 – November 1985
- President: João Bernardo Vieira
- Preceded by: Victor Saúde Maria
- Succeeded by: Iafai Camará as Vice President of the Revolutionary Council

Personal details
- Born: 1942
- Died: 1986 (aged 43–44)
- Party: PAIGC

Colonel Paulo Alexandre Nunes Correia was a Bissau-Guinean politician from PAIGC.

He was born as Cadé in 1942 and was a member of the Balanta ethnic group.

Correia made a name for himself as a senior commander of FARP during the Guinea-Bissau war of Independence earning him a loyal clique of officers.

Correia was Vice President and minister of justice After the 1980 coup d'état organized by João Bernardo Vieira. He was appointed minister of the armed forces from 1980 to 1982 and minister of justice from 1982 to 1984.

In 1983 Correia had plotted to stage a coup against Vieira with the ultimate goal of either turning Guinea-Bissau into a Balanta nation-state or seeking the independence of a Balanta nation. In response to the plot Vieira executed a number of Balanta generals, including Correia's senior supporters, resulting in the coup fizzling out.

Following unrelated coup attempts in 1983 and 1984 Correia was the centerpiece of yet another coup in 1985. He was sentenced to death and executed in July 1986.
