= Hala Hotel & Aqua Park =

Hotel in Bissau, Guinea-Bissau

Coordinates: 11.860438291600202°N 15.622038605116671°W

Hala Hotel & Aqua Park is a hotel and water park in Bissau, Guinea-Bissau.

The hotel opened in 1989, as the Bissau Sheraton Hotel. It left Sheraton in 1992 and was renamed the Hotel Hotti Bissau. It closed in 1998, as a result of the Guinea-Bissau Civil War, during which the rebels used it as a headquarters. As of 1998 it had 165 rooms and 15 suites. It was acquired by the Libyan African Investment Company (LAICO) in 2004 and reopened in 2005 as the Libya Hotel. It was later renamed the LAICO Bissau Hotel. In 2015 it was renovated, and reopened in January 2016 within LAICO's business-class Ledger Plaza brand as the Ledger Plaza Hotel Bissau. In 2021, the hotel was received by an investment agreement between LAICO Bissau and MTM Bissau and changed the brand to Hala Hotel & Aqua Park.
