= Paulo Correia =

Paulo Correia may refer to:

- Paulo Correia (politician) (1942–1986), Guinea Bissau politician
- Paulo Roberto Correia (born 1960), Brazilian sprinter
