= Carmen Pereira =

Bissau-Guinean politician

President of Guinea-Bissau Acting
- In office 14 May 1984 – 16 May 1984
- Prime Minister: Victor Saúde Maria
- Preceded by: João Bernardo Vieira
- Succeeded by: João Bernardo Vieira

Personal details
- Born: 22 September 1936 Bissau, Portuguese Guinea
- Died: 4 June 2016 (aged 79) Bissau, Guinea-Bissau
- Party: PAIGC
- Spouse: Umaru Djaló

Carmen Maria de Araújo Pereira (22 September 1936 – 4 June 2016) was a Bissau-Guinean politician. She served three days as Acting President in 1984, becoming the first woman in this role in Africa and the only one in Guinea-Bissau's history. She had the shortest term as the Acting President, serving only three days in office. She died in Bissau on 4 June 2016.

== Early life ==
Carmen Pereira was the daughter of one of the few African lawyers in the then Portuguese colony. She married at a young age, and both she and her husband became involved in the Guinea-Bissau War of Independence against Portugal following the 1958–61 wave of Decolonization which liberated Guinea-Bissau's neighbors from European rule.

== Independence struggle ==
Pereira's political involvement began in 1962, when she joined the African Party for the Independence of Guinea and Cape Verde (PAIGC), a revolutionary movement that sought independence for Portugal's two colonies in West Africa. She and her husband were both active in the party. She was married to Umaru Djaló., who had been involved in the party longer, and she had married young. In 1966, the PAIGC Central Committee began mobilizing women on an equal basis as men, and Pereira became a revolutionary leader, a Political Officer, and a commander.

While very few women fought in the front lines, the PAIGC was exceptional it pushing for greater gender equality in a society with strongly defined sex roles. Other such women leaders who emerged from this effort in the PAIGC included Teodora Inácia Gomes, and most famously, Titina Silla. Pereira became a high-ranking political leader and delegate to the Pan-African Women's Organization in Algeria. Compelled to leave the country, she lived in Senegal before traveling to the Soviet Union to study medicine.

== Politician ==
Later, on her return to Guinea-Bissau, she was active both in health and political matters. She was elected to the People's National Assembly. She was Deputy President of the assembly from 1973-84.

Between 1975 and 1980, she served as the Assembly's chair during the government of João Bernardo Vieira. From 1981 to 1983 Pereira was Minister of Health and Social Affairs of Guinea-Bissau. Again chosen President of the People's National Assembly from 1984, she left this post in 1989 to become a Member the Council of State.

As President of the National Assembly, she was Acting President of Guinea-Bissau from 14 to 16 May 1984 as a new constitution was introduced.

Pereira served as a Member the Council of State from 1989 to 1990, and was Minister of State for Social Affairs in 1990 and 1991. This last made her Deputy Prime Minister of Guinea-Bissau for more than a year. She was dismissed by Vieira in 1992.

Political offices
| Preceded by João Bernardo Vieira | President of Guinea-Bissau; Acting; 1984 | Succeeded by João Bernardo Vieira |
