= Umaru Djaló =

Bissau-Guinean politician

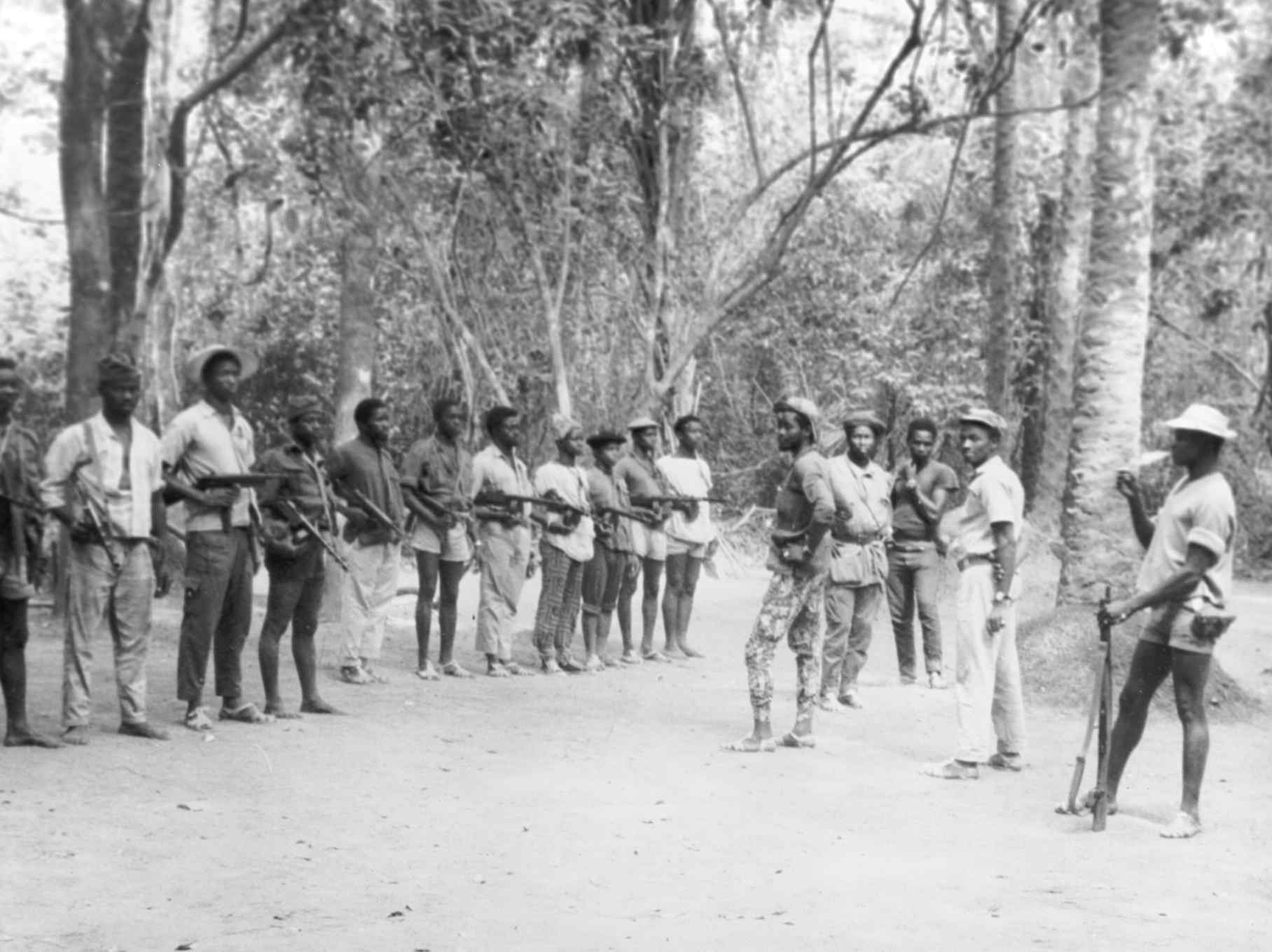
- Djaló in 1960s

Vice President of Guinea-Bissau
- In office 28 September 1978 – November 1980
- President: Luís Cabral
- Preceded by: João Bernardo Vieira
- Succeeded by: Victor Saúde Maria
- In office September 1973 – 13 March 1977
- President: Luís Cabral
- Preceded by: Position established
- Succeeded by: João Bernardo Vieira

Personal details
- Born: 1940
- Died: 2014 (aged 73–74)
- Political party: PAIGC
- Spouse: Carmen Pereira

Commandant Umaru Djaló was a Bissau-Guinean politician from PAIGC.

Djaló was born in 1940. He joined PAIGC and guerilla war against the Portuguese in the Guinea-Bissau War of Independence. He was the Minister of Armed Forces in the cabinet of Luís Cabral. Djaló was appointed as Vice President from 1973 to 1977, and again since September 1978 until the coup d'état of João Bernardo Vieira in November 1980. He was detained after the coup up at least until 1985. He died in May 2014.

Djaló was married to Carmen Pereira.
