= Biague Na Ntan =

Bissau-Guinean general (born 1950)

Chief of General Staff of the Revolutionary Armed Forces of the People
- In office 2014 – 26 November 2025
- Preceded by: Unknown
- Succeeded by: Tomas Djassi

Personal details
- Born: 12 June 1950 (age 76) Bambadinca, Bafatá Region, Guinea-Bissau
- Education: Odesa Military Academy

Military service
- Branch/service: Revolutionary Armed Forces of the People

Biague Na N'Tan is a Bissau-Guinean general who has served as the Chief of Staff of the Revolutionary Armed Forces of the People of Guinea-Bissau since 2014.

An ethnic Balanta, he was born in Bissau to Clusse Na N'Tan and Insanhe Na Camine, and joined the Revolutionary Armed Forces of the People, the armed wing of the African Party for the Independence of Guinea and Cape Verde, on July 20, 1963. He attended institutions such as the Tactical-Operational Command Course in the Republic of Cuba, the Odesa Higher Military Joint Command School in what is now Odesa, Ukraine, and the Frunze Military Academy in Moscow.

Na N'Tan served as Coordinator of the Assurance Team and member of the Commission for Money Exchange, facilitating Guinea-Bissau's integration into the West African Monetary Zone under the Central Bank of West African States from 1997 to 1998. He later assumed leadership positions within the Fiscal Guard, including Deputy Head of the Operations Department, Head of the Fiscal Guard Operations Department, and Chief of Staff of the Fiscal Guard.

Na N'Tan's influence expanded as he rose to the position of General Commander of the Fiscal Guard (Tax Action Brigade) at the General Directorate of Customs from 2006 to 2012. Following this, he served as Vice Chief of Staff of the Army until 2014. Na N'Tan played pivotal roles in ensuring smooth transitions within the government, serving as Coordinator of the Central Commission for Revenue Collection in the Public Treasury and Head of the Military House of the Presidency of the Republic.

From 2014, Na N'Tan has held the position of Chief of the General Staff of the Armed Forces. He was arrested during the 2025 Guinea-Bissau coup d'état on 26 November.

== See also ==
- 2010 Guinea-Bissau military unrest
