= Military ranks of Guinea-Bissau =

The Military ranks of Guinea-Bissau are the military insignia used by the Military of Guinea-Bissau.

== Commissioned officer ranks ==
The rank insignia of commissioned officers.

Rank group	General / flag officers				Senior officers			Junior officers
Army of Guinea-Bissau
Army of Guinea-Bissau	General	Tenente-general	Major-general	Brigadeir-general	Coronel	Tenente-coronel	Major	Capitão	Primeiro tenente	Tenente	Subtenente
Navy of Guinea-Bissau
Navy of Guinea-Bissau	Almirante	Vice-almirante	Contra-almirante	Comodoro	Capitão de mar e guerra	Capitão de fragata	Capitão-tenente	Primeiro-tenente	Segundo-tenente		Guarda-marinha/ Subtenente
Rank group	General / flag officers				Senior officers			Junior officers

== Other ranks ==
The rank insignia of non-commissioned officers and enlisted personnel.

Rank group	Senior NCOs		Junior NCOs	Enlisted
Army of Guinea-Bissau
Army of Guinea-Bissau	Primeiro-sargento	Segundo-sargento	Terceiro-sargento	Primeiro-Soldado	Soldado
Rank group	Senior NCOs		Junior NCOs	Enlisted

== Military branch of the African Party for the Independence of Guinea and Cape Verde (PAIGC) ==
=== Commissioned ===
The rank insignia for commissioned personnel for the former military branch of the African Party for the Independence of Guinea and Cape Verde.

Rank group	General / flag officers	Senior officers			Junior officers
Military of the PAIGC
Military of the PAIGC	Comandante de brigada	Primeiro comandante	Comandante	Major	Capitão	Primeiro tenente	Tenente	Subtenente

=== Enlisted ===
The rank insignia for enlisted personnel for the former military branch of the African Party for the Independence of Guinea and Cape Verde.

Rank group	Senior NCOs	Junior NCOs	Enlisted
