= JAAC =

JAAC may refer to:

- Jharkhand Area Autonomous Council, in India
- The Japanese American Archival Collection, created by Mary Tsukamoto at California State University at Sacramento
- Jammu Kashmir Joint Awami Action Committee (JKJAAC), more commonly known as the Joint Awami Action Committee, a sociopolitical organization based in Pakistan-administered Azad Kashmir
- The Journal of Aesthetics and Art Criticism, a quarterly peer-reviewed academic journal
- the Judicial Appointments Advisory Committee, in Ontario, Canada
- African Youth Amílcar Cabral (Portuguese: Juventude Africana Amílcar Cabral), the youth wing of PAIGC in Guinea-Bissau, founded in 1974

== See also ==
- Journal of the American Academy of Child and Adolescent Psychiatry
