= Guinea-Bissau Air Force =

- Força Aérea da Guiné-Bissau
- Founded: 1974; 52 years ago
- Country: Guinea-Bissau
- Type: Air force
- Role: Aerial warfare
- Part of: Revolutionary Armed Forces of the People
- Headquarters: Bissau

Insignia
- Roundel

Aircraft flown
- Transport: Cessna 208

The Guinea-Bissau Air Force (Portuguese: Força Aérea da Guiné-Bissau) is the air force arm of the military of Guinea-Bissau.

== History ==
On leaving Bissau by 1973–74, the Portuguese Air Force left three North American T-6Gs, nine C-47 Skytrains, two Dornier Do 27s, and two Aérospatiale Alouette IIIs. After achieving independence from Portugal, the air force was formed by officers returning from training in Cuba and the USSR. The FAGB was re-equipped with eight or ten MiG-17Fs and two MiG-15UTIs supplied by East Germany and the Soviet Union.

In 1978 France provided more aircraft aid in the form of a Reims-Cessna FTB.337 for coastal patrol and a surplus Alouette II. A Dassault Falcon 20F was donated by the Angolan government but was soon sold to the USA. In 1978, the Soviet Union provided a Mil Mi-8T helicopter as aid. In 1986, the Soviets delivered seven MiG-21bis fighters and MiG-21UM trainer aircraft.

The force's title was changed to Força Aérea da Guiné-Bissau (FAGB) after the outbreak of the civil war in 1998. Cooper and Weinert state 'when sighted for the last time in...1991, most of the [MiG] fleet was in 'storage' inside several hangars on the military side of Bissalanca IAP (Osvaldo Vieira International Airport), and in a deteriorating condition.'

By 2011, Guinea-Bissau had two 'probably' non-operational MiG-17s and a MiG-15UTI, while its MiG-21s and fixed-wing transport aircraft were withdrawn from service, leaving only an Aérospatiale Alouette II and a couple of Alouette IIIs for liaison.

== Aircraft ==
=== Current inventory ===
The Air Force has only a Cessna 208B as of 2023.

Former inventory: Mikoyan-Gurevich MiG-15, Mikoyan-Gurevich MiG-17, Mikoyan-Gurevich MiG-21, Aérospatiale Alouette II, Aérospatiale Alouette III, Dassault Falcon 20, Dornier Do 27, North American T-6 Texan, Reims-Cessna FTB.337, Douglas C-47 Skytrain, Antonov An-24, Mil Mi-8.

== Bibliography ==
- Cooper, Tom; Weinert, Peter (2010). African MiGs: Angola to Ivory Coast. Harpia Publishing. ISBN 978-0-9825339-5-6.
