= Aristide Menezes =

- Born: 1947
- Died: 7 February 1994 (aged 46–47); Lisbon, Portugal
- Occupation: politician
- Known for: led the Democratic Front
- Notable work: helped organize the first public protests after President Joao Bernardo Vieira seized control in 1980

Aristide Menezes (1947 – 7 February 1994) was a political figure in Guinea-Bissau who led the Democratic Front, the first opposition party to be legalized. He died leaving his wife and seven children behind.

== Life and career ==
Menezes helped organize the first public protests after President Joao Bernardo Vieira seized control in 1980 in a coup against the country's first post-independence government, which had ruled since 1975.

== Death ==
He died after a long illness in Lisbon, Portugal.
