= Guinea-Bissau Civil War =

1998–99 war that deposed President Vieira

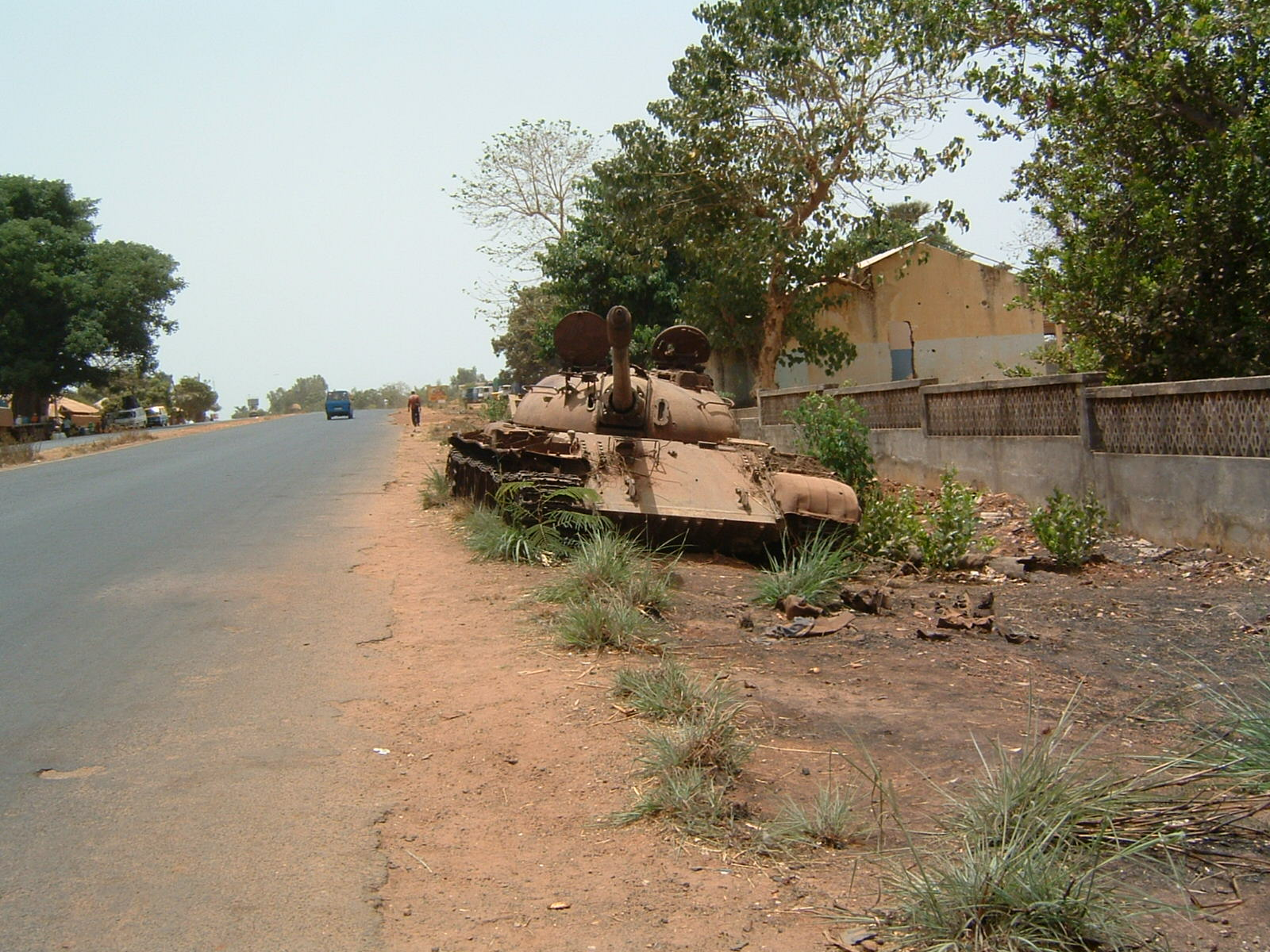
- An abandoned T-55 from the civil war in Bissau, 2003
Date	7 June 1998 – 10 May 1999
Location	Guinea-Bissau
Result	Ousting of President João Bernardo Vieira

Belligerents
Guinea-Bissau; Senegal; Guinea	Military rebels MFDC

Commanders and leaders
(Guinea-Bissau) João Bernardo Vieira (Senegal) Abdou Diouf (Guinea) Lansana Conté	Ansumane Mané

Strength
Government: Unknown; Senegal: 1,300; Guinea: 400	Unknown

Casualties and losses
Unknown	Unknown
- Total: At least 655 killed in fighting, 350,000 displaced

The Guinea-Bissau Civil War was fought from 7 June 1998 to 10 May 1999 and was triggered by an attempted coup d'état against the government of President João Bernardo Vieira led by Brigadier-General Ansumane Mané. Government forces, backed by neighbouring states, clashed with the coup leaders who had quickly gained almost total control over the country's armed forces.

The conflict resulted in the deaths of hundreds if not thousands of people and the displacement of hundreds of thousands.

An eventual peace agreement in November 1998 provided for a national unity government and new elections in the next year. However, a subsequent and brief outbreak of fighting in May 1999 ended with the deposing of Vieira on 10 May 1999 when Vieira signed an unconditional surrender.

== Pre-conflict tension ==
Guinea-Bissau gained independence from Portugal in 1974 after an eleven-and-a-half-year-long war of independence. In January 1998, ten fighters from the Movement of Democratic Forces of Casamance (MDFC), an insurgent separatist group from the Senegalese region of Casamance, were killed and another forty were arrested following clashes with the armed forces in two towns on the northern border of Guinea-Bissau.

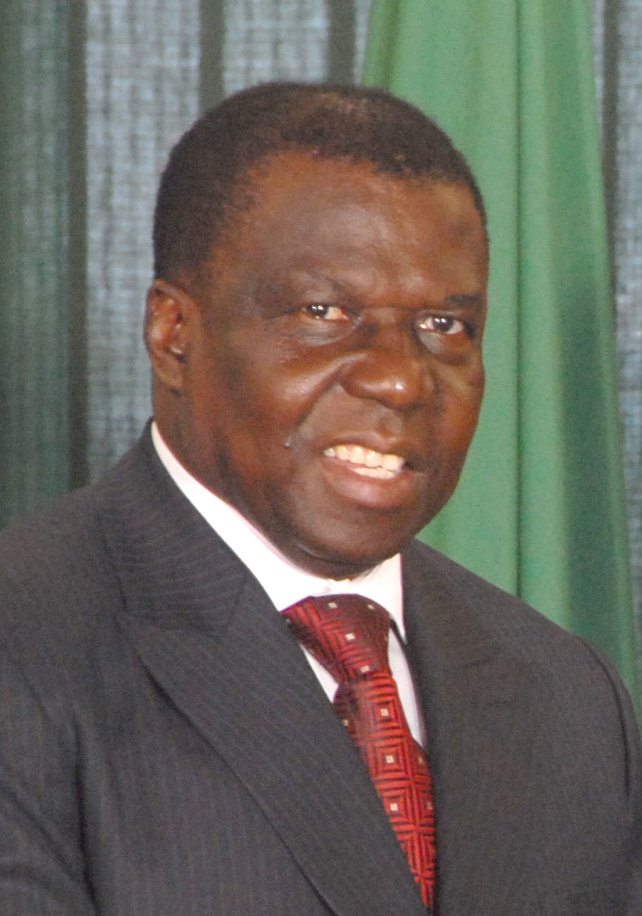
João Bernardo "Nino" Vieira, President of Guinea-Bissau (1980–1999)

The armed forces deployed reinforcements along the border with Casamance to prevent the separatists from entering the country. In late January, following the seizure in Guinea-Bissau of a cache of weapons, a number of officers of the armed forces were arrested on charges of supplying arms to the Casamance separatists.

On 30 January 1998, Guinea-Bissau's defense minister announced the suspension of the chief of staff of the armed forces, Brigadier-General Ansumane Mané on the grounds of dereliction of duty as the weapons impounded in the previous month had been taken from a military depot of the Guinea-Bissau armed forces.

In March 1998, following protest by opposition parties at delays in the organization of legislative elections, an independent national elections commission was established. The elections were due to be held in July. In April, Mané publicly accused the Minister of Defense and a group of officers in the armed forces of involvement in arms trafficking to the Casamance separatists. At the sixth PAIGC congress held May 1998, President João Bernardo Vieira was re-elected president of the party.

== Coup and civil war (1998–1999) ==
Vieira dismissed the suspended Mané and appointed General Humberto Gomes to replace him on 6 June 1998. On 7 June, rebelling troops led by Ansumane Mané seized control of military barracks in Bissau as well as other strategic locations including the international airport. Mané subsequently demanded the resignation of Vieira and his administration and the conduct of free and democratic elections in July. With the support of 1,300 Senegalese and 400 Guinean soldiers, troops loyal to the government attempted unsuccessfully to regain control of rebel held areas of the city and heavy fighting ensued.

Documentary footage shows armored vehicles saw combat with the mostly rebel-aligned Guinea-Bissau armed forces and intervening Guinean troops deploying PT-76, T-34-85 and T-54 tanks, with several knocked out. Panhard AML-90 armored cars were also employed by Senegalese troops.

In the following days more than 3,000 foreign nationals were evacuated from the capital by ship to Senegal. An estimated further 200,000 residents of Bissau fled the city, prompting fears of a humanitarian disaster, with the hostilities preventing aid organizations from distributing emergency food and medical supplies to the refugees. Fighting continued into July, with many members of the Guinea-Bissau armed forces reportedly defecting to the rebels. Portuguese marines were dispatched to occupy Bissau to both rescue Portuguese citizens and attempt to force a ceasefire.

On 26 July, following mediation by a delegation from the Community of Portuguese Language Countries (CPLP), the government and the rebels agreed to implement a truce enforced by the Portuguese, still occupying Bissau and other major urban centers. On 25 August, representatives of the government and the rebels met under the auspices of the CPLP and ECOWAS on Sal Island, Cape Verde, where an agreement was reached to transform the existing truce into a cease-fire. The accord provided for the reopening of the international airport and for the deployment of international forces to maintain and supervise the cease-fire.

In September 1998, talks between the government and the rebels resumed in Abidjan, Côte d'Ivoire. The rebels demanded that all Senegalese and Guinean forces be withdrawn from the country as a precondition to a definitive peace agreement, which was rejected by the government. The rebels, in turn, rejected a proposal for the establishment by Senegal of a buffer zone within Guinea-Bissau territory along the border with Casamance.

In October the rebels agreed to a government proposal for the creation of a demilitarized zone separating the opposing forces in the capital. Before the proposal could be formally endorsed, the cease-fire collapsed as fighting erupted in the capital and several other towns. On 20 October, the government imposed a nationwide curfew, and on the following day President Vieira declared a unilateral cease-fire.

By that time almost all of the government troops had defected to the side of rebel forces, which were believed to control approximately 99% of the country. On 23 October, Brigadier-General Mané agreed to observe a 48-hour truce to allow Vieira time to clarify his proposals for a negotiated peace settlement and agreement was subsequently reached for direct talks to be held in Banjul, the Gambia. At the talks, which took place on 29 October, the rebels confirmed that they would not seek Vieira's resignation.

Further talks held under the aegis of ECOWAS in Abuja, Nigeria, resulted in the signing of a peace accord on 1 November. Under the accord's terms, the two sides reaffirmed the cease-fire of 25 August and resolved that the withdrawal of Senegalese and Guinean troops from Guinea-Bissau be conducted simultaneously with the deployment of an ECOMOG (ECOWAS Cease-fire Monitoring Group) interposition force, which would guarantee security on the border with Senegal.

It was also agreed that a Government of National Unity would be established to include rebel representatives and that presidential and legislative elections would be held no later than March 1999. In early November 1998, an agreement was reached on the composition of a joint executive commission to implement the peace accord. Later that month the commission approved the structure of the new government, which was to comprise ten ministers and seven secretaries of state.

On 3 December, Francisco Fadul was appointed Prime Minister and later that month Vieira and Mané reached agreement on the allocation of portfolios to the two sides. The first contingent of 100 ECOMOG troops arrived in late December. At the same time, the United Nations Security Council adopted Resolution 1216 which called for both parties to form a government of national unity and hold elections by the end of March 1999.

=== 1999 ===
In January 1999, Fadul announced that presidential and legislative elections would not take place in March as envisaged in the Abuja accord, and would be delayed until the end of the year. Also in January, agreement was reached among the government, rebels and ECOWAS on the strength of the ECOMOG interposition force, which was to comprise some 710 troops. Agreement was also reached on a timetable for the withdrawal of Senegalese and Guinean troops from Guinea-Bissau.

At the end of January 1999, hostilities resumed in the capital resulting in numerous fatalities and the displacement of some 250,000 residents. On 9 February, talks between the government and the rebels produced agreement on a cease-fire that provided for the immediate withdrawal of Senegalese and Guinean troops.

At a meeting held in Lomé, Togo on 17 February, João Bernardo Vieira and Ansumane Mané pledged never again to resort to armed conflict. On 20 February the new Government of National Unity was announced. The disarmament of rebel troops and those loyal to the president, as provided for under the Abuja accord, began in early March. The withdrawal of Senegalese and Guinean troops was completed that month following an extension of the deadline from 28 February to 16 March, owing to logistical problems.

In April, a report was released by the National People's Assembly, which exonerated Mané on charges of trafficking arms to the Casamance rebels. Although the report, which had been due for release in June 1998 when hostilities began, called for the reinstatement of Mané as Chief of Staff of the armed forces, it revealed that President Vieira's presidential guard had been heavily implicated in arms trafficking. The United Nations Peacebuilding Support Office in Guinea-Bissau was subsequently established to monitor the general elections and the implementation of the Abuja Agreement.

=== Second coup (May 1999) ===
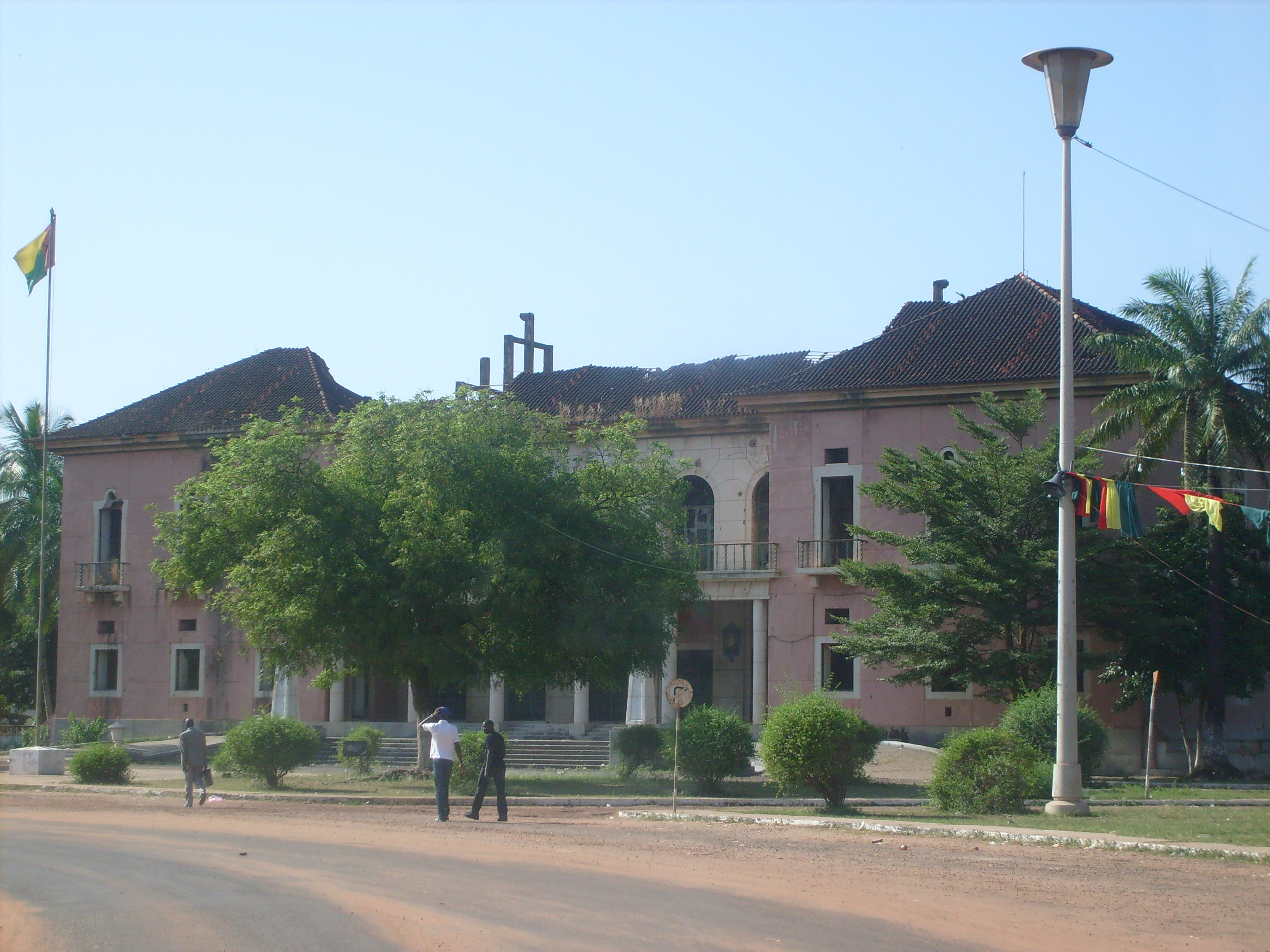
The war-damaged and abandoned former presidential palace in the capital, Bissau

In early May 1999, Vieira announced that legislative and presidential elections would take place on 28 December, but he was overthrown by the rebel military junta on 7 May, to widespread condemnation by the international community. Fighting had erupted in Bissau on the previous day when rebel troops seized stockpiles of weapons that had been held at the international airport since the disarmament of the rival forces in March.

The rebels, who claimed that their actions had been prompted by Vieira's refusal to allow his presidential guard to be disarmed, surrounded the presidential palace and forced its surrender. Vieira subsequently took refuge at the Portuguese embassy, where on 10 May 1999 he signed an unconditional surrender.

== Post-conflict events ==
The President of the National People's Assembly, Malam Bacai Sanhá, was appointed acting president of the republic until elections were held. The Government of National Unity, including the ministers appointed by Vieira, remained in office. At a meeting of the ruling bodies of the PAIGC that month, Manuel Saturnino da Costa was appointed to replace Vieira as party leader.

At a tripartite meeting conducted in late May by representatives of the government, the military junta and the political parties, agreement was reached that Vieira should stand trial for his involvement in arms trafficking to the Casamance separatists and for political and economic crimes relating to his terms in office. Vieira subsequently agreed to stand trial, but only after receiving medical treatment abroad, after which he pledged to return to Guinea-Bissau.

At a meeting of ECOWAS foreign ministers held in Togo in May 1999, Vieira's overthrow was condemned and demands were made for him to be permitted to leave Guinea-Bissau. It was also decided that ECOMOG forces would be withdrawn from the country. The last ECOMOG troops left in early June.

That month Vieira was permitted to leave Guinea-Bissau to seek medical treatment in France. Sanhá cited humanitarian reasons for allowing Vieira's departure, but stressed that he would return to stand trial. In the same month Sanhá asserted that presidential and legislative elections would take place by 28 November. In July, constitutional amendments were introduced that limited the tenure of presidential office to two terms and abolished the death penalty. It was also stipulated that the country's principal offices of state could only be held by Guinea-Bissau nationals born of Guinea-Bissau parents.

On 28 November 1999, presidential and legislative elections were held with the opposition Social Renewal Party (PRS) winning 38 of 102 seats, making it the largest party represented in the National People's Assembly. The long ruling African Party for the Independence of Guinea and Cape Verde (PAIGC) won 24 seats. The PRS presidential candidate, Kumba Ialá, placed first winning 38.81% of the vote. In a run-off held on 16 January 2000, Ialá easily defeated acting President Malam Bacai Sanhá of the PAIGC, winning 72% of the vote. He was sworn in on 17 February 2000.

== See also ==
- 1980 Guinea-Bissau coup d'état
- 1982 Guinea-Bissau coup attempt
- 1983 Guinea-Bissau coup attempt
- 1984 Guinea-Bissau coup attempt
- 1984 Guinea-Bissau parliamentary election
- 1985 Guinea-Bissau coup attempt
- 1993 Guinea-Bissau coup attempt
- 1998 Guinea-Bissau coup attempt

== Bibliography ==
- Minahan, James (2002). Encyclopedia of the Stateless Nations: Ethnic and National Groups Around the World. Greenwood Publishing Group.
