= 1984 Guinea-Bissau coup attempt =

Failed coup against João Bernardo Vieira

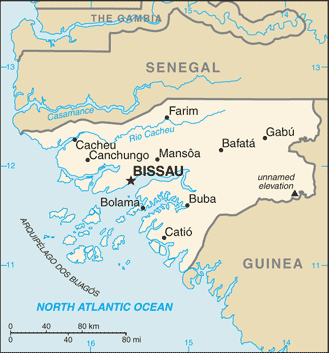
- Map of Guinea-Bissau.
Date	c. 1984
Location	Bissau, Guinea-Bissau 11°51′N 15°34′W
Result	Coup attempt fails: Prime Minister Victor Saúde Maria arrested

Belligerents
Guinea-Bissau; President of Guinea-Bissau; FARP; PAIGC (Factions)	(Guinea-Bissau) Opposition: PAIGC (Factions)

Commanders and leaders
João Bernardo Vieira	Victor Saúde Maria

Casualties and losses
	Maria arrested and later flees in exile
- Nexus of coup in Bissau (marked green), Guinea-Bissau

After a lengthy power struggle in 1984 in Guinea-Bissau over the leadership and organizational direction of its ruling African Party for the Independence of Guinea and Cape Verde, Prime Minister Victor Saúde Maria was arrested by President João Bernardo Vieira on the grounds of attempting to stage a coup.

== Prelude ==
Guinea-Bissau had declared independence from Portugal in 1973 following a long insurgency which was recognized by Portugal in 1974. A coup in 1980 would overthrow the first president of Guinea-Bissau, Luís Cabral, in favor of FARP General João Bernardo Vieira due to Cabral being a mestiço, with black Guineans having grown increasingly disgruntled with perceived mestiço economic and political control. Vieira sought to transform FARP's political wing, PIAGC into a genuine vanguard party in the Marxist-Leninist style, consolidating the party from its highly decentralized and guerilla cell-based structure into a hierarchical party to create a class of mobilized political professionals, which would extend the party's influence outside of the capital and into the more rural parts of the countryside. However, the existing decentralized power structure in PIAGC was heavily favored by the more rural Balanta people who, besides making up a majority of the country's population while Vieira was a Papel, also constituted the vast majority of the PIAGC's political base. Centralizing power around the urban elite in Bissau had been a goal that the PIAGC's political writers had been striving for since at least 1977, however, was always denied by the party's Balanta base.

=== Political crisis ===
In 1981 Vieira held the "Extraordinary Party Congress" wherein he created a 51-member "Central Committee" and 16-member "Political Bureau" to govern the party, all stuffed with his loyalists including 8 of the 9 members of the executive "Revolutionary Council", the ruling junta that Vieira established after his coup. Vieira, the Central Committee, Political Bureau, and the Revolutionary Council now all worked in tandem to replace the older existing government ministers with those loyal to Vieira and FARP claiming that the existing ministers where corrupt or negligent to justify their removal.

There had already been an attempt to stage a pro-Balanta coup in 1982 which was centered around the war hero and then Minister of the Armed Forces Paulo Correia. While there was another coup attempt in 1983 by a broader FARP clique opposed to Vieria cutting army rations during a famine which was talked down by Vieira with a series of concessions.

One of the few ministers that Vieira was unable to purge was Victor Saúde Maria, the foreign minister until 1981, who was named the prime minister in 1982. Maria was able to weave a web of personal support among the various ministries with the two men, Vieira and Maria, taking opposing stances at the Extraordinary Party Congress. At the congress the position of the secretary-general-adjunct, the second in command of PAIGC, was abolished, with Maria as the likely successor.

== Events ==
Vieira sought to hold one-party PAIGC elections first in 1981, then 1982, and then 1983, each time he was foiled by Maria as the unfree elections would've just been a justification for Vieira to consolidate his power and get more of his supporters in office. However, Vieria finally had enough political capital to force through an election in 1984 with Vieira abolishing the position of prime minister shortly after. Maria was then placed under house arrest for attempting to organize a coup. After a year he was eventually released and fled the country.

== Aftermath ==
While Vieira was able to outmaneuver Maria, Correia was building support among the army staff, and launched a second coup attempt shortly after in 1985 which also failed and resulted in his execution.
