= João Bernardo Vieira =

2nd President of Guinea-Bissau (1980–1999, 2005–2009)

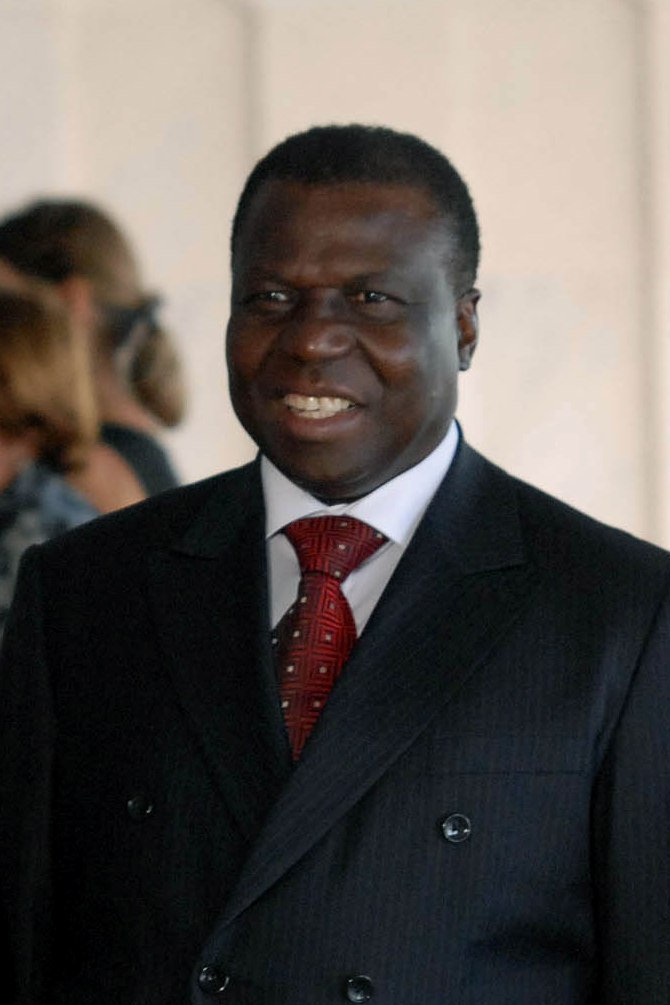
- Vieira in 2007

2nd President of Guinea-Bissau
- In office 1 October 2005 – 2 March 2009
- Prime Minister: Carlos Gomes; Aristides Gomes; Martinho Ndafa Kabi; Carlos Correia; Carlos Gomes
- Preceded by: Henrique Rosa (Acting)
- Succeeded by: Raimundo Pereira (Acting)
- In office 16 May 1984 – 10 May 1999
- Vice President: Paulo Correia; Iafai Camará; Manuel dos Santos 'Manecas'; Vasco Cabral
- Preceded by: Carmen Pereira (Acting)
- Succeeded by: Ansumane Mané
- In office 14 November 1980 – 14 May 1984
- Prime Minister: Victor Saúde Maria
- Vice President: Victor Saúde Maria
- Preceded by: Luís de Almeida Cabral
- Succeeded by: Carmen Pereira (Acting)

3rd Prime Minister of Guinea-Bissau
- In office 28 September 1978 – 14 November 1980
- President: Luís de Almeida Cabral
- Preceded by: Constantino Teixeira
- Succeeded by: Victor Saúde Maria

Vice President of Guinea-Bissau
- In office 13 March 1977 – 28 September 1978
- President: Luis Cabral
- Prime Minister: Francisco Mendes; Constantino Teixeira himself
- Preceded by: Umaru Djaló
- Succeeded by: Umaru Djaló

Personal details
- Born: 27 April 1939 Bissau, Portuguese Guinea
- Died: 2 March 2009 (aged 69) Bissau, Guinea-Bissau
- Cause of death: Assassination
- Resting place: Bissau Municipal Cemetery (2009–2020); Fortaleza de São José da Amura (since November 2020)
- Party: PAIGC (until 1999); Independent
- Spouse: Isabel Romana Vieira
- Relatives: João Bernardo Vieira II (nephew)
- Religion: Catholic Church

Military service
- Allegiance: Guinea-Bissau
- Branch/service: Revolutionary Armed Forces of the People
- Years of service: 1961–1999
- Battles/wars: Guinea-Bissau War of Independence

João Bernardo "Nino" Vieira (Portuguese pronunciation: [ʒuˈɐ̃w bɨɾˈnaɾðu ˈninu viˈɐjɾɐ, ˈʒwɐ̃w -]; 27 April 1939 – 2 March 2009) was a Bissau-Guinean politician and military officer who served as President of Guinea-Bissau from 1980 to 1999, except for a three-day period in May 1984, and from 2005 until his assassination in 2009.

After seizing power from President Luís Cabral in a military coup in 1980, Vieira ruled as part of the Military Council of the Revolution until 1984, when civilian rule was returned. Opposition parties were allowed in 1991, and Vieira won a multiparty presidential election in 1994. He was ousted at the end of the 1998–1999 civil war and went into exile. He made a political comeback in 2005, winning that year's presidential election.

Vieira was shot dead by soldiers on 2 March 2009, apparently in retaliation for a bomb blast at army headquarters that killed Guinea-Bissau's military chief General Batista Tagme Na Waie hours before. The military officially denied these allegations after unidentified Army officials claimed responsibility of Vieira for Na-Waie's death.

Vieira described himself as "God's gift" to Guinea-Bissau during his tenure in office.

== Early life ==
Vieira was born in Bissau, then a city of Portuguese Guinea. Originally trained as an electrician, he joined the African Party for the Independence of Guinea and Cape Verde (PAIGC) of Amílcar Cabral in 1960 and soon became a key player in the territory's guerrilla war against Portuguese colonial rule.

Vieira was a member of the Papel ethnic group, which comprises approximately 5% of Guinea-Bissau's population. By contrast, most of Guinea-Bissau's army officers, with whom Vieira had a tense relationship throughout his career, are members of the Balanta ethnicity, which dominates the country.

== Career ==
=== Early career ===
As the war in Portuguese Guinea intensified, Vieira demonstrated a great deal of skill as a military leader and rapidly rose through its ranks. Vieira was known to his comrades as "Nino" and this remained his nom de guerre for the duration of the struggle. He was the cousin of slain military leader Osvaldo Vieira.

Following regional council elections held in late 1972 in areas under PAIGC control, which led to the formation of a constituent assembly, Vieira was appointed president of the National People's Assembly. The guerrilla war began to turn against the Portuguese as expenditure, damages and loss of human lives remained a burden for Portugal. Following the coup d'état in Portugal in 1974, the new Portuguese revolutionary government which overthrew Lisbon's Estado Novo regime began to negotiate with the PAIGC. As his brother Amílcar had been assassinated in 1973, Luís Cabral became the first president of independent Guinea-Bissau after independence was granted on 10 September 1974.

On 28 September 1978, Vieira was appointed as Prime Minister of Guinea-Bissau.

=== Rise to the Presidency ===
By 1980, economic conditions had deteriorated significantly, which led to general dissatisfaction with the government. On 14 November 1980, Vieira toppled the government of Luís Cabral in a bloodless military coup, which initial reports credited to racial strife between the black population of Guinea-Bissau and the mulatto population of the related Republic of Cape Verde, embodied in the Cabo-Verdian origin of President Cabral. In the wake of the coup, the bordering Republic of Guinea quickly recognised the new government and sought to end a border dispute over an oil-rich region, while the PAIGC in Cape Verde split away and forming a separate party PAICV.

The constitution was suspended and a nine-member military Junta, the Council of the Revolution, chaired by Vieira, was set up with 7 of the 9 members being black FARP officers. This made Vieira increasingly reliant on the army, doing everything in his power to appease them. However, with only so many ministerial posts to give out, large portions of the army became disgruntled that their careers weren't progressing. In 1982 Paulo Correia attempted to stage a coup seeking better conditions for his ethnic group, the Balanta.

In 1983 Guinea-Bissau was rocked by a food shortage, leading to some junior officers within FARP to threaten a coup when Vieira cut the army's rice ration. Vieira arrested the lead plotter Joao de Silva, set up roadblocks throughout Bissau, and invited a Soviet warship to take a prolonged stay in the capital in case it was needed to repel a coup. However, he also granted FARP concessions such as new uniforms, and first take on rice oil and butter over the civilian population. After this coup Vieira changed the constitution in 1984, replacing the Council of the Revolution with the Council of National Security diluting civilian power as much as possible and centralizing the president's role in government. In March 1984 Vieira authorized single party elections, but shortly after engaged in a power struggle with his prime minister; Victor Saúde Maria. Vieira would allege that Maria was plotting yet another coup attempt which forced Maria to flee the country before he was arrested under treason charges.

In June 1986, at least 28 Balanta politicians and generals were executed for the failed coup d'état against Vieira including his Vice-President Paulo Correia and Attorney General Viriato Pa. However, in February 1993, Vieira's regime ended Capital punishment in the country.

Guinea-Bissau, like the rest of Sub-Saharan Africa, moved toward multiparty democracy and a market economy in the early 1990s. Through pressure from groups like the Democratic Front (FD) led by Aristide Menezes, the ban on political parties was lifted in 1991 and elections were held in 1994. In the first round of the presidential election, held on 3 July 1994, Vieira received 46.20% of the vote against seven other candidates. He finished first, but failed to win the required majority, which led to a second round of voting on 7 August. He received 52.02% of the vote against 47.98% for Kumba Yalá, a former philosophy lecturer and candidate of the Social Renewal Party (PRS). International election observers considered both rounds generally free and fair. Vieira was sworn in as the first democratically elected president of Guinea-Bissau on 29 September 1994.

=== Civil war ===
Vieira was re-elected for another four-year term as President of PAIGC in mid-May 1998 at a party congress, with 438 votes in favor, eight opposed, and four abstaining.

Vieira dismissed military chief of staff Ansumane Mané on 6 June 1998, accusing him of smuggling arms to Casamance separatist rebels in Senegal. Mané and his supporters in the military promptly rebelled, and the country descended into a civil war between forces loyal to Vieira and rebels loyal to Mané. According to Birgit Embaló, soldiers in Guinea Bissau were upset at their pay, leading the military to self-finance itself through smuggling. Mané was widely supported by soldiers and war veterans, as well as by some of civil society and members of the political opposition to Vieira's government.

A peace agreement was signed in November 1998, and a transitional government was formed in preparation for new elections in 1999. On 27 November 1998, the National People's Assembly passed a motion demanding Vieira's resignation, with 69 deputies supporting the motion and none opposing it.

A renewed outbreak of fighting occurred in Bissau on 6 May 1999, and Vieira's forces surrendered on 7 May. He sought refuge in the Portuguese embassy and went into exile in Portugal in June. On 12 May, former prime minister Manuel Saturnino da Costa was named acting President of PAIGC, replacing Vieira. Vieira was expelled from PAIGC at a party congress in September 1999 for "treasonable offences, support and incitement to warfare, and practices incompatible with the statutes of the party".

=== Return ===
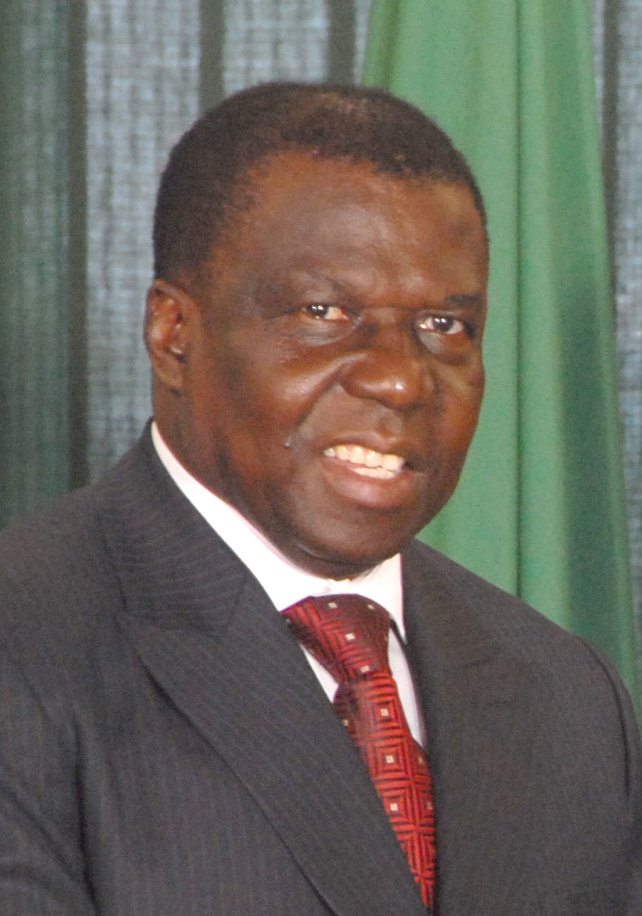
Vieira in December 2005

After President Kumba Yalá was overthrown in September 2003 military coup, Vieira returned to Bissau from Portugal on 7 April 2005. Arriving in the city's main football stadium by helicopter, he was met by over 5,000 cheering supporters. Although Vieira's supporters had collected 30,000 signatures for a petition urging him to run for president, he did not immediately confirm his intention to do so, saying that he was returning "to re-establish [his] civic rights and to register to vote in the coming elections" and that he wanted to contribute to peace and stability. He also said that he had forgiven his enemies and that he hoped others would forgive him for any harm he had caused. On 16 April, it was announced that he intended to stand as a candidate in the June 2005 presidential election. Although many considered Vieira to be ineligible because he had been living in exile and because of legal charges against him pertaining to the 1985 killings of suspected coup plotters, he was cleared to stand in the election by the Supreme Court in May 2005, along with Yalá. The Court unanimously ruled in favor of his candidacy on the grounds that he had already ended his exile by returning in April and that no court records of the murder charges could be found. His old party, the PAIGC, backed former interim president Malam Bacai Sanhá as its candidate.

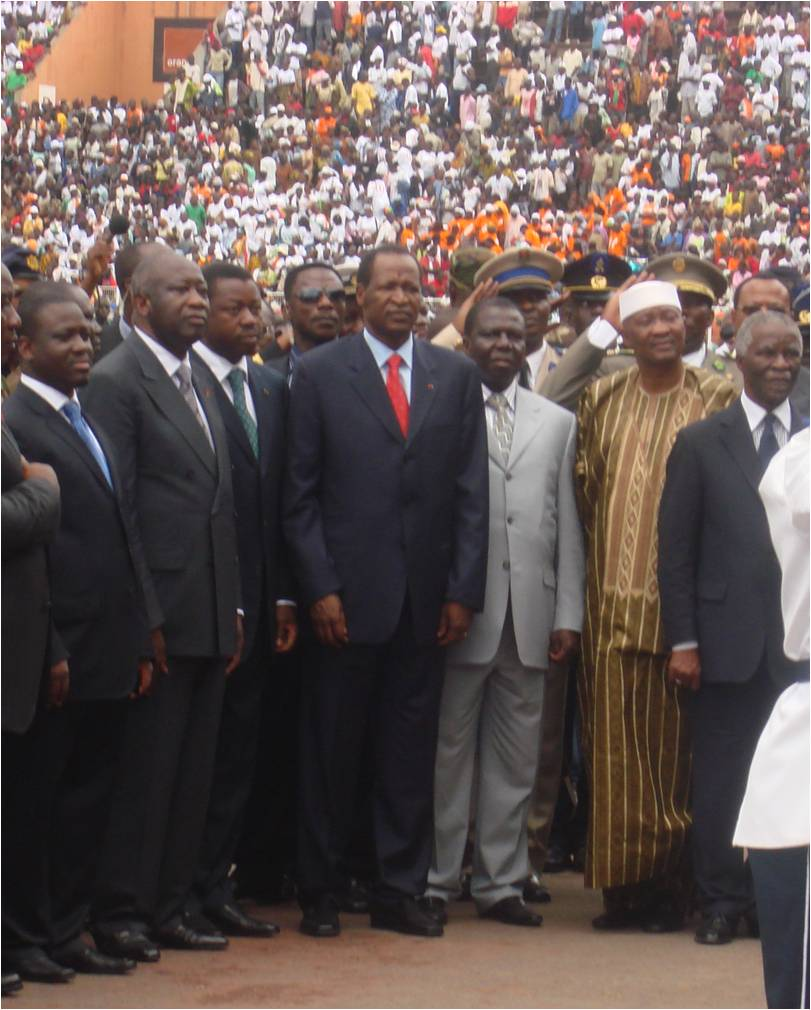
Vieira and others African Heads of State at the Peace Flame Ceremony in Bouaké (Ivory Coast)

According to official results, Vieira placed second in the 19 June election with 28.87% of the vote, behind Malam Bacai Sanhá, and thus participated in the second round run-off. He officially defeated Sanhá in the run-off on 24 July with 52.45% of the vote and was sworn in as president on 1 October.

According to The Economist he probably invited Colombian drug traffickers to finance these elections.

On 28 October 2005, Vieira announced the dissolution of the government headed by his rival Prime Minister Carlos Gomes Junior, citing the need to maintain stability; on 2 November he appointed his political ally Aristides Gomes to the position.

In March 2007, PAIGC formed a three-party alliance with the Party for Social Renewal (PRS) and the United Social Democratic Party (PUSD), and the three parties sought to form a new government. This led to a successful no-confidence vote against Aristides Gomes and his resignation late in the month; on 9 April, the choice of the three parties for the position of prime minister, Martinho Ndafa Kabi, was appointed as prime minister by Vieira. In Kabi's three-party government, Interior Minister Baciro Dabo was considered to be the only close ally of Vieira who was included. Later, after PAIGC withdrew from the three-party alliance to protest Kabi's actions, Vieira dissolved the National People's Assembly and appointed Carlos Correia to replace Kabi as prime minister on 5 August 2008.

On 6 August 2008, navy chief Bubo Na Tchuto was behind a failed coup attempt against Vieira.

== Attacks and death ==
=== November 2008 attack ===
Rebellious soldiers attacked Vieira's home in the early hours of 23 November 2008, shortly after the November 2008 parliamentary election, in which PAIGC won a majority of seats. The soldiers fired artillery at the house and were able to enter it during a three-hour battle with Vieira's guards, but they were repelled before they could reach Vieira, who was unharmed. At least one of Vieira's guards was killed, and others were injured. Vieira held a press conference later in the day, in which he said that the attack had "a single objective – to physically liquidate me", while also asserting that "the situation is under control". In a subsequent radio interview, he told citizens that they can count on the unconditional support of the president and questioned whether the country would continue like this, whether the state could do its job without interference, he accused the Army Chief of Staff, General Batista Tagme Na Waie, of being responsible for the attempted coup d'état and endangering stability, peace and democracy in the country.

=== March 2009 attack ===
General Batista Tagme Na Waie, a key rival of Vieira, was killed by a bomb blast on 1 March 2009. Hours later, Vieira was shot dead by a group of soldiers while fleeing from his private residence in the early hours of 2 March 2009. Diplomats from Angola attempted to take Vieira and his wife to the Angolan Embassy prior to his death, yet Vieira refused to leave while his wife, Isabel Vieira, was taken to safety. Bissau was described as "tense but calm" following his death. According to armed forces spokesman Rear Admiral Zamora Induta, Vieira was involved in the assassination of [Tagme Na Waie, and Induta stated that "President Vieira was killed by the army as he tried to flee his house which was being attacked by a group of soldiers close to the Chief of Staff Tagme Na Waie early this morning". The army denied that Vieira's killing marked a coup d'état and said that the constitutional order would be followed, meaning that the president of the National People's Assembly, Raimundo Pereira, would succeed Vieira.

A doctor who was involved in Vieira's autopsy was quoted by Agence France-Presse as saying that Vieira was "savagely beaten before being finished off with several bullets".

The council of ministers created a commission of inquiry in an emergency meeting to investigate the two assassinations.

A state funeral for Vieira, attended by thousands of people, was held in Bissau on 10 March 2009. No foreign leaders were present. At the funeral service held at the National People's Assembly, his daughter Elisa urged an end to the violence. The eulogy for Vieira stressed his importance in the war for independence and his adoption of multiparty politics and liberal economic reforms in the early 1990s.

==== International reaction ====
Mohamed Ibn Chambas, head of the Economic Community of West African States (ECOWAS), declared "'The death of a president', of a chief of staff, is very grave news," adding "It's not only the assassination of a president or a chief of staff, it's the assassination of democracy".

The former secretary general of the UN Ban Ki-moon condemned the double murder and insisted on an investigation into the deaths while offering condolences to the nation.

The African Union called the killing a criminal act and the European Union and United States also condemned Vieira's murder.

Socialist International, of which Vieira's party is a member, stated "The International has followed with great concern the recent political difficulties in Guinea-Bissau and reiterates its firm view that there never can be any justification for the use of force to resolve political disputes and that political assassination is a completely heinous and criminal act."Library

== Body transferred ==
In November 2020, at the initiative of President Umaro Sissoco Embaló, Vieira's body was reinterred in the bow declaring that the late president is the national heritage of Guinea-Bissau. The corpse was again buried in the Fortaleza de São José da Amura along with other heads of state such as Malam Bacai Sanhá and Kumba Ialá, in the fortress where the General Staff of the Revolutionary Armed Forces of the People work.

== Career list ==
- Political Commissioner and Military Chief for the Catió Region (1961)
- Military Commander of the Southern Front (1964)
- Member of the PAIGC Political Bureau (1964–1965)
- Vice-President of the PAIGC War Council (1965–1967)
- Southern Front Political Bureau Delegate (1967–1970)
- Member of the PAIGC War Council Executive Committee (1970–1971)
- Member of the PAIGC Permanent Secretariat (1973–????)
- Named PAIGC Deputy Secretary-General in 1973
- President of the People's National Assembly (1973–1978)
- Vice President of Guinea-Bissau (March 1977 – 28 September 1978)
- Prime Minister of Guinea-Bissau (28 September 1978 – 14 November 1980)
- Chairman of the Council of the Revolution (14 November 1980 – 14 May 1984)
- Chairman of the Council of State (16 May 1984 – 29 September 1994)
- President of Guinea-Bissau (29 September 1994 – 7 May 1999)
- President of Guinea-Bissau (1 October 2005 – 2 March 2009)

== See also ==
- List of heads of state and government who were assassinated or executed
- List of presidents of Guinea-Bissau

Political offices
Preceded by Umaru Djaló	Vice President of Guinea-Bissau; 1977–1978	Succeeded by Umaru Djaló
Preceded by Constantino Teixeira	Prime Minister of Guinea-Bissau; 1978–1980	Succeeded by Victor Saúde Maria
Preceded by Luís Cabral	President of Guinea-Bissau; 1980–1984	Succeeded by Carmen Pereira; Acting
Preceded by Carmen Pereira; Acting	President of Guinea-Bissau; 1984–1999	Succeeded by Ansumane Mané
Preceded by Henrique Rosa; Acting	President of Guinea-Bissau; 2005–2009	Succeeded by Raimundo Pereira; Acting
