= African Youth Amílcar Cabral =

Youth organisation of the African Party for the Independence of Guinea and Cape Verde

African Youth Amílcar Cabral Juventude Africana Amílcar Cabral
- Founded: 12 September 1974 in Boe, Guinea-Bissau
- Mother party: African Party for the Independence of Guinea and Cape Verde
- International affiliation: World Federation of Democratic Youth, WFDY (passive); International Union of Socialist Youth, IUSY (observer)

African Youth Amílcar Cabral (Portuguese: Juventude Africana Amílcar Cabral, JAAC) is the youth wing of PAIGC in Guinea-Bissau. JAAC was founded on September 12, 1974, in Boe.

After the separation of PAICV from PAIGC, the Cape Verdean section of JAAC became a separate organization, also called JAAC. Today that organization has been renamed Youth of PAICV (Juventude do PAICV).

JAAC is a member of World Federation of Democratic Youth, although it is no longer active in that organization. It used to be a member of the International Union of Students, but the membership is currently frozen. JAAC has obtained observer status in the International Union of Socialist Youth.
