= 1980 Guinea-Bissau coup d'état =

Coup that brought João Bernardo Vieira to power

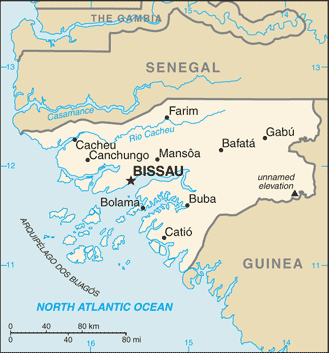
- Map of Guinea-Bissau.
Date	14 November 1980
Location	Bissau, Guinea-Bissau 11°51′N 15°34′W
Result	Coup attempt succeeds with minimum disruption.: President Luís Cabral removed from office.; Prime Minister General João Bernardo Vieira took control of the country.; Failed anti-Vieira coups in 1982, 1983, 1984, 1985, and 1993; Partially successful anti-Vieira coup in 1998 starts the Guinea-Bissau civil war

Belligerents
Guinea-Bissau; President of Guinea-Bissau; PAIGC (factions)	(Guinea-Bissau) "Revolutionary Council"; FARP; PAIGC (factions)

Commanders and leaders
Luís Cabral	João Bernardo Vieira

Casualties and losses
- No casualties reported.
- Nexus of coup in Bissau (marked green), Guinea-Bissau

The 1980 Guinea-Bissau coup d'état was a bloodless military coup that took place in Guinea-Bissau on 14 November 1980, led by Prime Minister General João Bernardo Vieira. It led to the deposition of President Luís Cabral (half-brother of anti-colonial leader Amílcar Cabral), who held the office since 1973, while the country's War of Independence was still ongoing.

== Aftermath ==
General Vieira announced the creation of the Revolutionary Council, which would exercise all executive and legislative powers in the country. Eventually, a power struggle developed between Vieira and Victor Saúde Maria, Prime Minister and Vice President of the Revolutionary Council, the only civilian member of the body, with the latter being forced into exile in Portugal in March 1984. Two months later a new Constitution was promulgated, proclaiming Vieira as President and returning the country to civilian rule.

Vieira himself was deposed in the 1998–99 Civil War and exiled to Portugal in June 1999, but returned to the country in 2005 and was again elected to the presidency, and held the office until his assassination by a group of soldiers on 2 March 2009.

== Effects on relations with Cape Verde ==
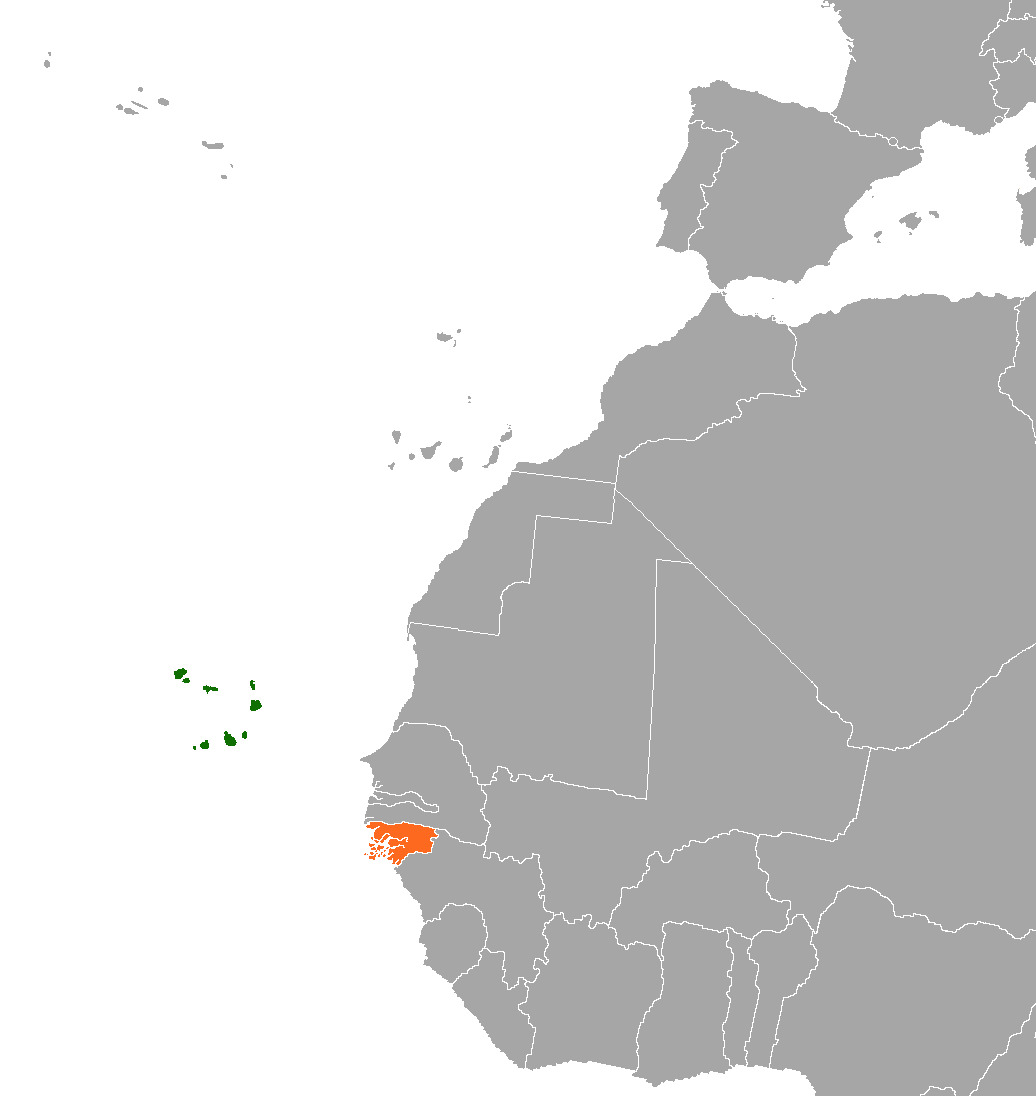
Map indicating locations of Guinea Bissau (orange) and Cape Verde (green).

The coup resulted in the abandonment of the proposed unification of Guinea-Bissau with Cape Verde, a fellow Lusophone West African country. Prior to the coup, the unification was written into the two countries' constitutions, and the PAIGC party (the ruling sole legal party in both countries) viewed them as "sister republics" with "two bodies with only one heart", and the countries had nearly identical flags and shared a national anthem.

However, the elites in Cape Verde opposed unification, and eventually Vieira toppled the government of President Cabral (himself of the Cape Verdean origin) in Guinea-Bissau in a bloodless coup, which initial reports credited to racial strife between the black population of Guinea-Bissau and the "foreign" mulatto (mestiço) population of Cape Verde, which Cabral embodied.

The coup led to Cape Verde separating on 20 January 1981. The Cape Verdean branch of the PAIGC party broke away and formed the new PAICV party under the leadership of Aristides Pereira, President of Cape Verde and former Secretary-General of the PAIGC.

Flag of Guinea-Bissau.

Flag of Cape Verde, in use until 1992.

== See also ==
- 1982 Guinea-Bissau coup attempt
- 1983 Guinea-Bissau coup attempt
- 1984 Guinea-Bissau coup attempt
- 1985 Guinea-Bissau coup attempt
- 1993 Guinea-Bissau coup attempt
- 1998 Guinea-Bissau coup attempt
- Guinea-Bissau civil war
