= Luís Cabral =

President of Guinea-Bissau from 1974 to 1980

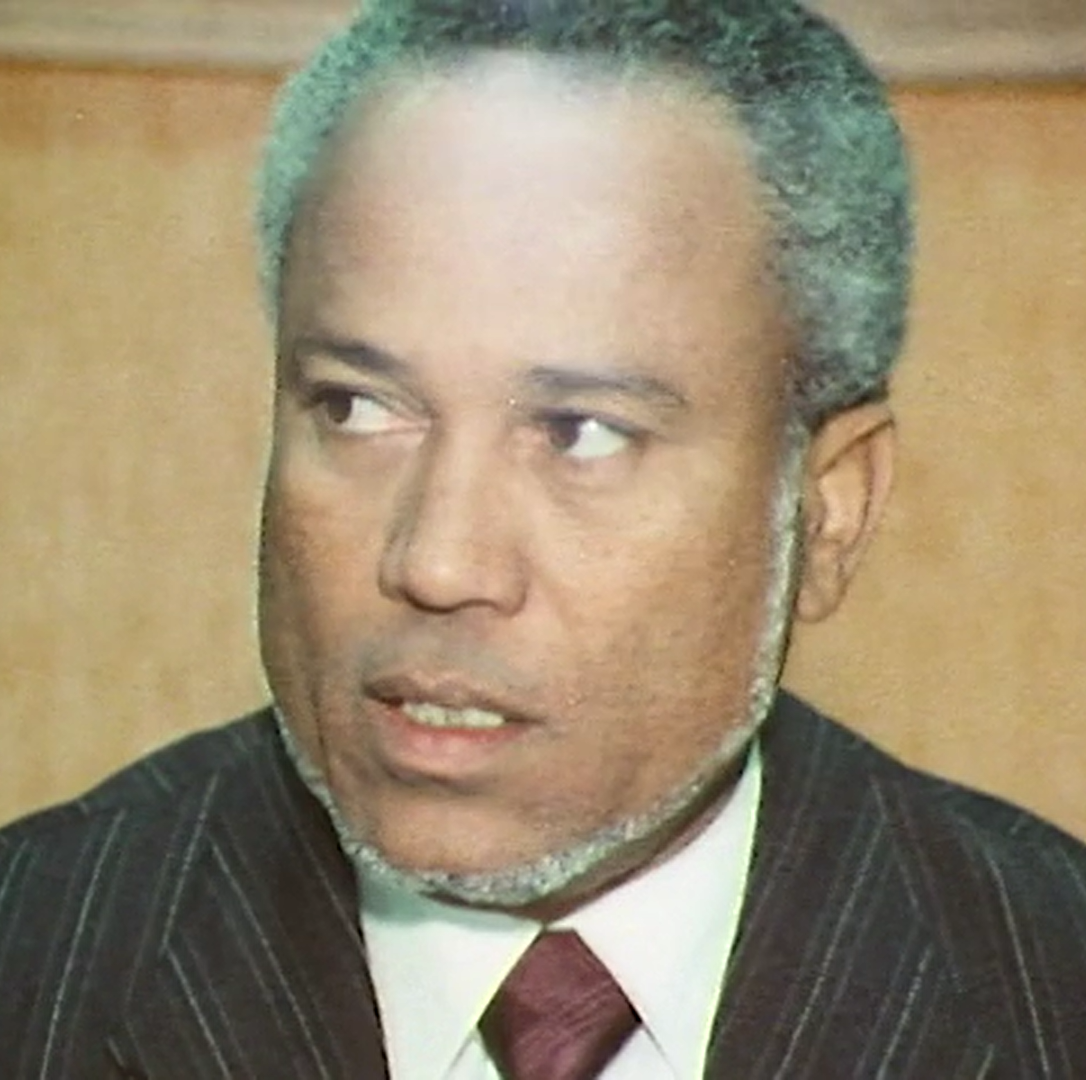
- Luís Cabral in 1979

1st President of Guinea-Bissau
- In office 24 September 1973 – 14 November 1980
- Prime Minister: Francisco Mendes
- Vice President: Umaru Djaló; João Bernardo Vieira
- Preceded by: Office established
- Succeeded by: João Bernardo Vieira

Personal details
- Born: Luís Severino de Almeida Cabral; 11 April 1931 Bissau, Portuguese Guinea
- Died: 30 May 2009 (aged 78) Torres Vedras, Portugal
- Cause of death: Cardiac arrest
- Resting place: Cemitério do Alto de São João
- Party: African Party for the Independence of Guinea and Cape Verde
- Spouse: Lucete Cabral

Luís Severino de Almeida Cabral (11 April 1931 – 30 May 2009) was a Bissau-Guinean politician who was the first President of Guinea-Bissau. He served from 1974 to 1980, when a military coup d'état led by João Bernardo Vieira deposed him. Luís Cabral was a half-brother of Amílcar Cabral, with whom he co-founded the African Party for the Independence of Guinea and Cape Verde (PAIGC) in 1956.

== Early life ==
Luís Cabral was born in the city of Bissau, Portuguese Guinea, on April 11, 1931, to mestiço (mixed-race) parents originally from Cape Verde. He completed his primary school studies in the Cape Verde archipelago, which was also a Portuguese territory at that time. Later he received training in accountancy. He was also educated in Bissau and joined a Portuguese business, Companhia União Fabril.

== Pro-independence guerrilla and Presidency ==
In 1956 Cabral was one of the six founders of the African Party for the Independence of Guinea and Cape Verde (PAIGC). In the early 1960s, PAIGC launched an anti-colonial guerrilla war against the Portuguese authorities. He helped organize a dock strike that was brutally suppressed by the Portuguese authorities. and resulted in a loss of more than 50 lives. This led to the PAIGC abandoning non-violence, which came as a shock to Cabral. Luís Cabral's rise to leadership began in 1973, after the assassination in Conakry, Guinea, of his half-brother Amílcar Cabral, the noted Pan-African intellectual and founder of the PAIGC. Leadership of the party then engaged in fighting for independence from Portuguese rule for both Guinea-Bissau (then known as Portuguese Guinea) and for Cape Verde, fell to Aristides Pereira, who later became the president of Cape Verde. The Guinea-Bissau branch of the party, however, followed Luís Cabral.

Following the Carnation Revolution in April 1974 in Lisbon, the new left-wing revolutionary government of Portugal granted independence to Portuguese Guinea, as Guinea-Bissau, on September 10 that same year. The PAIGC had unilaterally proclaimed the country's independence one year before in the village of Madina do Boé, and this event had been recognized by many socialist and non-aligned member states of the United Nations. Luís Cabral became President of Guinea-Bissau. A program of national reconstruction and development, of socialist inspiration (with the support of USSR, China, but also Nordic countries), began. Access to education and health has improved significantly in a few years. But some suspicion and instability was present in the party since Amílcar Cabral's death and the independence. Relations with Portugal after independence were relatively good. The Guinean president visited Portugal in 1978 and President Ramalho Eanes visited the former colony the next year, referring to the Luso-Guinean relationship as a model for those Portugal sought to establish with Angola and Mozambique.

Some sections of the party accused Luís Cabral and the other members with Cape Verdean origins of dominating the party. Alleging this, Cabral's Prime Minister and former armed forces commander João Bernardo Vieira organized his overthrow on November 14, 1980, in a military coup. Luís Cabral was then arrested and detained for 13 months.

== Exile ==
After the 1980 Guinea-Bissau coup d'état, he was sent into exile, first in Cuba, which offered to receive him, then (in 1984), in Portugal, where the Portuguese Government received him and gave him measure to live with his family, until his death in 2009.

Shortly after being appointed Prime Minister following the Guinea-Bissau Civil War, Francisco Fadul called for Cabral's return from exile in December 1998. Cabral said in response, in the Portuguese newspaper 24 Horas, that he would be willing to return, but not while Vieira remained in power; Vieira had said that he could not guarantee Cabral's safety, and Cabral said that as a result, he feared for his life should he return while Vieira remained president. On October 22, 1999, following Vieira's ouster, coup leader Ansumane Mane invited Cabral to return, giving him a passport marking him as "President of the Guinea Bissau Council of State" while in Lisbon. Cabral was in Bissau in mid-November 1999, and said on the occasion that he did not want to become active in politics again or to rejoin PAIGC.

== Death ==
Cabral died aged 78 on May 30, 2009, in Torres Vedras, Portugal. His death followed a long bout of illness.

The National Assembly of Guinea-Bissau stated: "It is with shock and sadness that the government and people of Guinea-Bissau have learnt of the loss of one of their most illustrious sons, Luis Cabral". It held an emergency session at which it organised a three-day period of national mourning.

== Controversies ==
As the President of Guinea-Bissau, his authoritarian single-party regime was severely repressive and the country was hit by severe food shortages. Luís Cabral was also accused of being responsible for the execution of a large number of black Guinea-Bissauan soldiers who had fought alongside the Portuguese Army against the PAIGC guerrillas during the Portuguese Colonial War, a claim that Cabral always denied.

== See also ==
- History of Guinea-Bissau

Political offices
New title	President of Guinea-Bissau; 1974–1980	Succeeded by João Bernardo Vieira
