= Victor Saúde Maria =

Bissau-Guinean politician

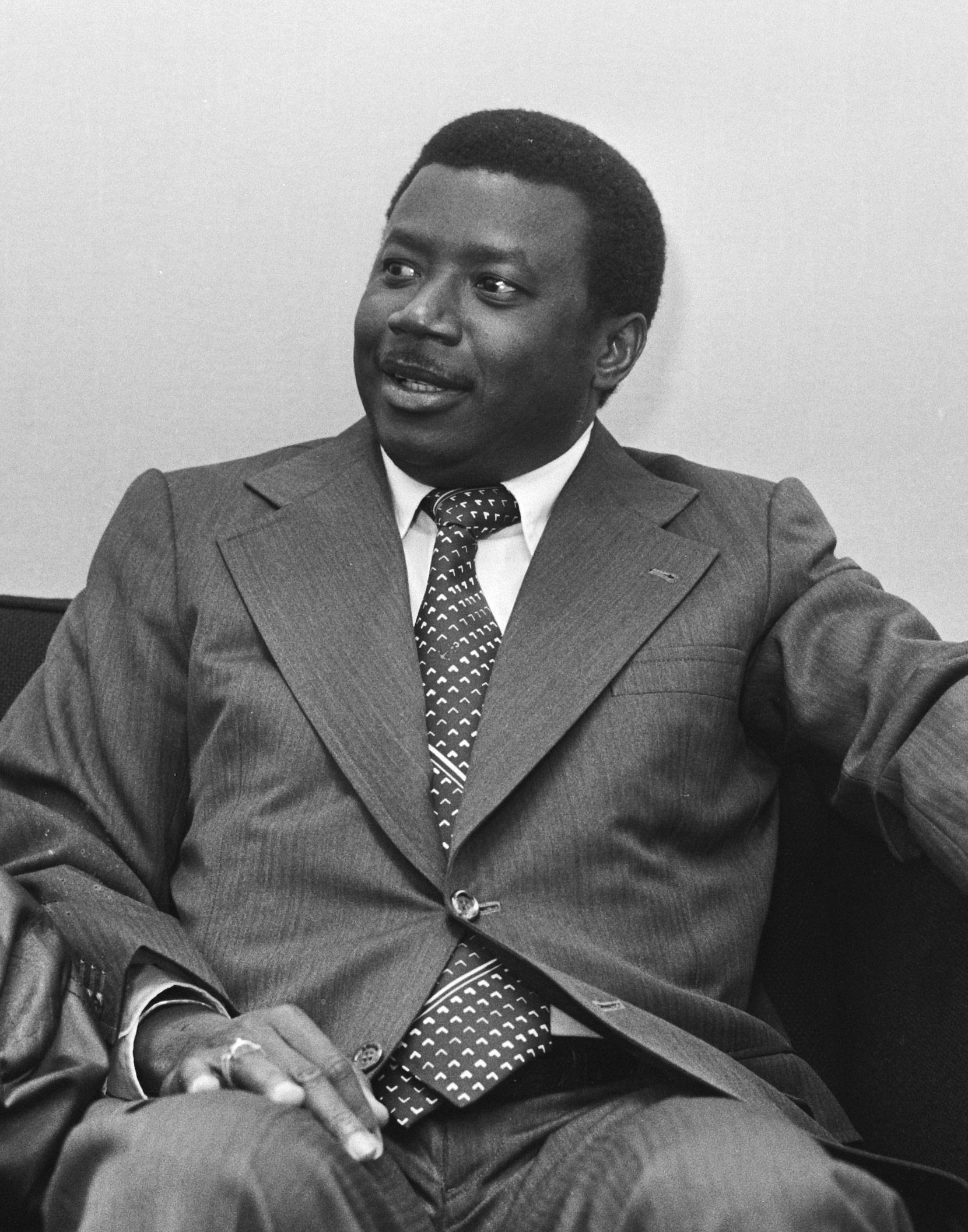
- Victor Saúde Maria in 1980

4th Prime Minister of Guinea-Bissau
- In office 14 May 1982 – 10 March 1984
- President: João Bernardo Vieira
- Preceded by: João Bernardo Vieira
- Succeeded by: Carlos Correia (1991)

Vice President of Guinea-Bissau
- In office 14 November 1980 – 10 March 1984
- President: João Bernardo Vieira
- Prime Minister: Vacant himself
- Preceded by: João Bernardo Vieira
- Succeeded by: First Vice President and Second Vice President established

Personal details
- Born: 5 May 1938 Bambadinca, Portuguese Guinea
- Died: 25 October 1999 (aged 61) Guinea-Bissau
- Party: PAIGC; United Social Democratic Party

Victor Saúde Maria (5 May 1938 in Bambadinca – 25 October 1999) was a Bissau-Guinean politician. Saúde Maria was the country's first Foreign Minister (1974–1982) and then went on to be Prime Minister from 14 May 1982 until 10 March 1984, when he fled to Portugal after a power struggle with President João Bernardo Vieira fearing summary execution after hearing President Vieira accuse him of "High Treason".

Maria returned from exile in late 1990 and set up the United Social Democratic Party (PUSD) in 1992. He ran for President in 1994, placing seventh and receiving 2.07% of the vote. He led the PUSD until his assassination in 1999.

Preceded by None	Foreign Minister of Guinea-Bissau; 1974–1982	Succeeded by Samba Lamine Mané
