= Balanta people =

Ethnic group of Guinea-Bissau, Guinea, Senegal, and The Gambia

Balanta
Total population
- 323,948

Regions with significant populations
- Guinea-Bissau; Senegal; The Gambia

Languages
- Balanta, Kriol

Religion
- Traditional African religion, Roman Catholicism, Islam

The Balanta (Guinea-Bissau Creole and Portuguese: balanta; French: balante; lit. “those who resist” in Mandinka) are an ethnic group found in Guinea-Bissau, Guinea, Senegal, Cape Verde and The Gambia. They are the second largest ethnic group of Guinea-Bissau, representing around a quarter of the population. Despite their numbers, they have remained outside the colonial and postcolonial state because of their social organisation. The Balanta can be divided into six dialects: Nyacra, Ganja (Mane), Naga, Patch, Sofar and Kentohe. The largest of which are the Balanta Kentohe.

The Balantas mainly get their last names from the name that is given to a clan, for example. "Na Sanyang", meaning, "house of Sanyang" – which points to a clan. Normally, in a Balanta society, houses are built based on clans.

Normally, the Balantas name their children depending on the circumstances, situations and conditions they are in. For example, a child could be named as "Yabna", which means "rest"; "Alámy" which means "king", and so on. The Balanta could also name a child to express sarcasms as a means of responding to their rivals. For example,"Nsimban", which means, "I have heard them"; "Boulonyi", meaning "I am hated", etc.

Archaeologists believe that the people who became the Balanta migrated to present-day Guinea-Bissau in small groups between the 10th and 14th centuries CE. During the 19th century, they spread throughout the area that is now Guinea-Bissau and southern Senegal in order to resist the expansion of the Kaabu kingdom. Today, the Balanta are found in the modern-day countries of Senegal, Cape Verde and Gambia but mostly reside in the southern and central regions of Guinea-Bissau.

== Genetics and origin ==
"The Balanta claim that the region between the Rios Mansôa and Geba—an area they call Nhacra, which is part of the broader region of Oio—is their homeland. The Balanta say that they migrated there "in times long past" from somewhere in the east."

According to their oral tradition, the Balanta people originated in Sudan. Linguist Fernando Rogado Quintino found some language similarities between the Balanta and Sudanese peoples, which hinted at a Sudanese origin. Dr. Franz Stuhlmann also theorized that the Balanta descended from a Bantu people who inhabited the Nile and separated during the Pleistocene period. Despite this early research, a Sudanese origin of the Balanta was still heavily criticized in some academic circles. It wasn't until recently that genetic testing and haplogroup assigning suggested that the Sudan origin theory had merit. A collection of blood samples from Balanta people in Guinea-Bissau were studied. Unexpectedly, a small number of the samples, about 3-5%, carried the haplogroups M1, normally observed in North Africa, East Africa and the Middle East. They also found that Balanta haplotype GB44 only matched Sudanese sequences and haplotype GB59 only matched with Moroccan sequences. Scientists currently believe that these findings support the suggestion of a Sudanese origin for the Balanta people through the migration of a Kushitic group to western Africa about 2,000 years ago followed by the assimilation within the local population acquiring their language.

== History ==
Archaeologists believe that the Balanta migrated to present-day Guinea-Bissau in small groups between the 10th and 14th centuries. During the 19th century, they spread throughout Guinea-Bissau and southern Senegal to escape the expansion of Kaabu. Oral tradition among the Balanta themselves says they migrated westward from the region of present-day Egypt, Sudan, and Ethiopia to escape conflict there. Today, the Balanta settled primarily south of the Geba River and in central Guinea-Bissau.

The Balanta were both victims and victimisers of the Atlantic Slave Trade, as a result of conflicts with their surrounding ethnic groups.

On January 9, 1859, a treaty was signed between France and the chiefs of Cougnaro and Souna for the transfer to France of the Balanta coast.

Young Balantas have made a considerable contribution to the struggle for independence in Guinea-Bissau. However, there is a certain level of resentment, due to the impression (real or unfounded) of not having been sufficiently taken into account in decision-making bodies since independence in 1974.

== Culture ==
The Balanta follow a matrilineal system, other sources state patrilineal, though it is believe they follow a bilineal system (double descent) just like their Serer neighbours in the Senegambia region. They are farmers and fishermen, and also engage in small-scale trade and craft-making.

=== Names and surnames ===
The Balantas mainly get their last names from the name that is given to a clan, for example. "Na Sanyang", meaning, "house of Sanyang" – which points to a clan. Normally, in a Balanta society, houses are built based on clans.

Normally, the Balantas name their children depending on the circumstances, situations and conditions they are in. For example, a child could be named as "Yabna", which means "rest"; "Alámy" which means "king", and so on. The Balanta could also name a child to express sarcasms as a means of responding to their rivals. For example,"Nsimban", which means, "I have heard them"; "Boulonyi", meaning "I am hated", etc.

Documentationcreatepurge

=== Decision making in society (Council of Elders) ===
All important decisions amongst the Balanta are taken by a Council of Elders. To become a member of the Council of Elders, the person has to be initiated during the Fanado ceremony. In general, egalitarianism prevails amongst the Balanta. Consequently, the Portuguese colonialists found it difficult to govern them. In the late nineteenth and early twentieth centuries, Portugal mounted pacification campaigns against the resistant Balanta and subjected them to appointed Fulbe chiefs. Because of the Portuguese repression, the Balanta enlisted as soldiers in great numbers and were principal supporters of the PAIGC in the nationalist struggle for liberation during the 1960s and 1970s. Many Balanta resented their exclusion from the government; their prominence in the military spurred a series of Balanta-led coup attempts in the 1980s.

=== Religion ===
The Balanta practice indigenous, spiritual customs and rites (Traditional African religion). In the Balanta society, God is believed to be far away, and communication with the Almighty is established through their spiritual practices and traditions. Of the world religions, Islam and Catholic Christianity are practiced; Islam is more prevalent than Christianity and is often practiced alongside the Balanta's unique spirit worship. Djon Cago is worshipped in Balanta spirituality. Adherers to Balanta spirituality aims to reach what they worship through necromancy and sacrifice.

=== Music ===
The Balanta play a gourd lute instrument called a kusunde. On the kusunde instrument, the short string is at the bottom rather than at the top, the top string was of middle length and the middle string is the longest although it was capoed by the middle length string and its open sounding length is therefore the same as that string. The tones produced by the instrument are in all: top string open F#, top string stopped G#, middle string open C#, middle string stopped D#, bottom drone string A#/B. The Balanta kusunde is similar to the Jola akonting. The Balanta also play the balafon, which is composed of 24 layers instead of 12 or 14 found in the Mandingue community.

=== Marriage ===
In People Like Me 2002: Face to Face!, the Sunugal Ballet presented the Balanta wedding dance from the village of Mini-Ndame. In this village, when the prince comes of age to marry, the kingdom has a big party, to which every family brings their daughters. The young women compete with their beauty and their virtuosic dancing for the hand of the prince. The prince then chooses his bride, and a celebration ensues. To prove his courage to his future wife, a Balanta man must steal a cow. The masks that are used in this dance include a large spirit mask laden with cowry shells, an old woman mask, a young girl mask, and a young man mask. As symbols of family and spiritual connection, the masks play an important role when the community comes together to celebrate with music and dance.

=== Farming ===
The Balanta are fishermen, herders, and cultivators. They grow millet, rice, peanuts, cashews, and fruit for a cash crop. Their specialty is the culture of cashew which they derive from the apple wine cashew called Cadjou. The export to India of cashew nuts also provides an important economic force in the Balanta villages. Raising cattle is also a traditional activity predominant as the sacrifice of the cattle is import in all stages of life (initiation, marriage, death, etc.) The back of Guinea-Bissau's 50-peso note (No. 1) shows two farmers wielding an agricultural tool that is called a kebinde in the Balanta language (also called an arade in Guinean Creole). These tools are used by the Balanta, Jola and Papel peoples to prepare the soil for planting crops – usually rice. Use of the kebinde is an art that has been perfected over many years by the Balanta people who deservedly hold a reputation as expert farmers. Along with intricate irrigation systems that mix salt and fresh water, they manage to maintain the nutrients in the soil and achieve excellent yields. After the harvest, the Balanta people have a celebration called the Kussundé, where non-initiated men compete in dances.

=== Rites of passage ===
The Balanta have initiation rites at various states of the individual's life. Each phase of life, from childhood to adulthood, is regulated by an initiation that marks the entrance into a new social category. From early childhood up to age 15, the child belongs to the category of Nwatch. Around age 18 to 20, the individual enters the Fuur and then enters the Nghaye around age 25. Around age 30, according to the rites of Kgness a man will be authorized to take a woman.

After the young Balanta man has become a landowner and taken on family responsibilities, he can then be chosen by his maternal uncle to participate in the Fanado initiation. Once chosen for the Fanado, a Balanta man cannot refuse the family's wishes. The Fanado initiation ceremony takes place once every four years. The Fanado is a two-month process in the “sacred woods” which is the ultimate phase of initiation rites and social hierarchy. Initiation during the Fanado ritual opens the doors of maturity and wisdom in the Balanta community. Depicted on the back of the 50-peso note (No. 1) is a man in the costume worn by young Balanta men during the “Fanado” or male circumcision ceremony. Part of the costume is a tortoise shell that is hollowed out and worn on the back.

The first day of the Fanado ceremony is a general festival for the entire village during which people eat, drink and dance. The initiates are presented to the village by their maternal uncles and greeted by the village. After the presentation and greeting, the initiates are brought in the middle of a tropical forest to a place completely secret called the “sacred woods.” In the “sacred woods” the initiates are circumcised by the “master”, a sort of magical figure-pedagogical. After the first few days of circumcision, the initiates must build a kind of hut that will serve as their home-base for the next two months. During these two months, the initiates only have contact with their uncles and the “master”. The initiates undergo test of endurance and learn to be men. What is imparted to the initiates during the Fanado not only concerns their entire culture, but also how to behave with others, how to manage the family, and how to live as adults and men therefore wise. The tests and trials are hard to the point where some people face physical suffering, mutilation, and/or do not survive.

Once completed, the initiate is a man, capable of taking care of other people in the tribe. After two months in the “woods,” the initiate (if survived) is ready to return to his family as a new man. Nothing remains of the place where the rite was held, everything is burnt and jealously guarded in secret by those who took part. Mothers learn of the fate of their children only on arrival to the village of the “new” men. The initiates that do survive emerge from the “sacred woods” to songs of their bravery by family and friends. The initiate then wears a bright red hat to show that he has become Lante Ndang (brave and wise), and the following day he will be allowed to serve on the council of elders who manages village life. The ex-president of Guinea-Bissau Kumba Yalla is a member of the Balanta people and was often seen wearing a red hat as a sign that he had completed the Fanado initiation.

== Notable people ==
- Kumba Ialá, President of Guinea-Bissau from 2000 to 2003
- Moía Mané, Bissau-Guinean footballer
- Sori Mané, Bissau-Guinean footballer
- Biague Na Ntan, Bissau-Guinean General
- Franculino Djú, Bissau-Guinean footballer
- Renato Nhaga, Bissau-Guinean footballer
- Nuno Gomes Nabiam, Prime Minister of Guinea-Bissau from 2020 to 2023
- Fernando Dias, Bissau-Guinean politician and lawyer
