= Liberated Zones (Guinea-Bissau) =

Territory under the control of the PAIGC

- 1963–1974
- Flag Coat of arms

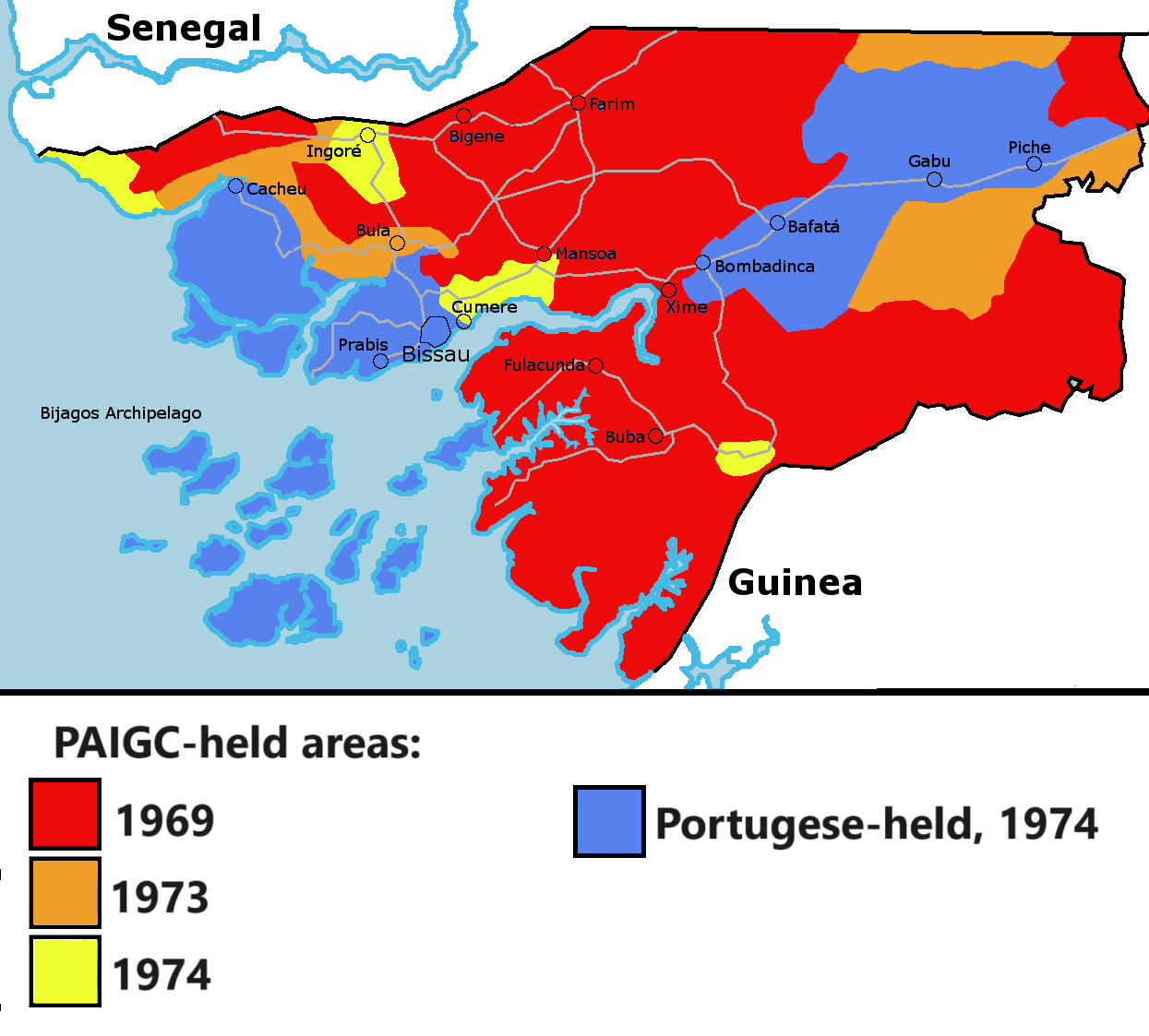
- Status: Rival government and quasi-state (1963–1973) Territory of the Republic of Guinea-Bissau, which were not under Portuguese control (1973–1974)
- Government: Marxist civil administration
- De facto leader (as Secretary General of the PAIGC)
  - 1963–1973: Amílcar Cabral
  - 1973: Triumvirate (Note: Members were Luís Cabral, Aristides Pereira and Dr. Vitor Monteiro)
- Chairman of the Council of State of Guinea-Bissau
  - 1973–1974: Luís Cabral (Note: In exile in Conakry, Guinea.)
- Vice Chairman of the Council of State of Guinea-Bissau and Prime Minister of Guinea-Bissau
  - 1973–1974: Umaru Djaló (vp) and Francisco Mendes (pm)
- Establishment: Guinea-Bissau War of Independence (Portuguese Colonial War)
- History
  - Established: Early (c. 23 January) 1963
  - Establishment of the Republic of Guinea-Bissau: 24 September 1973
  - Recognition of the independence of the Republic of Guinea-Bissau: 10 September 1974
Preceded by	Succeeded by
Portuguese Guinea	Guinea-Bissau

The Liberated Zones were a self-proclaimed rival government and quasi-state controlled by the African Party for the Independence of Guinea and Cape Verde (PAIGC), consisting of territories under its control during the Guinea-Bissau War of Independence between 1963 and 1974.

== Background ==
In 1960, the PAIGC started to organize their guerrilla war. In July 1961, the PAIGC started there guerrilla war. In March 1962 with an abortive attack by PAIGC guerrillas on Praia, the guerrilla warfare was largely concentrated to the mainland Guinea, however, as logistical reasons prevented an armed struggle on the Cape Verde islands. On the Cape Verde islands, PAIGC worked in a clandestine manner. After being nearly crippled militarily, Amílcar Cabral ordered that sabotage be the PAIGC's main weapon until military strength could be regained.

=== Pre-independence ===
The party was established in Bissau on 19 September 1956 as the African Party of Independence (Partido Africano da Independência), and was based on the Movement for the National Independence of Portuguese Guinea (Movimento para Independência Nacional da Guiné Portuguesa) founded in 1954 by Henri Labéry and Amílcar Cabral. The party had six founding members; Cabral, his brother Luís, Aristides Pereira, Fernando Fortes, Júlio Almeida and Elisée Turpin. Rafael Paula Barbosa became its first president, whilst Amílcar Cabral was appointed secretary-general.

The Pidjiguiti massacre in 1959 saw Portuguese soldiers open fire on protesting dockworkers, killing 50. The massacre caused a large segment of the population to swing towards the PAIGC's push for independence, although the Portuguese authorities still considered the movement to be irrelevant and took no serious action in trying to suppress it. However, the massacre convinced the PAIGC leadership to resort to armed struggle against the Portuguese, and in September 1959 the party established a new headquarters in Conakry in neighbouring Guinea. In 1961, the PAIGC combined with the Mozambican FRELIMO and Angolan MPLA to establish the Conference of Nationalist Organizations of the Portuguese Colonies (CONCP), a common party to coordinate the struggles for independence of Portuguese colonies across Africa. The three groups were often represented at international events by the CONCP.

Armed struggle against the Portuguese began in March 1962 with an abortive attack by PAIGC guerrillas on Praia. Guerrilla warfare was largely concentrated on mainland Guinea; however, logistical reasons prevented an armed struggle on the Cape Verde islands. On the Cape Verde islands, PAIGC worked in a clandestine manner. After being nearly crippled militarily, Amílcar Cabral ordered that sabotage be the PAIGC's main weapon until military strength could be regained. On 23 January 1963 the PAIGC started the Guinea-Bissau War of Independence by attacking a Portuguese garrison in Tite. Frequent attacks in the north also took place. In that same month, attacks on police stations in Fulacunda and Buba were carried out not only by the PAIGC but also by the FLING.

In January 1966, Amílcar Cabral attended the Tricontinental Conference 1966 in Havana and made a great impression on Fidel Castro. As a result of this, Cuba agreed to supply artillery experts, doctors and technicians to assist in the independence struggle. The head of the Cuban Military Mission was Víctor Dreke. In the context of the ongoing Cold War, PAIGC guerrillas also received Kalashnikovs from the USSR and recoilless rifles from the People's Republic of China, with all three countries helping train guerrilla troops. SFR Yugoslavia sent a small cache of weapons to PAIGC in 1966.

The first party congress took place at liberated Cassaca in February 1964, in which both the political and military arms of the PAIGC were assessed and reorganized, with a regular army (Revolutionary Armed Forces of the People, FARP) to supplement the guerrilla forces (The People's Guerrillas).

The party also founded a Pilot School in Conakry in this period, led by Lilica Boal from 1969 onward, with the goal of educating young fighters and war orphans.

Como Island was the site of a major battle between PAIGC and Portuguese forces, in which the PAIGC took control of the island and resisted fierce counterattacks by the Portuguese, including airstrikes by FAP (Portuguese: Força Aérea Portuguesa; Portuguese Air Force) F-86 Sabres. Following the loss of Como Island, the Portuguese army, navy and the air force (FAP) began the Operation Trident, a combined arms operation to retake the island. The PAIGC fought fiercely, and the Portuguese took heavy casualties and gained ground slowly. Finally, after 71 days of fighting and 851 FAP combat sorties, the island was taken back by the Portuguese. However, less than two months later, the PAIGC would retake the island, as the Portuguese operation to capture it had depleted much of their invasion force, leaving the island vulnerable. However, Como Island ceased to be of strategic importance to Portugal following establishment of new PAIGC positions in the south, especially on the Cantanhez and Quitafine Peninsulas. Large numbers of Portuguese troops on these peninsulas were encircled and besieged by guerrillas.

Throughout the war, the Portuguese handled themselves poorly. It took them a long time to finally take the PAIGC seriously, diverting aircraft and troops based in Guinea to the conflicts in Mozambique and Angola, and by the time that the Portuguese government began to realise that the PAIGC was a significant threat to their continued rule over Guinea, it was too late. Very little was done to curtail the guerrilla operations; the Portuguese didn't try to sever the link between the populace and the PAIGC until very late in the war, and as a result, it became very dangerous for Portuguese troops to operate far from their fortresses.

By 1967, the PAIGC had carried out 147 attacks on Portuguese barracks and army encampments, and effectively controlled two-thirds of Portuguese Guinea. The following year, Portugal began a new campaign against the guerrillas with the arrival of the new governor of the colony, António de Spínola. Spínola began a massive construction campaign, building schools, hospitals, new housing and improving telecommunications and the road system, in an attempt to gain public favour in Guinea. PAIGC was the first African party to establish a comprehensive cooperative program with Sweden.

However, in 1970, the FAP began to use similar weapons to those the US was using in the Vietnam War: napalm and defoliants, the former to destroy guerrillas when they could find them, the latter to decrease the number of ambushes that occurred when they could not. Spínola's tenure as governor marked a turning point in the war: Portugal began to win battles, and in the Operation Green Sea, a Portuguese raid on Conakry, in the neighbouring Republic of Guinea, 400 amphibious troops attacked the city and freed 26 Portuguese prisoners of war kept there by the PAIGC. The USSR and Cuba began to send more weapons to Portuguese Guinea via Nigeria, notably several Ilyushin Il-14 aircraft to use as bombers.

Between August and November 1972 the party held elections to regional councils, whose members then elected a National Assembly. Whilst previous elections held by the Portuguese authorities saw suffrage limited to a few thousand people meeting tax and literacy requirements, these were arguably the first elections held in the territory under universal suffrage. Voters were presented with a list of PAIGC candidates, and had the choice to vote for or against. Around 78,000 people took part in the election, with 97% voting for the lists.

On 20 January 1973 Amílcar Cabral, was assassinated by naval commander Inocêncio Kani as part of a plan within the PAIGC to overthrow the leadership. However, despite Cabral's death, the plot failed to topple the leadership, and 94 people were subsequently found guilty of involvement, complicity or suspected complicity. Kani and at least ten others were executed in March. Later in the year independence was unilaterally declared on 24 September 1973 and was recognized by a 93–7 UN General Assembly vote in November, unprecedented as it denounced the Portuguese colonial rule as aggression and occupation. The UN recognition was prior to Portuguese recognition. The conflict had seen 1,875 Portuguese soldiers (out of 35,000 stationed in Portuguese Guinea) and some 6,000 (out of 10,000) PAIGC troops killed by the end of the eleven-year war.

== Etymology ==
The Liberated Zones were also known by various other names, including Liberated Areas, Liberated Lands, Liberated Territories, and Liberated Areas of Guinea (Bissau).

== Government ==
The Liberated Zones were governed through a civil administration, with each village administered by a five-member village committee.

=== Economy ===
Native Guineans in the Liberated Zones ceased payment of debts to Portuguese landowners as well as payment of taxes to the colonial administration.

The branch stores of the Companhia União Fabril (CUF), Mario Lima Whanon, and Manuel Pinto Brandão companies were seized and inventoried by the PAIGC in the areas they controlled, while the use of Portuguese currency in the areas under guerilla control was banned. To maintain the economy in the Liberated Zones, the PAIGC was compelled at an early stage to establish its own Marxist administrative and governmental bureaucracy, which organized agricultural production, educated farm workers on protecting crops from destruction from government attacks, and opened collective armazéns do povo (people's stores) to supply urgently needed tools and supplies in exchange for agricultural produce.

=== Ruling Party activities ===
The first party congress of the PAIGC took place at liberated Cassaca in February 1964, in which both the political and military arms of the PAIGC were assessed and reorganized, with a regular army (Revolutionary Armed Forces of the People, FARP) to supplement the guerrilla forces (The People's Guerrillas).

The party also founded a Pilot School in Conakry in this period, led by Lilica Boal from 1969 onward, with the goal of educating young fighters and war orphans.

The PAIGC had launched a flurry of political activity – having judged in roughly 1971 that independence was feasible and even imminent, its leadership had begun preparing for independence, including by creating new domestic political structures (with elections held in 1972, in which João Bernardo Vieira was elected as President of the National People's Assembly) and by conducting an intense diplomatic offensive abroad. The PAIGC established a 120‐member National Assembly and circa 200 primary schools have been reportedly set up to serve 20,000 students.

It was insisted that women hold two out of every five political positions in the Liberated Zones. The PAIGC fought to end child marriage, and increased access to education for girls.

== Territorial development ==
=== 1963 ===
Early 1963, PAIGC cadres, stationed south of the Geba River estuary, attacked Portuguese garrisons in Tite and Catió – bases deliberately established in the middle of PAIGC strongholds to serve as bases for surveillance and counter-insurgency.

By July 1963, PAIGC had consolidated its military position in the southern littoral, and had also gained "a tenuous foothold" in the Mansôa–Mansaba–Oio triangle, north of the Geba estuary.

=== 1972 ===
By the beginning of 1972, although territorial boundaries remained blurry, most of the country belonged to the Liberated Zones. Overall in 1972, two-third of State of Guinea of Portugal, was under the control of PAIGC.

=== 1973 ===
By 1973 the PAIGC controlled most of the interior of the country, while the coastal and estuary towns, including the main population and economic centres remained under Portuguese control.

== Foreign relations ==
=== Portugal ===
António de Spínola and other Portuguese commanders told the press that the Liberated Zones were a myth, that the entire territory remained under the control of Portuguese forces.

=== Other nations ===
The Liberated Zones were supported by Cuba, Soviet Union, People's Republic of China, Czechoslovak Socialist Republic and Socialist Federal Republic of Yugoslavia.

== List of leaders ==
No.	Portrait	Name (Birth–Death)	Term of office			Party
No.	Portrait	Name (Birth–Death)	Took office	Left office	Time in office	Party
1		Amílcar Cabral (1924–1973); De facto leader as Secretary General of the PAIGC	c. 23 January 1963	20 January 1973	c. 9 years, 363 days	PAIGC
2		Triumvirate; Members: Luís Cabral (1931–2009), Aristides Pereira (1923 –2011) and Dr. Vitor Monteiro (?)	c. 20 January 1973	24 September 1973	c. 247 days	Party Memberships of the Triumvirate Members: PAIGC
3		Luís Cabral (1931–2009); Chairman of the Council of State of Guinea-Bissau	24 September 1973	10 September 1974	351 days	PAIGC

== See also ==
- Liberated Area of Cambodia
- Liberated Areas (Oman)
