= Operation Trident =

Operation Trident may refer to:

- Operation Trident (1963), a military operation during the Portuguese Colonial War in Guinea in 1964
- Operation Trident (1971), an operation of the Indian Navy that attacked Karachi, Pakistan
- Operation Trident (Metropolitan Police), a Metropolitan Police Service unit dealing with gun crime in London

== See also ==
- Operation Green Trident
- Trident Conference (1943 Allied Conference)
