= African Party for the Independence of Guinea and Cape Verde =

Political party in Guinea-Bissau

African Party for the Independence of Guinea and Cape Verde Partido Africano para a Independência da Guiné e Cabo Verde
- Abbreviation: PAIGC
- Leader: Domingos Simões Pereira
- Founder: Henri Labéry; Amílcar Cabral
- Founded: 19 September 1956
- Headquarters: Bissau, Guinea-Bissau
- Youth wing: Juventude Africana Amílcar Cabral (JAAC)
- Women's wing: União Democrática das Mulheres da Guiné (UDEMU)
- Ideology: Democratic socialism Pan-Africanism; Historical: Marxism; Marxism-Leninism; Left-wing nationalism
- Political position: Centre-left; Historical: Far-left
- National affiliation: Inclusive Alliance Platform – Terra Ranka
- International affiliation: World Anti-Imperialist Platform; Socialist International (consultative)
- Colors: Red, green and yellow
- Slogan: Unidade e Luta ("Unity and Struggle")
- National People's Assembly: 54 / 102 (53%)

Party flag

Website
- www.paigc.gw

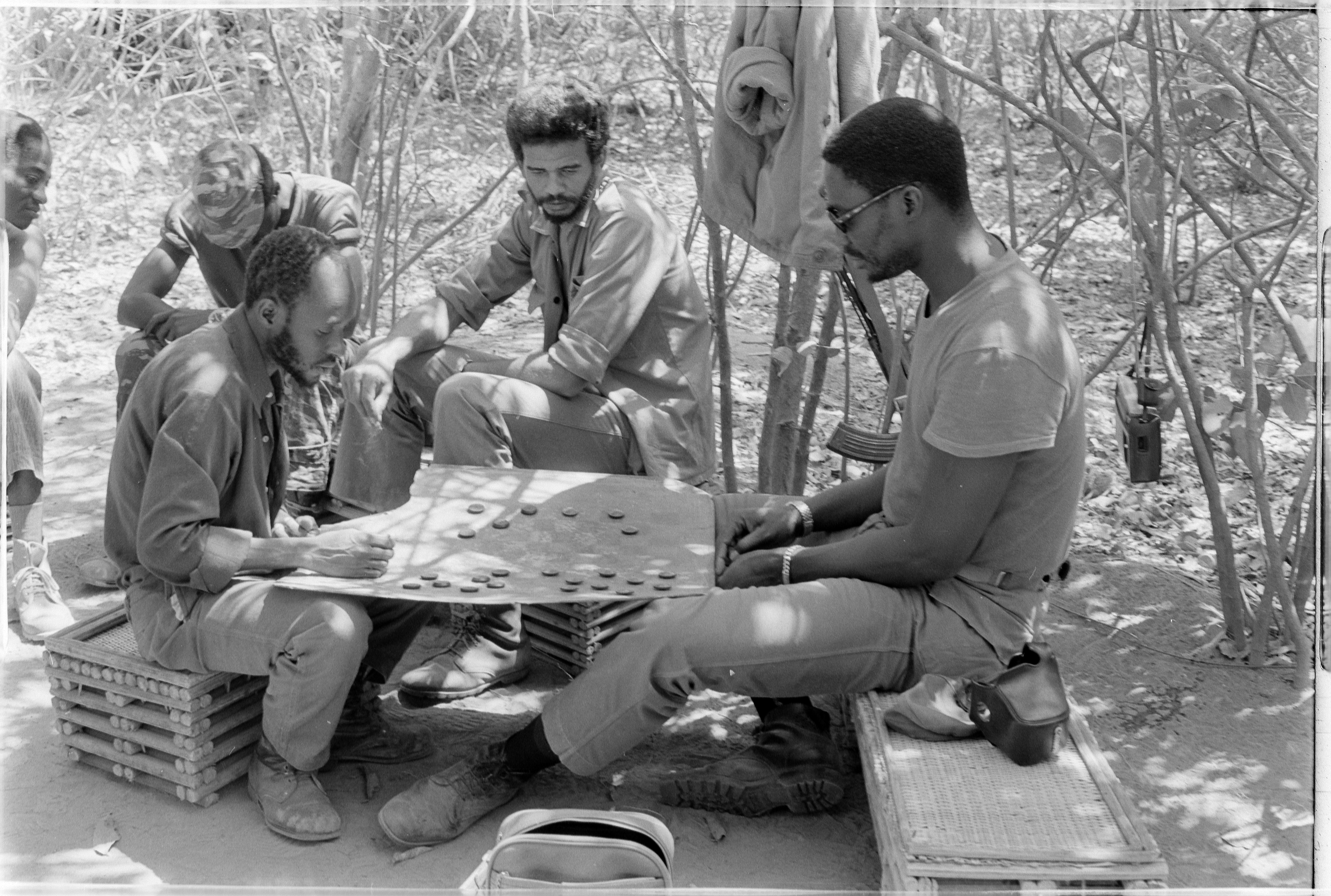
PAIGC Military commanders on the northern frontline, 1974

The African Party for the Independence of Guinea and Cape Verde (Portuguese: Partido Africano para a Independência da Guiné e Cabo Verde, PAIGC) is a political party in Guinea-Bissau. Originally formed to peacefully campaign for independence from Portugal, the party turned to armed conflict in the 1960s and was one of the belligerents in the Guinea-Bissau War of Independence. Towards the end of the war, the party established a socialist one-party state, which remained intact until multi-party democracy was introduced in the early 1990s. Although the party won the first multi-party elections in 1994, it was removed from power in the 1999–2000 elections. However, it returned to office after winning parliamentary elections in 2004 and presidential elections in 2005, since which it has remained the largest party in the National People's Assembly.

The PAIGC also governed Cape Verde, from its independence in 1975 to 1980. After the 1980 coup d'état in Guinea-Bissau, the Cape Verdean branch of the PAIGC was converted into a separate party, the African Party for the Independence of Cape Verde.

== History ==
=== Pre-independence ===
The party was established in Bissau on 19 September 1956 as the African Party of Independence (Partido Africano da Independência), and was based on the Movement for the National Independence of Portuguese Guinea (Movimento para Independência Nacional da Guiné Portuguesa) founded in 1954 by Henri Labéry and Amílcar Cabral. The party had six founding members; Cabral, his brother Luís, Aristides Pereira, Fernando Fortes, Júlio Almeida and Elisée Turpin. Rafael Paula Barbosa became its first president, whilst Amílcar Cabral was appointed secretary-general.

The Pidjiguiti massacre in 1959 saw Portuguese soldiers open fire on protesting dockworkers, killing 50. The massacre caused a large segment of the population to swing towards the PAIGC's push for independence, although the Portuguese authorities still considered the movement to be irrelevant, and took no serious action in trying to suppress it. However, the massacre convinced the PAIGC leadership to resort to armed struggle against the Portuguese, and in September 1959 the party established a new headquarters in Conakry in neighbouring Guinea. In 1961, the PAIGC combined with the Mozambican FRELIMO and Angolan MPLA to establish the Conference of Nationalist Organizations of the Portuguese Colonies (CONCP), a common party to coordinate the struggles for independence of Portuguese colonies across Africa. The three groups were often represented at international events by the CONCP.

Armed struggle against the Portuguese began in March 1962 with an abortive attack by PAIGC guerrillas on Praia. Guerrilla warfare was largely concentrated to the mainland Guinea, however, as logistical reasons prevented an armed struggle on the Cape Verde islands. On the Cape Verde islands PAIGC worked in a clandestine manner. After being nearly crippled militarily, Amílcar Cabral ordered that sabotage be the PAIGC's main weapon until military strength could be regained. On 23 January 1963 the PAIGC started the Guinea-Bissau War of Independence by attacking a Portuguese garrison in Tite. Frequent attacks in the north also took place. In that same month, attacks on police stations in Fulacunda and Buba were carried out not only by the PAIGC but also by the FLING.

In January 1966, Amílcar Cabral attended the Tricontinental Conference 1966 in Havana and made a great impression on Fidel Castro. As a result of this, Cuba agreed to supply artillery experts, doctors and technicians to assist in the independence struggle. The head of the Cuban Military Mission was Víctor Dreke. In the context of the ongoing Cold War, PAIGC guerrillas also received Kalashnikovs from the USSR and recoilless rifles from the People's Republic of China, with all three countries helping train guerrilla troops. SFR Yugoslavia sent a small cache of weapons to PAIGC in 1966.

The first party congress took place at liberated Cassaca in February 1964, in which both the political and military arms of the PAIGC were assessed and reorganized, with a regular army (Revolutionary Armed Forces of the People, FARP) to supplement the guerrilla forces (The People's Guerrillas).

The party also founded a Pilot School in Conakry in this period, led by Lilica Boal from 1969 onward, with the goal of educating young fighters and war orphans.

Como Island was the site of a major battle between PAIGC and Portuguese forces, in which the PAIGC took control of the island and resisted fierce counterattacks by the Portuguese, including airstrikes by FAP (Portuguese: Força Aérea Portuguesa; Portuguese Air Force) F-86 Sabres. Following the loss of Como Island, the Portuguese army, navy and the air force (FAP) began the Operation Trident, a combined arms operation to retake the island. The PAIGC fought fiercely, and the Portuguese took heavy casualties and gained ground slowly. Finally, after 71 days of fighting and 851 FAP combat sorties, the island was taken back by the Portuguese. However, less than two months later, the PAIGC would retake the island, as the Portuguese operation to capture it had depleted much of their invasion force, leaving the island vulnerable. However, Como Island ceased to be of strategic importance to Portugal following establishment of new PAIGC positions in the south, especially on the Cantanhez and Quitafine Peninsulas. Large numbers of Portuguese troops on these peninsulas were encircled and besieged by guerrillas.

Throughout the war, the Portuguese handled themselves poorly. It took them a long time to finally take the PAIGC seriously, diverting aircraft and troops based in Guinea to the conflicts in Mozambique and Angola, and by the time that the Portuguese government began to realise that the PAIGC was a significant threat to their continued rule over Guinea, it was too late. Very little was done to curtail the guerrilla operations; the Portuguese didn't try to sever the link between the populace and the PAIGC until very late in the war, and as a result, it became very dangerous for Portuguese troops to operate far from their fortresses.

By 1967, the PAIGC had carried out 147 attacks on Portuguese barracks and army encampments, and effectively controlled two-thirds of Portuguese Guinea. The following year, Portugal began a new campaign against the guerrillas with the arrival of the new governor of the colony, António de Spínola. Spínola began a massive construction campaign, building schools, hospitals, new housing and improving telecommunications and the road system, in an attempt to gain public favour in Guinea. PAIGC was the first African party to establish a comprehensive cooperative program with Sweden.

However, in 1970, the FAP began to use similar weapons to those the US was using in the Vietnam War: napalm and defoliants, the former to destroy guerrillas when they could find them, the latter to decrease the number of ambushes that occurred when they could not. Spínola's tenure as governor marked a turning point in the war: Portugal began to win battles, and in the Operation Green Sea, a Portuguese raid on Conakry, in the neighbouring Republic of Guinea, 400 amphibious troops attacked the city and freed 26 Portuguese prisoners of war kept there by the PAIGC. The USSR and Cuba began to send more weapons to Portuguese Guinea via Nigeria, notably several Ilyushin Il-14 aircraft to use as bombers.

Between August and November 1972 the party held elections to regional councils, whose members then elected a National Assembly. Whilst previous elections held by the Portuguese authorities saw suffrage limited to a few thousand people meeting tax and literacy requirements, these were arguably the first elections held in the territory under universal suffrage. Voters were presented with a list of PAIGC candidates, and had the choice to vote for or against. Around 78,000 people took part in the election, with 97% voting for the lists.

On 20 January 1973 Amílcar Cabral, was assassinated by naval commander Inocêncio Kani as part of a plan within the PAIGC to overthrow the leadership. However, despite Cabral's death, the plot failed to topple the leadership, and 94 people were subsequently found guilty of involvement, complicity or suspected complicity. Kani and at least ten others were executed in March. Later in the year independence was unilaterally declared on 24 September 1973 and was recognized by a 93–7 UN General Assembly vote in November, unprecedented as it denounced the Portuguese colonial rule as aggression and occupation. The UN recognition was prior to Portuguese recognition. The conflict had seen 1,875 Portuguese soldiers (out of 35,000 stationed in Portuguese Guinea) and some 6,000 (out of 10,000) PAIGC troops killed by the end of the eleven-year war.

==== Gallery ====
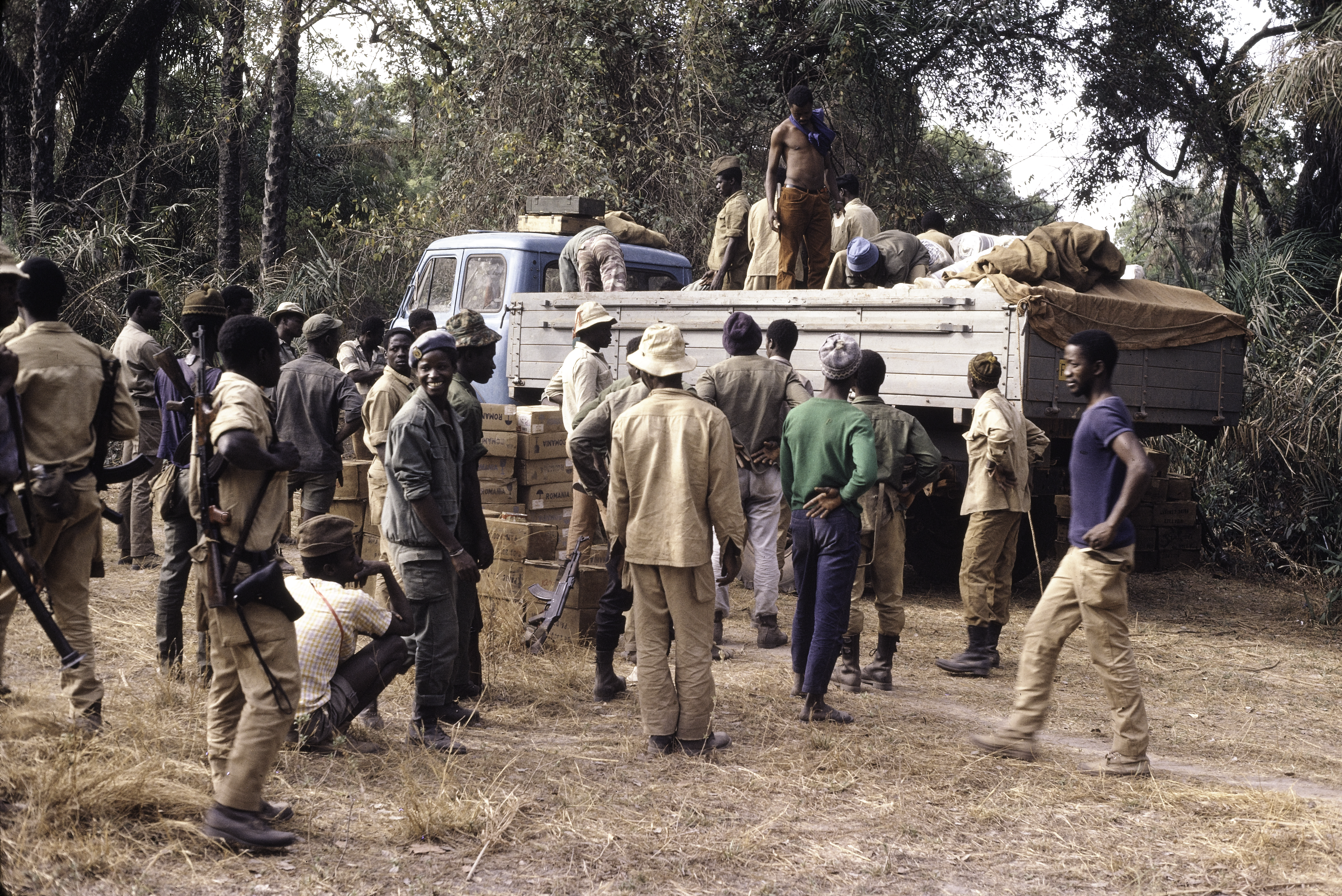
PAIGC soldiers loading weapons on a truck, Guinea-Bissau, 1973

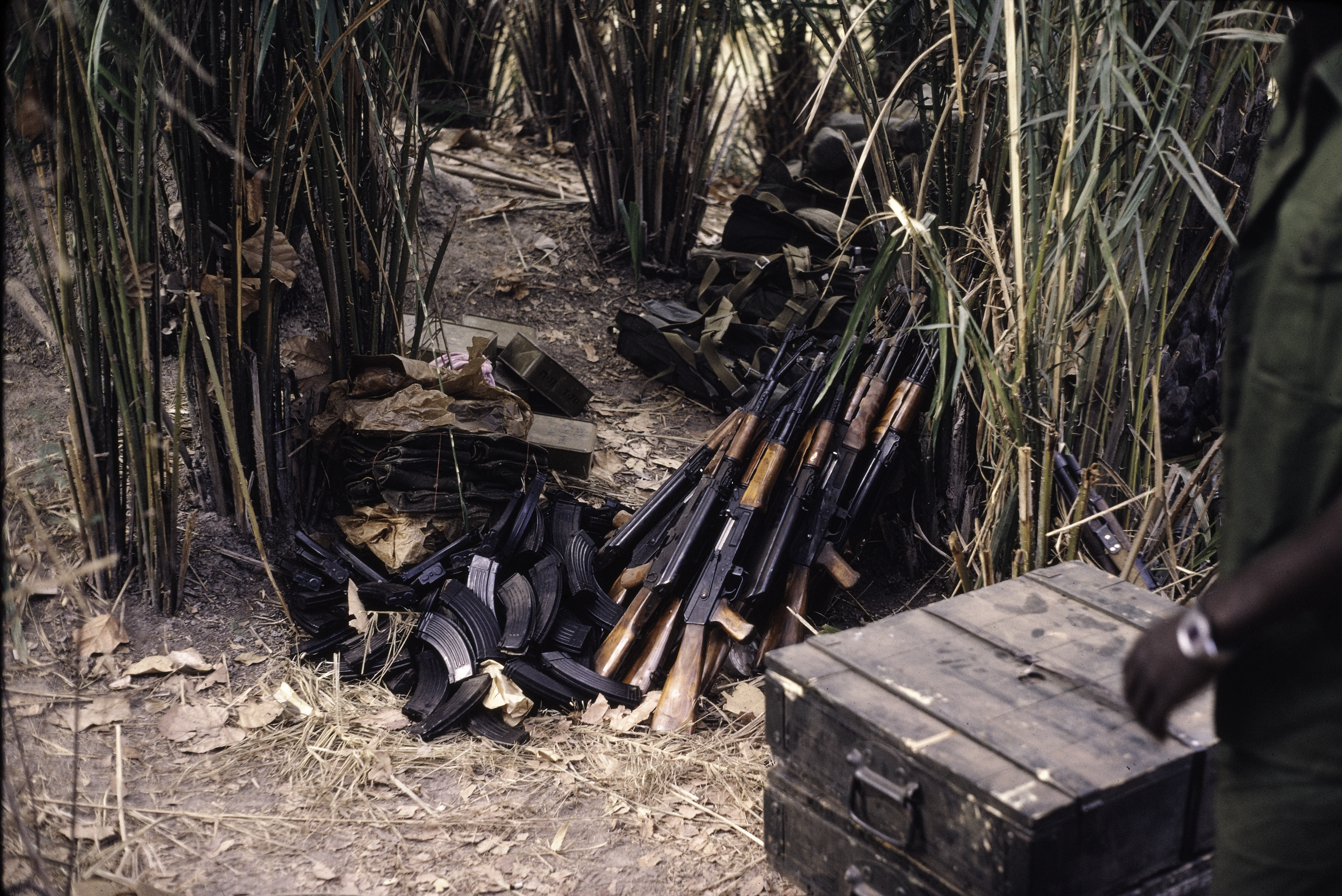
Kalashnikovs for Hermangono, 1973

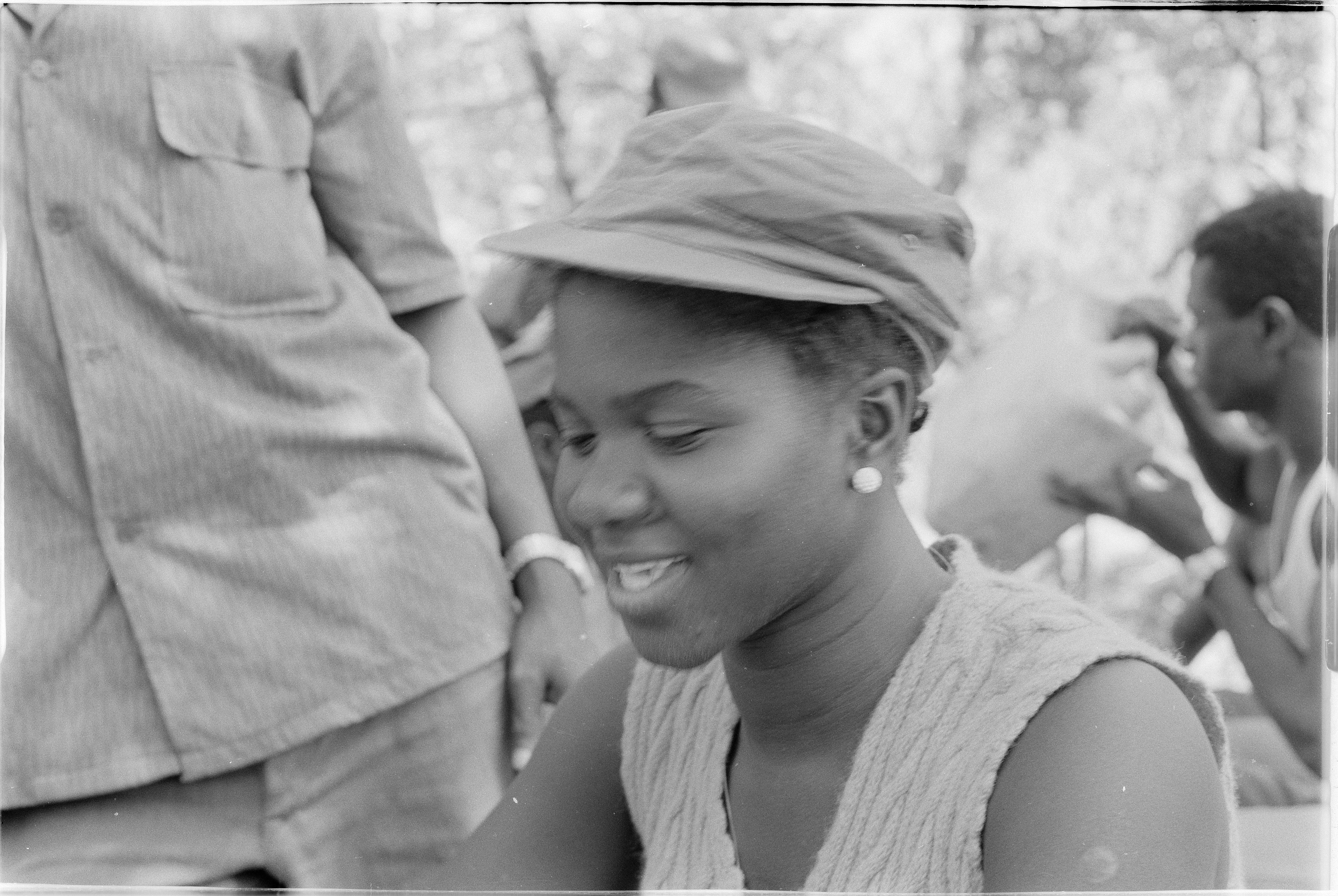
Female soldier playing cards, Guinea-Bissau, 1973

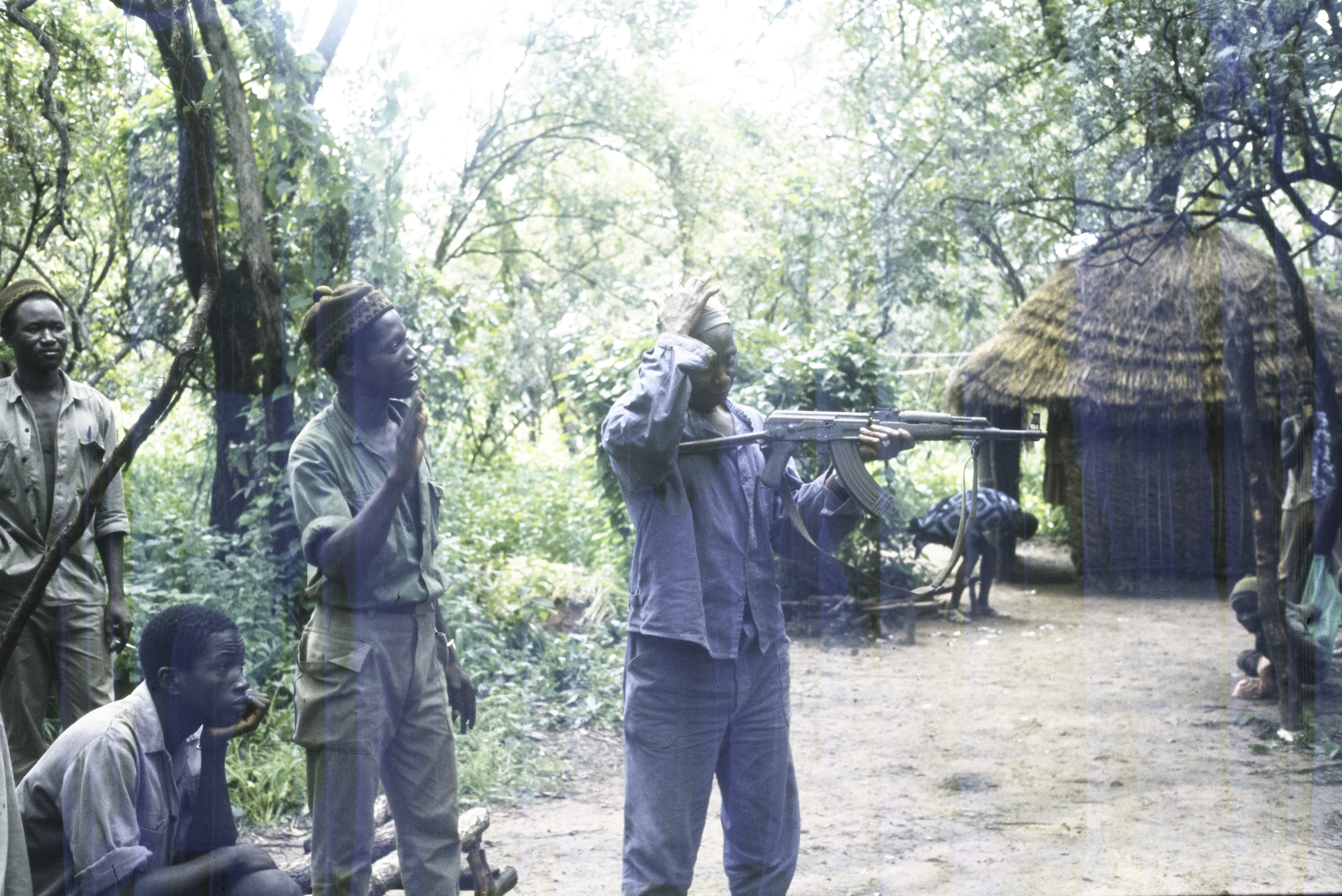
PAIGC recruits learning how to shoot, Ziguinchor, Senegal, 1973

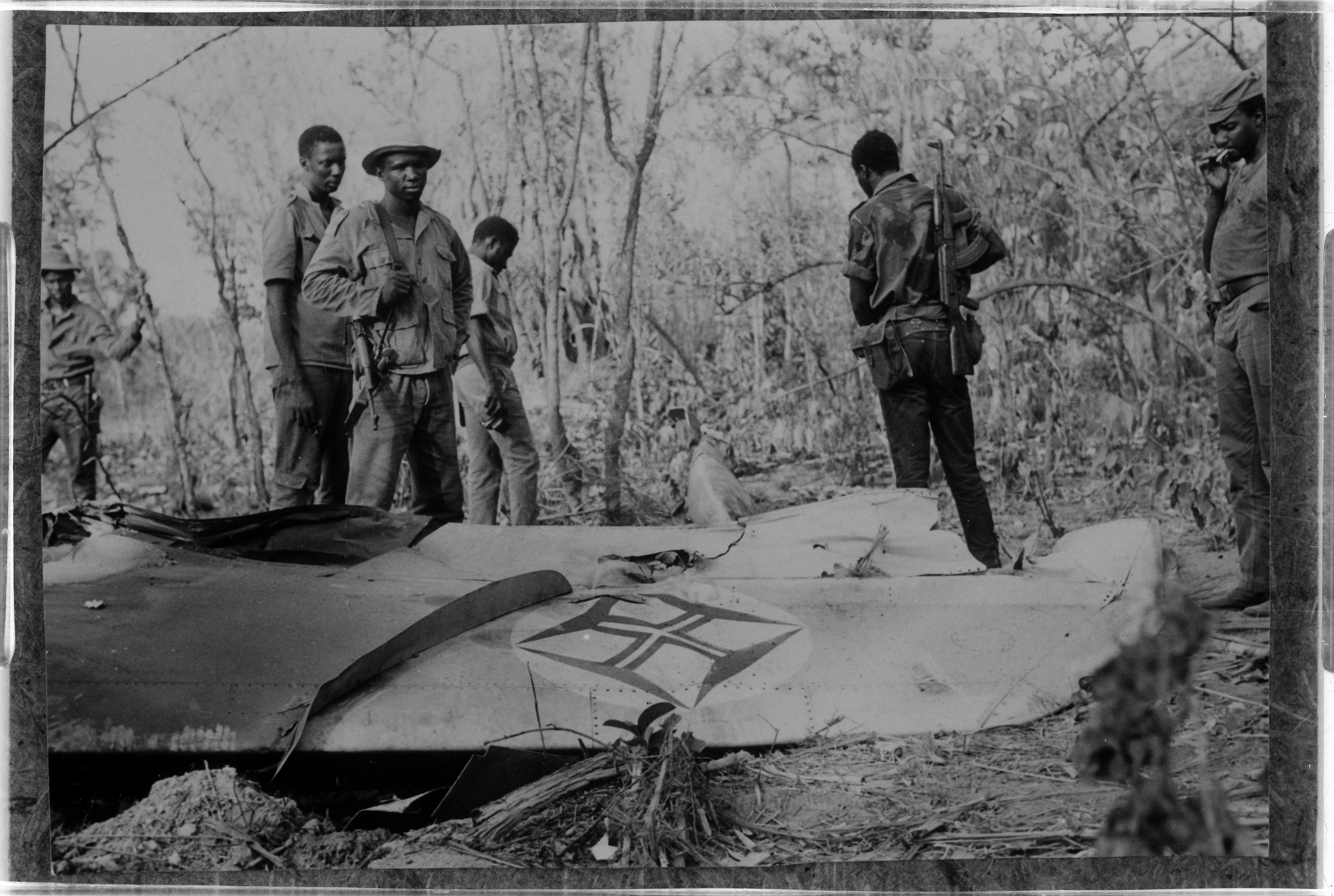
Portuguese plane shot down in Guinea-Bissau with PAIGC soldiers, 1974

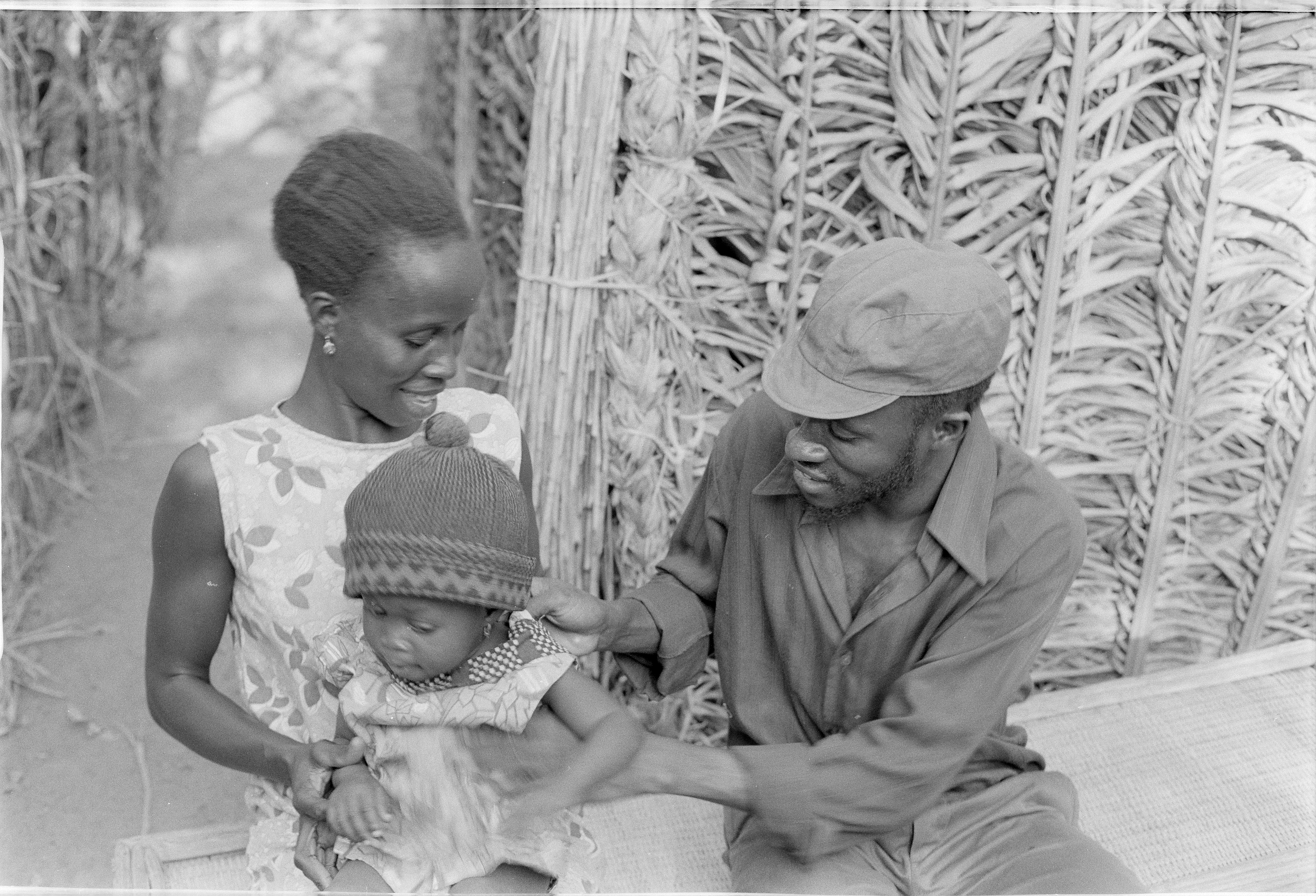
PAIGC soldier with his family in a military camp, Guinea-Bissau, 1974

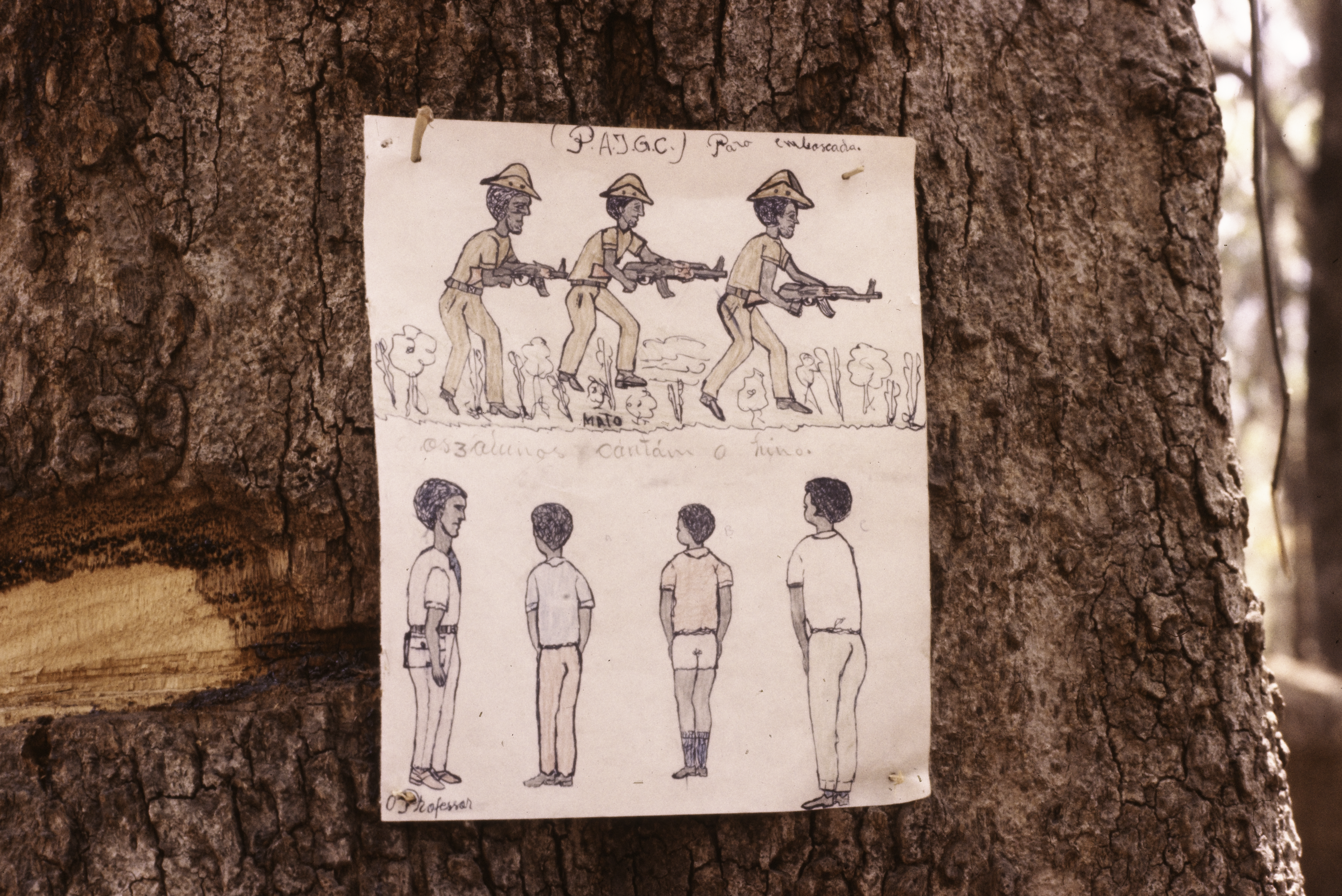
Drawings showing PAIGC soldiers, Farim, Guinea-Bissau, 1974

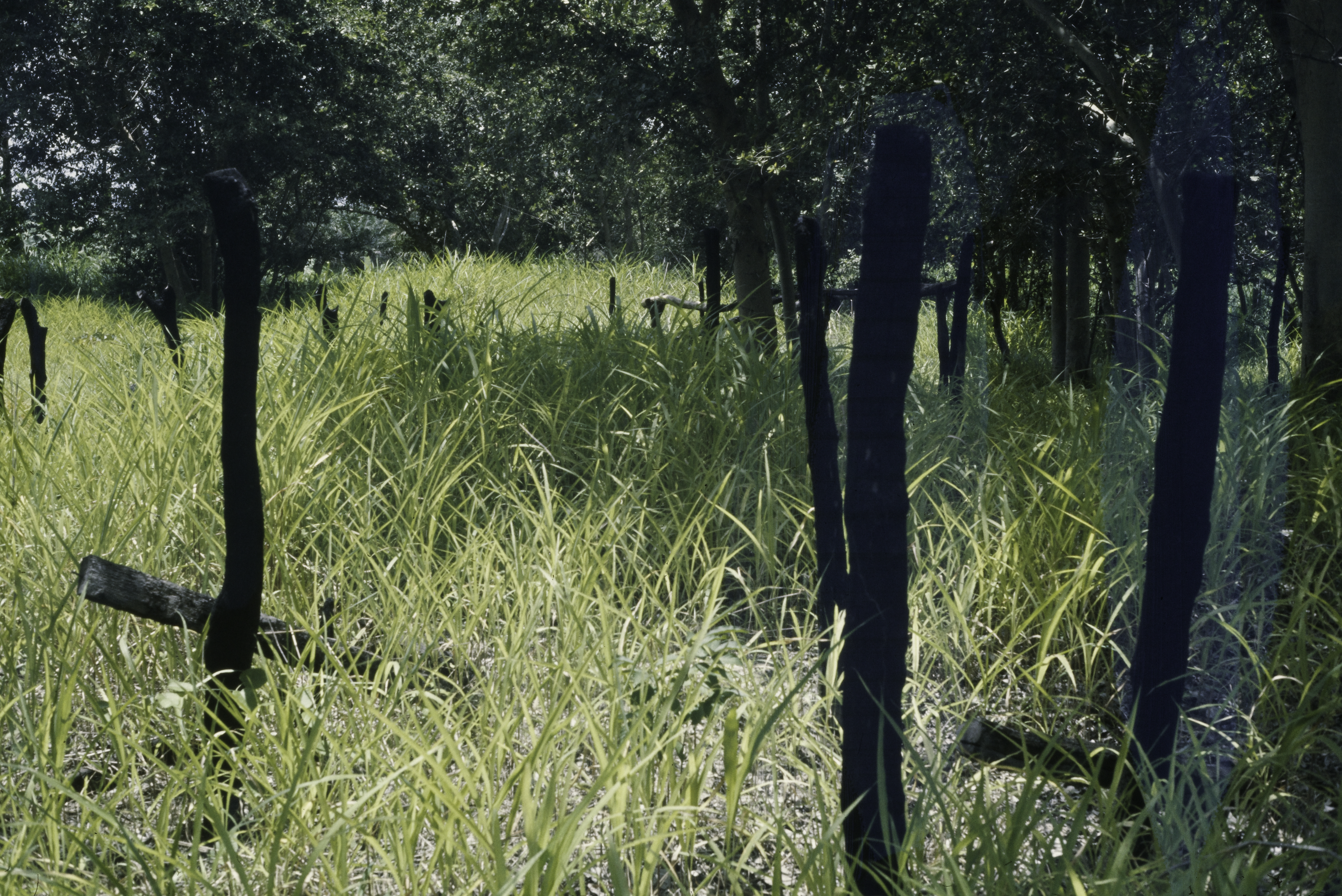
Village burnt down by the Portuguese, Guinea-Bissau, 1974

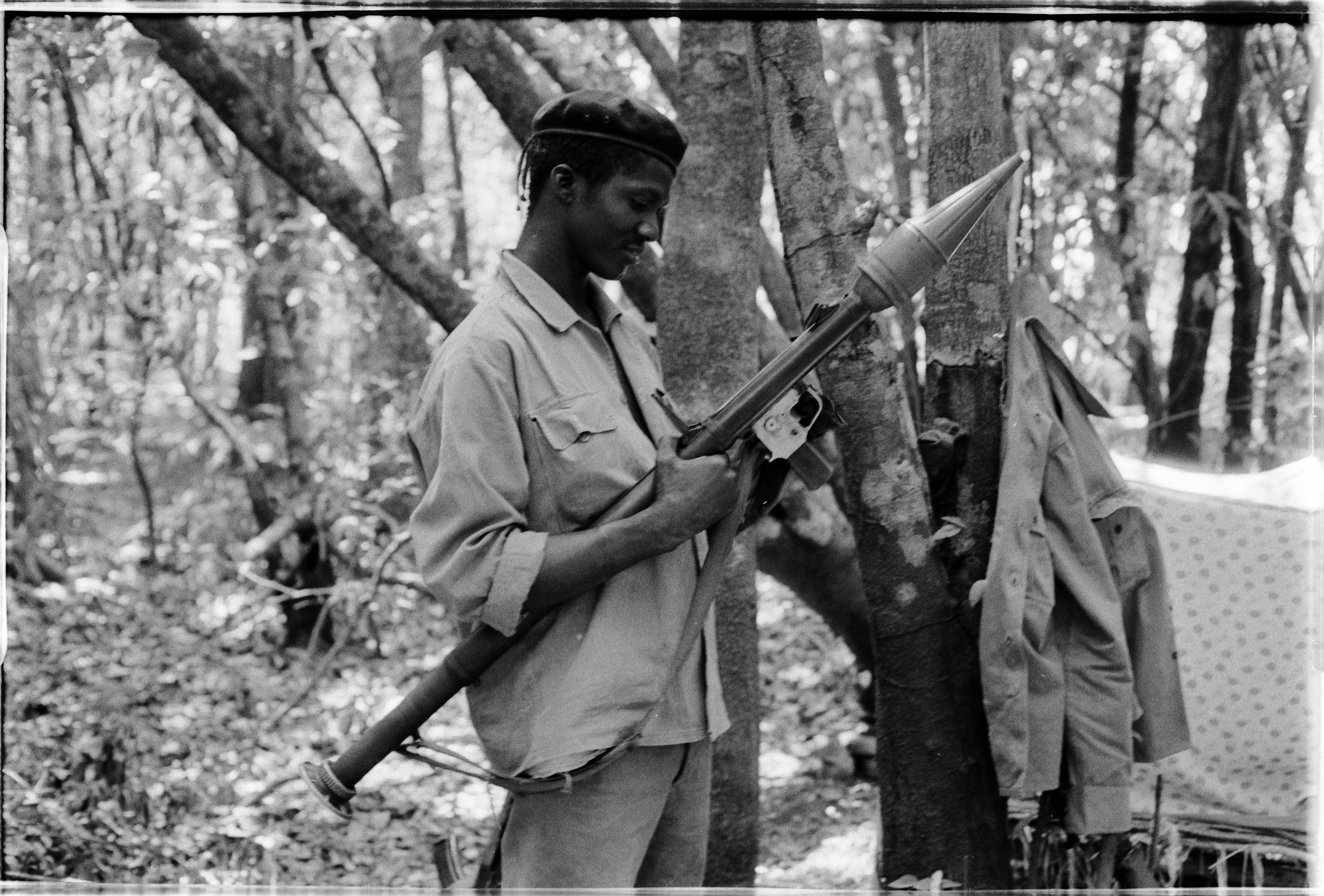
PAIGC soldier with a rocket-propelled grenade, Manten military base in the liberated areas, Guinea-Bissau, 1974

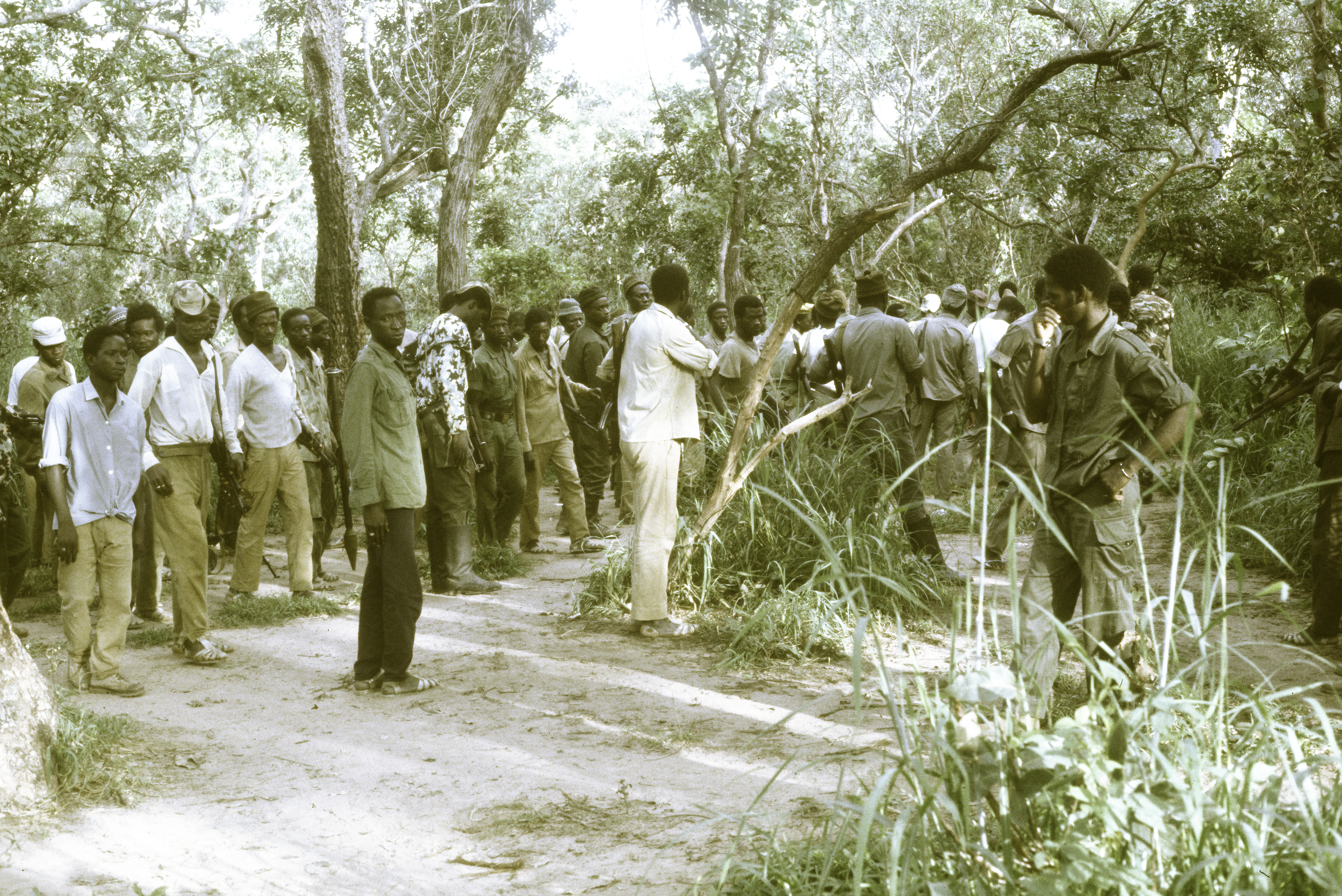
Morning roll call, Hermangono, Guinea-Bissau, 1974

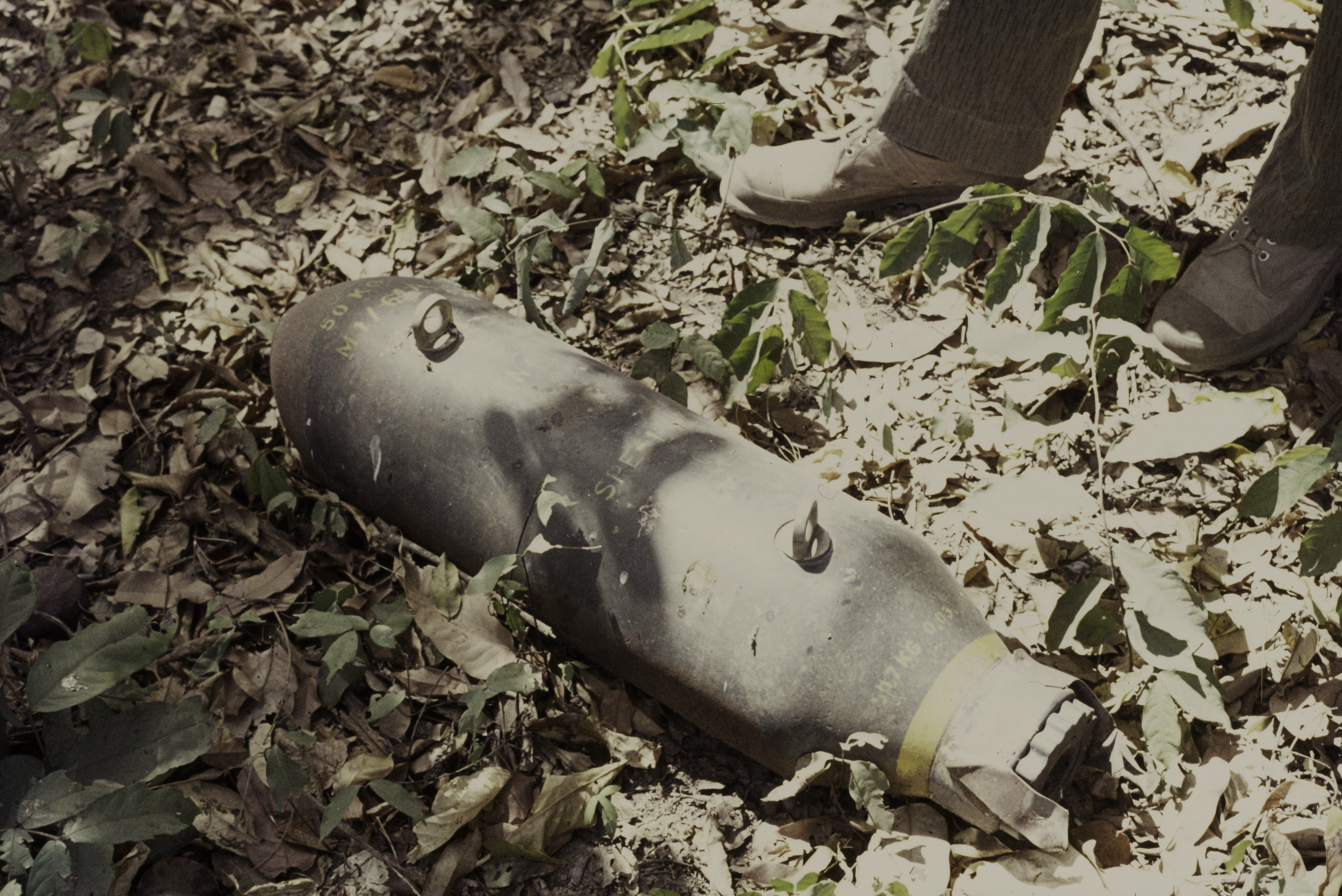
Unexploded Portuguese bomb, Canjambari, Guinea-Bissau, 1974

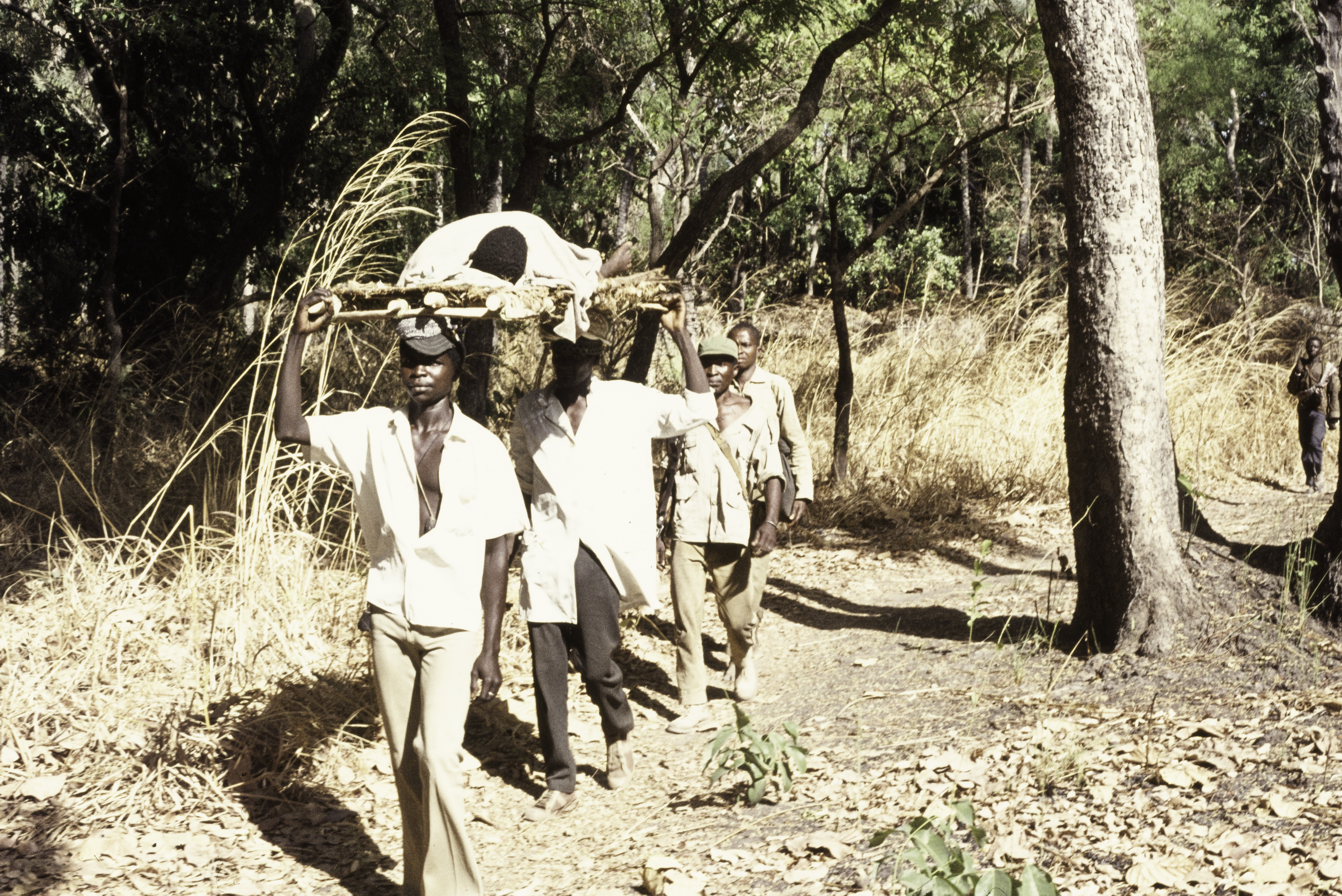
Armed escort carries a wounded person to the Senegalese border, Sara, Guinea-Bissau, 1974

=== Post-independence ===
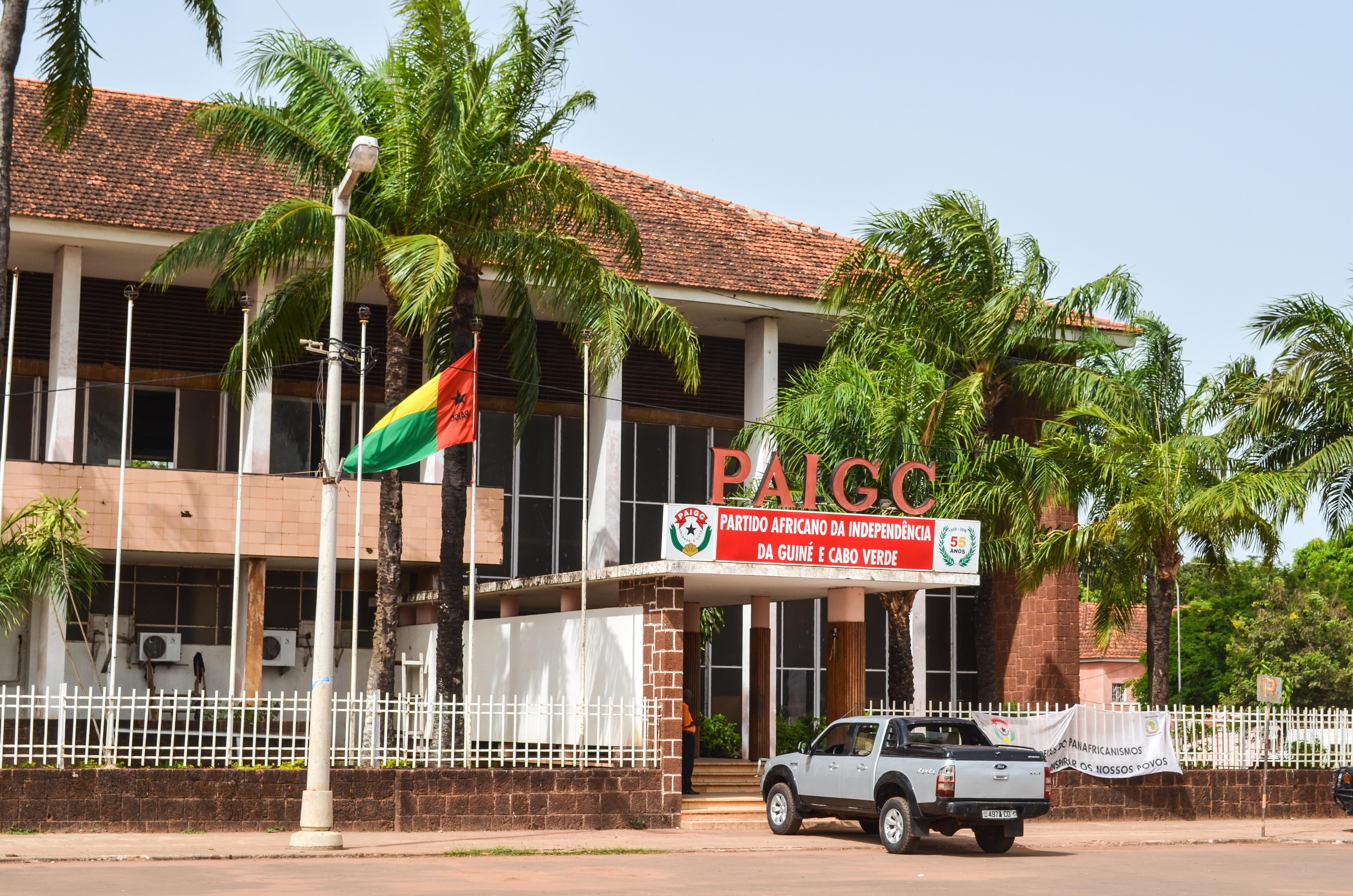
PAIGC headquarters in Bissau

After achieving independence, the PAIGC was instituted as the sole legal political party of Guinea-Bissau and Cape Verde, with Luís Cabral becoming President of Guinea-Bissau. A second set of one-party elections were held in 1976 and 1977. Although the PAIGC strove for a union between Guinea-Bissau and Cape Verde, the union finally broke down following a military coup led by João Bernardo Vieira against Luís Cabral in November 1980. The Cape Verdean branch of PAIGC was subsequently converted into a separate party, the African Party for the Independence of Cape Verde (PAICV).

Under Vieira, the party continued to govern the country in the 1980s and 1990s. One-party elections were held in 1984 and 1989, and Vieira was re-elected as PAIGC Secretary-General at the party's fourth congress in November 1986. Following the introduction of multi-party politics in May 1991, the first multi-party elections were held in 1994. The general elections also saw the introduction of the direct election of the president. Vieira beat Kumba Ialá of the Party for Social Renewal (PRS) in the run-off, while the PAIGC won 62 out of 100 seats in the National People's Assembly with 46% of the vote.

Vieira was re-elected for another four-year term as President of PAIGC in mid-May 1998 at the party's sixth congress, with 438 votes in favor, eight opposed, and four abstaining; the post of Secretary-General was abolished at this congress. An outbreak of civil war in June 1998 eventually led to the ousting of Vieira in May 1999. A few days later, former Prime Minister Manuel Saturnino da Costa was named acting President of the PAIGC on 12 May 1999. Vieira was expelled from PAIGC at a party congress in September 1999 for "treasonable offences, support and incitement to warfare, and practices incompatible with the statutes of the party". Francisco Benante, the leader of reformists within the party and the only civilian in the transitional military junta, was elected as the President of PAIGC at the end of the congress on 9 September 1999. Benante's candidacy was supported by the junta, and he received 174 votes against 133 votes for the only opposing candidate.

General elections were held in November 1999, with a presidential runoff on 16 January 2000. The elections saw the PAIGC lose power for the first time as PAIGC candidate Malam Bacai Sanhá lost to PRS leader Ialá in the presidential elections, whilst the PAIGC were reduced to being the third-largest party in the National People's Assembly after being beaten by the PRS and the Resistance of Guinea-Bissau-Bafatá Movement.

The 2004 legislative elections saw the PAIGC regain its position as the largest party, winning 45 of 100 seats. In May 2004 it formed a government with party leader, Carlos Gomes Júnior becoming prime minister. In the 2005 presidential election, PAIGC candidate Malam Bacai Sanhá was defeated in the second round by Vieira, who had returned from exile and ran as an independent. A few weeks after taking office, Vieira dismissed Carlos Gomes Júnior as prime minister and appointed Aristides Gomes, who had formerly been a high-ranking member of PAIGC but had left the party to support Vieira.

In March 2007, the PAIGC formed a three-party alliance with the PRS and the United Social Democratic Party as the three parties sought to form a new government. This led to a successful no-confidence vote against Aristides Gomes and his resignation late in the month; on 9 April Martinho Ndafa Kabi, the choice of the three parties, was appointed prime minister by Vieira, and on 17 April a new government was named, composed of ministers from the three parties. PAIGC withdrew its backing for Kabi on 29 February 2008, stating that this was done "to avoid acts of indiscipline threatening cohesion and unity in the party".

The PAIGC's seventh Ordinary Congress was held in Gabú in June 2008. Malam Bacai Sanhá, the party's presidential candidate in 2000 and 2005, challenged Gomes for the party leadership, but Gomes was re-elected for a five-year term as President of PAIGC by a vote of 578–355. Kabi, Cipriano Cassama (considered a dissident within the party and associated with Aristides Gomes), and Baciro Dja also contested the leadership election, but attracted comparatively little support.

After Kabi dismissed the directors of customs, taxes and the treasury on 25 July 2008 without notifying the party, the PAIGC decided to withdraw from the three-party stability pact that was signed in March 2007. Vieira then dismissed Kabi and appointed Carlos Correia as prime minister on 5 August. Parliamentary elections were subsequently held in November 2008, with the PAIGC winning two-thirds of the seats. In presidential elections the following year, Sanhá defeated Kumba Ialá in the run-off.

After Sanhá's death in January 2012, early presidential elections were held. Carlos Gomes Júnior was nominated as the PAIGC candidate, and advanced to the runoff alongside Iála, but a military coup in April prevented it taking place. General elections were eventually held in 2014, and saw PAIGC candidate José Mário Vaz elected president, whilst the party also retained its majority in the National People's Assembly, winning 57 of the 102 seats.

The party contested the 2023 legislative election as part of a broad coalition, the Inclusive Alliance Platform – Terra Ranka, that included UM, PCD, PSD and MDG and won a majority of the seats.

== Election results ==
=== Presidential elections ===
Election	Party candidate	Votes	%	Votes	%	Result
Election	Party candidate	First round		Second round		Result
1994	João Bernardo Vieira	142,577	46.20%	161,083	52.02%	Elected ✓
1999–2000	Malam Bacai Sanhá	86,724	23.37%	97,670	28.0%	Lost ✗
2005	Malam Bacai Sanhá	158,276	35.45%	196,759	47.65%	Lost ✗
2009	Malam Bacai Sanhá	133,786	37.54%	224,259	63.31%	Elected ✓
2012	Carlos Gomes Júnior	154,797	48.97%	–		Cancelled ✗
2014	José Mário Vaz	257,572	40.89%	364,394	61.92%	Elected ✓
2019	Domingos Simões Pereira	222,870	40.13%	254,468	46.45%	Lost ✗

=== National People's Assembly ===
Election	Votes	%	Seats	+/–	Position	Government
1972	75,163	96.97%	120 / 120	New	1st	Sole legal party
1976–77	136,022	80.04%	150 / 150	New	1st	Sole legal party
1984			150 / 150	0	1st	Sole legal party
1989	214,201	95.80%	150 / 150	0	1st	Sole legal party
1994	134,982	46.39%	62 / 100	▼88	1st	Majority
1999	64,215	18.04%	24 / 102	▼38	▼3rd	Opposition
2004	145,316	33.88%	45 / 100	▲21	▲1st	Coalition
2008	227,350	49.52%	67 / 100	▲22	1st	Majority
2014	281,408	47.98%	57 / 102	▼10	1st	Majority
2019	212,148	35.22%	47 / 102	▼10	1st	Coalition (2019–2020)
2019	212,148	35.22%	47 / 102	▼10	1st	Opposition (2020–2023)
2023	Part of the Inclusive Alliance Platform		54 / 100	▲8	1st	Majority (2023–2025)
2023	Part of the Inclusive Alliance Platform		54 / 100	▲8	1st	Opposition (2025)
2025	TBA	TBA	1st	TBA		

== Foreign support ==
During the Cold War, the PAIGC received support from the governments of China, Cuba, Soviet Union, Senegal, Guinea, Libya, Algeria, Poland, Czechoslovakia and Ghana.

== See also ==
- Liberated Zones (Guinea-Bissau) – territory controlled by the PAIGC
- Decolonization of Africa
- Francisca Pereira
