= 1972 Portuguese Guinea National Assembly election =

- August–October 1972
- 91 of 120 seats of the National Assembly; 61 seats needed for a majority
Party	Leader	Vote %	Seats	+/–
PAIGC	Amílcar Cabral	96.97	91	New
This lists parties that won seats. See the complete results below.
Results by region

Indirect elections to a National Assembly were held in the parts of Portuguese Guinea held by the rebel African Party for the Independence of Guinea and Cape Verde (PAIGC) between August and October 1972, but not in the Portuguese-controlled areas of Bissau, Bolama, the Bijagós Islands and Bafatá.

A single list of PAIGC candidates for Regional Councils was approved by 97% of voters with a 93.4% turnout. The number of people voting was approximately 32% of the voting-age population.

== Electoral system ==
Voters elected 273 members of 11 regional councils. The elected councillors then convened to elect 91 members of the 120-seat National Assembly. The remaining 29 seats were to represent the four regions still under Portuguese control, and these members were chosen by the PAIGC.

The elections took six weeks, with ballot papers carried around the country on foot. The ballot papers had been printed in neighbouring Guinea.

== Results ==
Party	Votes	%	Seats
African Party for the Independence of Guinea and Cape Verde	75,163	96.97	120
Against	2,352	3.03	–
Total	77,515	100.00	120
Registered voters/turnout	83,000	–	
Source: Nohlen et al.

== Aftermath ==
The new National Assembly met for the first time in Boe on 24 September 1973.
