= 1976–77 Guinea-Bissau parliamentary election =

- 19 December 1976 – January 1977
- 150 seats of the National People's Assembly; 76 seats needed for a majority
Party	Leader	Vote %	Seats	+/–
PAIGC	Luís Cabral	80.04	150	+30
This lists parties that won seats. See the complete results below.
Results by district
President before	President after
Luís Cabral; PAIGC	Luís Cabral; PAIGC

Indirect parliamentary elections were held in Guinea-Bissau between 19 December 1976 and mid-January 1977 (voting had been due to end on 29 December, but was extended), the first since independence from Portugal. At the time, the country was a one-party state with the African Party for the Independence of Guinea and Cape Verde (PAIGC) as the sole legal party. A single, official list of PAIGC candidates was presented to voters, although in some areas people voted for unofficial candidates, who achieved almost 20% of the national vote. The Assembly elected Luís Cabral to the post of President on 13 March 1977.

== Electoral system ==
The indirect election saw voters elect members of eight regional councils, who in turn elected the 150 members of the National People's Assembly. At least 50% of registered voters had to cast ballot in an electoral district for the election to be valid. Anyone over the age of 15 and with Guinea-Bissau citizenship was entitled to vote, unless they had been disqualified.

== Results ==
Party	Votes	%	Seats
African Party for the Independence of Guinea and Cape Verde	136,022	80.04	150
Independents	33,918	19.96	0
Total	169,940	100.00	150
Source: IPU
