= 1989 Guinea-Bissau parliamentary election =

Indirect parliamentary elections were held in Guinea-Bissau on 15 June 1989. At the time, the country was a one-party state with the African Party for the Independence of Guinea and Cape Verde as the sole legal party. Voter turnout was 53.2%, and around 60% of the Assembly members were elected for the first time. The Assembly re-elected João Bernardo Vieira to the post of President on 19 June.

== Electoral system ==
The indirect election saw voters elect the 473 members of eight regional councils on 1 June, who in turn elected the 150 members of the National People's Assembly on 15 June. At least 50% of registered voters had to cast ballot in an electoral district for the election to be valid. Anyone aged at least 18 and with Guinea-Bissau citizenship was entitled to vote, unless they had been disqualified, whilst candidates had to be at least 21 years old.

== Results ==
Party	Votes	%	Seats
African Party for the Independence of Guinea and Cape Verde	214,201	95.80	150
Against	9,390	4.20	–
Total	223,591	100.00	150
Registered voters/turnout	420,285	–	
Source: Nohlen et al.
