= Rafael Paula Barbosa =

Bissau-Guinean political activist

Rafael Paula Barbosa (17 March 1927 – 2 January 2007) was a political activist in Portuguese Guinea, now known as Guinea-Bissau.

He was born on 17 March 1927 in Safim, near Bissau, to a Guinean mother and Cape Verdean father.

He worked as a civil construction engineer in Portuguese Guinea and became heavily involved with the formation of the African Party for the Independence of Guinea and Cape Verde (Portuguese:Partido Africano da Independencia da Guine e Cabo Verde, PAIGC) in the period leading up to the armed struggle for independence. He recruited other people as members of the party who were then sent to Senegal or the Republic of Guinea for training. During the war of independence during the 1960s he was briefly arrested by the Portuguese Secret Police. After acting as the PAIGC's first President whilst its leader Amílcar Cabral was Secretary-General, Barbosa ended his association with the party after Cabral's assassination in 1973, in which Barbosa was suspected of being complicit.

He was arrested again after independence and sentenced to death, but the sentence was commuted to life imprisonment by the first President, Luís Cabral. He was later temporarily freed by "Nino" Vieira following Vieira's coup d'état on 14 November 1981. Not until the democratisation of Guinea-Bissau in the 1990s was he finally released.

He then went on to found his own political party, the Social Democratic Front (Portuguese: Frente Democratica Social, FDS), of which former President Kumba Ialá was once a member.

He died in a Dakar hospital in Senegal following intensive medical treatment. His daughter Helena Paula Barbosa became a Government Minister.
