= Operation Trident (1964) =

Battle of the Guinea-Bissau War of Independence

- Part of Portuguese Colonial War and Guinea-Bissau War of Independence
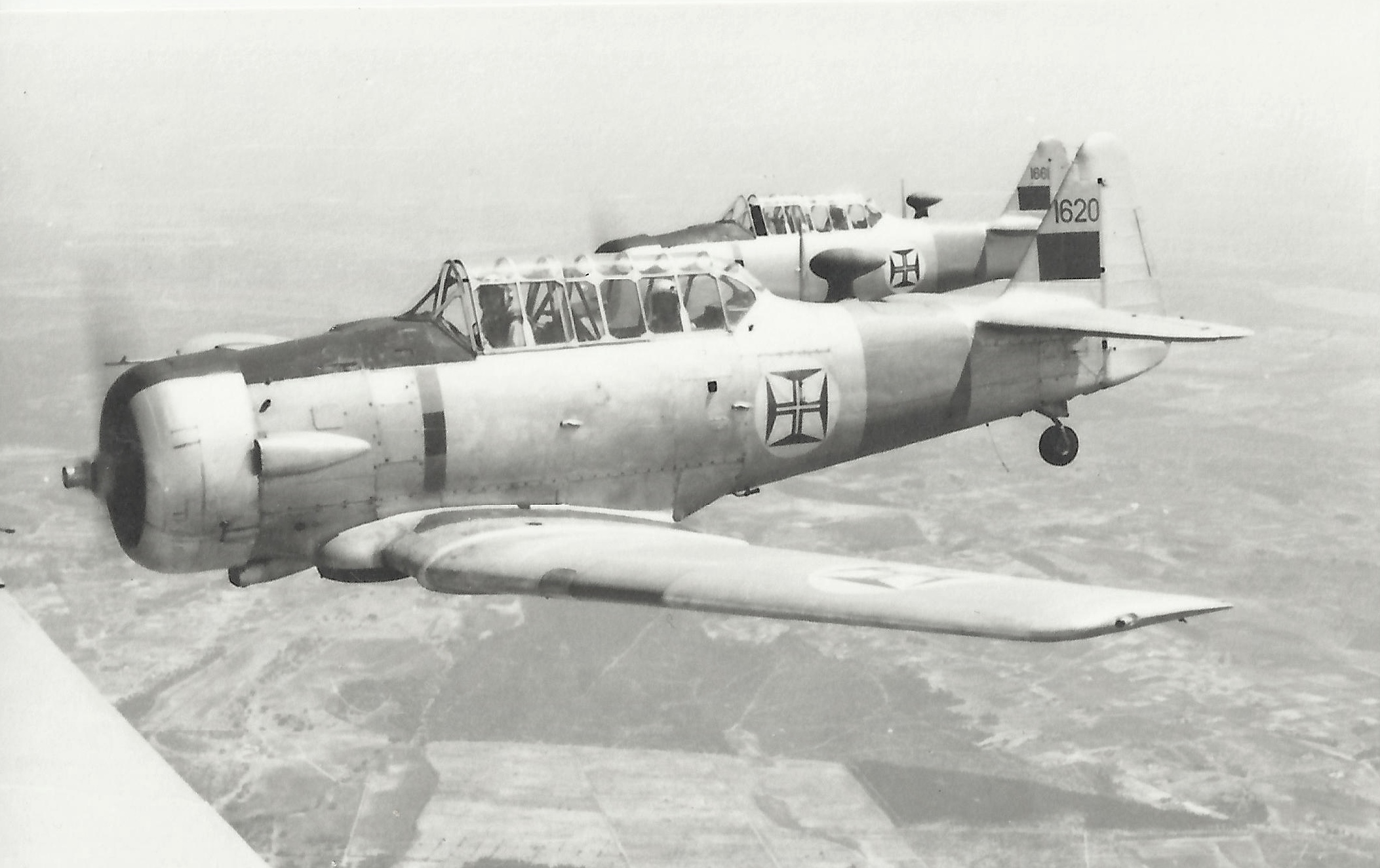
- Two Portuguese Air Force T-6 trainers.
Date	15 January – 24 March 1964
Location	Portuguese Guinea
Result	Portuguese victory
Territorial changes	PAIGC presence mostly removed from the region

Belligerents
Portugal	(Guinea-Bissau) PAIGC

Commanders and leaders
(Portugal) Louro de Sousa	(Guinea-Bissau) Amílcar Cabral

Units involved
(Portugal) Forças Armadas; Portuguese Army; Portuguese Navy; Portuguese Air Force	Unknown

Strength
760 soldiers; 1 destroyer (NRP Vouga); 1 frigate (NRP Nuno Tristão); 7 patrol boats; 8 landing craft; 1 Alouette II; 2+ F-86 Sabres; 5+ T-6 Harvards; 3+ Dornier Do 27s; 1+ Lockheed P-2 Neptune; 1 C-47 skytrain; PAIGC claim: 3,000 soldiers	300–400 guerrillas

Casualties and losses
9 killed; 47 wounded; 193 evacuated (due to illness); 1 T-6 shot-down; 4 T-6 damaged; 1 C-47 damaged; PAIGC claim: 900 killed	40+ killed

Operation Trident (Portuguese: Operação Tridente) was a combined military operation of the Portuguese Army, Navy and Air Force during the Portuguese Colonial War in Guinea in January 1964.

== The Portuguese plan ==
The operation's goal was to eliminate the PAIGC guerrilla and occupy the Como archipelago which, since 1963, had been occupied by the PAIGC.

The operation has been divided into three phases:

1. The first phase started on 15 January and consisted of the disembarkation of the army groups, with air and artillery support, from Catió.
2. In the second phase, the Portuguese forces patrolled the islands from 17 to 24 January.
3. The third phase, from 24 January to 24 March, was the period where most of the fighting took place.

== Operation ==
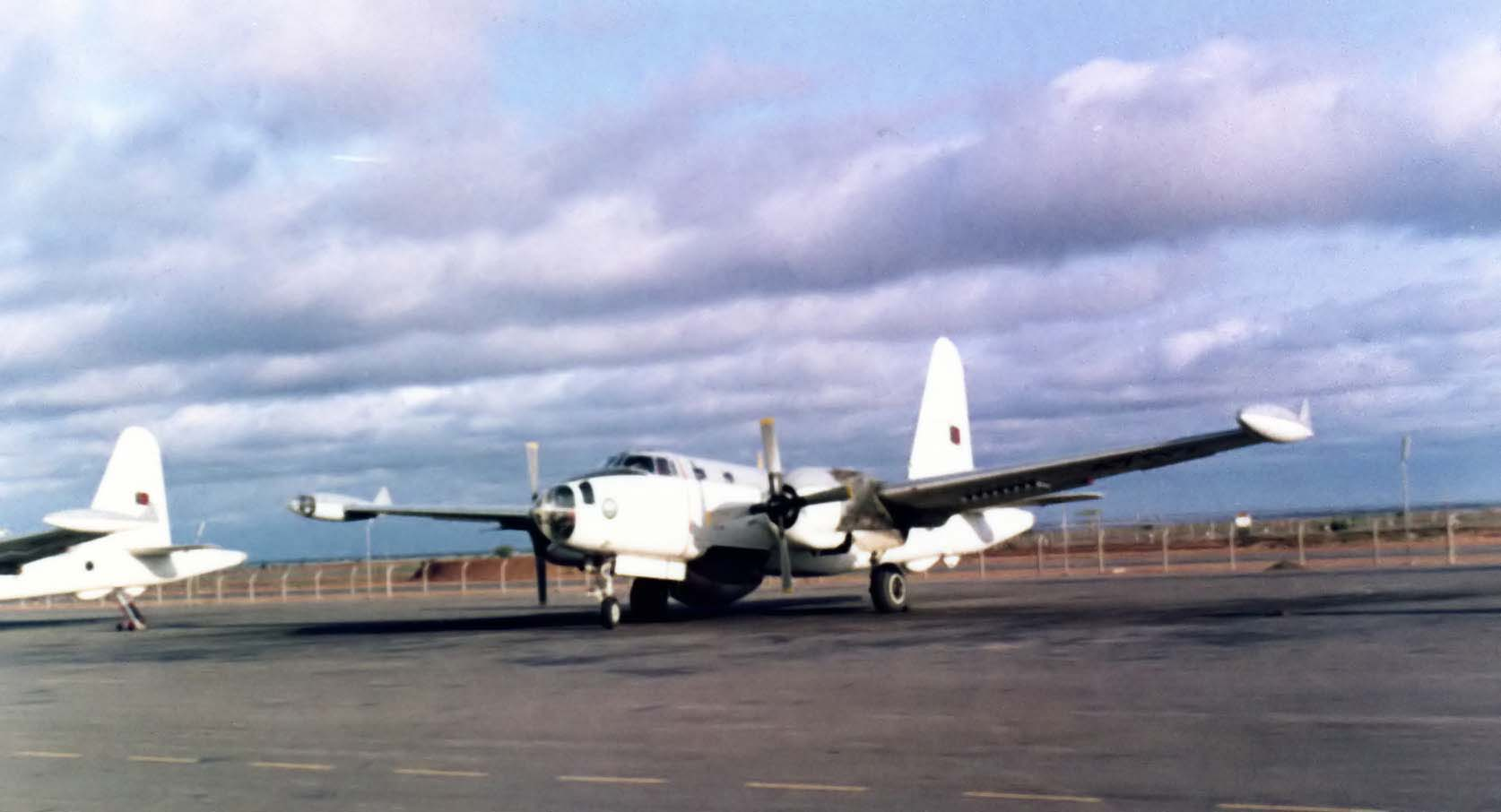
A Portuguese air force Lockheed P-2 Neptune, 1970s

Operation Trident was launched towards the end of 1963, with the aim of eliminating the guerrilla presence in the southern Como archipelago, where it had been installed. Formed by the islands of Como, Caiar and Catunco, the archipelago was considered by the guerrillas as the first liberated region of Guiné, having the guerrillas founded in the Como, called Independent Republic of the Como, in a clear challenge to the Portuguese authorities. Therefore, the Portuguese military action was mainly aimed at dislodging the guerrilla from the three islands, in order to guarantee Portuguese sovereignty again.

At the level of the general strategy of the conflict, the implementation of this broad military action was completely mismatch from the military point of view and, above all, from the political point of view. In military terms, conventional war operations are not applicable to subversive and irregular warfare, mainly because guerrilla forces do not act as a conventional army, as evidenced in several manuals on the subject, including Portuguese ones, including works written before of the beginning of the armed conflict in Guineas, like Revolutionary War, of Hermes de Araújo Oliveira, published in 1962. In addition, the guerrillas had the support of the population and the terrain was favourable to the guerrilla with several forest areas very closed, surrounded by marshy lands with accesses easy to control by the guerrillas. In this way, the approach to the woods was done in a very exposed way, controlling the guerrillas the accesses, which made it very difficult for the Portuguese troops to penetrate the forest. These factors obviously hindered a large-scale conventional operation, with no guarantee of effective victory over the guerrillas.

The Directive establishing and organising the operation was issued on 23 December 1963 by the Commander-in-Chief of Guinea. According to the Portuguese information, the PAIGC guerrilla group had been established since the beginning of this year in the islands of Caiar, Como and Catunco, which constituted the most important guerrilla base, from which it was difficult to navigate to the southernmost part of the territory, at the same time that it constituted as a fundamental point of support for the replenishments, even because it was an important region in the production of rice and the cattle raising. Portuguese military leaders believed that the PAIGC had some of its chiefs on the islands, as well as deposits of military equipment, air-raid shelters and a large number of automatic weapons, assumptions that proved to be wrong during the Operation 10.

Louro de Sousa was reportedly seeking to carry out an operation "in force on the three islands", divided into three phases: firstly, by landings on those islands, with the aim of eliminating the presence of guerrilla groups and occupy their positions in the region; in the second phase the main objective was to prevent the guerrillas from fleeing abroad from the small theatre of operations installed on those three islands; finally, in the third phase, the purpose was to occupy the island of Como and psychologically recover the population that until then covered the PAIGC.

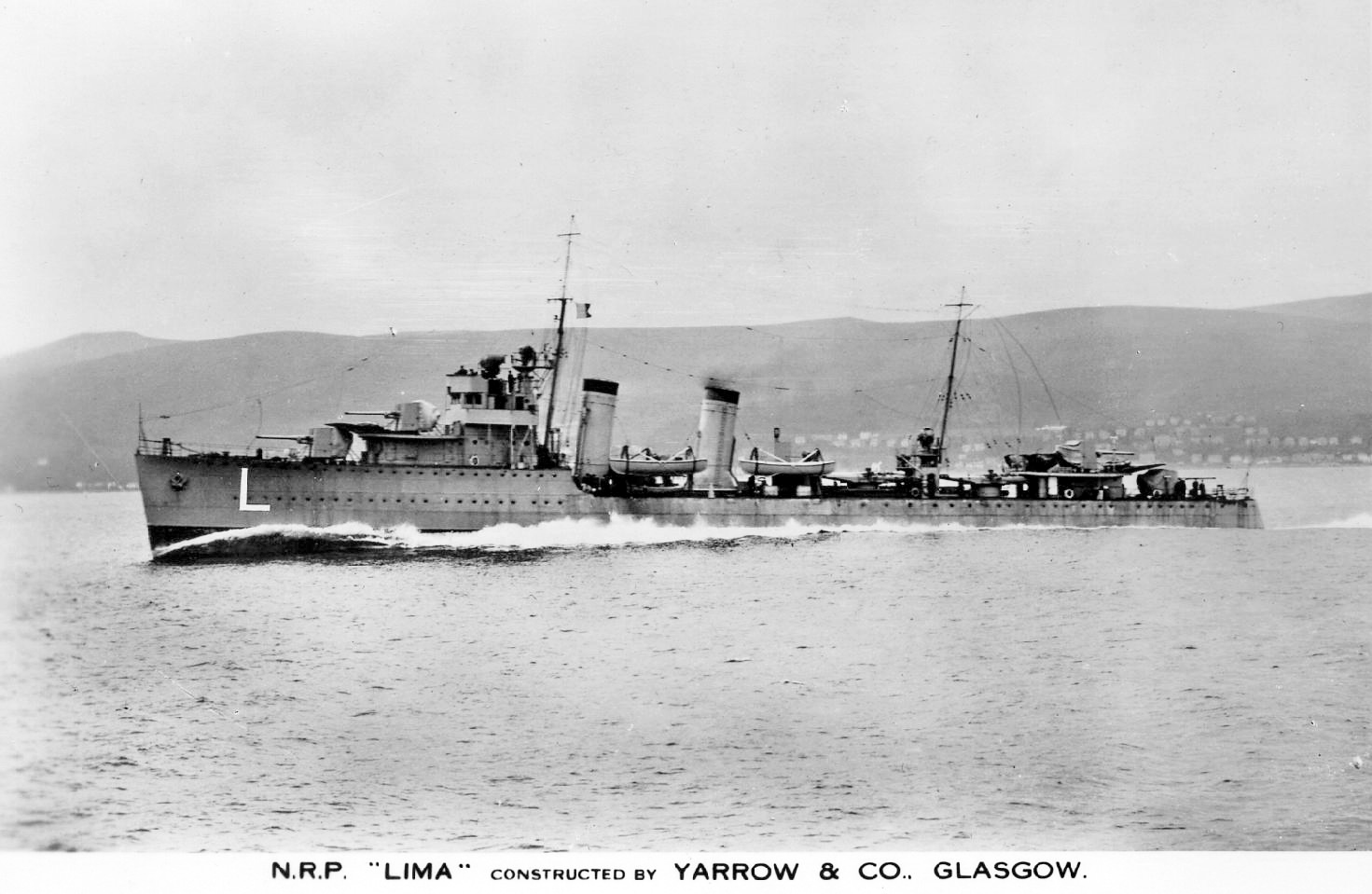
A Douro-class destroyer

The operation involved all of the different branches of the Armed Forces, with the Army having the largest share of the shares, with the Air Force and Navy having the task of supporting the forces on the ground, both logistic and fire support, in the case of the means aerial We will be analysing the ground troops, which also involved special detachments of special Marines that would be under the command of the ground forces after the landings.

As planned by the Commander-in-Chief, three cavalry companies, one of hunters and three detachments of special marines, would participate in the field. The objectives outlined for these units were, landing with the help of the special Marines and occupation of the islands, seeking to recover the populations later, controlling the resources used by the guerrillas, and finally creating conditions for the establishment of authority administrative.

=== The Portuguese landings ===
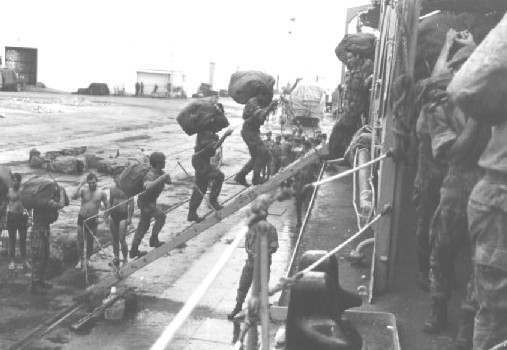
Portuguese troops board NRP Nuno Tristão frigate in Portuguese Guinea, during amphibious Operation Trident (Operação Tridente), 1964

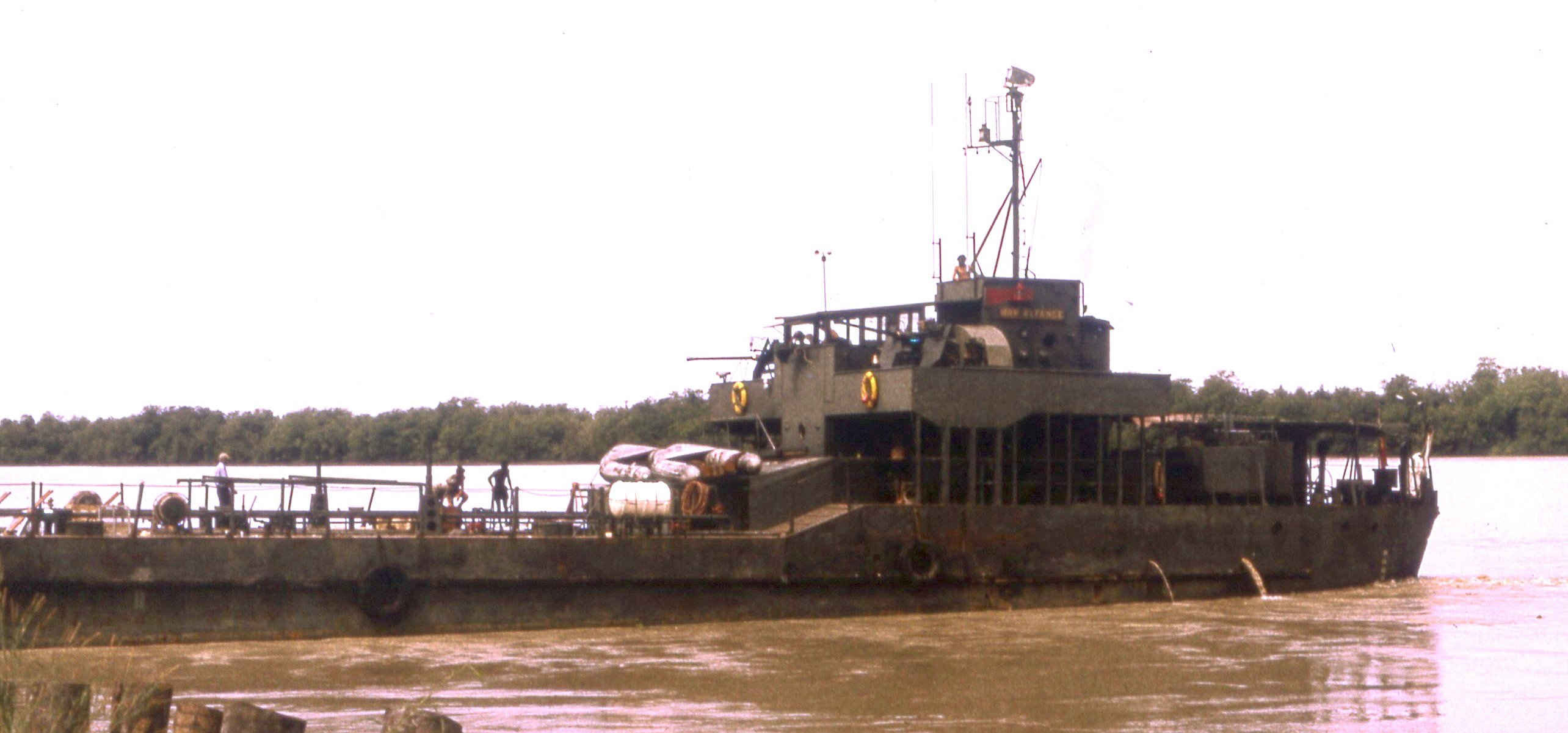
A Portuguese landing craft in Portuguese Guinea, 1973.

After an initial intervention by the Portuguese Air Force, the Portuguese forces landed without meeting any kind of serious resistance in five places of the archipelago, between 15 and 17 of January. The first two intervention groups disembarked on the 15th. Group A disembarked in Caiar, in the south of the island, and then advanced to the tabanca with the same name. They arrived at the tabanca the next day, after a painful march, but they found that the village had been abandoned. Group B landed in the southern part of the island of Como, and advanced to Cauane, where the soldiers encountered resistance. After the fighting, the guerrillas took refuge in the woods, but they were then dislodged from their position by the marines of Detachment 8. Over the next two days the other three Portuguese groups landed without encountering resistance, thereby completing the siege of the guerrillas. The fighting, however, was intensifying in the Cauane area and conditions on the ground were become increasingly adverse for Portuguese forces. The Portuguese also face other problems that logistics were not prepared for. Due to the lack of fresh water on the island, Portuguese troops were forced to dig wells only to obtain poor quality brackish water, and the soldiers also suffered from having poor food and from having to operate in the intense heat under the African Sun.

Almost halfway through the operation, on 9 February, the Operation Trident Command presented a situation analysis. This analysed the reaction of the guerrillas to the activity of the Portuguese forces, which led to the presentation of new plans. The guerrillas were characterised as numerous, well armed and educated, with a good command of the terrain, in such a way as to ensure their protection and to achieve rapid displacements that allow them to reinforce their positions when they were attacked by the Portuguese. This also allowed the guerrillas to isolate and besiege of small nuclei of Portuguese forces that had landed. Thus, in the beginning of the operation the guerrillas were to an extent able defend their positions, but they also took the initiative and launched some offensive actions against the Portuguese.

On 10 March the Special Marines Detachment and the Third Combat Group of Cavalry Company 488 made a surprise landing, striking in the areas of Cumule, Caiar, Tabanca Velha and Camuntudu, imprisoning or eliminating any elements of the guerrilla detected. However, the results obtained were much lower than expected, in addition to the apprehension of school books, passbooks and two canghangs in poor condition, of which the highlight was the destruction of about fifty tons of rice and the slaughter of cattle. Harming the supplies of the guerrillas, had a serious psychological effect on the way that the locals viewed the guerrillas in their fight against the Portuguese forces. Thereby reducing the possibility of them siding with and aiding the Portuguese forces, which was vital if the Portuguese wanted to win the war.

On 17 March, the Special Marines Detachment 7 carried out another action in the Cametonco area, because there were indications that some elements of the PAIGC, who had fled from the island of Como, were continued to collaborate with the guerrilla forces. According to these data, it was decided to carry out an operation which consisted, in the same way as the previous one, of a surprise landing with the purpose of imprisoning or eliminating the enemy elements found, by means of a siege and strike in said tabanca, where the Special Marines Detachment 7, a Parachute Squad, a Special Marines Detachment Section 2, and a fula guide should stay overnight, "to destroy anything that could provide shelter or supplies to the enemy and which can not be recovered." The mission was completed around 10 o'clock on the morning of the 18th, but the results obtained can not be considered relevant since, in addition to eliminating an element that tried to escape, only small material was captured: six cartridges of 7.9 mm; two 9 mm shells; three projectiles of 20 mm; three catanas; in addition to the slaughter of about 150 cattle and 300 other livestock animals. The destruction of local people's livelihoods, which are largely in the hands of the guerrilla forces, may mean that the hope of regaining these populations would be diminished or assumed to be out of the question by Portuguese forces, thereby attempting to minimise their support for PAIGC.

== Aftermath ==
=== Operational failings and mistakes ===
One of the main shortcomings of the operation was the lack of sufficiently credible information on the presence of PAIGC in the region. It was assumed that the guerrillas were in an unfavourable psychological situation and, despite assuming insufficient information about the guerrilla's defensive capacity, the Commander-in-Chief, General Louro de Sousa, believed that it should not to oppose the landing and occupation of the islands. On the other hand, there would be too much confidence in the technical and military superiority of the Portuguese Armed Forces. Although the number of guerrillas on the islands was unknown, ground troops had the support of the navy and the air force. These were two advantages that the guerrillas did not have. For the operation the Portuguese Air Force used in addition to helicopters, F-86 Sabre fighters, T-6 Texan light-attack aircraft, Lockheed P-2 Neptune maritime patrol planes, and transport planes.

During the operation, one plane was shot down and six others hit (5 T-6 and 1 C-47). The plane in question was a T-6 piloted by Alferes João Santos Pite, and was killed in late January in the Cauane area, while participating with another T-6, piloted by Captain Gomes do Amaral. Everything indicates that Pité was directly hit by ground fire, and quickly lost control of the plane.

The Portuguese Armed Forces were not yet fully prepared for counterinsurgency warfare, which led the high command to try to fight the war using conventional tactics and methods. The operation was motivated by political reasons rather than military reasons. The guerrillas declaring the archipelago liberated zone of Portuguese colonial power, a situation that was intolerable for the Portuguese authorities. However, Louro de Sousa was, by that time, in a very weak position in relation to political power in Lisbon. A few months earlier, the Commander-in-Chief of Guinea had told the Undersecretary of State for the Overseas Administration, Silva Cunha, the opinion that the war in Guinea was lost, which had made a very bad impression on some members of the Government. Therefore, Operation Trident also served as a demonstration of military initiative on the part of Louro de Sousa.

=== Consequences ===
Despite the planning and effort developed, the truth is that Portuguese forces had not been able to completely eradicate the guerrillas in Como, although they had significantly limited their ability to operate in the area. Despite the enormous difficulties they faced in confronting Portuguese forces, the guerrillas were able to resist, not abandoning the island and the same can be said of the population. Shortly after the end of the operation, the island was visited by a delegation of the party leadership headed by Luís Cabral, who traveled the island to know how the battle had run and what needs the inhabitants and the guerrillas had.

The result of the operation would be used extensively by the PAIGC in its internal and external propaganda. This can see this in an interview that Amílcar Cabral gives in 1969 to Tricontinental magazine in Conakry, where he comments on the battle as a great victory for his movement. Cabral says that the Portuguese troops numbered around 3,000 men and that they had lost 900 soldiers and a large quantity of material, whilst being forced to withdraw and that As was still a liberated area dominated by the PAIGC. In fact, the Portuguese forces suffered 9 killed and 47 wounded and 193 soldiers were evacuated to the hospital of Bissau due to disease reasons.

However, the main consequence of this operation was the strategic change that was carried out in the political and military leadership of the territory, with the dismissal of Louro de Sousa and Vasco Rodrigues, Commander-in-Chief and Governor, respectively, single person, as had already happened in the time of Peixoto Correia. Arnaldo Schultz was the military man chosen for these functions, having arrived in Bissau on 20 May 1964, about two months after the end of Operation Trident.
