= Francisca Pereira =

Bissau-Guinean nurse, activist, and politician

Francisca Lucas Pereira Gomes
- Born: 1942 (age 83–84); Bolama, Portuguese Guinea
- Citizenship: Bissau-Guinean
- Occupations: Nurse, Independence activist, Politician
- Known for: Member of PAIGC during independence struggle; Mayor of Bolama; Minister for Women's Affairs (1990–1994); Deputy President of the National Assembly (1994–1997); Minister of the Interior (1997–1999); Minister of State for Political Affairs and Diplomacy (2002)

Francisca Lucas Pereira Gomes (born 1942), normally known as Francisca Pereira, is a former Bissau-Guinean nurse, independence activist and current politician.

She was born in Bolama, the former capital of the Portuguese colony of Portuguese Guinea.

As a young woman she joined the Guinea-Bissau Liberation Movement (Movimento para Independência Nacional da Guiné Portuguesa) (later the PAIGC) in 1959/60. She first worked in the Secretariat of the PAIGC in Conakry, being sent in 1965 to Kiev in the former USSR to receive training as a nurse. From 1967, she was deputy director of the Escola Piloto in Conakry, a training centre for Guinea-Bissauan child soldiers and war refugees.

During the years of revolution she worked as a nurse in PAIGC-occupied areas in Guinea and then at the PAIGC hospital at Ziguinchor in Senegal. Between 1970 and 1975 she represented the women's corps at several PAIGC conferences.

Since independence, Pereira held various offices in the Guinea-Bissau state. She was the Mayor of her home town of Bolama and chairman of the Guinea-Bissau Women's Union (União Democrática the Mulheres da Guiné-Bissau). After the democratization of Guinea-Bissau and the introduction of the multi-party system, Pereira held positions such as Minister for Women's Affairs (from 1990 to 1994), the first Deputy President of the National Assembly (from 1994 to 1997) and Minister of the Interior (from 1997 to 1999).

In 2002 she was appointed Minister of State for political affairs and diplomacy.
