= Amílcar Cabral =

Bissau-Guinean and Cape Verdean politician (1924–1973)

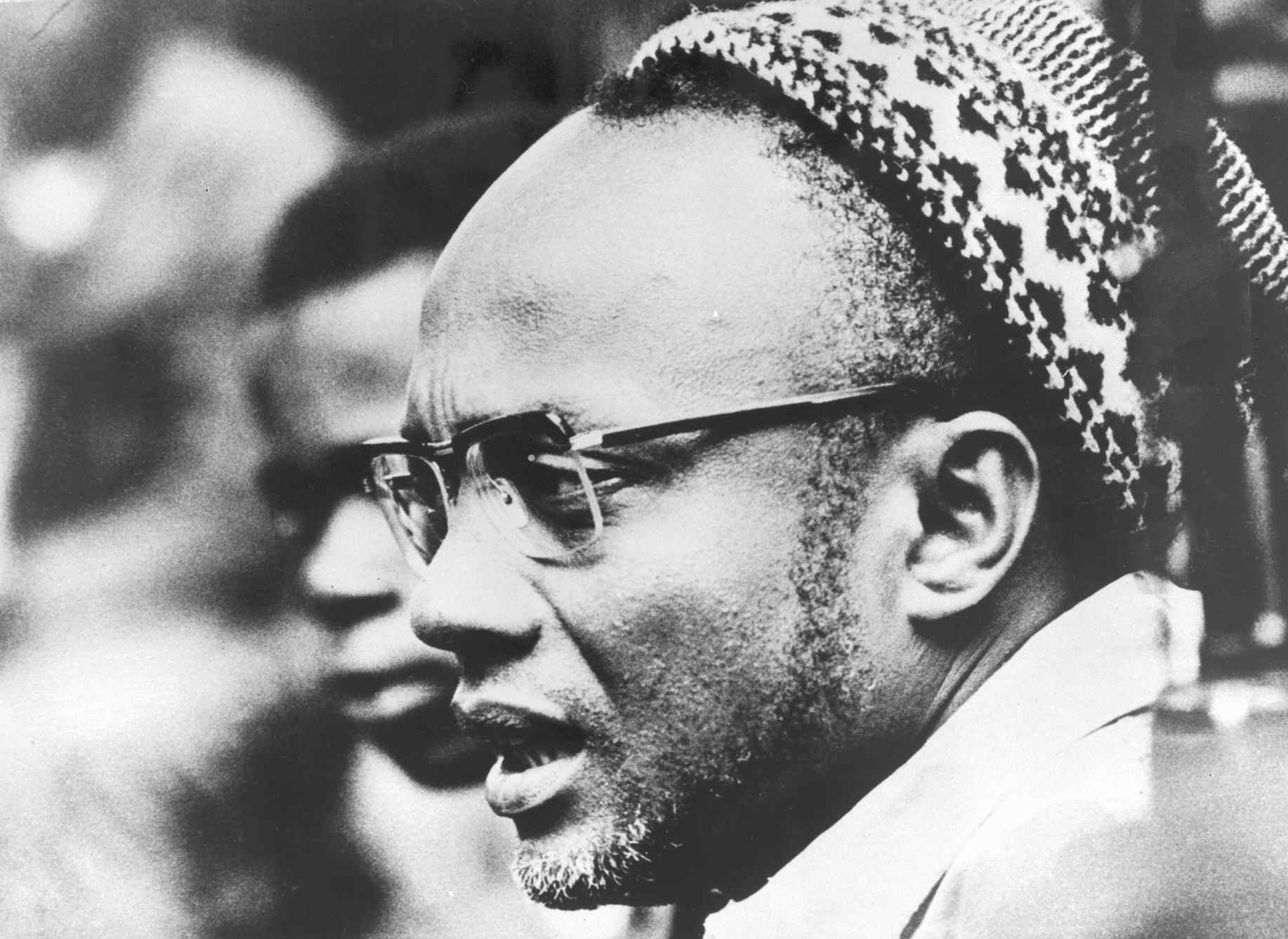
- Cabral in the 1964 Cassacá Congress, a gathering of PAIGC soldiers.

De facto leader of the Liberated Zones
- In office c. 23 January 1963 – 20 January 1973
- Preceded by: Office established
- Succeeded by: Triumvirate

Personal details
- Born: Amílcar Lopes Cabral; 12 September 1924 Bafatá, Portuguese Guinea
- Died: 20 January 1973 (aged 48) Conakry, Guinea
- Cause of death: Assassination by gunshot
- Resting place: Amílcar Cabral's Mausoleum
- Party: African Party for the Independence of Guinea and Cape Verde; People's Movement for the Liberation of Angola; All-African People's Revolutionary Party

Amílcar Lopes Cabral (Portuguese: [ɐˈmilkaɾ ˈlɔpɨʃ kɐˈbɾal]; 12 September 1924 – 20 January 1973) was a Bissau-Guinean and Cape Verdean agricultural engineer, political organizer, diplomat, and half-brother of Luís Cabral. He was widely remembered as one of Africa's foremost anti-colonial leaders. He was also a pan-Africanist and intellectual nationalist revolutionary poet.

Also known by the nom de guerre Abel Djassi, he led the nationalist movement of Guinea-Bissau and the Cape Verde Islands and the ensuing war of independence in Guinea-Bissau.

Cabral was shot dead on 20 January 1973, about eight months before Guinea-Bissau's unilateral declaration of independence. He was deeply influenced by Marxism, becoming an inspiration to revolutionary socialists and national independence movements worldwide.

== Early life and education ==
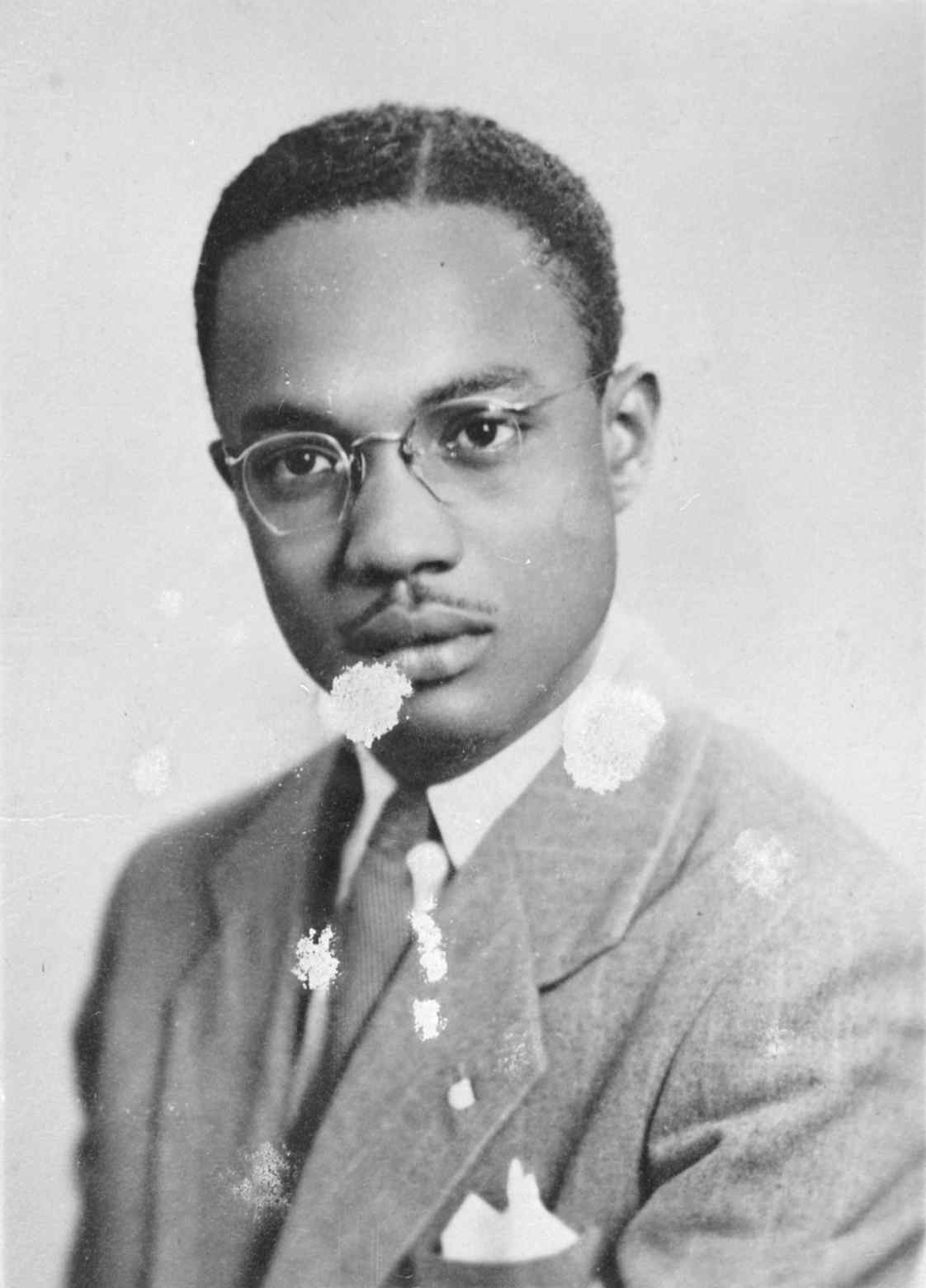
Portrait of Amilcar Cabral in 1948, aged 23.

Amílcar Lopes Cabral was born on 12 September 1924. He was born in the town of Bafatá, Portuguese Guinea (located in modern-day Guinea-Bissau) to Cape Verdean parents, Juvenal António Lopes da Costa Cabral and Iva Pinhel Évora, both hailing from Santiago. His father came from a wealthy land-owning family. His mother was a shop owner and hotel worker who worked hard to support her family, especially after she separated from Amílcar's father by 1929. Her family was not well off, and sources conflict as to whether she only completed primary education, or had no education at all.

Amílcar Cabral was educated at Liceu Secondary School Gil Eanes in the town of Mindelo, Cape Verde. He was later educated at the Instituto Superior de Agronomia in Lisbon, Portugal. While an agronomy student in Lisbon, he founded the Centro do Estudos Africanos (Centre for African Studies). Under the Estado Novo labour unions and associations were banned but sports or cultural organizations were permitted. The Centre used cultural activities, and the presence of non-political members, as cover for dissident political activity. He also took part in student movements dedicated to opposing the ruling dictatorship of Portugal and promoting the cause of independence for the Portuguese colonies in Africa.

== Career ==
While back in Africa, starting in 1953, he conducted an agricultural census in Portuguese Guinea during which he traveled more than 60,000 kilometers. This allowed him to “become intimately familiar with the people and land” of Portuguese Guinea, understanding that undoubtedly was helpful in the guerrilla war he went on to fight. He returned to Africa in the 1950s from Portugal and was instrumental in promoting the independence causes of the then Portuguese colonies. In 1956, he was the founder of the PAIGC or Partido Africano da Independência da Guiné e Cabo Verde (African Party for the Independence of Guinea and Cape Verde). He was also one of the founding members of Movimento Popular Libertação de Angola (MPLA) later in the same year, together with Agostinho Neto, whom he met in Portugal, and other Angolan nationalists. Cabral was an asset of the Czechoslovak State Security (StB), and under the codename "Secretary" provided intelligence information to the StB.

=== Guerrilla war for independence ===
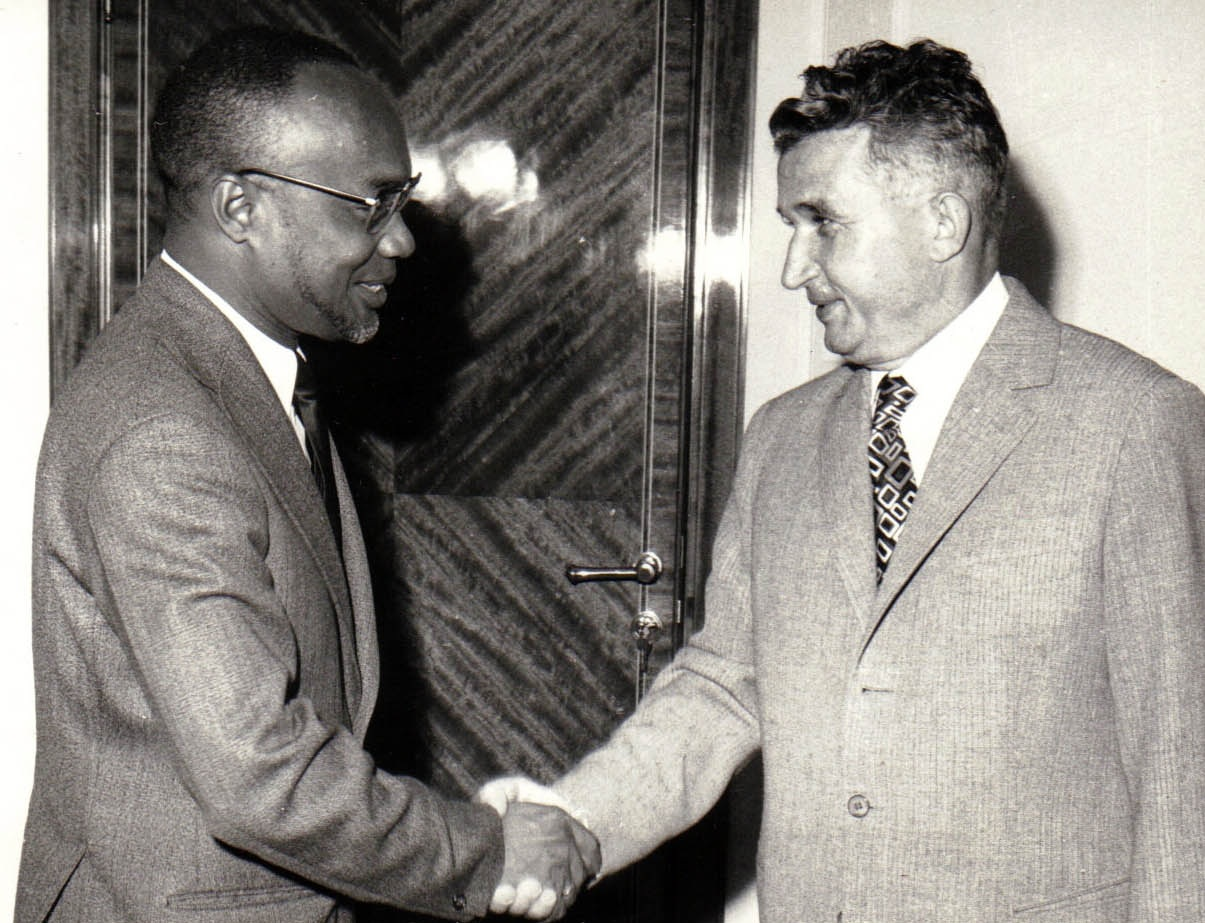
Amílcar Cabral with Nicolae Ceaușescu.

From 1963 to his assassination in 1973, Cabral led the PAIGC's guerrilla movement in Portuguese Guinea against the Portuguese government, which evolved into one of the most successful wars of independence in modern African history. The goal of the conflict was to attain independence for both Portuguese Guinea and Cape Verde. Over the course of the conflict, as the movement captured territory from the Portuguese, Cabral became the de facto leader of a large portion of what became Guinea-Bissau.

In preparation for the independence war, Cabral set up training camps in Ghana with the permission of Kwame Nkrumah. Cabral trained his lieutenants through various techniques, including mock conversations to provide them with effective communication skills to aid their efforts in mobilizing Guinean traditional leaders to support the PAIGC. Cabral realized that the war effort could only be sustained if his troops could be fed and taught to live off the land, alongside the larger populace. Being an agronomist, he trained his troops to teach local farmers better farming techniques. This was to ensure that they could increase productivity and be able to feed their own family and community, as well as the soldiers enlisted in the PAIGC's military wing. When not fighting, PAIGC soldiers tilled and ploughed the fields alongside the local population.

Cabral and the PAIGC also set up a trade-and-barter bazaar system that moved around the country and made staple goods available to the countryside at prices lower than that of colonial store owners. During the war, Cabral also set up a roving hospital and triage station to give medical care to wounded PAIGC soldiers and quality-of-life care to the larger populace, relying on medical supplies garnered from the USSR and Sweden. The bazaars and triage stations were at first stationary, until they came under frequent attack from Portuguese regime forces. In the liberated territories education was taken as extremely important, and the Brazilian pedagogue Paulo Freire was significantly influenced by this.

== Assassination ==
In 1972, Cabral began to form a People's Assembly in preparation for the independence of Guinea-Bissau. On January 20, 1973 after leaving the reception at the Polish embassy in Conakry he was going to his home with his wife, Maria Helena Rodriguez. At a roadblock en route to his house Cabral got out of his car and appeared to recognize the individuals at the roadblock. Disgruntled former PAIGC rival Inocêncio Kani, together with another member of PAIGC, shot Cabral with a machine-gun and tore a hole in his gut.

== Aftermath ==
According to some theories, Portuguese PIDE agents, whose alleged plan eventually went awry, wanted to influence Cabral's rivals through agents operating within the PAIGC, in hope of arresting Cabral and placing him under the custody of Portuguese authorities. Another theory claims that Ahmed Sékou Touré, jealous of Cabral's greater international prestige, among other motives, orchestrated the conspiracy; both theories remain unproven and controversial.

After the assassination, about one hundred officers and guerrilla soldiers of the PAIGC, accused of involvement in the conspiracy that resulted in the murder of Amílcar Cabral and the attempt to seize power in the movement, were summarily executed. His half-brother, Luís Cabral, became the leader of the Guinea-Bissau branch of the party and eventually became President of Guinea-Bissau.

Less than a month after the assassination, the United States concluded that then-colonial power Portugal was not directly involved in his death, according to official documents made public in 2006. Even so, the US State Department's Information and Investigation Services also concluded that "Lisbon's complicity" in the assassination of the leader of the struggle for Cape Verde's and Guinea-Bissau's independence "cannot be ruled out."

Later on 25 April 1974, the Carnation Revolution coup was carried out in Portugal, which was followed by a cease-fire in the various battle fronts and eventually by the independence of all of Portugal's former colonies in Africa. Cabral was assassinated prior to the independence of the Portuguese colonies in Africa and therefore died before he could see his homelands of Cape Verde and Guinea Bissau gain independence from Portugal.

== Thought ==
=== Colonial Class Structure and Class Suicide ===
The core of Cabral’s theoretical contributions lies in his positioning of the peasantry and the petty bourgeoisie in revolutionary organizing. Cabral wrote extensively about the role of peasants, arguing that, in colonial contexts like Portuguese Guinea, the peasantry constituted a significant physical force, yet the Cabral famously distinguished between a class's sheer structural presence, its physical force, and its active political consciousness, its revolutionary force. In arguing this, Cabral distinguishes his evaluation of class struggle from Maoism, citing the lack of a history of revolt in Guinea compared to the Chinese context; he argues that, unlike in the Chinese context, the peasantry cannot act as the primary revolutionary vanguard.

“A distinction must be drawn between a physical force and a revolutionary force; physically, the peasantry is a great force in Guinea: it is almost the whole of the population, it controls the nation's wealth, it is the peasantry which produces; but we know from experience what trouble we had convincing the peasantry to fight…The conditions of the peasantry in China were very different: the peasantry had a history of revolt, but this was not the case in Guinea, and so it was not possible for our party militants and propaganda workers to find the same kind of welcome among the peasantry in Guinea for the idea of national liberation as the idea found in China.” — Amílcar Cabral, "Brief Analysis of the Social Structure in Guinea"

In his diagnosis of Guinea's social structure, Cabral argues that imperialism intentionally blocked the development of a native, economically viable industrial bourgeoisie or a significant urban proletariat. Thus, he inverts standard Marxist class categories, arguing that the only group equipped with the literacy, administrative experience, and structural access necessary to manipulate or seize the state apparatus is the petty bourgeoisie. He argues that under colonial conditions, the petty bourgeoisie is the inevitable inheritor of state power; however, he describes it as a service class rooted in the state rather than in the process of production. This lack of economic grounding creates a historical dilemma upon the departure of the colonizer, where the petty bourgeoisie can either ally itself with imperialism and the reactionary strata in its own country to try and preserve itself as a petty bourgeoisie or ally itself with the workers and peasants, who must themselves take power or control to make the revolution. To achieve the latter, Cabral demanded a radical psychological and structural sacrifice, introducing the concept of class suicide.

“In order not to betray these objectives the petty bourgeoisie has only one choice: to strengthen its revolutionary consciousness, to reject the temptations of becoming more bourgeois and the natural concerns of its class mentality, to identify itself with the working classes and not to oppose the normal development of the process of revolution. This means that in order to truly fulfill the role in the national liberation struggle, the revolutionary petty bourgeoisie must be capable of committing suicide as a class in order to be reborn as revolutionary workers, completely identified with the deepest aspirations of the people to which they belong.” — Amílcar Cabral, "The Weapon of Theory"

Cabral defines class suicide as the voluntary relinquishment of the elite social, cultural, and economic privileges of the petty bourgeoisie. He argues that, following national liberation, the petty-bourgeois vanguard must consciously dismantle their own class status, dissolve their power back into the peasant and nascent working masses, and ensure that those who produce the wealth ultimately control the instruments of the state to prevent the reproduction of capitalist class structures.

=== Historical Materialism ===
The development of history is a recurring theme in many of Cabral’s works. In “The Weapon of Theory”, Cabral expands the material conception of history in the context of peoples dominated by imperialism. Cabral refuses the idea that peoples existing outside of the class and imperial system are unhistoried, and posit instead that history undergoes at least three stages, motivated by the primary mode of production, comprising “the level of productive forces and the pattern of ownership of the means of production”:

1. Communal agricultural and cattle-raising societies where class and thus class struggle does not yet exist.
2. Feudal or agricultural/agro-industrial bourgeois societies, corresponding to privatization of the means of production, leading to the creation of class and emerging contradictions for class conflict.
3. Socialist or communist societies, requiring a critical mass of productive forces and the deprivatization of the means of production, consequently eliminating the phenomena of class and class struggle.

In “Brief Analysis of the Social Structure in Guinea”, Cabral expands the concept of historical materialism to include the colonial power’s role as the driver of history, and characterizes the primary class struggle in colonial contexts as between that of the colonized and the colonizer.

=== Consciousness ===
Prise de conscience, or awareness, is a crucial factor of national liberation for Cabral. He believed that the petty bourgeoisie can fulfill the role of the vanguard due to their “higher standard of living than that of the masses, more frequent contact with the agents of colonialism, and hence more chances of being humiliated, higher level of education and political awareness, etc” leading to an accelerated awareness of the need for liberation.

=== Role of Women ===
Cabral held that national liberation could not be complete without the emancipation of women, declaring that “our revolution will never be victorious if we do not achieve the full participation of women”. He grounded this position in a broader commitment to both individual and collective autonomy, arguing that true independence required the dismantling of all sociocultural obstacles to human freedom, including those rooted in gender. According to Zed el Nabolsy, Cabral therefore applied the same modernist principles that justified anti-colonial resistance to the question of women’s rights, that just as colonialism negated the autonomy of Guineans and Cape Verdeans, so too did patriarchal customs negate the autonomy of women. The party's directive to cadres reflected this logic, instructing them to respect local customs only insofar as they did not conflict with “human dignity” or the equal rights of men and women.

In practice, Cabral and the PAIGC established a quota system ensuring that at least two of five elected members on village tribunals and councils were women, and by 1972 women had begun joining the party's political organs and people's courts. Cabral also led the founding of the Democratic Union of Women of Guinea and Cape Verde (UDEMU) in 1961 to institutionalize these commitments, though it was dissolved in 1966 as experienced women cadres were redirected to frontline roles. Women went on to serve as fighters, nurses, political commissars, and educators, with women leaders like Carmen Pereira rising to join the 24-member Executive Council of the Struggle as well as later serving as deputy president of the National Assembly.

== Tributes ==
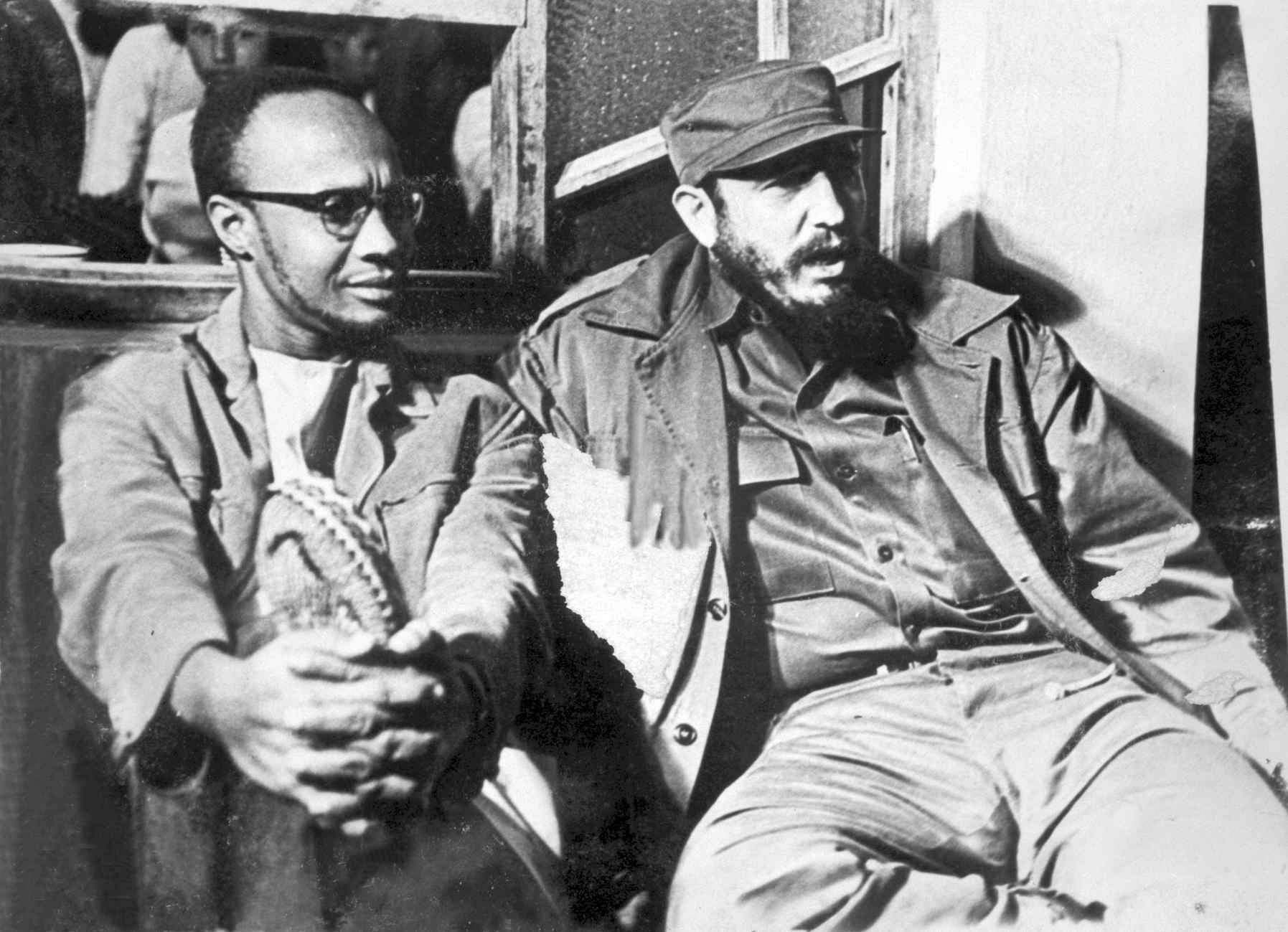
Amílcar Cabral with Fidel Castro in Cuba for the 1966 Tricontinental Conference.

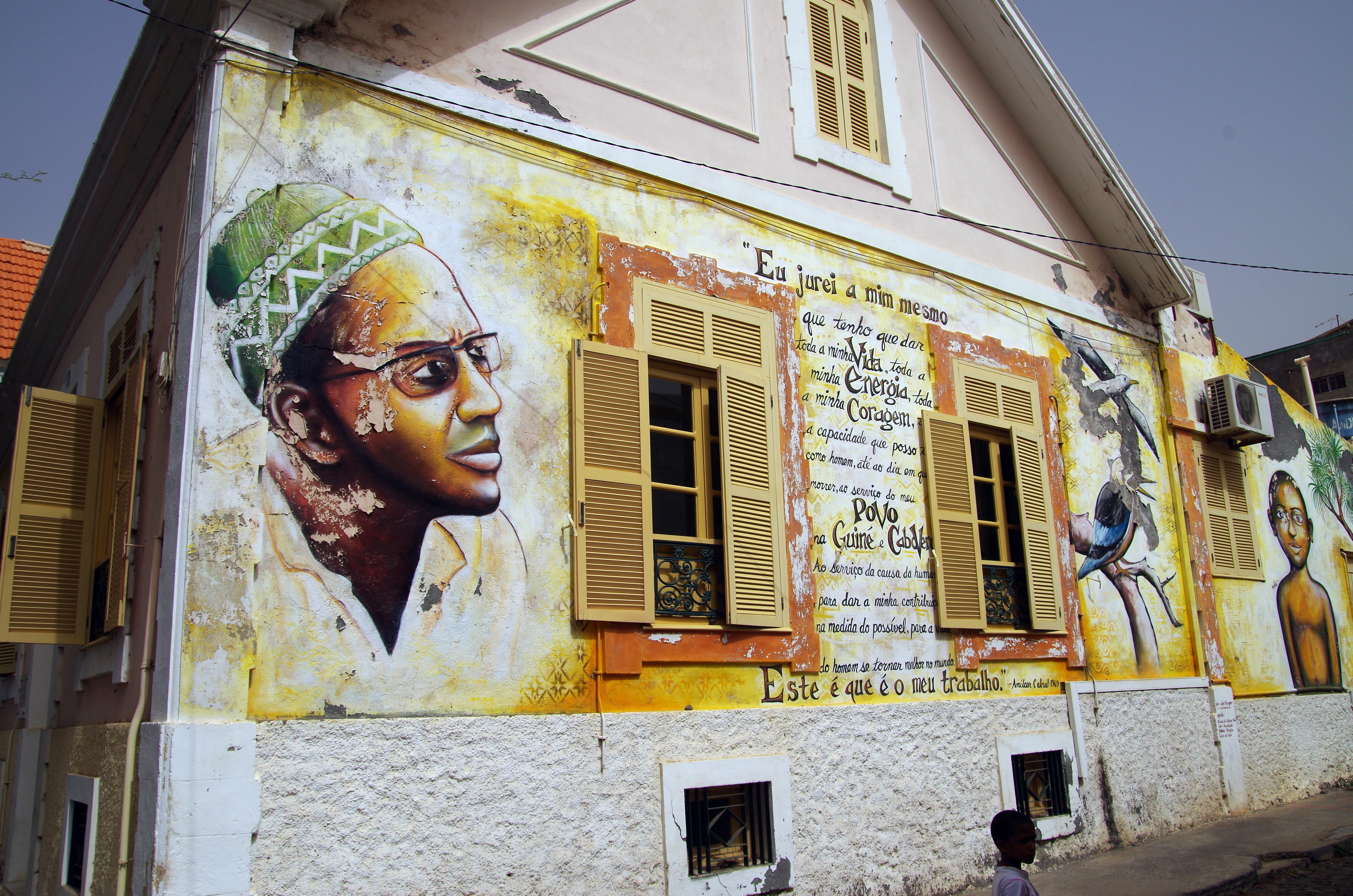
Mural on the wall of the Amílcar Cabral Foundation offices in Praia, Cape Verde.

...one of the most lucid and brilliant leaders in Africa, Comrade Amílcar Cabral, who instilled in us tremendous confidence in the future and the success of his struggle for liberation.

— Fidel Castro, Tricontinental Conference 1966 in Havana, Cuba

Cabral is considered a "revolutionary theoretician as significant as Frantz Fanon and Che Guevara", one "whose influence reverberated far beyond the African continent." Amílcar Cabral International Airport, Cape Verde's principal international airport at Sal, is named in his honor. There is also a football competition, the Amílcar Cabral Cup, in zone 2, named as a tribute to him. In addition, the only privately owned university in Guinea-Bissau – Amílcar Cabral University, in Bissau – is named after him. Jorge Peixinho composed an elegy to Cabral in 1973.

Author António Tomás wrote a biography of Amílcar Cabral, entitled O Fazedor de Utopias: Uma Biografia de Amílcar Cabral, which offers an extensive overview of Amílcar's life in narrative form. It features a detailed account of Amílcar's family history in Portuguese. A large number of photographs were taken of him, and the work of the independence movement in Guinea-Bissau, by the Italian photographer Bruna Polimeni. These have been exhibited in Cape Verde, Portugal and Italy.

Patrick Chabal, professor of Lusophone African studies at King's College, London, also wrote a book about the life and biography of Amílcar Cabral, entitled Amílcar Cabral: Revolutionary Leadership And People's War (1983 and 2003). The book tells the story of Cabral who, as head of PAIGC, Guinea-Bissau's nationalist movement, became one of Africa's foremost revolutionary leaders.

President William R. Tolbert (Republic of Liberia) commissioned and built a housing estate on the Old Road, Sinkor, Monrovia, Liberia, named in honor of Cabral.

There is a block of flats named Amílcar Cabral Court on Porteus Road in west London, situated in the Paddington Green area.

Angolan singer and activist David Zé composed 'Quem Matou Cabral' in honor of Amílcar Cabral and performed it during the independence celebrations of Mozambique, São Tomé and Príncipe, and Guinea-Bissau.

East Germany issued a postage stamp in his honor in 1978.

A square in Veshnyaki District of Moscow was named "Amílcar Cabral Square" (Russian: «Площадь Амилкара Кабрала» "Ploschad Amilcara Cabrala") since 16 January 1974.

He was voted the second greatest leader in the world in a poll conducted by BBC World History Magazine in March 2020.

A public library in Bologna was named "Amílcar Cabral Library" since 1974.

== In popular culture ==
=== Films ===
- Cabral's political thought and role in the liberation of Guinea-Bissau and Cape Verde is discussed at some length in Chris Marker's film Sans Soleil (1983). He is also the subject of the Portuguese documentary Amílcar Cabral, which was released in 2000.
- The documentary film Cabralista, winner of the CVIFF (Cape Verde International Film Festival) prize for best documentary in 2011, puts Amílcar Cabral's political views and ideologies in the spotlight.
- Amílcar is a documentary made by Miguel Eek, released in 2025 at the IDFA (International Documentary Filmfestival Amsterdam). It tells the story of Amílcar Cabral's life based on police rapports, his writings, poems and private letters to give voice to Cabral's journey to becoming a revolutionary leader.

=== Music ===
- The Senegalese band Orchestra Baobab included the song "Cabral", sung in Cape Verdean Creole in their 2007 album Made in Dakar.

== Writings ==
- Cabral, Amilcar. Resistance and Decolonization. Translated by Dan Wood. Rowman & Littlefield International, 2016.
- Cabral, Amilcar. Return to the Source: Selected Speeches of Amilcar Cabral. Monthly Review Press, 1973.
- Cabral, Amilcar. Unity and Struggle: Speeches and Writings of Amilcar Cabral. Monthly Review Press, 1979.
