= Politics of Guinea-Bissau =

The politics of Guinea-Bissau take place in a framework of a semi-presidential representative democratic republic, with a multi-party system, wherein the President is head of state and the Prime Minister is head of government. Executive power is exercised by the government. Legislative power is vested in both the government and the National People's Assembly.

Since 1994, the Bissau-Guinean party system has been dominated by the socialist African Independence Party of Guinea and Cape Verde and the Party for Social Renewal. The judiciary is independent of the executive and the legislature.

Despite the democratic, constitutional framework, the military has exercised substantial power, and has interfered repeatedly in civilian leadership since multi-party elections were instituted in 1994. In the past 16 years, Guinea-Bissau has experienced three coups, a civil war, an attempted coup, and a presidential assassination by the military. Since the country's independence in 1974, only one president successfully completed his five-year term, José Mário Vaz.

== Political developments ==
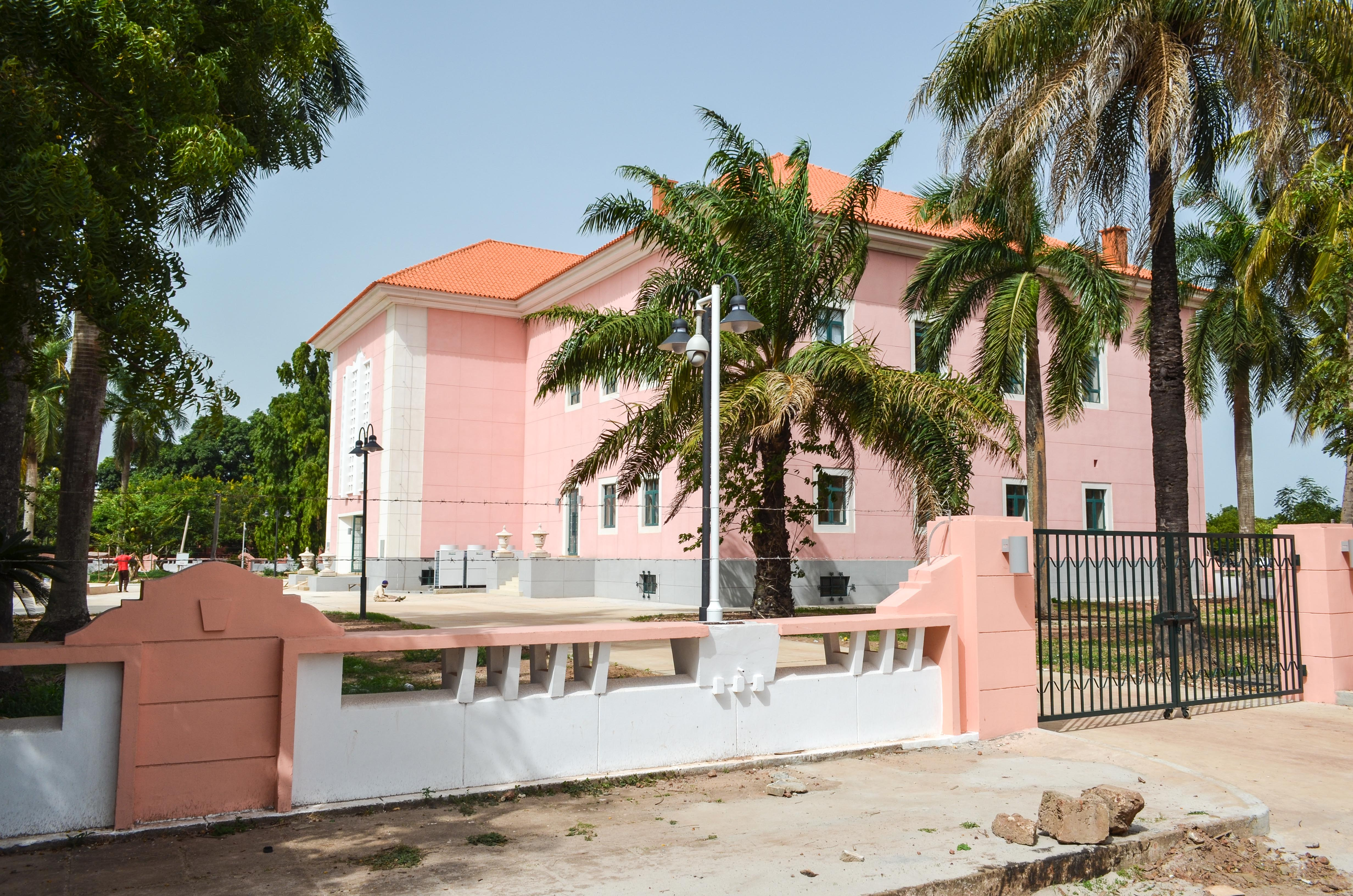
Guinea-Bissau's Presidential Palace in the capital Bissau.

In 1989, the ruling African Independence Party of Guinea and Cape Verde (PAIGC), under the direction of President João Bernardo "Nino" Vieira, began to outline a political liberalization program which the People's National Assembly approved in 1991. Reforms that paved the way for multi-party democracy included the repeal of articles of the constitution, which had enshrined the leading role of the PAIGC. Laws were ratified to allow the formation of other political parties, a free press, and independent trade unions with the right to strike.

Guinea-Bissau's first multi-party elections for president and parliament were held in 1994. Following the 1998-99 civil war, presidential and legislative elections were again held, bringing opposition leader Kumba Ialá and his Party for Social Renewal to power. Ialá was ousted in a bloodless coup in September 2003, and Henrique Rosa was sworn in as president.

Former president Viera was once again elected as president in July 2005. The government of Prime Minister Carlos Gomes Júnior was elected in March 2004 in a free and fair election, but was replaced by the government of Prime Minister Aristides Gomes, which took office in November 2005. Gomes lost a no-confidence vote and submitted his resignation in March 2007.

Martinho Ndafa Kabi was then nominated as prime minister by a coalition composed of the PAIGC, the Social Renewal Party (PRS), and the United Social Democratic Party (PUSD). On April 9, 2007, it was announced that President João Bernardo Vieira had rejected the choice of Kabi, but the coalition said that they maintained him as their choice. Later that day, Vieira appointed Kabi as the new prime minister. Kabi took office on April 13, and his government, composed of 20 ministers (including eight from the PAIGC, eight from the PRS, and two from the PUSD) was named on April 17.

=== 2009 assassination ===
President Viera was killed on March 2, 2009, by soldiers as retaliation for the killing of the head of the joint chiefs of staff, General Tagme Na Waie, who was murdered the previous day.

=== 2010 military unrest ===
Prior to the 2008 election, a decision to change the electoral date and extend the parliamentary mandate resulted in major controversy when Assembly deputies snubbed the president and chose to extend their mandate. After the Supreme Court annulled that law, President Vieira dissolved the Assembly, thus allowing the standing committee to continue working, and appointed a new government composed of loyalists.

Rear Admiral Bubo Na Tchuto tried to organize a coup on August 7, 2008, but the attempt was put down. Na Tchuto managed to escape the country. The attempted coup added to instability ahead of parliamentary elections. Gambia subsequently arrested Na Tchuto. He later returned to Guinea-Bissau disguised as a fisherman, and took refuge at a UN compound. Although the UN agreed to surrender him to the government, Na Tchuto continued to reside in the compound. As a result of his return, security in the country was tightened, contributing to uncertainty and instability.

On April 1, 2010, soldiers entered UN offices and arrested Na Tchuto. The same day, more soldiers entered Prime Minister Carlos Gomes Júnior's residence and detained him on the premises. Simultaneously, forty military officers, including Zamora Induta, head of Guinea-Bissau's armed forces, were confined at an army base. Hundreds of the PM's supporters demanded his release. In response, the deputy army chief, Antonio Indjai, said: "If the people continue to go out into the streets to show their support for Carlos Gomes Junior, then I will kill Carlos Gomes Junior ... or I will send someone to kill him."

=== 2011 attempted coup ===
After Army chief of staff General Antonio Indjai was reported arrested by the orders of navy chief Rear Admiral Jose Americo Bubo Na Tchuto, his troops freed him as Prime Minister Carlos Gomes Júnior sought political asylum at the Angolan embassy. Indjai then said that his naval counterpart had been arrested. These events occurred while President Sanha had been in Paris, France for medical care.

=== 2012 coup ===
On 12 April 2012, the military took over the central district of the capital. On 16 April, military leaders and a coalition of political parties announced the formation of a Transitional National Council, under international pressure.

=== 2019 disputed election ===
Presidential elections were held in Guinea-Bissau on 24 November 2019.

In the first round of voting, Domingos Simões Pereira led the field, with 40.13% of the vote. Incumbent president José Mário Vaz finished fourth in the first round of voting, failing to progress to the runoff. According to the preliminary and final results published by the national commission of elections, Umaro Sissoco Embaló won the runoff vote against Simões Pereira, 54% to 46%. Simões Pereira continues to dispute the results. Although neither the supreme court of Guinea-Bissau nor the parliament had given its approval for the official swearing-in ceremony, Sissoco Embaló had organized an alternative swearing-in ceremony in a hotel in Bissau to announce himself as legal president of Guinea-Bissau. Several politicians in Guinea-Bissau, including prime minister Aristides Gomes, accused Sissoco Embaló of arranging a coup d'état, although outgoing president Mário Vaz stepped down to allow Embaló to take power.

José Mário Vaz was the President of Guinea-Bissau from 2014 until the 2019 presidential elections. For two decades José Mário Vaz was the first elected president who finished his five-year mandate. Umaro Sissoco Embaló was the winner of the election and he took office in February 2020. However he faced a last-minute stand-off with parliament before taking office. Embaló is the first president to be elected without the backing of the PAIGC. On 11 September 2024, President Umaro Sissoco Embaló announced that he would not seek a second term in the upcoming presidential elections scheduled for November 2025.

=== 2025 coup ===
On 26 November 2025, the day before the election results were due to be announced, President Embaló's government was overthrown by Brigadier General Dinis Incanha. Military officers declared "total control" over the country and established the High Military Command for the Restoration of National Security and Public Order led by General Horta Inta-A Na Man. ECOWAS formally suspended Guinea-Bissau's membership on 27 November.

== Executive branch ==
Main office-holders
Office	Name	Party	Since
President	Horta Inta-A Na Man	High Military Command for the Restoration of National Security and Public Order	27 November 2025
Prime Minister	Ilídio Vieira Té	Madem G15	28 November 2025

The president is elected by popular vote for a five-year term. The prime minister is appointed by the president after consultation with party leaders in the legislature. The current president and prime minister were installed by the High Military Command for the Restoration of National Security and Public Order following the coup of 26 November 2025.

== Legislative branch ==
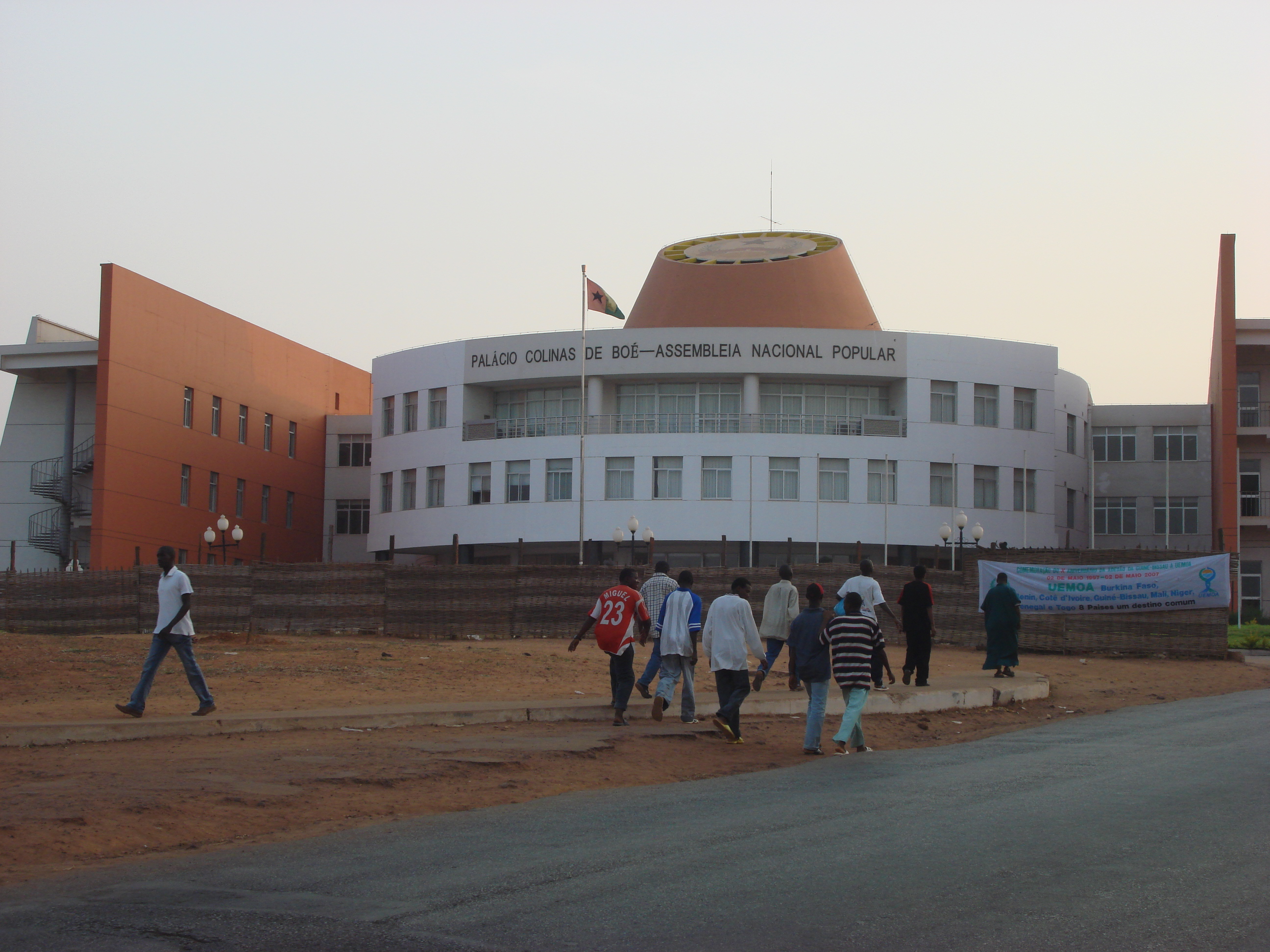
The National People's Assembly.

The National People's Assembly (Assembleia Nacional Popular) has 102 members, elected for four-year terms in multi-member constituencies.

== Political parties and elections ==
=== Presidential elections ===
In the first round of voting Domingos Simões Pereira led the field, with 40.13% of the vote. Incumbent president José Mário Vaz finished fourth in the first round of voting, failing to progress to the runoff. According to the preliminary and final results published by the national commission of elections, Umaro Sissoco Embaló won the runoff vote against Simões Pereira, 54% to 46%.

Candidate	Party	First round		Second round	
Candidate	Party	Votes	%	Votes	%
Domingos Simões Pereira	African Party for the Independence of Guinea and Cape Verde	222,870	40.13	254,468	46.45
Umaro Sissoco Embaló	Madem G15	153,530	27.65	293,359	53.55
Nuno Gomes Nabiam	Assembly of the People United	73,063	13.16		
José Mário Vaz	Independent	68,933	12.41		
Carlos Gomes Júnior	Independent	14,766	2.66		
Baciro Djá	Patriotic Front of National Salvation	7,126	1.28		
Vicente Fernandes	Democratic Convergence Party	4,250	0.77		
Mamadú Iaia Djaló	New Democracy Party	2,813	0.51		
Idrissa Djaló	National Unity Party	2,569	0.46		
Mutaro Intai Djabi	Independent	2,385	0.43		
Gabriel Fernando Indi	United Social Democratic Party	1,982	0.36		
António Afonso Té	Republican Party for Independence and Development	1,061	0.19		
Total		555,348	100.00	547,827	100.00
Valid votes		555,348	98.04	547,827	98.97
Invalid/blank votes		11,125	1.96	5,694	1.03
Total votes		566,473	100.00	553,521	100.00
Registered voters/turnout		761,676	74.37	761,676	72.67
Source: CNE, CNE

=== Parliamentary elections ===
Party	Votes	%	Seats	+/–
African Party for the Independence of Guinea and Cape Verde	212,148	35.22	47	–10
Party for Social Renewal	127,104	21.10	21	–20
Madem G15	126,935	21.07	27	New
Assembly of the People United	51,049	8.47	5	New
Patriotic Front of National Salvation	13,926	2.31	0	New
Democratic Convergence Party	9,864	1.64	0	–2
New Democracy Party	9,019	1.50	1	0
Union for Change	8,535	1.42	1	0
Resistance of Guinea-Bissau-Bafatá Movement	6,959	1.16	0	0
African National Congress	6,005	1.00	0	New
Patriotic Movement	5,756	0.96	0	New
Guinean Movement for Development	4,542	0.75	0	New
Guinean Patriotic Union	4,407	0.73	0	0
Social Democratic Party	2,854	0.47	0	0
Party of Justice, Reconciliation and Labor–Platform of Democratic Forces	2,849	0.47	0	New
Guinean Democratic Movement	2,789	0.46	0	New
Republican Party for Independence and Development	2,622	0.44	0	0
Democratic Centre	2,444	0.41	0	New
National Unity Party	958	0.16	0	New
Democratic Party for Development	861	0.14	0	New
Manifest Party of the People	755	0.13	0	0
Total	602,381	100.00	102	0
Valid votes	602,381	93.38		
Invalid votes	20,827	3.23		
Blank votes	21,877	3.39		
Total votes	645,085	100.00		
Registered voters/turnout	761,676	84.69		
Source: CNE (1), CNE (2)

== Judicial branch ==
The Supreme Court (Supremo Tribunal da Justiça) consists of nine justices, who are appointed by the president and serve at his pleasure. It is the final court of appeals in criminal and civil cases. Regional courts, one in each of the country's nine regions, are the first courts of appeal for sectoral court decisions, and hear all felony cases, as well as civil cases concerning more than $1,000. Below these are 24 sectoral Courts, presided over by judges who are not necessarily trained in the law, which hear civil cases under $1,000 and misdemeanor criminal cases.

== Administrative divisions ==
Guinea-Bissau is divided in 9 regions (regiões, singular - região): Bafata, Biombo, Bissau, Bolama, Cacheu, Gabu, Oio, Quinara, and Tombali.

== International organization participation ==
ACCT (associate), ACP, AfDB, ECA, ECOWAS, FAO, FZ, G-77, IBRD, ICAO, ICFTU, ICRM, IDA, IDB, IFAD, IFC, IFRCS, ILO, IMF, IMO, Intelsat, Interpol, IOC, IOM, ITU, NAM, OAU, OIC, OPCW, UN, UNCTAD, UNESCO, UNIDO, UPU, WADB (regional), WAEMU, WFTU, WHO, WIPO, WMO, WToO, WTrO
