= List of coups and coup attempts since 2010 =

This is a list of coups d'état, coups attempts and coup plots since 2010. They include a total of 73 in Africa, 20 in Asia, 14 in Europe, 8 in the Americas and 1 in the Pacific.

== Coups and coup attempts since 2010 ==
=== Africa ===
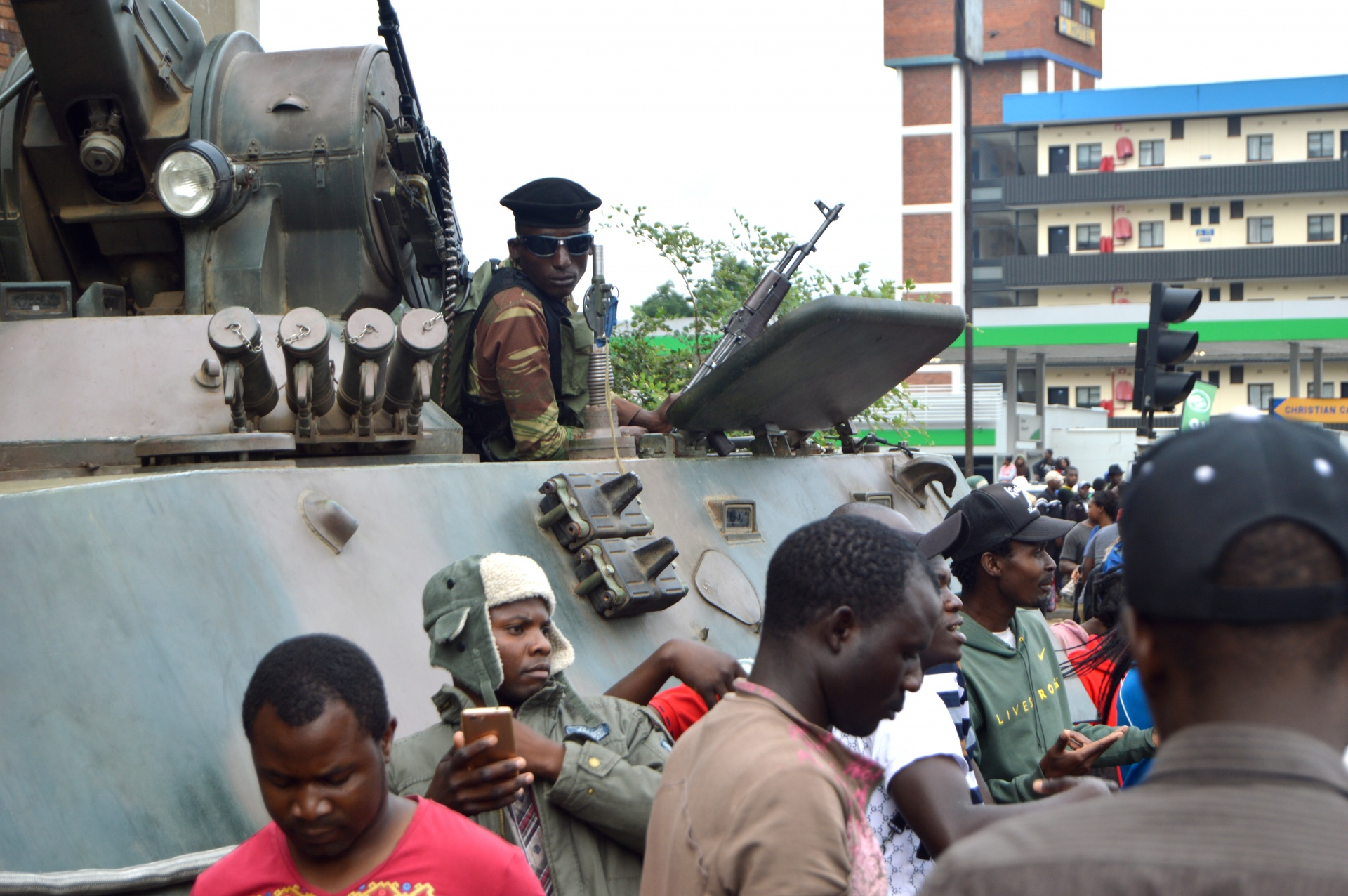
A tank in downtown Harare

Event	Date	Type	Country	Coup leaders	Head of state/government	Notes	Refs
2010 Nigerien coup d'état	18 February 2010	Coup	Niger	Chef d'éscadron Salou Djibo	President Mamadou Tandja	President kidnapped and opposition leader elected into power.	
2010 Guinea-Bissau unrest	1 April 2010	Attempt	Guinea-Bissau	Admiral Bubo Na Tchuto; Deputy Chief of Staff of the Army Antonio Ndjai	Prime Minister Carlos Gomes Júnior	The head of the army was captured and the Prime Minister was briefly arrested by military officers.	
2010 Madagascar coup attempt	17 – 18 November 2010	Attempt	Madagascar	Ex-Defence Minister N. Rakotonandrasanana and Col. C. Andrianasoaviana, Head of the Special Intervention Force	President Andry Rajoelina		
Tunisian revolution	14 January 2011	Coup	Tunisia	Tunisian Opposition	President Zine El Abidine Ben Ali	A series of street demonstrations which took place in Tunisia, and led to the ousting of longtime dictator Zine El Abidine Ben Ali in January 2011.	
2011 Egyptian coup d'état	11 February 2011	Coup	Egypt	Chairman of the Supreme Council of the Armed Forces Mohamed Hussein Tantawi	President Hosni Mubarak	Following mass protests and an army's communiqué, Mubarak resigned. According to Article 84 of the 1971 Egyptian constitution, the speaker of the People's Assembly Sorour should have succeeded him, but Mubarak instead delegated power to the Supreme Council of the Armed Forces led by Tantawi.	
2011 DR Congo coup d'état attempt	27 February 2011	Attempt	DR Congo	Unknown	President Joseph Kabila	Six people were killed in an attack on a residence of the president of the Democratic Republic of Congo.	
2011 Nigerien coup attempt	26 July 2011	Attempt	Niger	Unknown	President Mahamadou Issoufou	Five soldiers were arrested.	
Battle of Tripoli	20 September 2011	Coup	Libya	Mustafa Abdul Jalil	Brotherly Leader Muammar Gaddafi	On September 20, Gaddafi's government was overthrown following the fall of Tripoli to anti-Gaddafi forces during the Libyan civil war.	
2011 Guinea-Bissau coup attempt	26 December 2011	Attempt	Guinea-Bissau	Navy Chief Natchuto Bubo	President Malam Bacai Sanhá		
2012 Malian coup d'état	22 March 2012	Coup	Mali	Capt. Amadou Sanogo	President Amadou Toumani Touré		
2012 Malawian constitutional crisis	5 April 2012	Attempt	Malawi	Peter Mutharika	President Joyce Banda		
2012 Guinea-Bissau coup d'état	12 April 2012	Coup	Guinea-Bissau	Military Command	Interim President Raimundo Pereira		
2012 Malian counter-coup attempt	30 April – 1 May 2012	Attempt	Mali	Amadou Toumani Touré's loyalists	Acting President Dioncounda Traoré, Acting Prime Minister Cheick Modibo Diarra and coup leader and Chairperson of the National Committee for the Restoration of Democracy and State of Mali, Capt. Amadou Sanogo		
2012 Ivorian coup attempt	13 June 2012	Attempt	Ivory Coast	Laurent Gbagbo loyalists	President Alassane Ouattara		
2012 Sudanese coup d'état attempt	22 November 2012	Attempt	Sudan	Unknown	President Omar al-Bashir		
2013 Eritrean Army mutiny	21 January 2013	Attempt	Eritrea	Unknown	President Isaias Afwerki		
2013 Benin coup d'état attempt	4 March 2013	Attempt	Benin	Col. Pamphile Zomahoun	President Thomas Boni Yayi		
2013 Central African Republic coup d'état	23–24 March 2013	Coup	Central African Republic	Michel Djotodia	President François Bozizé		
April 2013 Libyan coup d'état attempt	17 April 2013	Attempt	Libya	Muammar Gaddafi loyalists	Prime Minister Ali Zeidan		
2013 Comorian coup attempt	20 April 2013	Attempt	Comoros	Unknown	President Ikililou Dhoinine		
2013 Chadian coup attempt	1 May 2013	Attempt	Chad	Unknown	President Idriss Déby	At least four soldiers killed. Arrest of two generals and an MP.	
2013 Egyptian coup d'état	3 July 2013	Coup	Egypt	Gen. Abdel Fattah el-Sisi	President Mohamed Morsi	Military coup ousts President Mohamed Morsi and his elected government and kills more than 1,150 government supporters.	
October 2013 Libyan coup d'état attempt	10 October 2013	Attempt	Libya	Abdel-Moneim al-Hour	Prime Minister Ali Zeidan		
2013 DR Congo coup d'état attempt	30 December 2013	Attempt	DR Congo	Paul-Joseph Mukungubila	President Joseph Kabila		
February 2014 Libyan coup d'état attempt	14 February 2014	Attempt	Libya	Maj. Gen. Khalifa Haftar	Prime Minister Ali Zeidan		
May 2014 Libyan coup d'état attempt	18 May 2014	Attempt	Libya	Maj. Gen. Khalifa Haftar	Prime Minister Abdullah al-Thani		
2014 Lesotho political crisis	30 August 2014	Attempt	Lesotho	Lt. Gen. Kennedy Tlai Kamoli and Deputy Prime Minister Mothetjoa Metsing	Prime Minister Tom Thabane	Failed coup lead to early elections.	
2014 Burkina Faso uprising	28 October 2014 – 3 November 2014	Coup	Burkina Faso	Yacouba Isaac Zida	President Blaise Compaoré	Lt. Colonel Yacouba Isaac Zida overthrew president Blaise Compaoré and briefly served as head of state before selecting Michel Kafando as the new president. Days later, Kafando appointed Zida as acting prime minister.	
2014 Gambian coup attempt	30 December 2014	Attempt	The Gambia	Lt. Col. Lamin Sanneh	President Yahya Jammeh		
2015 Burundian coup attempt	13 May 2015	Attempt	Burundi	Gen. Godefroid Niyombare	President Pierre Nkurunziza	Three coup leaders arrested whilst Niyombare remains on the run.	
2015 Burkina Faso coup attempt	17 September 2015	Attempt	Burkina Faso	Gen. Gilbert Diendéré	President Michel Kafando	Coup fails and the Regiment of Presidential Security is dissolved.	
2015 Central African Republic coup d'état attempt	26 September – 3 October 2015	Attempt	Central African Republic	Eugene Ngaïkosset and Haroun Gaye	President Catherine Samba-Panza	Coup fails	
2016 Burkina Faso coup d'état attempt	8 October 2016	Attempt	Burkina Faso	Gaston Coulibaly	President Roch Marc Christian Kaboré	Failed coup attempt	
2016–18 Libyan coup d'état attempt	14 October 2016 – 14 November 2018	Attempt	Libya	Prime Minister Khalifa al-Ghawil (claimed)	Prime Minister Fayez al-Sarraj (claimed)		
2016–2017 Gambian constitutional crisis	9 December 2016 – 21 January 2017	Attempt	The Gambia	Government of Gambia	President Yahya Jammeh	The disputed President Yahya Jammeh surrendered presidential duties in favour of Adama Barrow and left the country to exile in Equatorial Guinea after two days after the end of his Presidency.	
2017 Zimbabwean coup d'état	14 – 21 November 2017	Coup	Zimbabwe	Zimbabwe defence forces under Maj. Gen. Constantino Chiwenga	President Robert Mugabe	After military movements are seen and explosions heard in government districts in northern Harare, the ZDF takes over state television and says that President Mugabe is in its custody, but denies mounting a coup. On 21 November, the coup ended with the resignation of Robert Mugabe.	
2017 Equatorial Guinea coup attempt	27 – 28 December 2017	Attempt	Equatorial Guinea	Unknown	President Teodoro Obiang Nguema Mbasogo		
2019 Gabonese coup d'état attempt	7 January 2019	Attempt	Gabon	Lt. Kelly Ondo Obiang	President Ali Bongo Ondimba	Gabonese soldiers seize the national radio and television station declaring the establishment of a "restoration council". The plotters were soon arrested by the Gabonese government.	
Algerian Revolution	2 April 2019	Coup	Algeria	Algerian People's National Army	President Abdelaziz Bouteflika	On April 2, 2019, the president Abdelaziz Bouteflika resigned under pressure from the military, during the Hirak protests.	
2019 Sudanese coup d'état	10 April 2019	Coup	Sudan	Lt. Gen. Ahmed Awad Ibn Auf	President Omar al-Bashir	Sudanese soldiers, led by the former First Vice President, attacked the presidential palace and overthrew the President and his government, resulting in the new government being formed.	
2019 Ethiopian coup d'état attempt	22 June 2019	Attempt	Ethiopia	Brig. Gen. Asaminew Tsige	Prime Minister Abiy Ahmed; President of the Amhara Region Ambachew Mekonnen †	On 22 June Gen. Seare Mekonnen was shot by his bodyguard Prime Minister Abiy Ahmed says that he and another officer tried to prevent the coup. A couple of hours before in Bahir Dar, Amhara Region the local governor Ambachew Mekonnen and an adviser were killed.	
2020 Malian coup d'état	18 – 19 August 2020	Coup	Mali	Col. Assimi Goïta	President Ibrahim Boubacar Keïta; Prime Minister Boubou Cissé	Keïta and Cissé were seized by soldiers in Bamako on 18 August.	
2020–21 Central African Republic coup d'état attempt	17 December 2020 – 13 January 2021	Attempt	Central African Republic	Ex-president François Bozizé	President Faustin-Archange Touadéra	In December 2020 major rebel groups in Central African Republic led by former president François Bozizé formed the Coalition of Patriots for Change. On 13 January they attacked Bangui but were repelled by security forces. Clashes continued.	
2021 Nigerien coup d'état attempt	31 March 2021	Attempt	Niger	Captain Sani Saley Gourouza	Mahamadou Issoufou	The coup attempt took place while Niger was mired in the War in the Sahel, with marked terrorism and inter-ethnic violence.	
2021 Malian coup d'état	24 May 2021	Coup	Mali	Col. Assimi Goïta	President Bah Ndaw; Prime Minister Moctar Ouane	After the successful coup in 2020, led by Assimi Goïta, Bah N'Daw was installed as interim president. In May 2021, two members of the cabinet, appointed after the 2020 coup, were replaced by N'Daw, sparking simmering tensions.	
2021 Northern Chad offensive	20 April 2021	Coup	Chad	Mahamat Déby	President Idriss Déby	After Mahamat's father, Idriss Déby, died at the hands of FACT on 20 April 2021, the military announced that the elected government and National Assembly were dissolved and that a Transitional Military Council led by Mahamat would lead the nation for 18 months.	
2021 Tunisian self-coup	25 July 2021	Self-Coup	Tunisia	President Kais Saied	Tunisian Parliament		
2021 Guinean coup d'état	5 September 2021	Coup	Guinea	Col. Mamady Doumbouya	President Alpha Condé		
September 2021 Sudanese coup d'état attempt	21 September 2021	Attempt	Sudan	Unknown	Sovereignty Council of Sudan		
October–November 2021 Sudanese coup d'état	25 October 2021	Coup	Sudan	Gen. Abdel Fattah al-Burhan	Abdalla Hamdok	Following the unsuccessful coup a month earlier, military forces led by Abdel Fattah al-Burhan arrested the prime minister and other government officials, dissolved the government and established a state of emergency.	
January 2022 Burkina Faso coup d'état	24 January 2022	Coup	Burkina Faso	Lt. Col. Paul-Henri Sandaogo Damiba	Roch Marc Christian Kaboré		
2022 Guinea-Bissau coup d'état attempt	1 February 2022	Attempt	Guinea Bissau	Unknown	Umaro Sissoco Embaló		
2022 Malian coup d'état attempt	16–17 May 2022	Attempt	Mali	Western-backed military officers	Col. Assimi Goïta		
September 2022 Burkina Faso coup d'état	30 September 2022	Coup	Burkina Faso	Capt. Ibrahim Traoré	Lt. Col. Paul-Henri Sandaogo Damiba		
2022 São Tomé and Príncipe coup d'état attempt	24–25 November 2022	Attempt	São Tomé and Príncipe	Arlecio Costa; Delfim Neves	Prime Minister Patrice Trovoada	Former president of the National Assembly of São Tomé and Príncipe Delfim Neves was arrested after initiating an attack against the headquarters of the Armed Forces of São Tomé and Príncipe. 12 soldiers were involved in the attack, while 4 people were killed in a gunfight.	
2022 Gambian coup d'état attempt	20 December 2022	Attempt	The Gambia	LCpl Sanna Fadera	President Adama Barrow	Four soldiers arrested on suspicion of involvement.	
Sudan coup attempt in 2023	15 April 2023 – ongoing	Attempt	Sudan	Mohamed Hamdan Dagalo	Abdel Fattah al-Burhan	Clashes broke out between the paramilitary Rapid Support Forces, and the Sudanese Armed Forces. The fighting began with attacks from the Rapid Support Forces on key government sites, including several different military bases located around the country.	
2023 Nigerien coup d'état	26–28 July 2023	Coup	Niger	Col Amadou Abdramane and Gen. Abdourahamane Tiani	President Mohamed Bazoum	President Mohamed Bazoum was ousted in a coup led by Colonel Amadou Abdramane. The reasoning for the coup announced by Abdramane via national television was dissatisfaction "due to the deteriorating security situation and bad governance."	
2023 Sierra Leone coup plot	31 July 2023	Attempt	Sierra Leone	Unknown	President Julius Maada Bio	The police arrested 19 people, including fourteen serving personnel of the Republic of Sierra Leone Armed Forces, two officers of the Sierra Leone Police and one retired chief superintendent of police who were allegedly planning a coup between August 7 and 10. In addition, five military officers and three police officers have a search and capture warrant.	
2023 Gabonese coup d'état	30 August 2023	Coup	Gabon	Gen. Brice Oligui	President Ali Bongo Ondimba	Following the 2023 Gabonese general election, and president of Gabon's Ali Bongo Ondimba's declaration of victory, soldiers from the presidential guard announced the cancellation of the election, and the "dissolution of the regime."	
2023 Burkina Faso coup d’état attempt	26 September 2023	Attempt	Burkina Faso	Dissidents of the Burkina Faso Armed Forces	President Ibrahim Traoré	Burkina Faso's junta announced on 27 September that a coup d’état attempt was foiled the previous day. Four of the six plotters of the coup were arrested.	
2023 Sierra Leone coup attempt	26 November 2023	Attempt	Sierra Leone	Unknown	President Julius Maada Bio	Militants attacked several locations in Freetown, the capital of Sierra Leone. The attacks were repelled by security forces. Sierra Leone's information minister stated that the attacks were performed to "subvert and overthrow" the country's government.	
2023 Guinea-Bissau coup attempt	30 November - 1 December 2023	Attempt	Guinea Bissau	Victor Tchongo	President Umaro Sissoco Embaló		
2024 Democratic Republic of the Congo coup attempt	19 May 2024	Attempt	DR Congo	Christian Malanga	President Félix Tshisekedi		
2024 Tigray coup d'état	7 October 2024	Coup	Ethiopia	Tigray People's Liberation Front	Getachew Reda	Interim Regional Administration of Tigray president Getachew Reda was overthrown by the Tigray People's Liberation Front.	
2025 N'Djamena attack	8 January 2025	Attempt	Chad	Boko Haram	President Mahamat Déby	An armed commando unit attacked the presidential palace in the capital N'Djamena, killing at least 18 of its 24 members on January 8.	
2025 Malian coup attempt	1 August 2025	Attempt	Mali	Gen. Abass Dembele and Gen. Nema Sagara	Gen. Assimi Goïta	The Malian junta stated that it foiled a coup plot led by French intelligence.	
2025 Nigeria coup attempt	30 September 2025	Attempt	Nigeria	Col. Mohammed Alhassan Ma'aji	President Bola Tinubu		
2025 Malagasy coup d'état	12-14 October 2025	Coup	Madagascar	Col. Michael Randrianirina	President Andry Rajoelina	After weeks of protest, the CAPSAT unit of the Madagascar Armed Forces mutinied and seized control of the capital Antananarivo. President Andry Rajoelina was impeached by the National Assembly and General Michael Randrianirina installed as president.	
2025 Guinea-Bissau coup d'état	26 November 2025	Coup	Guinea-Bissau	Brig. Gen. Dinis Incanha and Gen. Horta Inta-A Na Man	President Umaro Sissoco Embaló	On 26 November 2025, gunfire was heard in parts of Bissau, the capital of Guinea-Bissau, with the country's president Umaro Sissoco Embaló saying that he had been arrested as part of a coup d'état carried out by the army chief of staff and military officers declaring "total control" over the country and establishing the High Military Command for the Restoration of National Security and Public Order. The coup occurred a day before the results of the 2025 Guinea-Bissau general election held on 23 November, in which Embaló was running for reelection, were expected to be officially announced.	
2025 Beninese coup attempt	7 December 2025	Attempt	Benin	Lt. Col. Pascal Tigri	President Patrice Talon		
2026 Mali offensives	25 April 2026 – present	Attempt	Mali	Iyad Ag Ghali	President Assimi Goita		
2026 Nigerien coup attempt	29 August 2026	Attempt	Niger	Dissident faction of the Niger Armed Forces	President Abdourahamane Tiani		

=== Asia ===
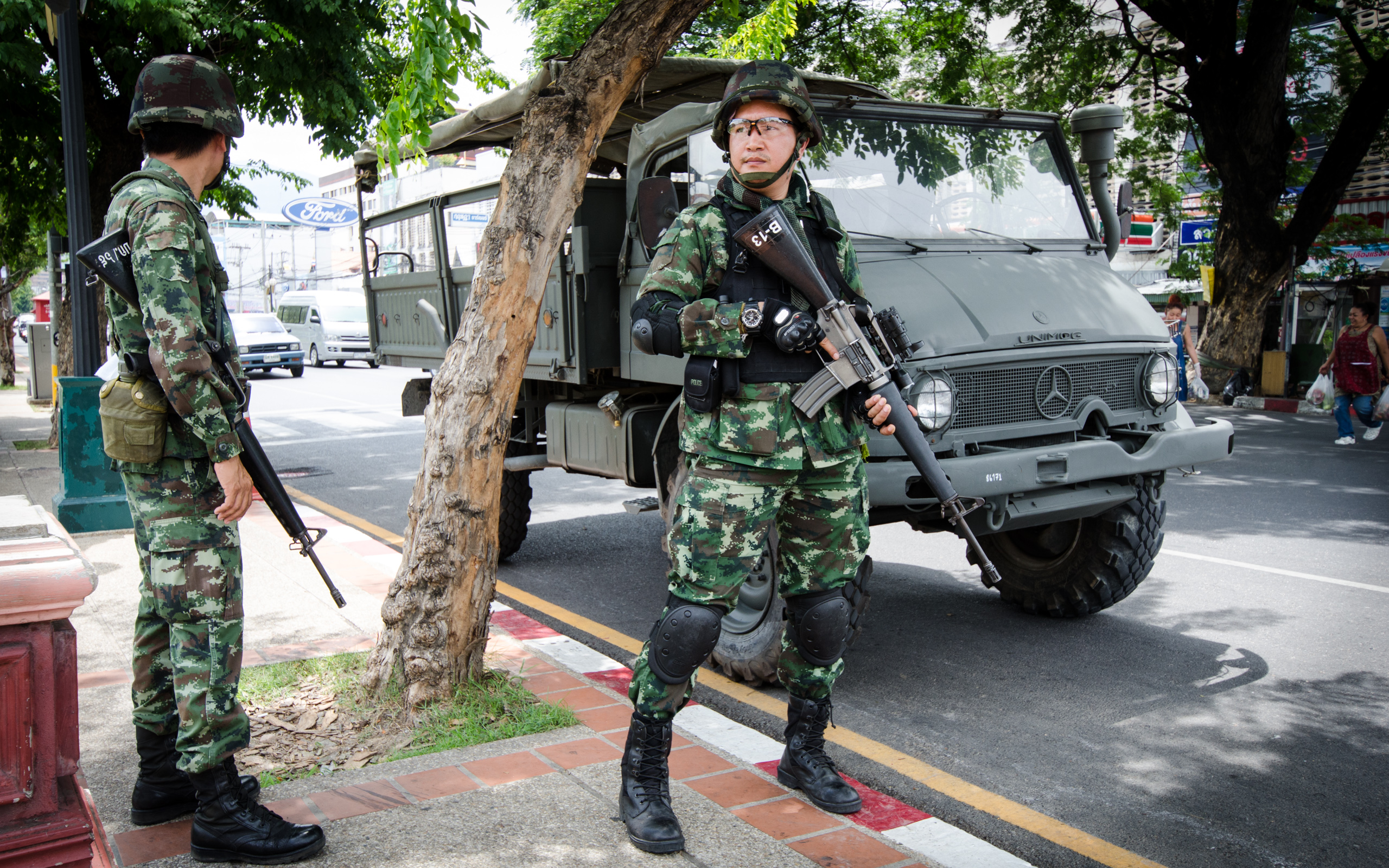
Thai soldiers at the Chang Phueak Gate in Chiang Mai.

Event	Date	Type	Country	Coup leaders	Head of state/government	Notes	Refs
2011 Dhabyani coup attempt	February 2011	Attempt	United Arab Emirates	Hamdan bin Zayed bin Sultan Al Nahyan	President Khalifa bin Zayed Al Nahyan	Amid the Arab Spring, forces loyal to President Khalifa Al Nahyan foiled a coup plot led by Prince Hamdan Al Nahyan, which allegedly sought to transition the UAE from an autocratic system to a constitutional monarchy.	
2011 Bahraini uprising	14 February – 18 March 2011	Attempt	Bahrain	Bahraini opposition	King of BahrainHamad bin Isa Al Khalifa and House of Khalifa	The 2011 Bahraini uprising was a series of anti-government protests in Bahrain led by the mainly Shia and some Sunni Bahraini opposition primairly from 2011 until 2014. The protests were inspired by the unrest of the 2011 Arab Spring and protests in Tunisia and Egypt and escalated to daily clashes after the Bahraini government put the revolt down with the support of the Gulf Cooperation Council and Peninsula Shield Force.	
2011 Bangladesh coup d'état attempt	December 2011	Attempt	Bangladesh	Maj. Syed Ziaul Haque	Prime Minister Sheikh Hasina		
2012 Syrian coup attempt	15 July – 4 August 2012	Attempt	Syria	Syrian opposition	President Bashar al-Assad	Syrian opposition fails to overthrow President Bashar al-Assad.	
2013 Syrian coup attempt	7 April 2013 – 14 April 2018	Attempt	Syria	Syrian opposition	President Bashar al-Assad	The anti-government forces failed to overthrow President Bashar al-Assad.	
2014 Thai coup d'état	22 May 2014	Coup	Thailand	Gen. Prayut Chan-o-cha	Acting Prime Minister Niwatthamrong Boonsongpaisan	2013–2014 Thai political crisis and subsequent military coup oust Thai elected government, replaced by the National Council for Peace and Order.	
2014–2015 Yemeni coup d'état	21 September 2014 – 6 February 2015	Coup	Yemen	Houthis	President Abdrabbuh Mansur Hadi	Coup resulted in Yemeni Civil War (2014–present)	
2016 Turkish coup d'état attempt	15 – 16 July 2016	Attempt	Turkey	Peace at Home Council	President Recep Tayyip Erdoğan	Failed attempt by factions of different branches of the armed forces at gaining control of the government.	
2016 Filipino coup attempt	20 September 2016	Attempt	Philippines	Loida Nicolas Lewis (Alleged)	President Rodrigo Duterte	The government claimed that a coup was being plotted against President Rodrigo Duterte by Filipino-Americans living in New York City.	
2018 Yemeni coup d'état	28 – 31 January 2018	Coup	Yemen	Southern Transitional Council	President Abdrabbuh Mansur Hadi		
2020 Saudi Arabian coup plot	7 March 2020	Attempt	Saudi Arabia	Muhammad bin Nayef	Crown Prince of Saudi Arabia Mohammed bin Salman	The Saudi Arabian government arrested Princes Ahmed bin Abdulaziz, Muhammad bin Nayef, Nayef bin Ahmed, Nawwaf bin Nayef and Muhammad bin Saad for allegedly planning a coup attempt.	
2021 Myanmar coup d'état	1 February 2021 – 2 February 2021	Coup	Myanmar	Gen. Min Aung Hlaing	State Councillor Aung San Suu Kyi	The coup resulted in the Myanmar protests (2021–present) and the Myanmar civil war (2021–present)	
2021 arrests in Jordan	3 April 2021	Attempt	Jordan	Prince Hamzah bin Hussein	King Abdullah II	On 3 April, Jordanian authorities arrested top officials and members of the royal family, including former Crown Prince Hamzah bin Hussein, for involvement in an attempted coup.	
2021 Afghan coup d'état	15 August 2021	Coup	Afghanistan	Hibatullah Akhundzada	President Ashraf Ghani	On 15 August, the Taliban captured the capital of Afghanistan, Kabul, and removed the government of the Islamic Republic of Afghanistan under President of Afghanistan Ashraf Ghani from power.	
2022 Kazakh unrest	2–11 January 2022	Attempt	Kazakhstan	Kazakh opposition	President Kassym-Jomart Tokayev	A series of mass protests and civil unrest that began in Kazakhstan on 2 January 2022 after a sudden sharp increase in liquefied petroleum gas prices following the lifting of a government-enforced price cap on 1 January. The protests began peacefully in the oil-producing city of Zhanaozen and quickly spread to other cities in the country, especially the nation's largest city, Almaty, which saw its demonstrations turn into violent riots, fueled by rising dissatisfaction with the government and widespread poverty.	
Attempted coup in Kyrgyzstan in 2024	5 July 2024	Attempt	Kyrgyzstan	Islamic terrorists	President Sadyr Japarov	Kyrgyz security services arrested five on charges of organising a coup attempt on July 5.	
July Uprising	5 August 2024	Coup	Bangladesh	Bangladesh Armed Forces	Prime Minister Sheikh Hasina	On 5 August, Prime Minister Sheikh Hasina was overthrown by the military of Bangladesh.	
2024 South Korean martial law	3 December 2024	Attempt	South Korea	President Yoon Suk Yeol	National Assembly	Yoon announced the proclamation of martial law, the end of all political activities and forbidding of the members of the National Assembly to meet. The National Assembly immediately voted 190–0 to remove the law, and Yoon complied hours later, ending the self-coup attempt. Yoon was impeached and removed from office as a result of his proclamation of martial law.	
Coup d'état in Syria in 2024	7–8 December 2024	Coup	Syria	Ahmed al-Sharaa	President Bashar al-Assad	On 8 December 2024, the Assad regime collapsed during a major offensive by opposition forces.	
2025 Azerbaijani coup plot	January 2025	Attempt	Azerbaijan	Ramiz Mehdiyev	President Ilham Aliyev		

=== Europe ===
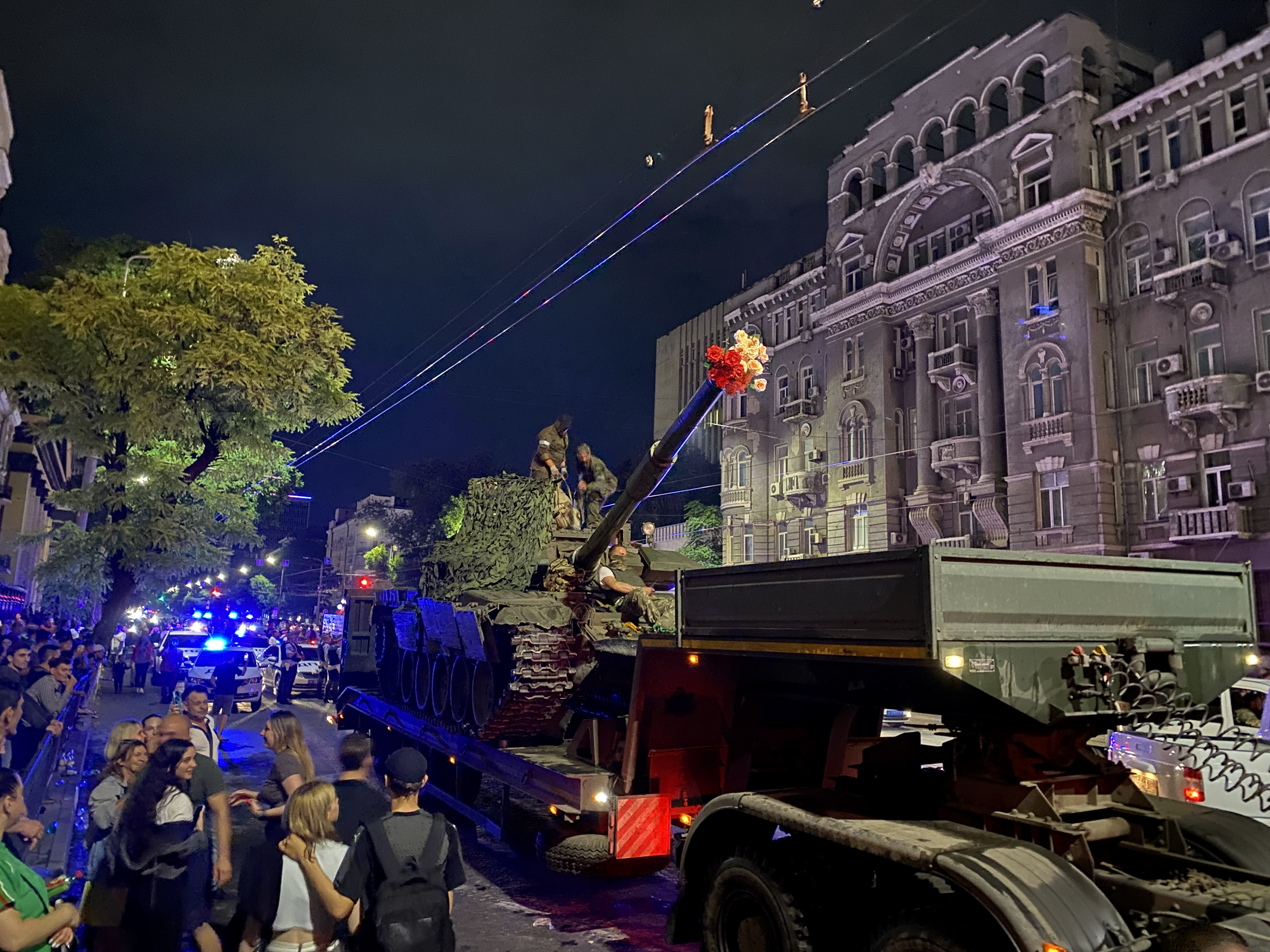
A crowd in Rostov-on-Don watching a Wagner tank with flowers sticking out of its muzzle

Event	Date	Type	Country	Coup leaders	Head of state/government	Notes	Refs
Abkhaz Revolution of 2014	27 May – 1 June	Coup	Abkhazia	Raul Khadjimba	President Aleksandr Ankvab		
2016 Montenegrin coup attempt allegations	16 October 2016	Attempt	Montenegro	Pro-Russian loyalists	President Filip Vujanović; Prime Minister Duško Marković		
2017 Luhansk coup	21 October 2017 – 24 November 2017	Coup	Luhansk People's Republic	Leonid Pasechnik	Head of the Luhansk People's Republic Igor Plotnitsky	A political crisis in the Russian-backed breakaway Luhansk People's Republic occurred in 2017 which was characterized by a confrontation between the Head of the Luhansk People's Republic, Igor Plotnitsky, and the head of the Ministry of Internal Affairs, Igor Kornet, which ended with the resignation of Plotnitsky.	
2021 Armenian coup d'état attempt	25 February 2021	Attempt	Armenia	Onik Gasparyan	Prime Minister Nikol Pashinyan	On 25 February, the Armenian Armed Forces chief of staff Onik Gasparyan called on Prime Minister of Armenia Nikol Pashinyan to resign due to his handling of the 2020 Nagorno-Karabakh war and after the dismissal of the first deputy-head of army.	
2021 Ukrainian coup attempt allegations	November 2021	Attempt	Ukraine	Pro-Russian loyalists	President Volodymyr Zelenskyy		
2022 Ukrainian coup d'état attempt	February 2022	Attempt	Ukraine	Russian Federal Security Service (FSB)	President Volodymyr Zelenskyy		
2022 German coup d'état plot	December 2022	Attempt	Germany	Heinrich Prinz Reuss	President Frank-Walter Steinmeier; Chancellor Olaf Scholz		
2023 Moldovan coup attempt allegations	February 2023	Attempt	Moldova	Pro-Russian loyalists	President Maia Sandu		
Wagner Group rebellion	23 – 24 June 2023	Attempt	Russia	Yevgeny Prigozhin	President Vladimir Putin		
2024 Ukrainian coup attempt allegations	June 2024	Attempt	Ukraine	Pro-Russian loyalists	President Volodymyr Zelenskyy		
2024 Armenian coup attempt allegations	18 September 2024	Attempt	Armenia	Pro-Russian loyalists	Prime Minister Nikol Pashinyan	On 18 September 2024, the Government of Armenia announced that the National Security Service (NSS) had thwarted a coup attempt by Armenian Russophiles armed, trained, and financed by the Russian Federation.	
2025 Romanian coup d'état attempt allegations	6 March 2025	Attempt	Romania	Radu Theodoru	Acting President Ilie Bolojan	In March 2025, the government of Romania arrested six suspects on charges of plotting to overthrow the government. Those arrested were in contact with Radu Theodoru, a 101-year-old retired general and Holocaust denier, whose residence was searched by law enforcement, and were accused of links with Russia.	
2025 Georgian uprising attempt	4 de outubro de 2025	Attempt	Georgia	Organizational Committee	Prime Minister Irakli Kobakhidze		
2026 Polish coup d'état allegations	30 October 2026 – present	Attempt	Poland	Prime Minister Donald Tusk	9th President of the Constitutional Tribunal Bogdan Święczkowski	On 30–31 October Prime Minister Donald Tusk ordered the removal of judges from the Constitutional Tribunal appointed by the previously ruling Law and Justice party, which sparked a major constitutional crisis.	

=== Oceania ===
Event	Date	Type	Country	Coup leaders	Head of state/government	Notes	Refs
2012 PNG Defence Force mutiny	26 January 2012	Small-scale mutiny, described by some as a coup attempt.	Papua New Guinea	Col. Yaura Sasa	Prime Minister Peter O'Neill		

=== North America ===
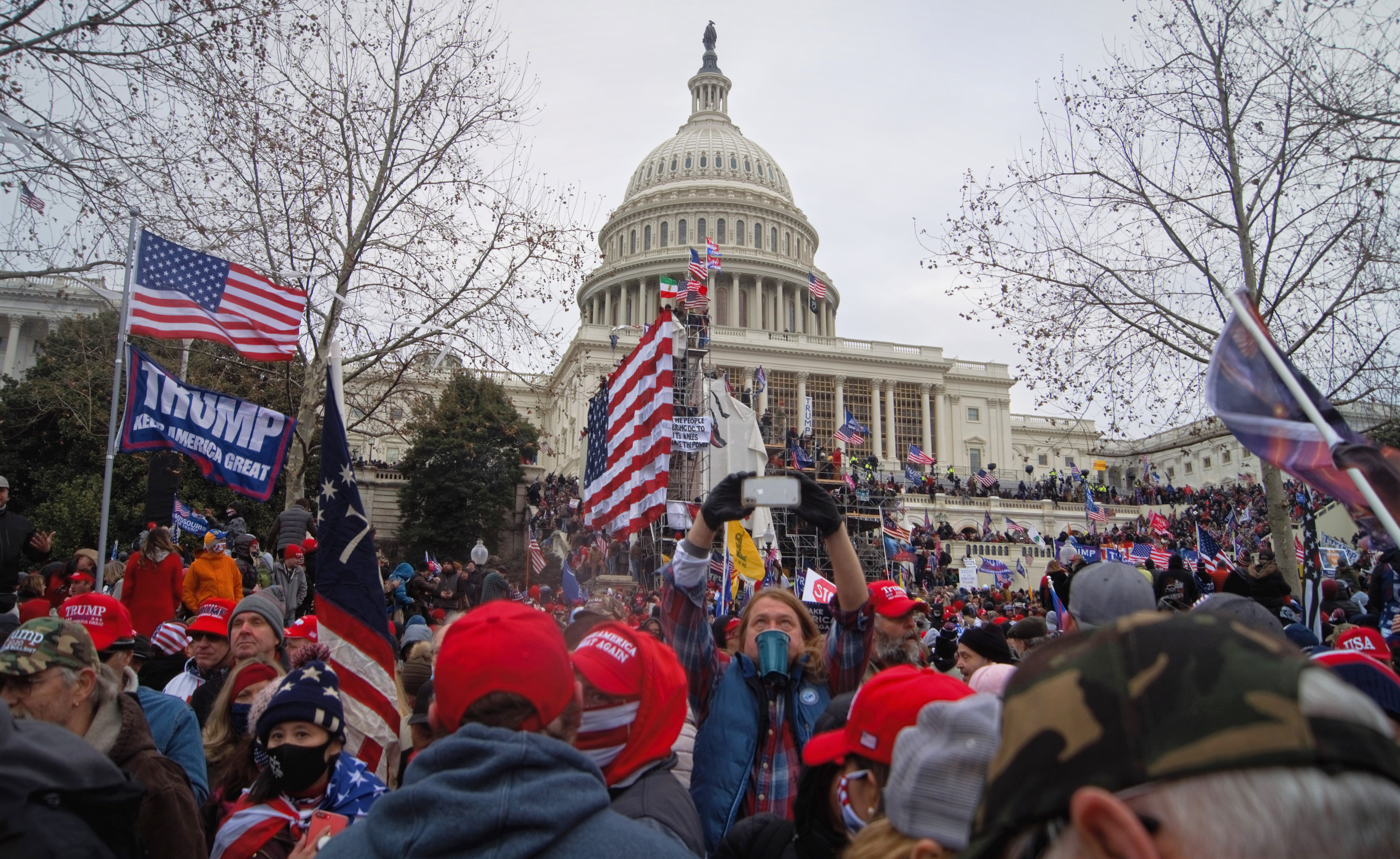
A crowd outside of the US Capitol building.

Event	Date	Type	Country	Coup leaders	Head of state/government	Notes	Refs
January 6 United States Capitol attack	6 January 2021	Attempt	United States	President Donald Trump	117th United States Congress	On 6 January 2021, President Donald Trump attempted a coup according to Congressman Bennie Thompson, Chair of the United States House Select Committee on the January 6 Attack. Several intelligence agencies for NATO countries also described the events as an attempted coup.	

=== South America ===
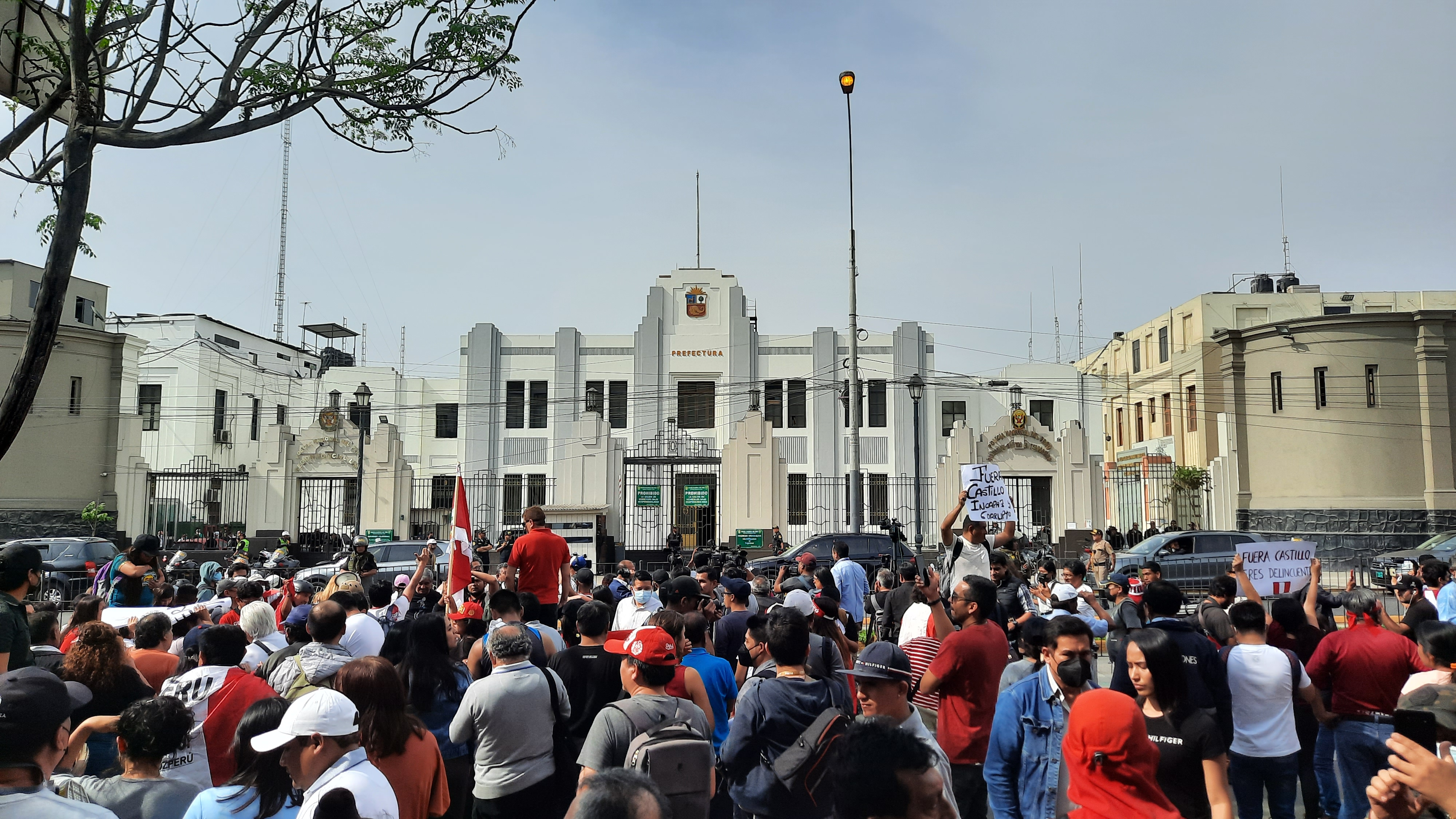
Protests outside the Lima Prefecture, where Pedro Castillo was detained following the self-coup attempt

Event	Date	Type	Country	Coup leaders	Head of state/government	Notes	Ref
2010 Ecuador crisis	30 September	Attempt	Ecuador	Unknown	President Rafael Correa	President Correa was attacked, then temporarily trapped in a hospital in what the secretary-general of the Organization of American States called "a coup d'etat in the making". He was later rescued by loyal troops.	
2019 Venezuelan uprising attempt	30 April 2019	Attempt	Venezuela	Juan Guaidó, IV National Assembly of Venezuela	President Nicolás Maduro	Juan Guaidó unsuccessfully attempted to overthrow the government of Nicolás Maduro during the Venezuelan presidential crisis.	
2019 Bolivian political crisis	10 November 2019	Coup	Bolivia	Armed Forces of Bolivia	President Evo Morales	The Armed Forces of Bolivia suggested that President Evo Morales resign, leading to Jeanine Áñez assuming the presidency following the resignation of Morales.	
Operation Gideon (2020)	3–4 May 2020	Attempt	Venezuela	Venezuelan dissidents and American mercenaries	President Nicolás Maduro	Attempt by Venezuelan dissidents with aid from American mercenaries to overthrow Nicolas Maduro.	
2022 Peruvian self-coup d'état attempt	7 December 2022	Attempt	Peru	President Pedro Castillo	Government of Peru	President Pedro Castillo attempted to dissolve the Peruvian Congress in the face of imminent impeachment by the legislative body. His decision of dissolving congress was rejected by both the Armed Forces and the Constitutional Court which resulted to Castillo being impeached and detained by Congress. He was replaced later that day by Vice President Dina Boluarte as the President of Peru.	
2023 Brazilian Congress attack	8 January 2023	Attempt	Brazil	Ongoing investigation	President Luiz Inácio Lula da Silva		
2024 Bolivian coup attempt	26 June 2024	Attempt	Bolivia	General Juan José Zúñiga	President Luis Arce	The Bolivian Army blocked Plaza Murillo and stormed the presidential palace Casa Grande del Pueblo in an attempt to overthrow President Luis Arce but later withdrew.	
2026 United States intervention in Venezuela	3 January 2026	Coup	Venezuela	United States Department of Defense	President Nicolás Maduro	The United States Army launched a military strike in Venezuela and captured incumbent Venezuelan president Nicolás Maduro and his wife, Cilia Flores.	

== See also ==
- Coup d'état
- List of coups and coup attempts
- List of coups and coup attempts by country
- List of revolutions and rebellions (chronological listing)
