= Chief of the High Command =

De facto leading position of Guinea-Bissau

- Emblem of Guinea-Bissau

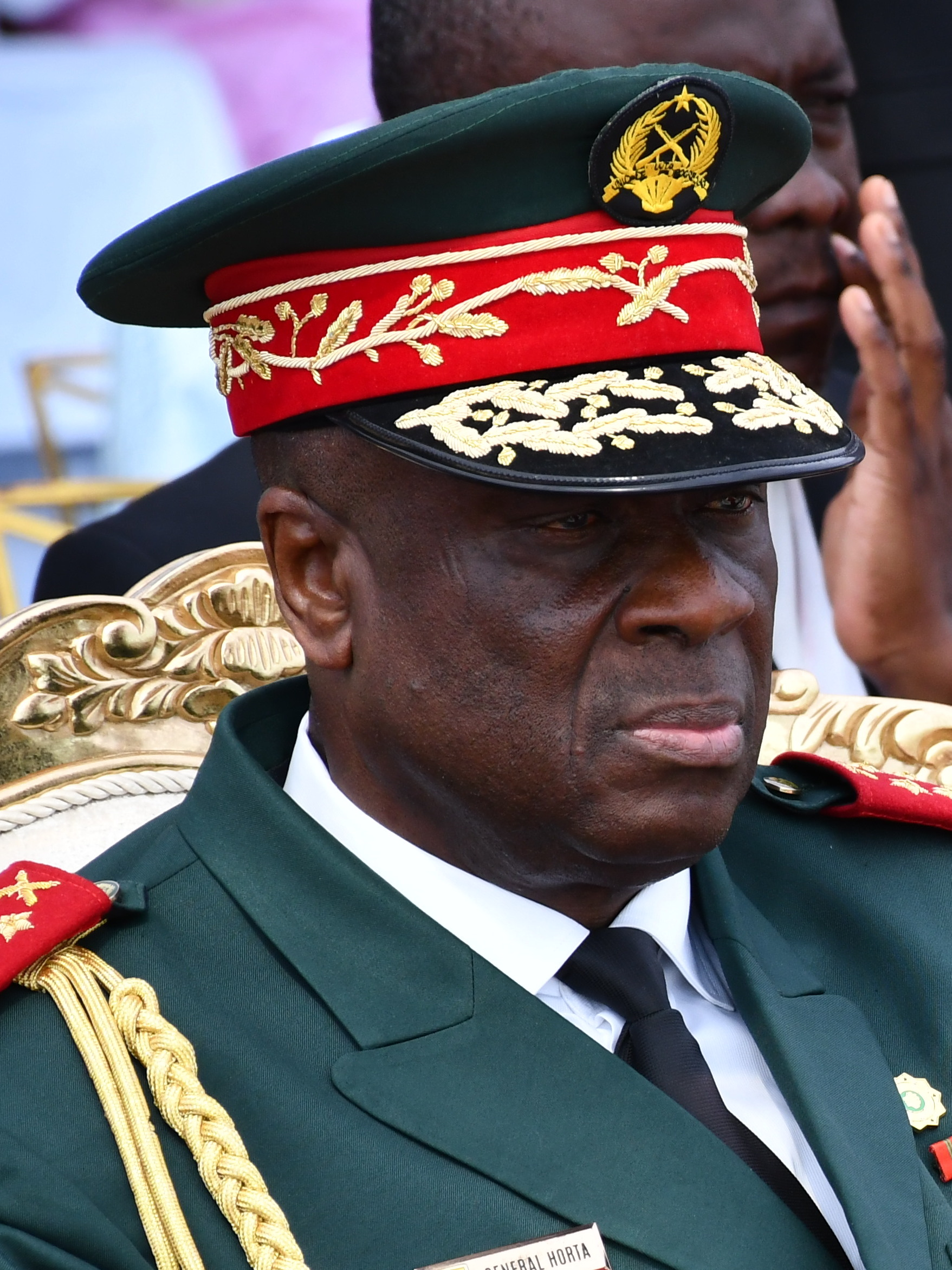
- Incumbent; Horta Inta-A Na Man since 27 November 2025
- Type: De facto leader: Head of state (de facto); Head of government (de facto)
- Member of: High Military Command for the Restoration of National Security and Public Order
- Seat: Bissau
- Appointer: High Military Command for the Restoration of National Security and Public Order
- Term length: One year
- Formation: 26 November 2025
- First holder: Dinis Incanha

The Chief of the High Command, Leader of the High Command, Head of the High Military Command for the Restoration of Order or also known as Head of the Supreme Military Command for Restoring Order (Note: or simply just called Junta Chief, Junta leader, Military leader or Spokesperson) refers to the leading position of the High Military Command for the Restoration of National Security and Public Order, who is the de facto head of state and de facto head of government and with it the de facto leader of Guinea-Bissau; it is currently the highest position in Guinea-Bissau.

== Background ==
A faction of the Revolutionary Armed Forces of the People led by Dinis Incanha has overthrown Umaro Sissoco Embaló on 26 November 2025. In a broadcast on the same day, Dinis Incanha confirmed this and also announced that the military took over and that the borders are closed. Further, he told the public that the High Military Command for the Restoration of National Security and Public Order, a military junta, was established to administer the country for an interim period. Incanha who is the Spokesman and Head of the Military Household, Head of the Presidential Guard and also the Head of the Military Office of the Presidency, became the first Head of the junta.

== Development ==
=== Dinis Incanha's leadership ===
The term of Dinis Incanha lasted only one day; he stepped down from office, and the High Military Command for the Restoration of National Security and Public Order appointed on the same day Horta Inta-A Na Man as his successor and as Transitional President of the country.

=== Horta Inta-A Na Man's leadership ===
After his appointment as Head of the junta, he made clear that he leads the High Command. It was also made clear that he will serve as the transitional president for an interim period of one year. In his first act as the head of the junta and as the transitional president, Inta-A appointed Ilídio Vieira Té, an ally of Embaló and the current finance minister as prime minister. The military junta established the "National Transitional Council" in December 2025. The junta released a transitional charter in December 2025 that banned Horta from running for election. Between 21 January and 22 January 2026, Horta Inta-A Na Man announced a decree authorising elections for the legislature and the presidency to be held on 6 December 2026, after it deemed that "all the conditions for organising free, fair and transparent elections have been met". After the election the High Military Command for the Restoration of National Security and Public Order is planned to be dissolved and with it also the position of the Chief of the High Command.

== List ==
Affiliations

Military

| No. | Portrait | Name (Birth–Death) | Elected | Term of office | | | Political party | President | Prime Minister |
| No. | Portrait | Name (Birth–Death) | Elected | Took office | Left office | Tenure | Political party | President | Prime Minister |
|---|---|---|---|---|---|---|---|---|---|
| 1 | | Brigadier general Dinis Incanha (born 1960) | — | 26 November 2025 | 27 November 2025 | 1 day | Military | Vacant | Camará |
| 2 | | Major general and General; Horta Inta-A Na Man (born c. 1960) (Note: Also Transitional President of Guinea-Bissau.) | – | 27 November 2025 | Incumbent (Note: Announced term end in December 2026.) | 322 days | Military | Himself | Camará; Té |

== See also ==
- Guinea-Bissau:
  - High Military Command for the Restoration of National Security and Public Order
  - President of Guinea-Bissau
  - Prime Minister of Guinea-Bissau
  - Vice President of Guinea-Bissau
- Other states:
  - State Administration Council
  - Chairman of the State Administration Council
