= Artur Silva =

Prime Minister of Guinea-Bissau in 2018

Augusto António Artur da Silva
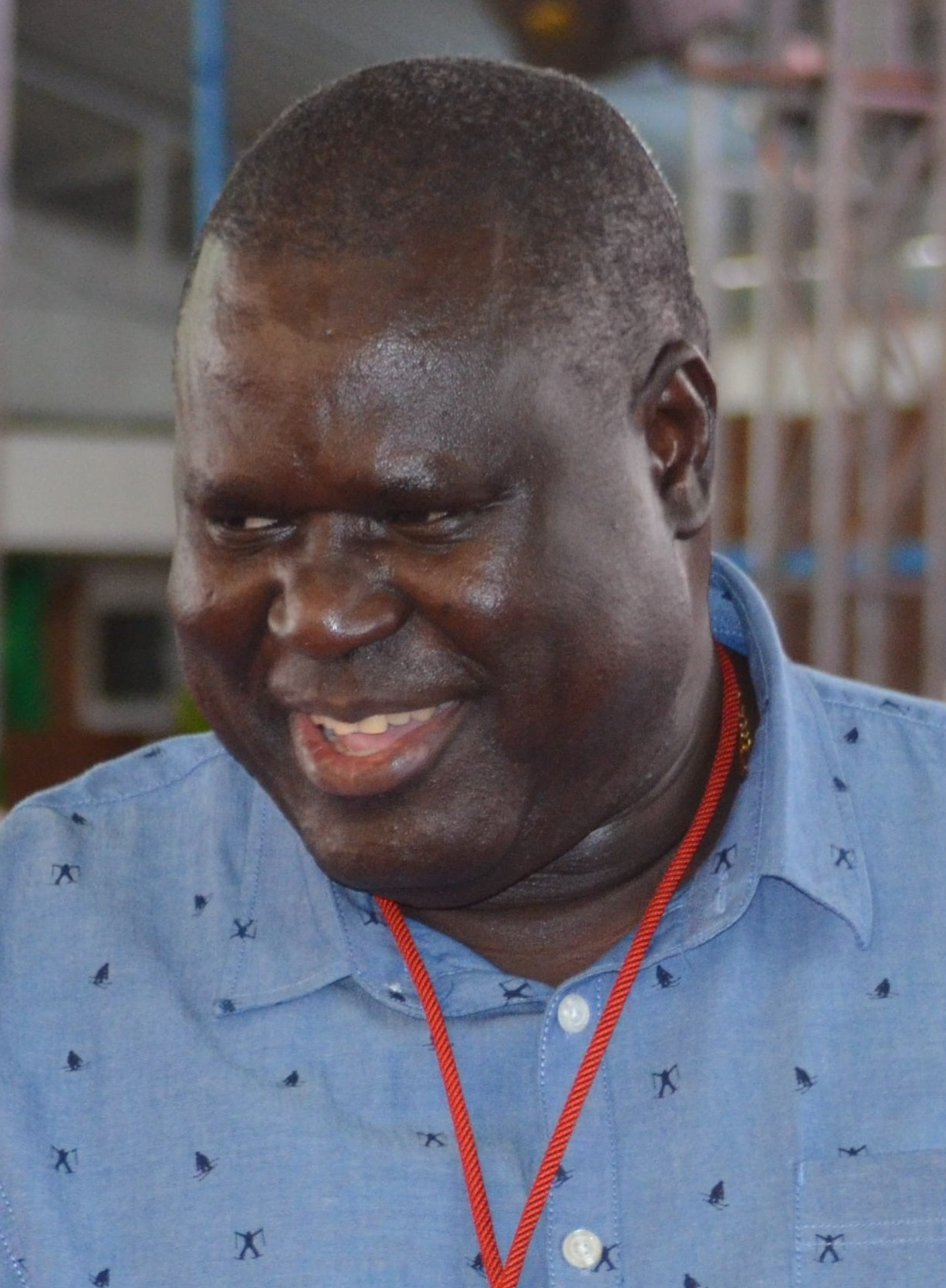

19th Prime Minister of Guinea-Bissau
- In office 30 January 2018 – 16 April 2018
- President: José Mário Vaz
- Preceded by: Umaro Sissoco Embaló
- Succeeded by: Aristides Gomes

Personal details
- Party: PAIGC

Augusto António Artur da Silva (born 1956) is a Bissau-Guinean politician who was the Prime Minister of Guinea-Bissau, appointed by President José Mário Vaz January 30, 2018 to April 16, 2018, to succeed Umaro Sissoco Embaló, who had resigned two weeks earlier.

== Career ==
Artur is a member of the ruling PAIGC Party, and served as education minister in the government of Carlos Gomes Júnior, as well as Foreign Minister. The new Prime Minister's first job will be to organise fresh parliamentary elections in the coming months. But because the PAIGC lost its parliamentary majority, President Vaz sought backing from MPs in the second largest party, the Party of Social Renovation, to secure Silva's appointment.
