= Ilídio Vieira Té =

Prime Minister of Guinea-Bissau since 2025

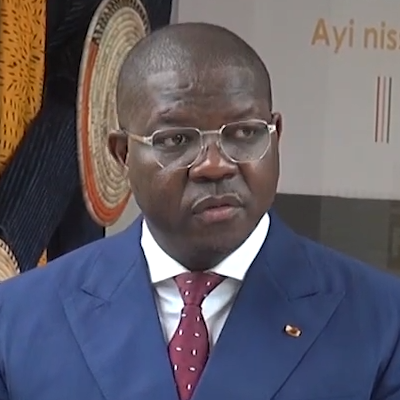
- Té in 2026

24th Prime Minister of Guinea-Bissau
- Incumbent
- Assumed office 28 November 2025
- President: Horta Inta-A Na Man
- Preceded by: Braima Camará

Minister of Finance
- Incumbent
- Assumed office 4 July 2022
- Prime Minister: Nuno Gomes Nabiam; Geraldo João Martins; Rui Duarte de Barros; Braima Camará; Himself
- Preceded by: João Aladje Mamadu Fádia

Personal details
- Born: 5 May 1983 (age 43)
- Party: PRS
- Education: Pablo de Olavide University

Ilídio Vieira Té (born 5 May 1983) is a Bissau-Guinean politician who is currently serving as the 24th prime minister of Guinea-Bissau under President Horta Inta-A Na Man since 2025. A member of the Party for Social Renewal (PRS), he has served as Minister of Finance since 2022.

== Biography ==
Té was born on 5 May 1983. He received a degree in public law in 2007 and later graduated from Pablo de Olavide University in 2009 with a master's degree in intercultural human rights and development. Afterwards, he entered politics, being a member of the Party for Social Renewal and eventually serving for a time as the party's leader. He first worked in the Ministry of Public Service, working as Director of the Administrative Organization Service, and later was Chief of Staff to the Minister of Public Service, Labor and Social Security. From 2018 to 2019, he held the post of Secretary-General of the Ministry of Public Administration, Labor and Administrative Reform. Té later became Secretary of State for the Treasury.

On 4 July 2022, Té was appointed Minister of Finance by President Umaro Sissoco Embaló, replacing João Aladje Mamadu Fádia. He remained Minister of Finance amidst Rui Duarte de Barros, then Braima Camará becoming Prime Minister of Guinea-Bissau. He was elected a member of the National People's Assembly in 2023. Té, considered a close ally of Embaló, served as his campaign director during the 2025 Guinea-Bissau general election. Following the 2025 Guinea-Bissau coup d'état and the ascent of Horta Inta-A Na Man to Transitional President, Té was announced as the new Prime Minister of Guinea-Bissau on 28 November 2025. He retained his post as finance minister after being named prime minister.

Political offices
| Preceded by Braima Camará | Prime Minister of Guinea-Bissau; 2025–present | Incumbent |
