= Braima Camará =

Prime Minister of Guinea-Bissau in 2025

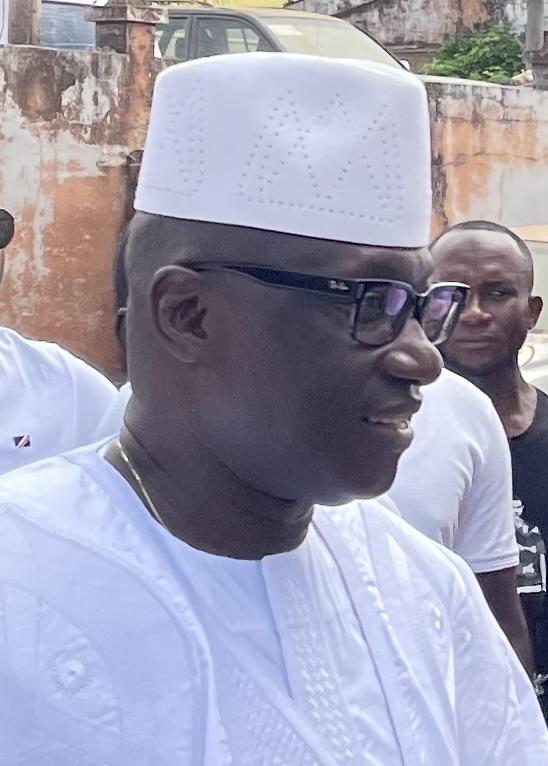
- Camará in 2023

23rd Prime Minister of Guinea-Bissau
- In office 7 August 2025 – 28 November 2025
- President: Umaro Sissoco Embaló; Dinis Incanha (de facto); Horta Inta-A Na Man
- Preceded by: Rui Duarte de Barros
- Succeeded by: Ilídio Vieira Té

Member of the National People's Assembly
- Incumbent
- Assumed office 18 April 2019

Coordinator of Madem G15
- Incumbent
- Assumed office August 2018

Personal details
- Born: 3 August 1968 (age 57) Geba, Guinea-Bissau
- Party: Madem G15

Braima Camará (born 3 August 1968) is a Bissau-Guinean businessman and politician who served as the 23rd Prime Minister of Guinea-Bissau from 7 August 2025 until 28 November 2025, when he was dismissed following a coup d'état. He was a former coordinator of the Madem G15 party.
