= List of presidents of Guinea-Bissau =

President of the Republic of Guinea-Bissau
- Presidente da República da Guiné-Bissau (Portuguese)
- Emblem of Guinea-Bissau

- Presidential flag of Guinea Bissau

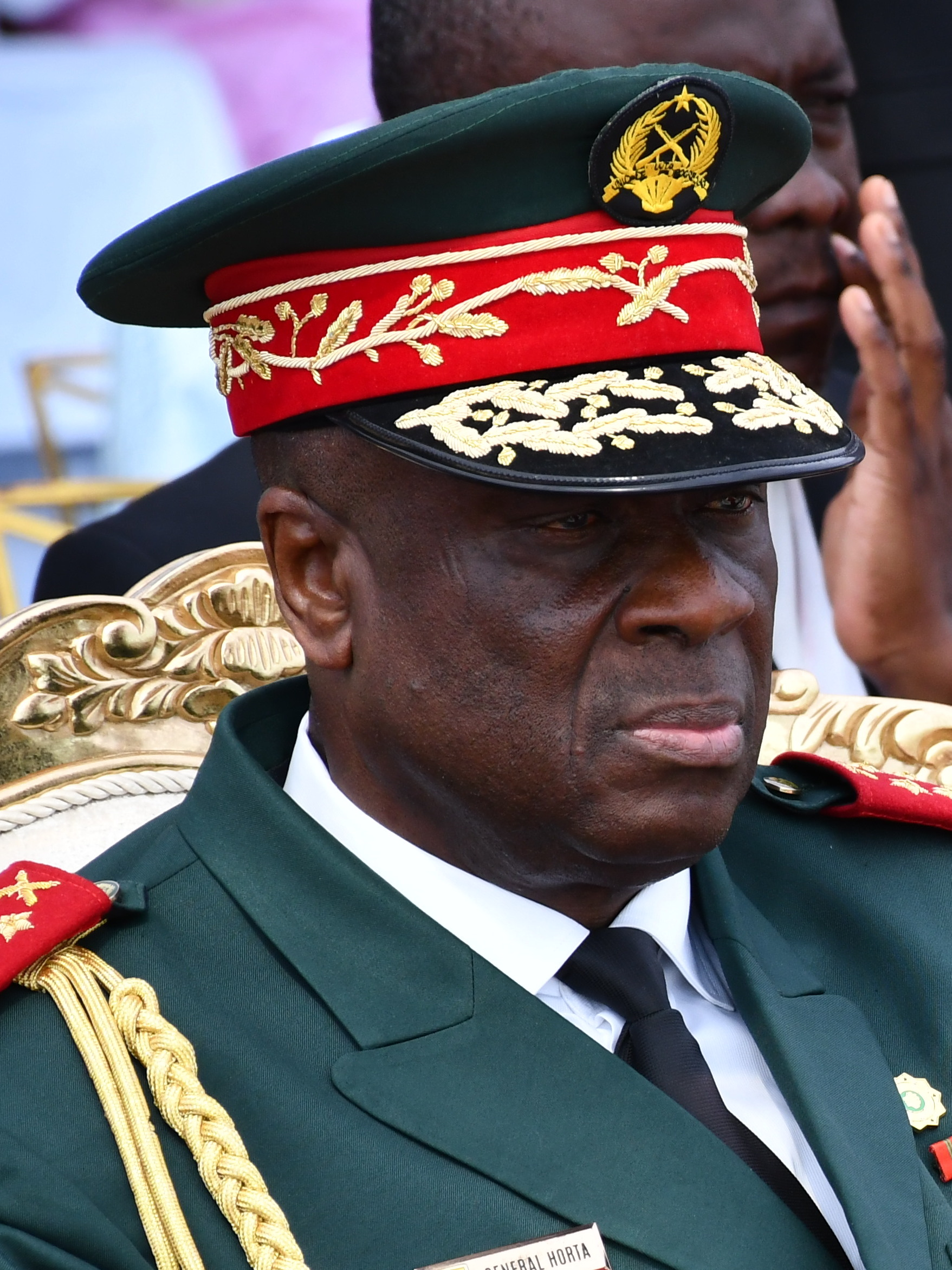
- Incumbent; Horta Inta-A Na Man (Transitional) since 27 November 2025
- Status: Head of state Commander-in-chief
- Residence: Presidential Palace, Bissau
- Appointer: High Military Command for the Restoration of National Security and Public Order (currently)
- Term length: One year (currently)
- Constituting instrument: Transitional Charter (2025)
- Inaugural holder: Luís Cabral
- Formation: 24 September 1973; 52 years ago
- Deputy: None (1991–present) Historical: Vice President of Guinea-Bissau (1973–1991)
- Salary: CFA 3,000,000 or 13342 Int$ annually
- Website: presidencia.gw

This article lists the presidents of Guinea-Bissau, since the establishment of the office of president in 1973.

Since Guinea-Bissau's unilateral declaration of independence from Portugal on 24 September 1973, there have been six presidents, six acting presidents and five interim military leaders. The current transitional president is General Horta Inta-A Na Man, who was appointed on 27 November 2025 following a coup d'état.

== Term limits ==
As of 2021, there is a two-term limit for the president in the Constitution of Guinea-Bissau. The term limit has not been met by any president yet.

== List of officeholders ==
Political parties

African Party for the Independence of Guinea and Cape Verde (PAIGC)
Party for Social Renewal (PRS)
Movement for Democratic Alternation, Group of 15 (Madem G15)

Other affiliations

Military
Independent

Symbols

Denotes acting president

Symbols

^{†} Died in office

| No. | Portrait | Name (Birth–Death) | Elected | Term of office | | | Political party |
| No. | Portrait | Name (Birth–Death) | Elected | Took office | Left office | Tenure | Political party |
|---|---|---|---|---|---|---|---|
| 1 | | Luís Cabral (1931–2009); Chairman of the Council of State (Note: In exile in Conakry, Guinea until 19 October 1974.) | 1976–77 | 24 September 1973 | 14 November 1980 (Deposed in a coup) | 7 years, 51 days | PAIGC |
| 2 | | João Bernardo Vieira (1939–2009); Chairman of the Council of the Revolution | — | 14 November 1980 | 14 May 1984 | 3 years, 182 days | Military / PAIGC |
| — | | Carmen Pereira (1937–2016); Acting Chairwoman of the Council of State | — | 14 May 1984 | 16 May 1984 | 2 days | PAIGC |
| (2) | | João Bernardo Vieira (1939–2009); Chairman of the Council of State | 1984; 1989; 1994 | 16 May 1984 | 10 May 1999 (Deposed in a coup) | 14 years, 359 days | PAIGC |
| (2) | | President of the Republic from 29 September 1994 | 1984; 1989; 1994 | 16 May 1984 | 10 May 1999 (Deposed in a coup) | 14 years, 359 days | PAIGC |
| — | | Brigadier general Ansumane Mané (c. 1940–2000); Chairman of the Supreme Command of the Military Junta | — | 7 May 1999 | 14 May 1999 | 7 days | Military |
| — | | Malam Bacai Sanhá (1947–2012); Acting president | — | 14 May 1999 | 17 February 2000 | 279 days | PAIGC |
| 3 | | Kumba Yala (1953–2014) | 1999–2000 | 17 February 2000 | 14 September 2003 (Deposed in a coup) | 3 years, 209 days | PRS |
| — | | General; Veríssimo Correia Seabra (1947–2004); Chairman of the Military Committee for the Restoration of Constitutional and Democratic Order | — | 14 September 2003 | 28 September 2003 | 14 days | Military |
| — | | Henrique Rosa (1946–2013); Acting president | — | 28 September 2003 | 1 October 2005 | 2 years, 3 days | Independent |
| (2) | | João Bernardo Vieira (1939–2009) | 2005 | 1 October 2005 | 2 March 2009 (Assassinated) | 3 years, 152 days | Independent |
| — | | Raimundo Pereira (born 1956); Acting president | — | 3 March 2009 | 8 September 2009 | 189 days | PAIGC |
| 4 | | Malam Bacai Sanhá (1947–2012) | 2009 | 8 September 2009 | 9 January 2012^{[†]} | 2 years, 123 days | PAIGC |
| — | | Raimundo Pereira (born 1956); Acting president | — | 9 January 2012 | 12 April 2012 (Deposed in a coup) | 94 days | PAIGC |
| — | | Major general Mamadu Ture Kuruma (born 1947); Chairman of the Military Command | — | 12 April 2012 | 11 May 2012 | 29 days | Military |
| — | | Manuel Serifo Nhamadjo (1958–2020); Acting president | — | 11 May 2012 | 23 June 2014 | 2 years, 43 days | Independent |
| 5 | | José Mário Vaz (born 1957) | 2014 | 23 June 2014 | 27 February 2020 | 5 years, 249 days | PAIGC (Until 2015) |
| | | José Mário Vaz (born 1957) | 2014 | 23 June 2014 | 27 February 2020 | 5 years, 249 days | Independent (From 2015) |
| — | | Cipriano Cassamá (born 1959); Acting president | — | 27 June 2019 | 29 June 2019 | 2 days | PAIGC |
| 6 | | Umaro Sissoco Embaló (born 1972) | 2019 | 27 February 2020 | 26 November 2025 (Deposed in a coup) | 5 years, 272 days | Madem G15 |
| — | | Brigadier general Dinis Incanha (born 1960); Chief of the High Command (Note: The office of president was vacant, however Incanha was the de facto head of state during the time as Chief of the High Command.) | — | 26 November 2025 | 27 November 2025 | 1 day | Military |
| — | | General; Horta Inta-A Na Man (born c. 1960); Transitional president (Note: In his capacity as Chief of the High Command.) | — | 27 November 2025 | Incumbent (Note: Announced term end in December 2026.) | 288 days | Military |

== Latest election ==
| Candidate | Party | First round | | Second round | |
| Candidate | Party | Votes | % | Votes | % |
|---|---|---|---|---|---|
| Domingos Simões Pereira | African Party for the Independence of Guinea and Cape Verde | 222,870 | 40.13 | 254,468 | 46.45 |
| Umaro Sissoco Embaló | Madem G15 | 153,530 | 27.65 | 293,359 | 53.55 |
| Nuno Gomes Nabiam | Assembly of the People United | 73,063 | 13.16 | | |
| José Mário Vaz | Independent | 68,933 | 12.41 | | |
| Carlos Gomes Júnior | Independent | 14,766 | 2.66 | | |
| Baciro Djá | Patriotic Front of National Salvation | 7,126 | 1.28 | | |
| Vicente Fernandes | Democratic Convergence Party | 4,250 | 0.77 | | |
| Mamadú Iaia Djaló | New Democracy Party | 2,813 | 0.51 | | |
| Idrissa Djaló | National Unity Party | 2,569 | 0.46 | | |
| Mutaro Intai Djabi | Independent | 2,385 | 0.43 | | |
| Gabriel Fernando Indi | United Social Democratic Party | 1,982 | 0.36 | | |
| António Afonso Té | Republican Party for Independence and Development | 1,061 | 0.19 | | |
| Total | | 555,348 | 100.00 | 547,827 | 100.00 |
| Valid votes | | 555,348 | 98.04 | 547,827 | 98.97 |
| Invalid/blank votes | | 11,125 | 1.96 | 5,694 | 1.03 |
| Total votes | | 566,473 | 100.00 | 553,521 | 100.00 |
| Registered voters/turnout | | 761,676 | 74.37 | 761,676 | 72.67 |
Source: CNE, CNE

== See also ==
- Politics of Guinea-Bissau
- List of captains-major of Bissau
- List of captains-major of Cacheu
- List of governors of Portuguese Guinea
- List of prime ministers of Guinea-Bissau
- Vice President of Guinea-Bissau
