= Constitution of Guinea-Bissau =

Basic law governing Guinea-Bissau

The Constitution of Guinea-Bissau is the basic law governing Guinea-Bissau. It was adopted in 1984 as a communist state constitution, came into force on 6 May 1984, and revised in 1991, 1993 and 1996 following democratization. After the coup d'état on 26 November 2025, the constitution was suspended and replaced with a transitional charter. A constitutional referendum on 30 August 2026 was held, where the people of Guinea-Bissau could vote for a new constitution. The majority voted for the new constitution.
