= 2025 Guinea-Bissau coup d'état =

- Part of the Coup Belt
Date	26 November 2025
Location	Bissau, Guinea-Bissau 11.864°N 15.585°W
Result	Coup d'état successful; Umaro Sissoco Embaló is overthrown as president and arrested before going to Senegal; Revolutionary Armed Forces of the People announce a takeover of the government and establish the High Military Command for the Restoration of National Security and Public Order; Horta Inta-A Na Man proclaimed as interim president

Belligerents
Revolutionary Armed Forces of the People (factions); Presidential guard	Government of Guinea-Bissau; President of the Republic of Guinea-Bissau; Revolutionary Armed Forces of the People (factions)
Madem G15 (faction)	PAIGC; PRS; Madem G15 (faction)

Commanders and leaders
Dinis Incanha; Horta Inta-A Na Man	Umaro Sissoco Embaló; (Guinea-Bissau) Botche Candé; Biague Na Ntan; Mamadou Touré; Domingos Pereira; Fernando Dias

Strength
Unknown	Unknown

Casualties and losses
Unknown	Unknown
- Location within Guinea-Bissau

On 26 November 2025, the president of Guinea-Bissau, Umaro Sissoco Embaló, was arrested as part of a coup d'état carried out by Head of the Military Office of the Presidency Brigadier General Dinis Incanha. Military officers declared "total control" over the country and established the High Military Command for the Restoration of National Security and Public Order led by General Horta Inta-A Na Man. The coup occurred a day before the results of the 2025 Guinea-Bissau general election held on 23 November, in which Embaló was running for reelection, were expected to be officially announced.

== Background ==
General elections were held in Guinea-Bissau on 23 November 2025 to elect the president and members of the National People's Assembly. Civil society groups and other observers questioned the vote's credibility after the main opposition party, the PAIGC, was barred from contesting the presidential election. ECOWAS had withdrawn its observer mission after being threatened with expulsion several months prior. African Union observers, however, were present. Both the incumbent president, Umaro Sissoco Embaló, and opposition candidate Fernando Dias da Costa claimed victory in the presidential election. The coup occurred while official results of the vote were yet to be released on 27 November.

This is the ninth coup or attempted coup in Guinea-Bissau since it gained independence from Portugal in 1974, with the last successful coup being in 2012; the two most recent coup attempts, in 2022 and 2023, also targeted Embaló, while there were also allegations of a coup plot at the end of October 2025. The last coup attempt in 2023 prompted him to dissolve the Assembly and rule by decree, although critics had accused him of manufacturing crises as an excuse to crack down on the opposition.

== Coup ==
On 26 November 2025, the day before the expected official election result was to be announced, gunfire was heard outside the presidential palace in the capital Bissau, with men in military uniform seen taking over the main road leading to the building. Shooting was also heard at the interior ministry, and at the National Electoral Commission, forcing hundreds to flee the affected areas. A spokesperson for President Embaló accused gunmen affiliated with Fernando Dias of attacking the electoral commission to prevent the release of the election results. Former prime minister and head of PAIGC, Domingos Simões Pereira, who supported Dias and was accompanying him in a meeting with election observers when news of the violence broke out, accused Embaló of trying to simulate a coup so that he could declare an emergency after determining that he had lost the election.

Later that day, President Embaló told Jeune Afrique that he had been arrested without force at his office at 13:00 GMT in a "coup d'état" led by Head of the Military Office of the Presidency Brigadier General Dinis Incanha. Embaló was subsequently reported to have been detained at general-staff headquarters and was being "well-treated". Several officials were also arrested, including armed forces chief of general staff General Biague Na Ntan, his deputy, General Mamadou Touré, and interior minister Botche Candé. Dias and Simões Pereira were arrested as well. However, Dias later said he had managed to escape and vowed to resist the coup. Dias later fled to the Nigerian embassy and was granted protection by the Nigerian government. An international election monitor also said the head of the electoral commission had been arrested, with the commission's headquarters also having been sealed off by the military. Soldiers from the presidential guard and an elite gendarmerie unit secured the presidential palace.

At the army headquarters, military officers, led by a spokesman and head of the military household at the presidential palace, Brigadier General Dinis Incanha, issued a statement on state television announcing that they had taken "total control" over the country, and ordered the suspension of all political institutions and media outlets, the electoral process, the closure of international borders, and an indefinite overnight curfew. The officers announced the formation of the "High Military Command for the Restoration of National Security and Public Order" composed of all branches of the armed forces that would lead the country until further notice and urged citizens to remain calm. It was also reported that the army was trying to cut off the country's internet access. Incanha also said the coup had been launched in response to "the discovery of an ongoing plan" orchestrated by politicians and other domestic and foreign figures along with a "well-known drug lord" aimed at destabilizing the country by attempting to "manipulate electoral results".

On 27 November, the High Military Command proclaimed army chief of staff General Horta Inta-A Na Man as head of a military government that would oversee a one-year transition period. In the evening, the government of Senegal announced Embaló's arrival in the country, adding that it had negotiated with figures in Guinea-Bissau for his release and chartered an aircraft to transport him. The Senegalese Foreign Ministry affirmed that Embaló was "safe and sound". Embalo relocated to the Republic of the Congo shortly afterwards.

On 28 November, the High Military Command appointed finance minister Ilídio Vieira Té, the campaign director of Embalo's Madem G15 party in the recent election, as prime minister. His cabinet was introduced the next day.

On 2 December, the National Electoral Commission said it was unable to publish the election results after armed men wearing balaclavas confiscated computers from 45 staff and destroyed all tally sheets except those from Bissau and the main computer server storing the results.

On 4 December, the High Military Command announced the formation of a National Transitional Council and said it would draft a Transitional Charter to replace the Judicial Council. The charter was published on 9 December. Among its provisions were a ban on Inta-a and Vieira Té from participating in future elections.

On 22 January 2026, the High Military Command issued a decree authorising elections for the legislature and the presidency to be held on 6 December 2026, after it deemed that "all the conditions for organising free, fair and transparent elections have been met".

== Reactions ==
=== Domestic ===
The PAIGC called for protests against the coup and for the release of the election results. On 29 November, the party said its headquarters in Bissau was "illegally invaded by heavily armed militia groups". while clashes broke out between young people and police in the capital's suburbs. Protests were held demanding the release of Domingos Simões Pereira and the election results, while three civil society groups called for a general strike and a civil disobedience campaign to restore "electoral truth". Pereira was finally released on 30 January 2026 but was placed under house arrest. That same day, Dias was allowed to leave the Nigerian embassy. Both politicians refused offers by the junta to take part in the transitional government.

The Popular Front, a civil society coalition in Guinea-Bissau, accused Embaló and the army of staging a "simulated coup" to prevent the release of election results and remain in power for Embaló to name a new president and prime minister that would hold new elections in which he could run again for president. Similar beliefs were expressed by Fernando Dias da Costa.

=== International ===
United Nations Secretary-General António Guterres issued an appeal for "all national stakeholders in Guinea-Bissau to exercise restraint and respect the rule of law". In a joint statement, election observers from ECOWAS and the African Union said they "deplore this blatant attempt to disrupt the democratic process" and requested that both organizations "take the necessary steps to restore constitutional order." The AU condemned the coup and urged the immediate and unconditional release of Embalo and other detained officials. On 27 November, ECOWAS suspended Guinea-Bissau's membership in the bloc, The AU followed suit the next day. ECOWAS deployed a delegation led by Sierra Leonean president Julius Maada Bio to Bissau to negotiate with the military on a return to constitutional order and the completion of the electoral process.

Portugal, Guinea-Bissau's former colonial power, urged "all parties involved to refrain from any institutional or civic violence" and "to restore the regular functioning of institutions to allow the completion of the vote count and the announcement of the election results." The coup was also condemned by South Africa and France.

Senegalese Prime Minister Ousmane Sonko questioned the authenticity of the coup, calling it a "sham" and urging the release of the arrested opposition politicians and the election results. It was reported that Embalo had been upset at Sonko's statements, resulting in his departure to the Republic of the Congo. Former Nigerian president Goodluck Jonathan, who was serving as an election observer in Guinea-Bissau at the time of the coup, reflected those concerns, calling it a "ceremonial coup" and questioning why Embaló was the first to announce his own overthrow rather than the coup leaders, in contrast with other coups in the region.

Russian Foreign Ministry spokesperson Maria Zakharova stated that Russia is closely monitoring the situation in Guinea-Bissau and called on political forces to exercise restraint.

== See also ==
- List of coups and coup attempts by country § Guinea-Bissau
