= 2013 Chadian coup attempt =

2013 attempt to overthrow President Idriss Déby

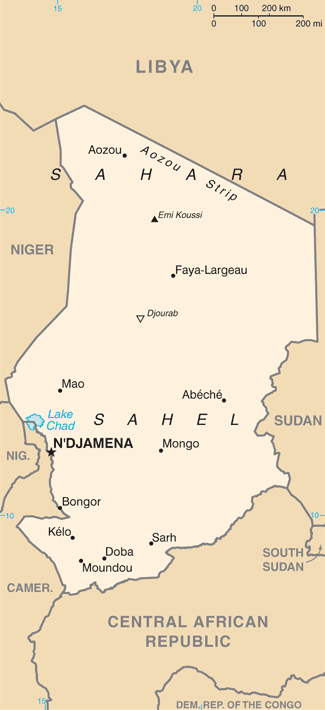
Map of Chad.

The 2013 Chadian coup d'état attempt was an attempted coup d'état against Chadian President Idriss Déby.

Clashes in military barracks to the east of the capital N'Djamena, as well as in residential areas in the capital, occurred on the afternoon of May 1. During the clashes, which lasted for one day, between four and eight people were killed.

Moussa Tao Mahamat, a former rebel leader, was accused of being the leader of the coup d'état attempt. He was arrested one day after the unsuccessful coup attempt.

Following its conclusion, four MPs, two generals, one journalist, and several members of military were arrested on charges of participating in the coup attempt.
