= Dinis Incanha =

Bissau-Guinean military officer

Brigadier General Dinis Incanha

Chief of the High Command
- In office 26 November 2025 – 27 November 2025
- President: Vacant
- Prime Minister: Braima Camará
- Preceded by: Office established Umaro Sissoco Embaló (as President)
- Succeeded by: Horta Inta-A Na Man

Head of the Military Office of the Presidency
- Incumbent
- Assumed office 24 February 2021
- President: Umaro Sissoco Embaló; Vacant; Horta Inta-A Na Man (transitional)
- Preceded by: António Abel

Personal details
- Born: 15 August 1960 (age 65)

Military service
- Allegiance: Guinea-Bissau
- Branch/service: Revolutionary Armed Forces of the People
- Rank: Brigadier general

Dinis Incanha (Note: Also spelled N'Tchama and N'Canha.) (born 15 August 1960) is a Bissau-Guinean brigadier general who led the 2025 coup d'état becoming the Chief of the High Military Command for the Restoration of National Security and Public Order afterwards. Before the coup, he served as the head of the military office of the presidency. He was Guinea-Bissau's de facto leader as Spokesperson of the military junta for a day from 26 to 27 November 2025 after leading the coup d'état, becoming the shortest-serving head of state in Bissau-Guinean history.

He was appointed the presidency's military office head (Portuguese: Chefe da Casa Militar da Presidência) in February 2021 replacing General António Abel. He was a colonel then but was later promoted to brigadier general.

In a televised announcement on 26 November 2025, Incanha announced that the military had taken "total control" of the country and had arrested President Umaro Sissoco Embaló, as well as other leaders, and announced the establishment of the High Military Command for the Restoration of National Security and Public Order. He stated that it would rule the country until further notice and appealed for calm among the populace. Incanha suspended all political institutions and media outlets and the electoral process, closed international borders, and imposed an indefinite overnight curfew.

On 27 November 2025, he presided over the investiture ceremony of General Horta Inta-A Na Man as Transitional President of Guinea-Bissau and Chief of the High Military Command for the Restoration of National Security and Public Order.

== 2025 coup d'état and leadership ==
On 26 November 2025, just as the general election results were about to be announced, gunshots were heard in Bissau near the Presidential Palace. Incanha then appeared on state television with a group of officers confirming that a coup has happened, with President Embaló being overthrown and subsequently arrested. In his speech, Incanha said that the coup happened due to plans to "destabilise Guinea-Bissau" made by politicians, domestic and foreign figures, and a "well-known drug lord".

A few hours later, Incanha and the other officers then announced the formation of the High Military Command for the Restoration of National Security and Public Order, with Incanha becoming its chief and thus the country's de facto leader. However, a day after the coup on 27 November, Incanha stepped down and handed over power to General Horta Inta-A Na Man. Incanha thus became the shortest-serving leader in Bissau-Guinean history, and also subsequently retained his role as the head of the military office of the presidency.

== Notes ==
Political offices
Preceded by Umaro Sissoco Embaló as President	Chief of the High Command; 2025	Succeeded by Horta Inta-A Na Man as Transitional President and Chief of the High Command
