= Horta Inta-A Na Man =

Transitional President of Guinea-Bissau since 2025

Major general and General Horta Inta-A Na Man
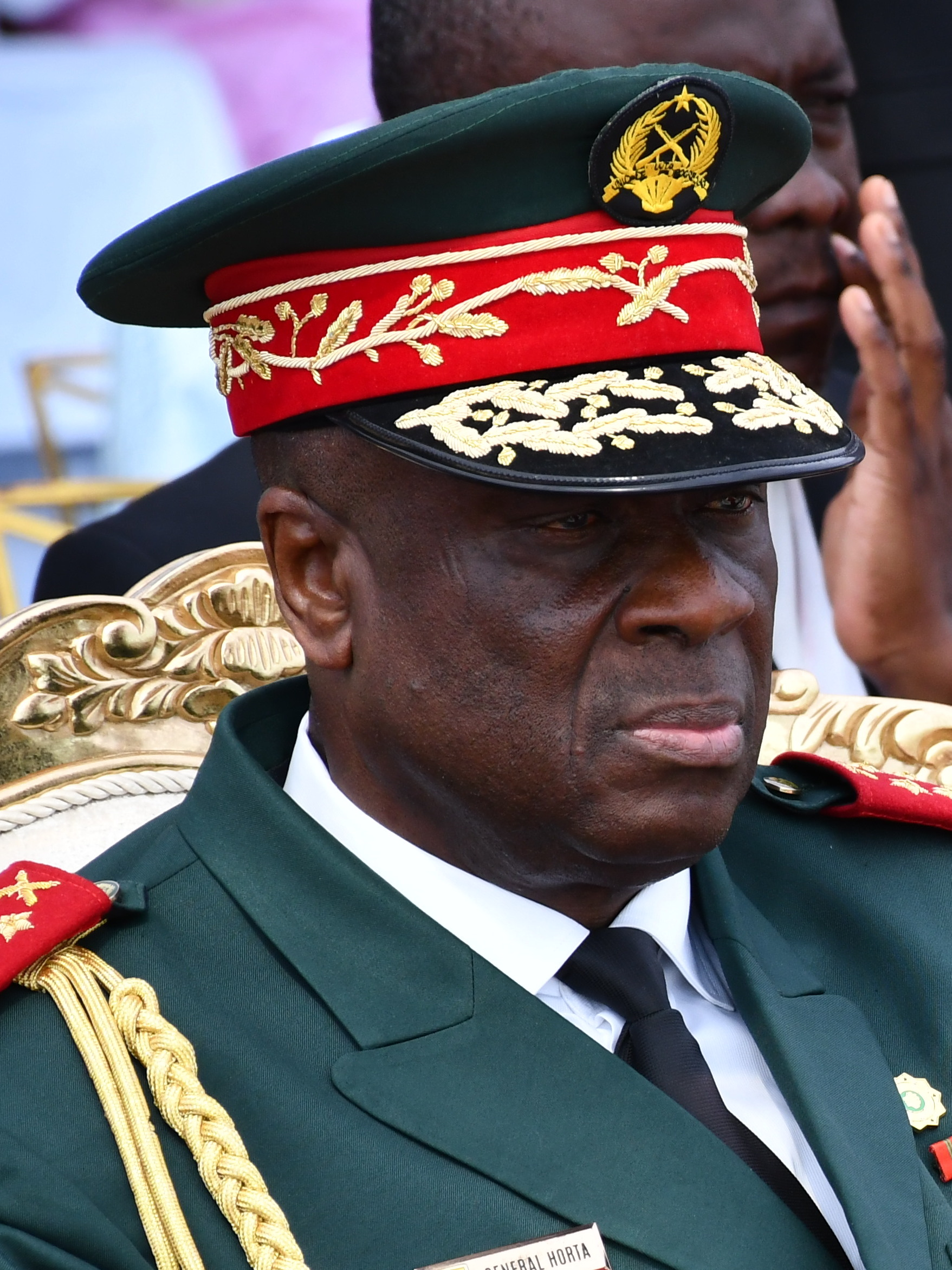
- Inta-A in 2026

Transitional President of Guinea-Bissau (Note: In his capacity as Chief of the High Command.)
- Incumbent
- Assumed office 27 November 2025
- Prime Minister: Braima Camará; Ilídio Vieira Té
- Leader: Himself
- Preceded by: Umaro Sissoco Embaló (as President)

Chief of the High Command
- Incumbent
- Assumed office 27 November 2025
- President: Himself
- Prime Minister: Braima Camará; Ilídio Vieira Té
- Preceded by: Dinis Incanha

Chief of General Staff of the Revolutionary Armed Forces of the People
- In office 2023 – 27 November 2025 (Note: Serving together with General Biague Na Ntan.)
- President: Umaro Sissoco Embaló; Vacant
- Succeeded by: Tomas Djassi

Personal details
- Born: c. 1960 (age 65–66)

Military service
- Allegiance: Guinea-Bissau
- Branch/service: Revolutionary Armed Forces of the People
- Rank: General; Major general

Horta Inta-A Na Man (Note: Also spelled N'Tam and N'Ta.) (born c. 1960) is a Bissau-Guinean military officer and politician who has served as the transitional president of Guinea-Bissau and Chief of the High Military Command for the Restoration of National Security and Public Order since the 2025 coup d'état.

He was born in the 1960s to a family from the Balanta ethnic group. He attended a Soviet military school, and he wears a badge on his uniform from his time in the Soviet Union.

He was the commander of a battalion of the Presidential Guard, and helped defend then-president Umaro Sissoco Embaló from a coup-attempt in February 2022. He was then promoted to Brigadier General and made the commander of the National Guard, a position he held until June 2023, when he was promoted to Major General.

Between 2023 and 2025 he was the chief of general staff of the Revolutionary Armed Forces of the People, the military of Guinea-Bissau.

As transitional president, he has installed a 27-person government, led by Prime Minister Ilídio Vieira Té, the former Finance Minister under Embaló.

== Coup and presidency (2025–present) ==
On 26 November 2025, Inta-A participated in the coup that deposed President Umaro Sissoco Embaló which was led by Brigadier General Dinis Incanha. The formation of the High Military Command for the Restoration of National Security and Public Order was announced with Incanha becoming its chief, and thus Guinea-Bissau's de facto leader. The following day, Incanha stepped down and Inta-A was appointed and subsequently sworn in as transitional president, and thus became the new head of the military junta.

In his first act as transitional president and as head of the junta, Inta-A appointed Ilídio Vieira Té, an ally of Embaló and the current finance minister as prime minister.

He proclaimed on 5 December 2025 that there will be zero tolerance in the fight against drug dealers.

On 22 January 2026, Inta-A announced a decree authorising elections for the legislature and the presidency to be held on 6 December 2026, after it deemed that "all the conditions for organising free, fair and transparent elections have been met".

On 4 March 2026 Inta-A met with Bishop of Roman Catholic Diocese of Bafatá, Víctor Luís Quematcha.

On 11 March 2026, the transitional government set price control for nuts. Inta-A said he wants the 2026 cashew campaign to be “the ultimate opportunity for the valorisation” of the product.

In late March the body of anti-military junta activist Vigario Luis Balanta of the Po di Terra movement was found lifeless in a rice feld, due this protests started against the military junta, the protesters claim that the military junta is behind the death of Balanta. It has been speculated that Umaro Sissoco Embaló might be installed as President, to stop the protests.

On 10 August 2026, Inta-A had his first foreign trip, the first country he visited was Republic of Chad.

On 30 August 2026, Inta voted in the constitutional referendum.

== Notes ==
Political offices
Preceded by Dinis Incanha as Chief of the High Command; Umaro Sissoco Embaló as President	Transitional President of Guinea-Bissau and Chief of the High Command; 2025–present	Incumbent
