= Umaro Sissoco Embaló =

President of Guinea-Bissau from 2020 to 2025

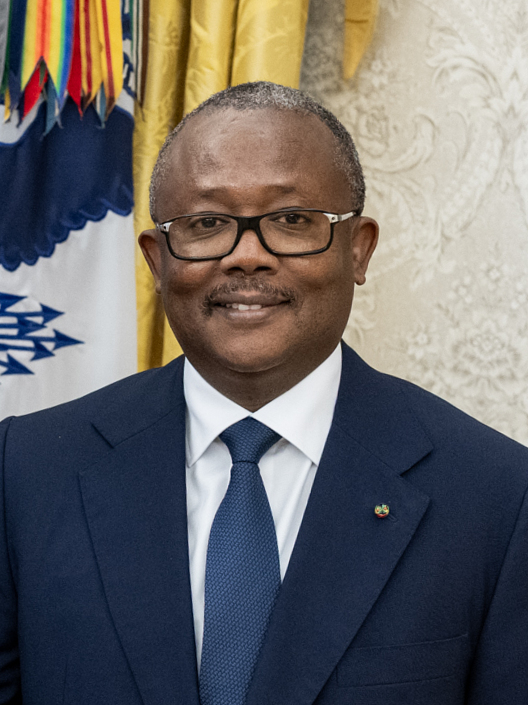
- Embaló in 2025

6th President of Guinea-Bissau
- In office 27 February 2020 – 26 November 2025
- Prime Minister: Nuno Gomes Nabiam; Geraldo Martins; Rui Duarte de Barros; Braima Camará
- Preceded by: José Mário Vaz
- Succeeded by: Horta Inta-A Na Man (Note: Office vacant between 26–27 November 2025.)

18th Prime Minister of Guinea-Bissau
- In office 18 November 2016 – 16 January 2018
- President: José Mário Vaz
- Preceded by: Baciro Djá
- Succeeded by: Artur Silva

Personal details
- Born: Umaro Mokhtar Sissoco Embaló; 23 September 1972 (age 54) Bissau, Portuguese Guinea
- Party: Madem G15 (since 2018)
- Other political affiliations: PAIGC (2016–2018)
- Spouse: Dinisia Reis Embaló
- Education: Technical University of Lisbon; Complutense University

Military service
- Allegiance: Guinea-Bissau
- Branch/service: Revolutionary Armed Forces of the People
- Rank: Brigadier

Umaro Mokhtar Sissoco Embaló (born 23 September 1972) is a Bissau-Guinean politician and former military officer who served as the sixth president of Guinea-Bissau from 2020 until he was deposed in a coup d'état in 2025. A member of the Madem G15 party, Embaló served as the 18th prime minister under President José Mário Vaz from 2016 to 2018.

Born to a Muslim Fula family in Bissau, Embaló was educated at the Technical University of Lisbon in Portugal and the Complutense University of Madrid in Spain, graduating from both universities with a bachelor's degree in political science and a doctorate in international relations from the Complutense University. Embaló then joined the Bissau-Guinean Army and underwent training in Belgium, Israel, South Africa, Japan, and France. Before his political career, Embaló taught in African and Middle-Eastern affairs and in matters of defence, international co-operation and development.

In 2016, Embaló entered politics and joined the African Party for the Independence of Guinea and Cape Verde (PAIGC), the then ruling party. Later in that year he was appointed prime minister by President Vaz. During this time, a dispute between Embaló and the PAIGV grew to the point that two years later in 2018, he left the party and formed the Madem G15 party and also resigned as prime minister. In the November 2019 presidential election, Embaló ran for president and won the election. He was sworn in as president in February of the following year.

During his presidency, Guinea-Bissau saw the retreat of Economic Community of West African States (ECOWAS) troops stationed in the country after the 2012 coup and attempted to arrange official visits from foreign heads of government, including the first visit from the Portuguese government in three decades, and international organisations such as the International Monetary Fund. In 2022, Embaló survived a coup attempt, labelling the attempt as a "threat to democracy". Despite this however, opposition figures criticised Embaló's rule as increasingly authoritarian, as Embaló dissolved parliaments which were dominated by the opposition twice during his presidency; one in 2022, and another in 2023, following clashes between government forces and the National Guard, during which the opposition criticised Embaló for attempting to carry a constitutional coup and consolidate power.

In September 2024, Embaló said that he will not run for re-election. However, two months later in November, Embaló said that he would remain president beyond 2030 after calls from supporters to remain in office. In March 2025, Embaló stated that he would run for re-election. However, the opposition criticised the expiration of his term as it was originally set to end on 27 February 2025; however, the Constitutional Court set it to 4 September, in which Embaló remained in office way beyond that date. Elections were held in November 2025, around one year after the original date, with both Embaló and the opposition Independent candidate Fernando Dias da Costa declaring victory.

On 26 November 2025, hours before the official results of the general election were announced, a coup occurred with officers from the Revolutionary Armed Forces of the People seizing power and subsequently detaining Embaló. He thus became the fourth president to be deposed in a coup, after Luís Cabral, João Bernardo Vieira, and Kumba Yala, and was also the second president to not come from the PAIGC party, after Kumba Yala. Throughout his presidency, Embaló stated that his governing style is that of "Embaloism", which he defines as "order, discipline, and development", asserting that "there is neither small state nor small president" and has compared himself to leaders like Lee Kuan Yew and Rodrigo Duterte.

== Life ==
Born in Bissau to a Muslim Fula family, Embaló holds a degree in international relations from the Higher Institute of Social and Political Sciences at the Technical University of Lisbon, as well as both a Master's degree in political science and a doctorate in international relations from the Complutense University of Madrid. He is fluent in Portuguese and Spanish, and competent in English, French, Arabic and Swahili.

Embaló served in the army, undertaking National Defence Studies at the National Defence Centre of Spain, and underwent further studies on National Security in Belgium, Israel, South Africa, Japan, and France. He rose to the rank of brigadier-general. Before his political career, Embaló academically specialised in African and Middle-Eastern affairs and in matters of defence, international co-operation and development. He is a former Minister of African Affairs.

== Premiership (2016–2018) ==
Embaló formed his cabinet on 13 December 2016 after having been appointed prime minister by President José Mário Vaz on 18 November 2016.

However, Embaló took the post while under the censure of his own party, the African Party for the Independence of Guinea and Cape Verde (PAIGC), which through its Central Committee gave him a vote of distrust of one hundred and twelve votes in favour and eleven against on 26 November 2016.

As head of government, he could only count on the support of the Social Renovation Party, which had the second largest number of seats in the National People's Congress of Guinea-Bissau.

On 13 January 2018, after disagreements with President José Mário Vaz, he was replaced according to the demands of João Fadiá (minister of finance) and Botche Candé (minister of the interior), Embaló offered his resignation from the position, effective on 16 January 2018.

== 2019 presidential election ==
Embaló ran for president in 2019, running as the candidate of Madem G15. He finished in second place, with 27% of the vote, in the first round of voting. According to the preliminary and final results published by the national commission of elections, he won the runoff vote against another former prime minister, Domingos Simões Pereira, 54% to 46%. However, the final results continue to be disputed by his opponent Domingos Simões Pereira. Although neither the supreme court of Guinea-Bissau nor the parliament had given its approval for the official swearing-in ceremony, Sissoco Embaló had organised an alternative swearing-in ceremony in a hotel in Bissau to announce himself as legal president of Guinea-Bissau. Several politicians in Guinea-Bissau, including Prime Minister Aristides Gomes, accused Sissoco Embaló of arranging a coup d'état, although outgoing president Mário Vaz stepped down to allow Embaló to assume power.

== Presidency (2020–2025) ==
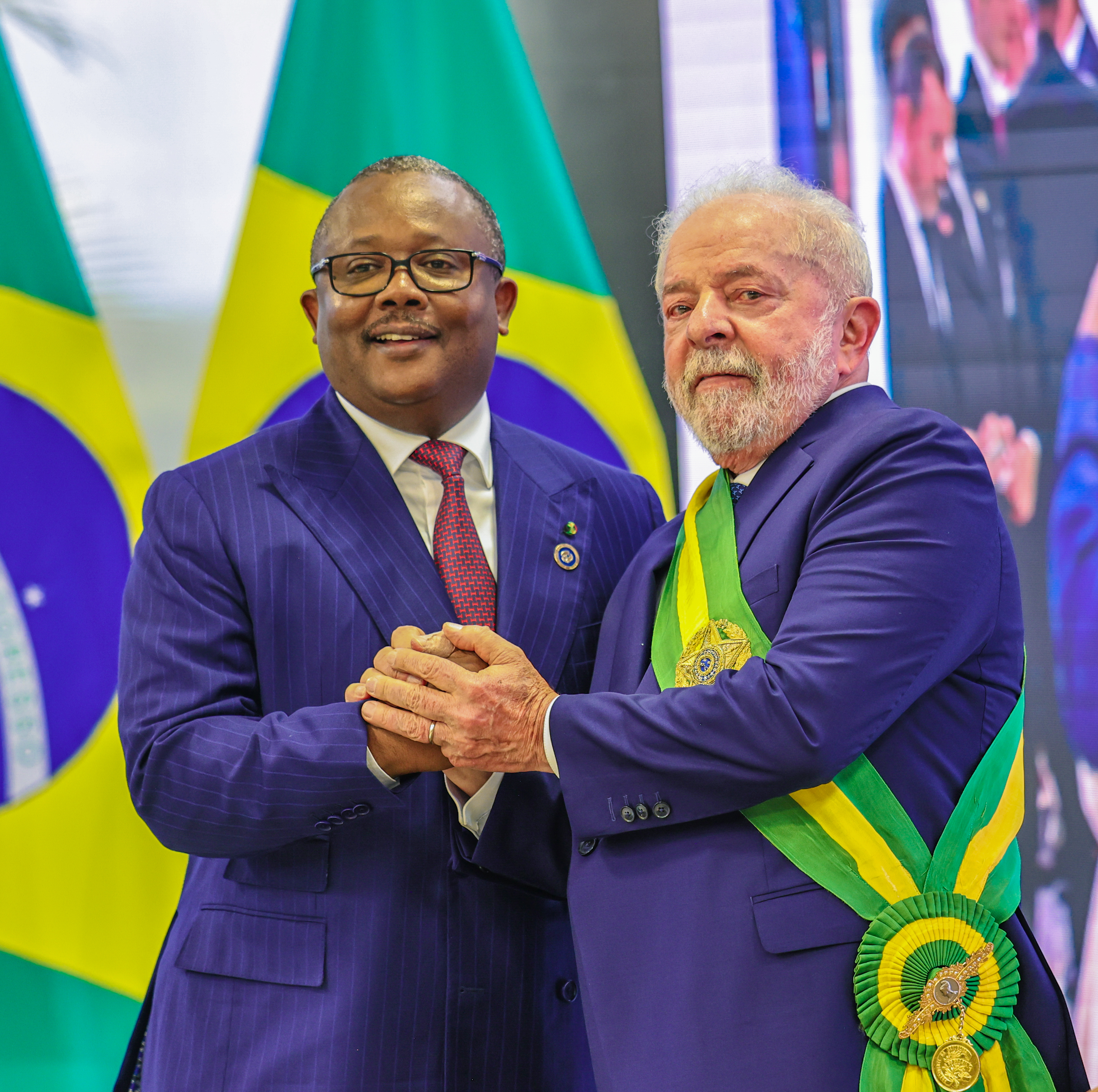
Embaló with Brazilian President Luiz Inácio Lula da Silva, 1 January 2023

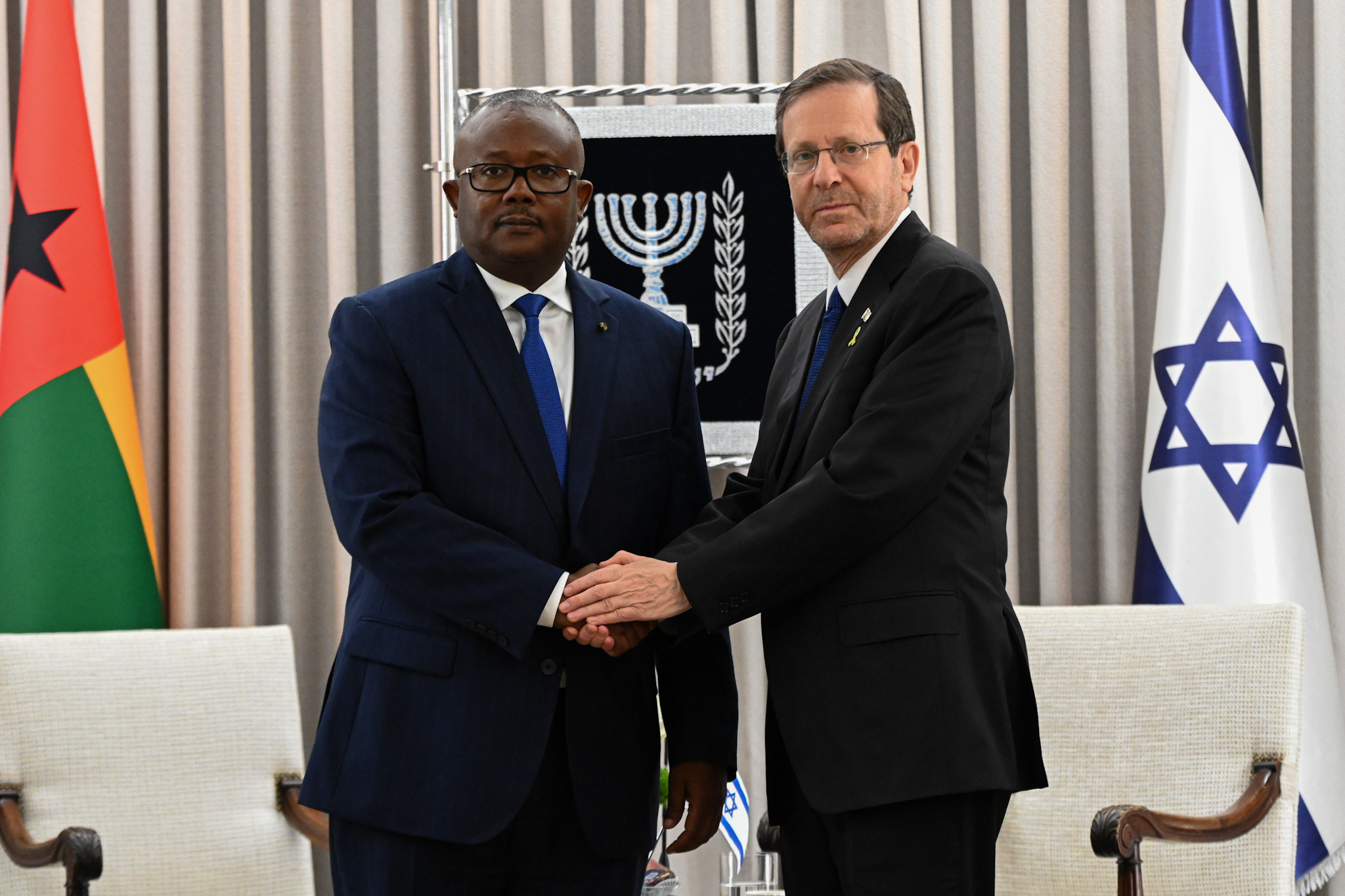
Embaló with Israeli President Isaac Herzog in Jerusalem, Israel, 3 March 2024

Sissoco Embaló has stated that his governing style is that of "Embaloism", which he defines as "order, discipline, and development", asserting that "there is neither small state nor small president" and comparing himself to Lee Kuan Yew and Rodrigo Duterte. As part of an anti-corruption drive, he ordered the installation of CCTV surveillance cameras across the country and the arrest of Minister of Public Health Antonio Deuna on embezzlement charges in 2021.

In 2020, his presidency saw the retreat of Economic Community of West African States troops stationed in the country after the 2012 coup and attempts to arrange official visits from foreign heads of government, including the first visit from the Portuguese government in three decades, and international organisations such as the International Monetary Fund. His first official visit as head of state was a multi-country tour of Senegal, Niger, and Nigeria in March 2020.

A coup d'état to oust Embaló was attempted on 1 February 2022. He said that "many" members of the security forces had been killed in a "failed attack against democracy."

In May 2022, Embaló dissolved Guinea-Bissau's parliament, citing "persistent and unresolvable differences" with parliament.

In July 2023, he attended the 2023 Russia–Africa Summit in Saint Petersburg and met with Russian President Vladimir Putin.

On 4 December 2023, Embaló dissolved parliament, citing allegations of an attempted coup d'état. Speaker Domingos Simões Pereira accused Embaló of carrying out a constitutional coup.

On 3 March 2024, Embaló visited Jerusalem and expressed support for Israel in the Gaza war. He told Israeli President Isaac Herzog that "Guinea-Bissau and its people are at your side and ready to help you in any way possible."

On 11 September 2024, Embaló announced that he would not seek a second term in the upcoming presidential elections scheduled for November 2025. At the same time, disputes arose over when his term as president would end, as opposition groups said his term expires on 27 February 2025, while the Supreme Court ruled that it expires on 4 September 2025. On 3 March, Embaló announced that he would run again for president in the November election. He has since continued to hold the presidency following the legal expiry of his term on 4 September.

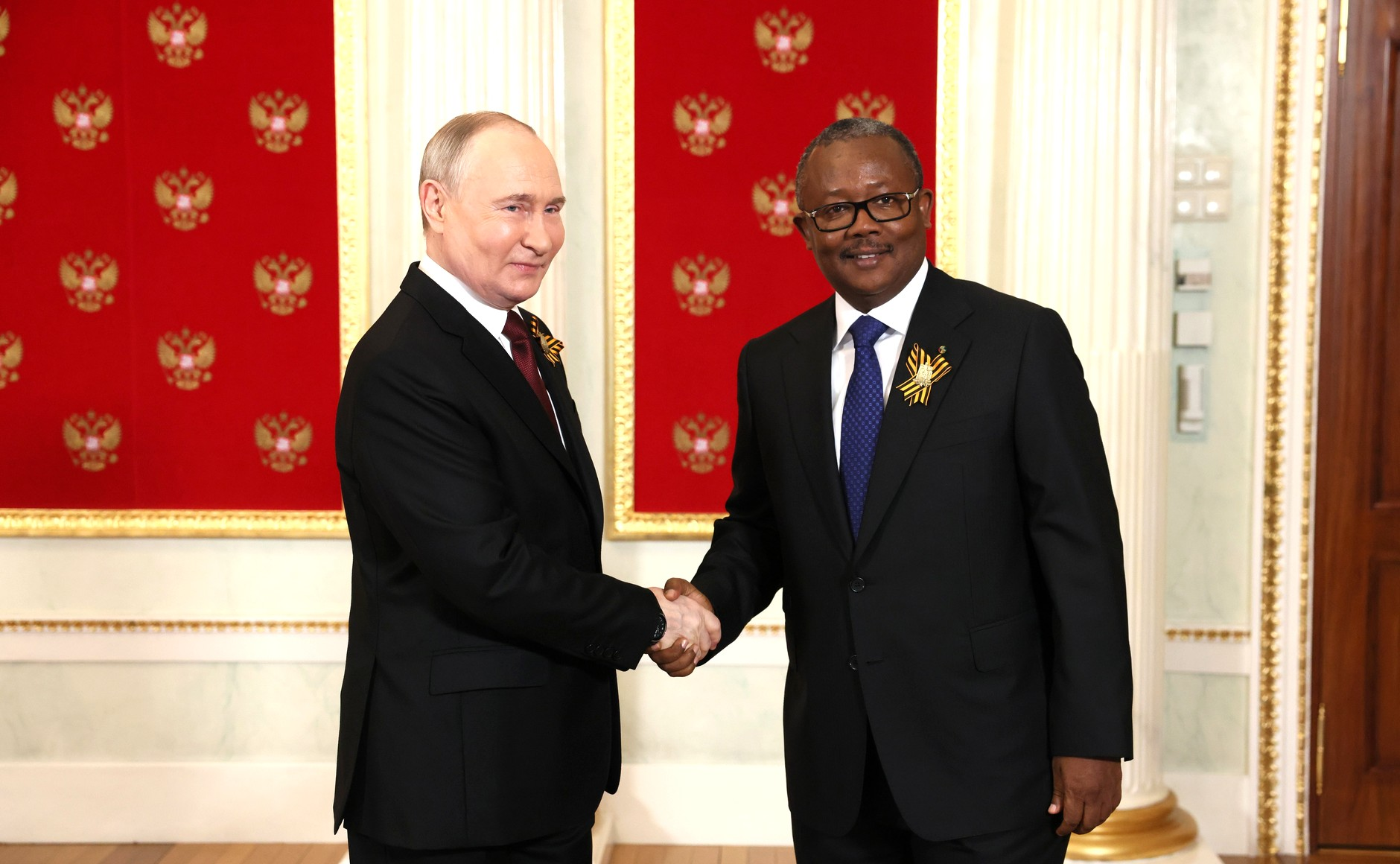
Embaló with Russian President Vladimir Putin ahead of the 2024 Moscow Victory Day Parade in Moscow, Russia, 9 May 2024

Under Embaló's presidency, Guinea-Bissau hosted and mediated negotiations between the Senegalese government and the Movement of Democratic Forces of Casamance (MFDC) that led to the announcement of a new peace agreement in Bissau on 25 February 2025 to end the Casamance conflict.

On 3 September 2025, Embaló joined the Advisory Board of the Global Center on Adaptation.

== 2025 presidential election and coup d'état ==
Embaló ran for his second presidential term in the 2025 Guinea-Bissau general election on 23 November. Both he and Fernando Dias da Costa claimed victory the next day while official results were yet to be released. On 26 November, Embaló was arrested in a coup d'état carried out by Head of the Military Office of the Presidency, Brigadier general Dinis Incanha and was detained at the headquarters of the armed forces general staff. The next day, he was released following negotiations with the Senegalese government and went into exile in Senegal, but relocated to the Republic of the Congo shortly afterwards amid reports that he had been upset by Senegalese prime minister Ousmane Sonko's description of the coup as a "sham", with Embalo being accused by opposition figures and international figures such as former Nigerian president and election monitor Goodluck Jonathan of staging the coup to avoid losing the election. On 2 October 2026, it was reported that the High Military Command for the Restoration of National Security and Public Order blocked Embaló from returning to Guinea-Bissau.

== Honours ==
=== Foreign ===
- Cape Verde:
  - 1st Class of the Amílcar Cabral Order (10 July 2021).
- Democratic Republic of Congo:
  - Grand Cordon of the Order of the National Heroes Kabila-Lumumba (30 April 2025).
- Djibouti:
  - 1st Class of the Order of Grand Star of Djibouti (15 February 2024)
- East Timor:
  - Grand Collar of the Order of Timor-Leste (28 November 2023).
- France:
  - Grand Officer of the Legion of Honour (10 December 2024)
- Jordan:
  - Grand Cordon of the Supreme Order of the Renaissance (20 February 2023).
- Palestine:
  - Grand Collar Order of the State of Palestine (6 March 2024).
- Portugal:
  - Grand Collar of the Order of Prince Henry (24 October 2023).
- Senegal:
  - Grand Cross of the National Order of the Lion (31 May 2022).
- United Arab Emirates
  - Collar of the Order of Zayed (9 February 2025).

== Gallery ==
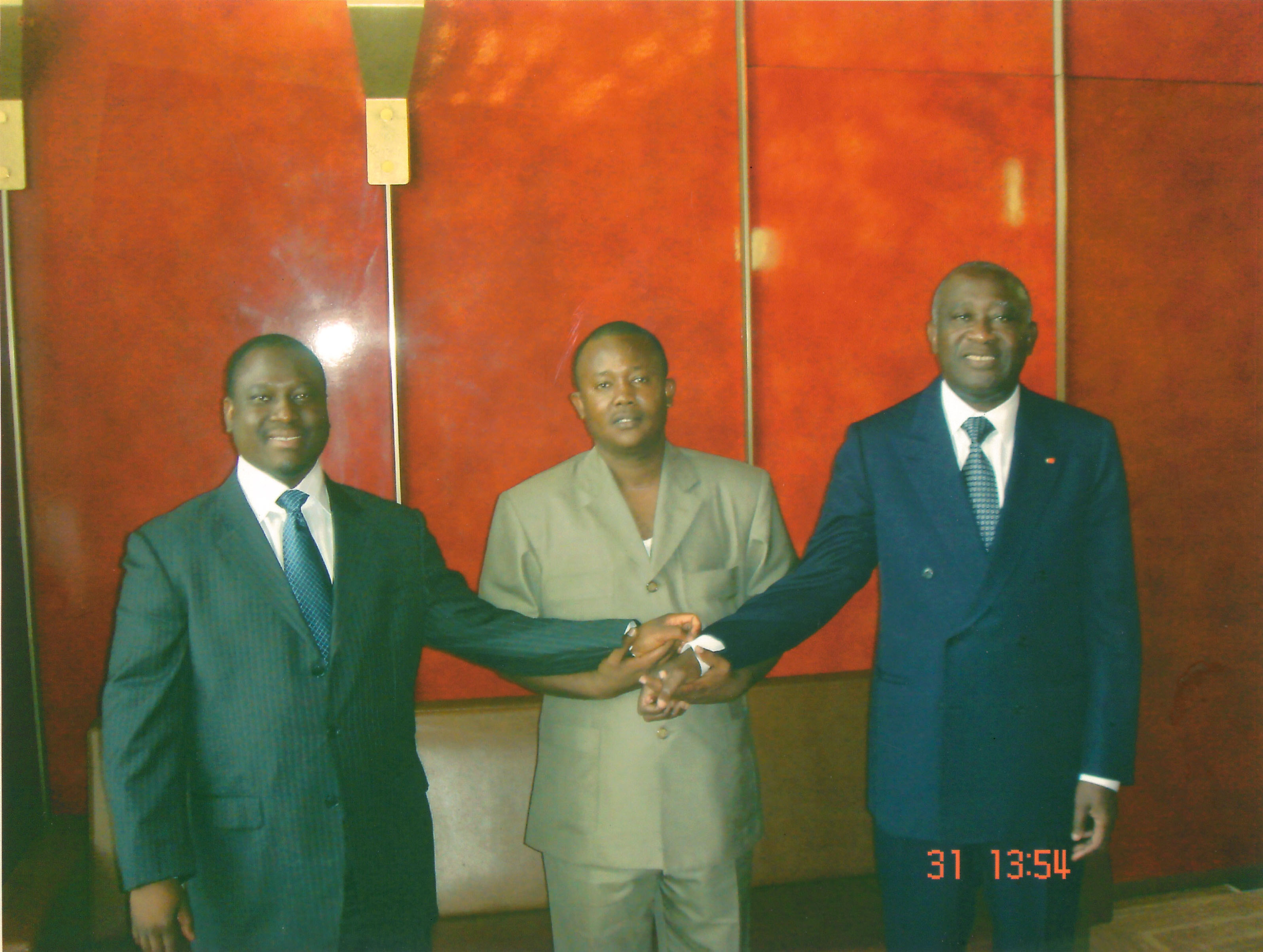

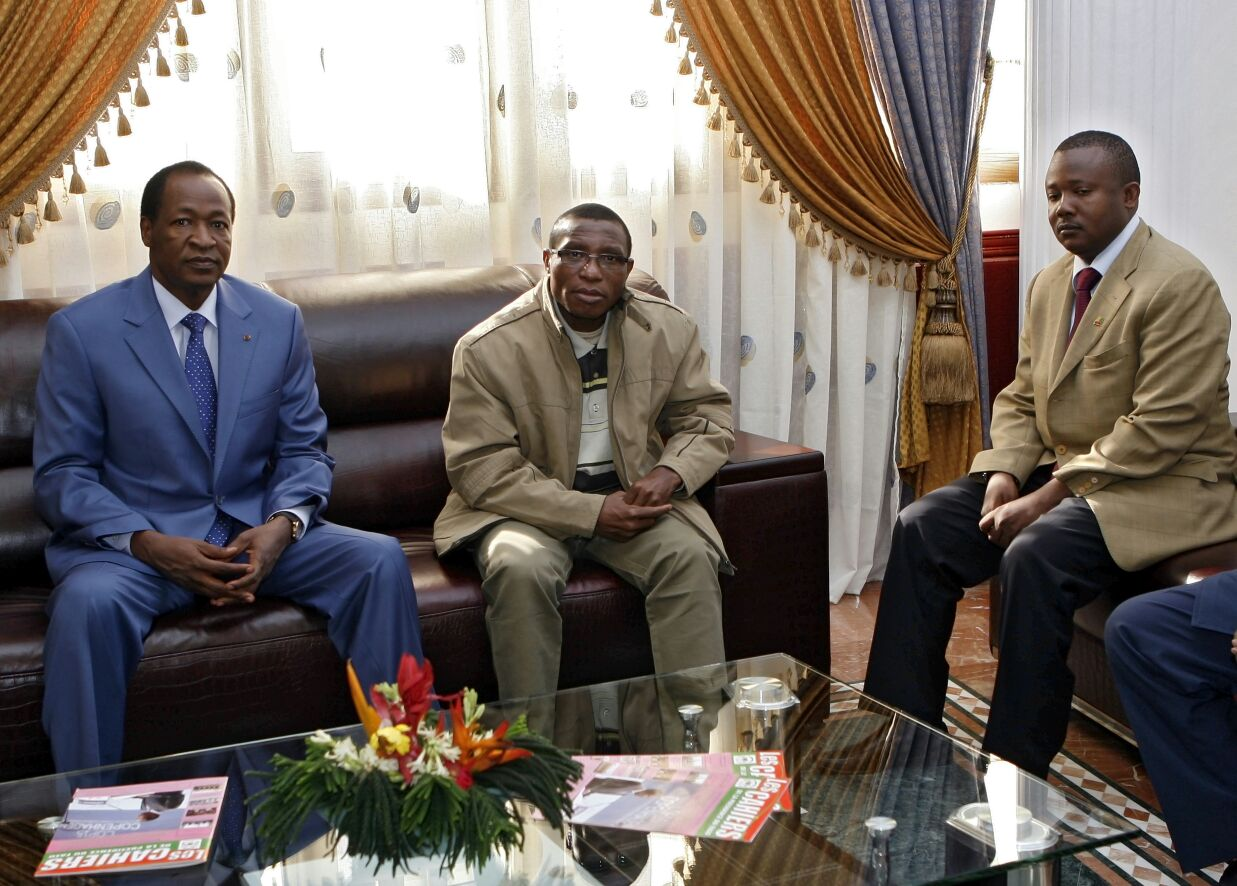

== Notes ==
Political offices
Preceded by Baciro Djá	Prime Minister of Guinea-Bissau; 2016–2018	Succeeded by Artur Silva
Preceded by José Mário Vaz	President of Guinea-Bissau; 2020–2025	Succeeded by Horta Inta-A Na Man as Transitional President
