= Presidential Palace, Bissau =

Seat of the president of Guinea-Bissau

Coordinates: 11.8639°N 15.5848°W

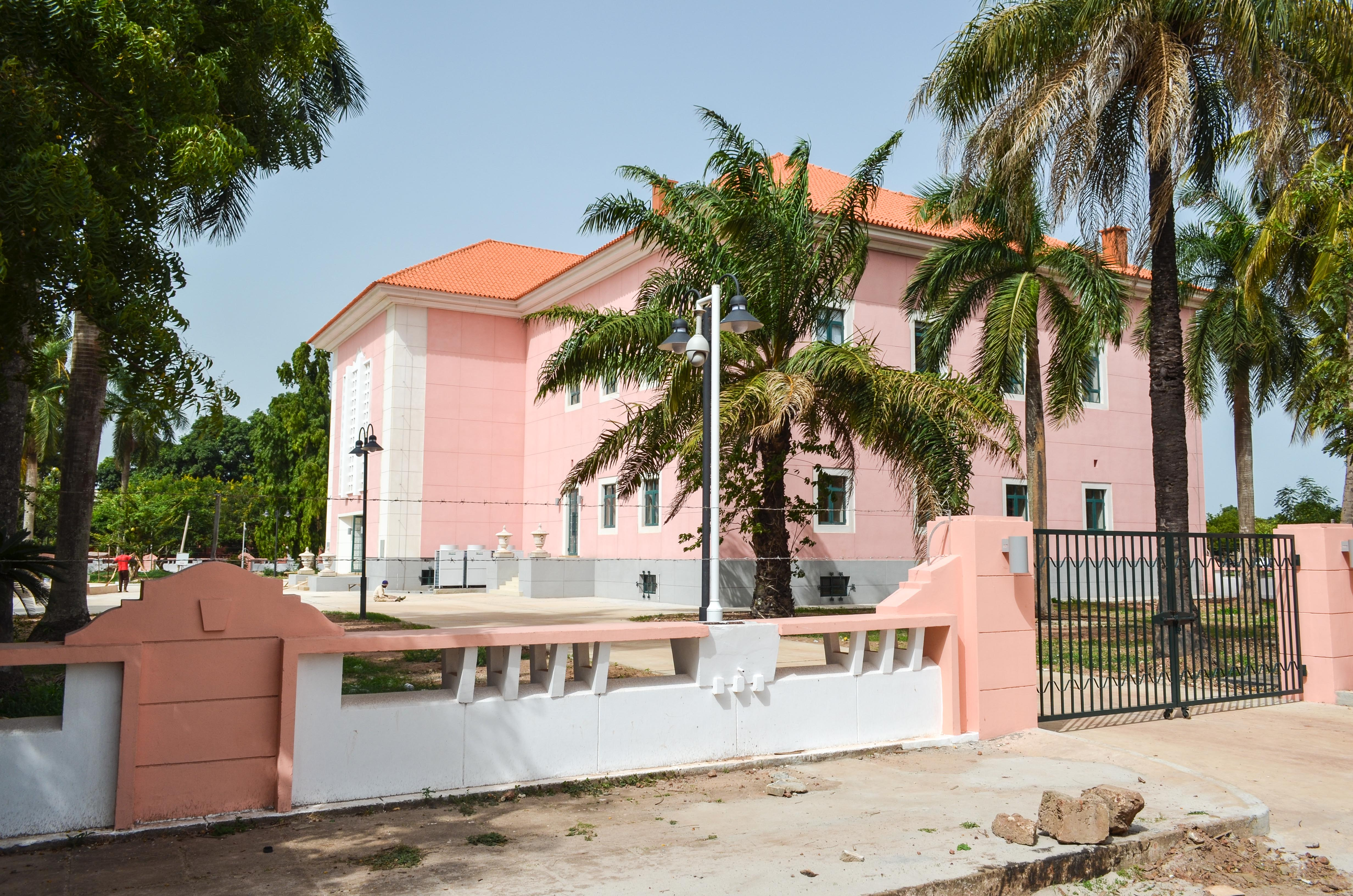
The renovated Presidential Palace in Bissau, 2013.

The Presidential Palace is the residence of the President of Guinea-Bissau, situated in the capital city of Bissau. At its height it was one of the most substantial buildings in the city, but it was ruined during the 1998–99 Guinea-Bissau Civil War and subject to bombing. By 2012, the palace had become derelict and infested with bats.

== Renovation ==
The palace was renovated and reopened in 2013, funded with Chinese investment, as part of several large-scale building projects in the city, including a 20,000 seater stadium and new parliament house.
