= High Military Command for the Restoration of National Security and Public Order =

Military junta of Guinea-Bissau since 2025

- Alto Comando Militar para a Restauração da Segurança Nacional e Ordem Pública
- Emblem of Guinea-Bissau

Overview
- Established: 26 November 2025
- Country: Guinea-Bissau
- Leader: Brigadier General Dinis Incanha (26 – 27 November 2025); General Horta Inta-A Na Man (Note: Also serving as Transitional President of Guinea-Bissau.) (27 November 2025 – present)
- Ministries: 23 ministers (at beginning) 28 ministers 27 ministers (currently)
- Headquarters: Bissau

The High Military Command for the Restoration of National Security and Public Order (Note: also called the Supreme Military Command for Restoring Order, the High Military Command for the Restoration of Order, the High Military Command for the Re-establishment of National and Public Order, Armed Forces High Command or the High Military Command) (Portuguese: Alto Comando Militar para a Restauração da Segurança Nacional e Ordem Pública) is the current military junta of Guinea-Bissau, announced on 26 November 2025 by its Spokesperson, Brigadier General Dinis Incanha, during the 2025 coup d'état. After claiming control, they ordered the closure of all borders, established an overnight curfew, and ordered the suspension of the electoral process until further notice.

On 27 November 2025, Incanha presided over the investiture ceremony of General Horta Inta-A Na Man as Transitional President of Guinea-Bissau and Head of the High Military Command for the Restoration of National Security and Public Order.

== Leaders ==
- Brigadier General Dinis Incanha (26 – 27 November 2025)
- General Horta Inta-A Na Man (27 November 2025 – present)
