= List of twin towns and sister cities in Portugal =

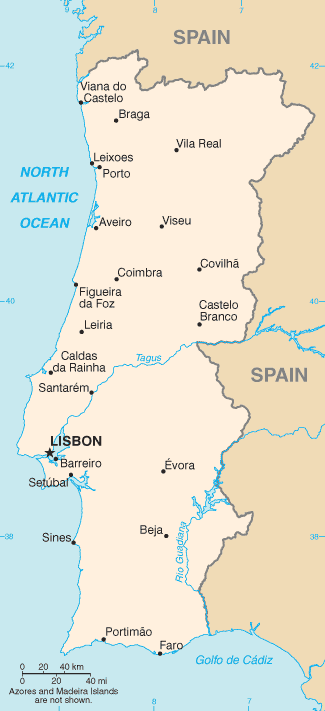
Map of Portugal

This is a list of municipalities in Portugal which have standing links to local communities in other countries known as "town twinning" (usually in Europe) or "sister cities" (usually in the rest of the world).

== A ==
Abrantes

- Hitoyoshi, Japan
- Parthenay, France
- Ribeira Brava, Cape Verde

Águeda

- Bissau, Guinea-Bissau
- Ferrol, Spain
- Madalena, Portugal
- Rio Grande, Brazil
- Sint-Gillis-Waas, Belgium

Alcobaça

- Aubergenville, France
- Bełchatów, Poland
- Cacuaco, Angola
- Chicopee, United States
- São João da Madeira, Portugal
- Tarouca, Portugal

Alcoutim

- Blain, France

Alfândega da Fé

- Medina de Rioseco, Spain
- Santa Cruz, Cape Verde

Aljezur

- Boa Vista, Cape Verde
- Kürnach, Germany

Aljustrel

- Hem, France

Almada

- Porto Amboim, Angola
- Regla (Havana), Cuba
- Sal, Cape Verde

Almeirim

- Dreux, France

Alpiarça

- Champigny-sur-Marne, France
- Wysokie Mazowieckie, Poland

Alvito

- Alvito, Italy

Amadora

- (Timor-Leste) Aileu, East Timor
- Huambo, Angola
- Mosteiros, Cape Verde
- Piracicaba, Brazil
- Príncipe, São Tomé and Príncipe
- Tarrafal, Cape Verde

Amarante

- Achères, France
- Wiesloch, Germany

Anadia

- Boa Vista, Cape Verde
- São Lourenço dos Órgãos, Cape Verde

Angra do Heroísmo

- Alenquer, Portugal
- Cartagena, Colombia
- Évora, Portugal
- Florianópolis, Brazil
- Funchal, Portugal
- Gilroy, United States
- Golegã, Portugal
- Gramado, Brazil
- Gustine, United States
- Jining, China
- Porto Novo, Cape Verde
- Ribeira Grande de Santiago, Cape Verde
- Salvador, Brazil
- São Vicente, Cape Verde
- Taunton, United States
- Tulare, United States

Ansião

- Erbach, Germany
- Mosteiros, Cape Verde
- Santos, Brazil
- São Vicente, Brazil

Arcos de Valdevez

- Dammarie-lès-Lys, France
- Décines-Charpieu, France

Arganil

- Beira, Mozambique
- Dudelange, Luxembourg
- Rio de Janeiro, Brazil
- Las Torres de Cotillas, Spain

Arouca

- Poligny, France
- Santos, Brazil

Arraiolos

- Maio, Cape Verde
- Meulan-en-Yvelines, France

Arruda dos Vinhos

- Mogente/Moixent, Spain

Aveiro

- Arcachon, France
- Belém, Brazil
- Bourges, France
- Cholargos, Greece
- Ciudad Rodrigo, Spain
- Cubatão, Brazil
- Farim, Guinea-Bissau
- Forlì, Italy
- Inhambane, Mozambique
- Mahdia, Tunisia
- Ōita, Japan
- Panyu (Guangzhou), China
- Pelotas, Brazil
- Pemba, Mozambique
- Santa Cruz, Cape Verde
- Santo António, São Tomé and Príncipe
- Viana do Castelo, Portugal

== B ==
Barcelos

- El Jadida, Morocco
- Pontevedra, Spain
- São Domingos, Cape Verde
- Svishtov, Bulgaria
- Vierzon, France

Barreiro

- Łódź, Poland
- Stara Zagora, Bulgaria

Batalha

- Joinville-le-Pont, France
- Trujillo, Spain

Belmonte

- Belmonte, Brazil
- La Mézière, France
- Olímpia, Brazil
- Olivenza, Spain
- Ouro Preto, Brazil
- Ponta Delgada, Portugal
- Porto Seguro, Brazil
- Rosh Pinna, Israel
- Sal, Cape Verde
- Santa Cruz Cabrália, Brazil
- São José do Belmonte, Brazil
- São Paulo, Brazil
- São Vicente, Brazil

Braga

- Bissorã, Guinea-Bissau
- Clermont-Ferrand, France
- Cluj-Napoca, Romania
- Cuenca, Ecuador
- Ivano-Frankivsk, Ukraine
- Manaus, Brazil
- Puteaux, France
- Ribeira Brava, Cape Verde
- Rio de Janeiro, Brazil
- Santa Fe, Argentina
- Tarrafal de São Nicolau, Cape Verde

Bragança

- Água Grande, São Tomé and Príncipe
- La Bañeza, Spain
- Bragança Paulista, Brazil
- Gallicano, Italy
- Léon, Spain
- Les Pavillons-sous-Bois, France
- Zamora, Spain

== C ==
Cabeceiras de Basto

- Boa Vista, Cape Verde
- Lalín, Spain
- Neuville-sur-Saône, France
- Quincieux, France
- Rives, France
- Sury-le-Comtal, France

Caldas da Rainha

- Deruta, Italy
- Figueiró dos Vinhos, Portugal
- Huambo, Angola
- Poços de Caldas, Brazil
- Le Raincy, France
- Santo Amaro da Imperatriz, Brazil

Câmara de Lobos

- Forio, Italy

Caminha

- Pontault-Combault, France

Cantanhede

- Alfortville, France
- Cantanhede, Brazil
- Rio Maior, Portugal

Cartaxo

- Bento Gonçalves, Brazil
- Brava, Cape Verde
- Penglai (Yantai), China
- Pucioasa, Romania
- Słupsk, Poland

Cascais

- Atami, Japan
- Biarritz, France
- Bucha, Ukraine
- Campinas, Brazil
- Essaouira, Morocco
- Gaza City, Palestine
- Guarujá, Brazil
- Irpin, Ukraine
- Karşıyaka, Turkey
- Lavreotiki, Greece
- Miami Beach, United States
- Pampilhosa da Serra, Portugal
- Sal, Cape Verde
- Santana, São Tomé and Príncipe
- Sausalito, United States
- Sinaia, Romania
- Ungheni, Moldova
- Vitória, Brazil
- Wuxi, China
- Xai-Xai, Mozambique

Castanheira de Pera

- Leimen, Germany

Castelo Branco

- Huambo, Angola
- Petrolina, Brazil
- Puławy, Poland
- Umuarama, Brazil
- Zhuhai, China

Castro Daire

- Zermatt, Switzerland

Castro Marim

- Guérande, France

Celorico de Basto

- Cambados, Spain
- Houilles, France
- Wiltz, Luxembourg

Chaves

- Angoulême, France
- Bafatá, Guinea-Bissau
- Differdange, Luxembourg
- Nampula, Mozambique
- Talence, France

Coimbra

- Aix-en-Provence, France
- Beira, Mozambique
- Cambridge, United States
- Curitiba, Brazil
- Daman, India
- Dili, Timor-Leste
- Esch-sur-Alzette, Luxembourg
- Fez, Morocco
- Macau, China
- Narni, Italy
- Padua, Italy
- Poitiers, France
- Salamanca, Spain
- Santa Clara, United States
- Santiago de Compostela, Spain
- Santos, Brazil
- São Vicente, Cape Verde
- Zaragoza, Spain

Condeixa-a-Nova

- Bretten, Germany
- Idanha-a-Nova, Portugal
- Longjumeau, France
- Pontypool, Wales, United Kingdom

Constância

- Fondettes, France

== E ==
Entroncamento

- Mosteiros, Cape Verde
- Friedberg, Germany
- Penafiel, Portugal
- Villiers-sur-Marne, France

Évora

- Angra do Heroísmo, Portugal
- Chartres, France
- Island of Mozambique, Mozambique
- Suzdal, Russia

== F ==
Fafe

- Porto Seguro, Brazil
- Sens, France

Faro

- Bolama, Guinea-Bissau
- Haikou, China
- Hayward, United States
- Huelva, Spain
- Maxixe, Mozambique
- Praia, Cape Verde
- Príncipe, São Tomé and Príncipe
- Tangier, Morocco

Felgueiras

- Boa Vista, Cape Verde
- Mocímboa da Praia, Mozambique
- Pont-Sainte-Maxence, France
- Santa Cruz Cabrália, Brazil
- São Vicente, Cape Verde

Figueira da Foz

- Angoche, Mozambique
- L'Aquila, Italy
- Ciudad Rodrigo, Spain
- Gradignan, France
- Mortágua, Portugal
- New Bedford, United States
- Praia, Cape Verde
- Yevpatoria, Ukraine

Figueira de Castelo Rodrigo

- Wissous, France

Funchal

- Angra do Heroísmo, Portugal
- Cape Town, South Africa
- Fremantle, Australia
- Gibraltar, Gibraltar
- Herzliya, Israel
- Honolulu, United States
- Ílhavo, Portugal
- Leichlingen, Germany
- Livingstone, Zambia
- Marrickville (Inner West), Australia
- Maui County, United States
- New Bedford, United States
- Oakland, United States
- Praia, Cape Verde
- Saint Helier, Jersey
- Santos, Brazil

== G ==
Góis

- Oroso, Spain

Golegã

- Angra do Heroísmo, Portugal
- Villeneuve-d'Olmes, France

Gondomar

- Barton-upon-Humber, England, United Kingdom
- Feyzin, France
- Gondomar, Spain
- Praia, Cape Verde

Gouveia

- Danbury, United States
- Labouheyre, France
- Zofingen, Switzerland

Guarda

- Béjar, Spain
- Safed, Israel
- Siegburg, Germany
- Waterbury, United States
- Wattrelos, France

Guimarães

- Brive-la-Gaillarde, France
- Colonia del Sacramento, Uruguay
- Compiègne, France
- Dijon, France
- Igualada, Spain
- Kaiserslautern, Germany
- Lisbon, Portugal
- Londrina, Brazil
- Mé-Zóchi, São Tomé and Príncipe
- Montluçon, France
- Ribeira Grande de Santiago, Cape Verde
- Rio de Janeiro, Brazil
- Tacoronte, Spain
- Tourcoing, France

== I ==
Idanha-a-Nova

- Condeixa-a-Nova, Portugal
- Hotton, Belgium
- Petrés, Spain
- Vert-le-Grand, France

Ílhavo

- Cabo Frio, Brazil
- Funchal, Portugal
- Grindavík, Iceland
- Ihtiman, Bulgaria
- New Bedford, United States
- Paraty, Brazil

== L ==
Lagoa, Algarve

- Lagoa, Azores, Portugal
- Lepe, Spain
- São Domingos, Cape Verde

Lagoa, Azores

- Bristol, United States
- Dartmouth, United States
- Fairhaven, United States
- Fall River, United States
- Lagoa, Algarve, Portugal
- Rehoboth, United States
- Sainte-Thérèse, Canada
- Santa Cruz, Cape Verde
- Taunton, United States

Lagos

- Ksar el-Kebir, Morocco
- Palos de la Frontera, Spain
- Ribeira Grande, Portugal
- Ribeira Grande de Santiago, Cape Verde
- Torres Vedras, Portugal

Lamego

- Bouchemaine, France

Leiria

- Halton, England, United Kingdom
- Maringá, Brazil
- Olavarría, Argentina
- Olivenza, Spain
- Penglai (Yantai), China
- Quint-Fonsegrives, France
- Rheine, Germany
- Saint-Maur-des-Fossés, France
- Setúbal, Portugal
- Tokushima, Japan

Lisbon

- Bissau, Guinea-Bissau
- Budapest, Hungary
- Cacheu, Guinea-Bissau
- Fortaleza, Brazil
- Guimarães, Portugal
- Luanda, Angola
- Macau, China
- Madrid, Spain
- Malacca City, Malaysia
- Maputo, Mozambique
- Praia, Cape Verde
- Rabat, Morocco
- Rio de Janeiro, Brazil
- Salvador, Brazil
- São Tomé, São Tomé and Príncipe

Loulé

- Bissorã, Guinea-Bissau
- Boa Vista, Cape Verde
- Cartaya, Spain
- Créteil, France
- Le Puy-Notre-Dame, France

Loures

- Armamar, Portugal
- Diu, India
- Maio, Cape Verde
- Matola, Mozambique

Lourinhã

- Deuil-la-Barre, France
- Écully, France
- Sal, Cape Verde

Lousada

- Errenteria, Spain
- Tulle, France

== M ==
Macedo de Cavaleiros

- Sal, Cape Verde

Madalena

- Águeda, Portugal
- Covilhã, Portugal
- Porto Novo, Cape Verde
- São Domingos, Cape Verde
- Vidigueira, Portugal

Maia

- Água Grande, São Tomé and Príncipe
- Andrézieux-Bouthéon, France
- Jiangmen, China
- Mantes-la-Jolie, France
- Mbombela, South Africa
- Nampula, Mozambique
- Ribeira Brava, Cape Verde
- Sal, Cape Verde
- Sault Ste. Marie, Canada
- Tarrafal de São Nicolau, Cape Verde

Manteigas

- Morlaàs, France
- Santa Cruz Cabrália, Brazil

Marco de Canaveses

- Príncipe, São Tomé and Príncipe
- Saint-Georges-lès-Baillargeaux, France

Marinha Grande

- Fontenay-sous-Bois, France
- Real Sitio de San Ildefonso, Spain
- Tarrafal, Cape Verde

Matosinhos

- Congonhas, Brazil
- Mansôa, Guinea-Bissau
- Nacala, Mozambique
- São Filipe, Cape Verde
- Vilagarcía de Arousa, Spain

Mealhada

- Contrexéville, France
- Courcoury, France
- Millau, France

Mêda

- Saint-Aubin, Switzerland

Mira

- Lagny-sur-Marne, France

Miranda do Corvo

- Neufchâteau, France
- Santa Catarina do Fogo, Cape Verde

Miranda do Douro

- Aranda de Duero, Spain
- Bimenes, Spain

Mirandela

- Bafatá, Guinea-Bissau
- Orthez, France

Mogadouro

- Ploumagoar, France

Moita

- Pinhel, Portugal
- Plaisir, France
- Tarrafal, Cape Verde

Monção

- Redondela, Spain
- Salvaterra de Miño, Spain
- Tarascon-sur-Ariège, France
- Vigneux-sur-Seine, France

Montemor-o-Velho

- Cerizay, France
- São José dos Pinhais, Brazil
- Xai-Xai, Mozambique

Mortágua

- Figueira da Foz, Portugal
- Wormeldange, Luxembourg

== N ==
Nazaré

- Badajoz, Spain
- Capbreton, France
- Consdorf, Luxembourg
- Nogent-sur-Marne, France

== O ==
Óbidos

- Gramado, Brazil

Oeiras

- Benguela, Angola
- Gebze, Turkey
- Inhambane, Mozambique
- Mohammedia, Morocco
- Oeiras, Brazil
- Príncipe, São Tomé and Príncipe
- Quinhámel, Guinea-Bissau
- Saint-Étienne, France
- São Vicente, Cape Verde

Oleiros

- Saint-Doulchard, France

Oliveira do Bairro

- Benguela, Angola
- Lamballe, France

Ourém

- Altötting, Germany
- Barueri, Brazil
- Buga, Colombia
- Częstochowa, Poland
- Esztergom, Hungary
- Larantuka, Indonesia
- Lourdes, France
- Monapo, Mozambique
- Ouro Preto, Brazil
- Pitești, Romania
- Le Plessis-Trévise, France
- Raseiniai, Lithuania
- Russells Point, United States
- San Giovanni Rotondo, Italy
- São Filipe, Cape Verde
- Selçuk, Turkey
- Wadowice, Poland

== P ==
Paços de Ferreira

- Sartrouville, France

Paredes de Coura

- Cenon, France

Penamacor

- Clamart, France

Pinhel

- Guijuelo, Spain
- Moita, Portugal

Ponta Delgada

- Alenquer, Portugal
- Belmonte, Portugal
- Caué, São Tomé and Príncipe
- Fall River, United States
- Florianópolis, Brazil
- Kauai County, United States
- Newport, United States
- Pleven, Bulgaria
- Praia, Cape Verde
- San Leandro, United States

Ponte da Barca

- Les Clayes-sous-Bois, France

Ponte de Lima

- Châlette-sur-Loing, France
- Vandœuvre-lès-Nancy, France
- Xinzo de Limia, Spain

Ponte de Sor

- Aiud, Romania
- Tarrafal, Cape Verde

Porto

- Beira, Mozambique
- Bordeaux, France
- Bristol, England, United Kingdom
- Duruelo de la Sierra, Spain
- Isfahan, Iran
- Jena, Germany
- Lembá, São Tomé and Príncipe
- León, Spain
- Liège, Belgium
- Luanda, Angola
- Macau, China
- Marsala, Italy
- Nagasaki, Japan
- Ndola, Zambia
- Recife, Brazil
- Santos, Brazil
- São Vicente, Cape Verde
- Shanghai, China
- Shenzhen, China
- Timișoara, Romania
- Vigo, Spain

Póvoa de Varzim

- Eschborn, Germany
- Montgeron, France

Povoação

- Dartmouth, United States
- Tarrafal, Cape Verde

== R ==
Ribeira Grande

- East Providence, United States
- Fall River, United States
- Laval, Canada
- Paul, Cape Verde
- Porto Alegre, Brazil
- Porto Novo, Cape Verde
- Ribeira Grande, Cape Verde
- Ribeira Grande de Santiago, Cape Verde

== S ==
Santa Maria da Feira

- Catió, Guinea-Bissau
- Joué-lès-Tours, France
- Kenitra, Morocco
- Targovishte, Bulgaria

Santarém

- Badajoz, Spain
- Brava, Cape Verde
- Covilhã, Portugal
- Fulacunda, Guinea-Bissau
- Grândola, Portugal
- Lubango, Angola
- Meknes, Morocco
- Santarém, Brazil
- São Vicente, Brazil
- Târgoviște, Romania
- Tiraspol, Moldova

Santiago do Cacém

- Santiago de Compostela, Spain
- Szombathely, Hungary

Santo Tirso

- Alcázar de San Juan, Spain
- Cantagalo, São Tomé and Príncipe
- Celanova, Spain
- Clichy, France
- Groß-Umstadt, Germany
- Mâcon, France
- Nova Friburgo, Brazil
- Saint-Péray, France

São João da Madeira

- Alcobaça, Portugal
- Maio, Cape Verde
- Nampula, Mozambique
- Novo Hamburgo, Brazil
- Viana, Angola

São Pedro do Sul

- Villeneuve-le-Roi, France

Seia

- Domfront-en-Poiraie, France

Seixal

- Assis Chateaubriand, Brazil
- Beira, Mozambique
- Boa Vista, Cape Verde
- Lobata, São Tomé and Príncipe
- Lobito, Angola

Sernancelhe

- Jacou, France

Sesimbra is a member of the Douzelage, a town twinning association of towns across the European Union. Sesimbra also has one other twin town.

Douzelage

- Agros, Cyprus
- Altea, Spain
- Asikkala, Finland
- Bad Kötzting, Germany
- Bellagio, Italy
- (Republic of Ireland) Bundoran, Ireland
- Chojna, Poland
- Granville, France
- Holstebro, Denmark
- Houffalize, Belgium
- Judenburg, Austria
- Kőszeg, Hungary
- Marsaskala, Malta
- Meerssen, Netherlands
- Niederanven, Luxembourg
- Oxelösund, Sweden
- Preveza, Greece
- Rokiškis, Lithuania
- Rovinj, Croatia
- Sherborne, England, United Kingdom
- Sigulda, Latvia
- Siret, Romania
- Škofja Loka, Slovenia
- Sušice, Czech Republic
- Tryavna, Bulgaria
- Türi, Estonia
- Zvolen, Slovakia

Other

- São Filipe, Cape Verde

Setúbal

- Beauvais, France
- Debrecen, Hungary
- Leiria, Portugal
- Quelimane, Mozambique
- Pau, France
- Porto Seguro, Brazil
- Safi, Morocco
- Tordesillas, Spain

Sines

- Fortaleza, Brazil
- Pemba, Mozambique
- Płock, Poland
- Santa Cruz, Cape Verde

Sintra

- Asilah, Morocco
- Beira, Mozambique
- Bissau, Guinea-Bissau
- Fontainebleau, France
- Goussainville, France
- Honolulu, United States
- El Jadida, Morocco
- Lobito, Angola
- Namaacha, Mozambique
- Nova Sintra, Cape Verde
- Old Havana (Havana), Cuba
- Ōmura, Japan
- Oviedo, Spain
- Petrópolis, Brazil
- Trindade (Mé-Zóchi), São Tomé and Príncipe

Soure

- Neuville-de-Poitou, France

Soure – Samuel is a member of the Charter of European Rural Communities, a town twinning association across the European Union, alongside with:

- Bienvenida, Spain
- Bièvre, Belgium
- Bucine, Italy
- (Republic of Ireland) Cashel, Ireland
- Cissé, France
- Desborough, England, United Kingdom
- Esch (Haaren), Netherlands
- Hepstedt, Germany
- Ibănești, Romania
- Kandava (Tukums), Latvia
- Kannus, Finland
- Kolindros, Greece
- Lassee, Austria
- Medzev, Slovakia
- Næstved, Denmark
- Nagycenk, Hungary
- Nadur, Malta
- Ockelbo, Sweden
- Pano Lefkara, Cyprus
- Põlva, Estonia
- Starý Poddvorov, Czech Republic
- Strzyżów, Poland
- Svoge, Bulgaria
- Tisno, Croatia
- Troisvierges, Luxembourg
- Žagarė (Joniškis), Lithuania

== T ==
Tarouca

- Alcobaça, Portugal
- Paraíso do Tocantins, Brazil

Tavira

- Kenitra, Morocco
- Łańcut, Poland
- Perpignan, France
- Porto Novo, Cape Verde
- Punta Umbría, Spain
- San Bartolomé de la Torre, Spain
- Taverny, France

Tomar

- Hadera, Israel
- Ribeira Grande de Santiago, Cape Verde
- Vincennes, France

Tondela

- Lannemezan, France

Torres Novas

- Moreni, Romania
- Rambouillet, France
- Ribeira Grande, Cape Verde

Torres Vedras

- Lagos, Portugal
- Villenave-d'Ornon, France
- Wellington, England, United Kingdom

== V ==
Vale de Cambra

- Mondorf-les-Bains, Luxembourg

Valpaços

- Bettembourg, Luxembourg
- La Garenne-Colombes, France

Viana do Alentejo

- Igarassu, Brazil
- Porto Seguro, Brazil
- Viana, Brazil

Viana do Castelo

- Alagoas, Brazil
- Aveiro, Portugal
- Cabedelo, Brazil
- Cacheu, Guinea-Bissau
- Hendaye, France
- Igarassu, Brazil
- Itajaí, Brazil
- Lugo, Spain
- Matola, Mozambique
- Pessac, France
- Porto Seguro, Brazil
- Ribeira Grande, Cape Verde
- Rio de Janeiro, Brazil
- Riom, France
- Viana, Brazil
- Ziguinchor, Senegal

Vila do Bispo

- Baiona, Spain
- Cape Canaveral, United States
- Nishinoomote, Japan
- Santa Fe, Spain

Vila do Conde

- Le Cannet, France
- Ferrol, Spain
- Olinda, Brazil
- Portalegre, Portugal

Vila Franca de Xira

- Santa Catarina, Cape Verde
- Tarrafal, Cape Verde
- Villejuif, France

Vila Nova da Barquinha

- Dissay, France
- Madone, Italy
- Rio Maior, Portugal
- Santa Catarina do Fogo, Cape Verde

Vila Nova de Famalicão

- Arteixo, Spain
- Caruaru, Brazil
- Givors, France
- Lobata, São Tomé and Príncipe
- Mocuba, Mozambique
- Saint-Fargeau-Ponthierry, France
- São Vicente, Cape Verde

Vila Nova de Poiares

- Caué, São Tomé and Príncipe
- Douchy-les-Mines, France
- Lichinga, Mozambique
- (Timor-Leste) Liquiçá, East Timor
- Maio, Cape Verde
- Mielec, Poland

Vila Pouca de Aguiar

- Bettendorf, Luxembourg

Vila Real

- Espinho, Portugal
- Grasse, France
- Mende, France
- Osnabrück, Germany
- Ourense, Spain

Vila Verde

- Lohmar, Germany
- Petit-Couronne, France
- Saint-Mandé, France

Viseu

- Abidjan, Ivory Coast
- Arezzo, Italy
- Campinas, Brazil
- Cantagalo, São Tomé and Príncipe
- Haskovo, Bulgaria
- León, Spain
- Lublin, Poland
- Marly-le-Roi, France
- Matola, Mozambique
- Rio de Janeiro, Brazil
- São Filipe, Cape Verde

Vizela

- Caldas de Reis, Spain
- Frontignan, France
