= Cacheu Fort =

Fort of Cacheu
- Guinea-Bissau
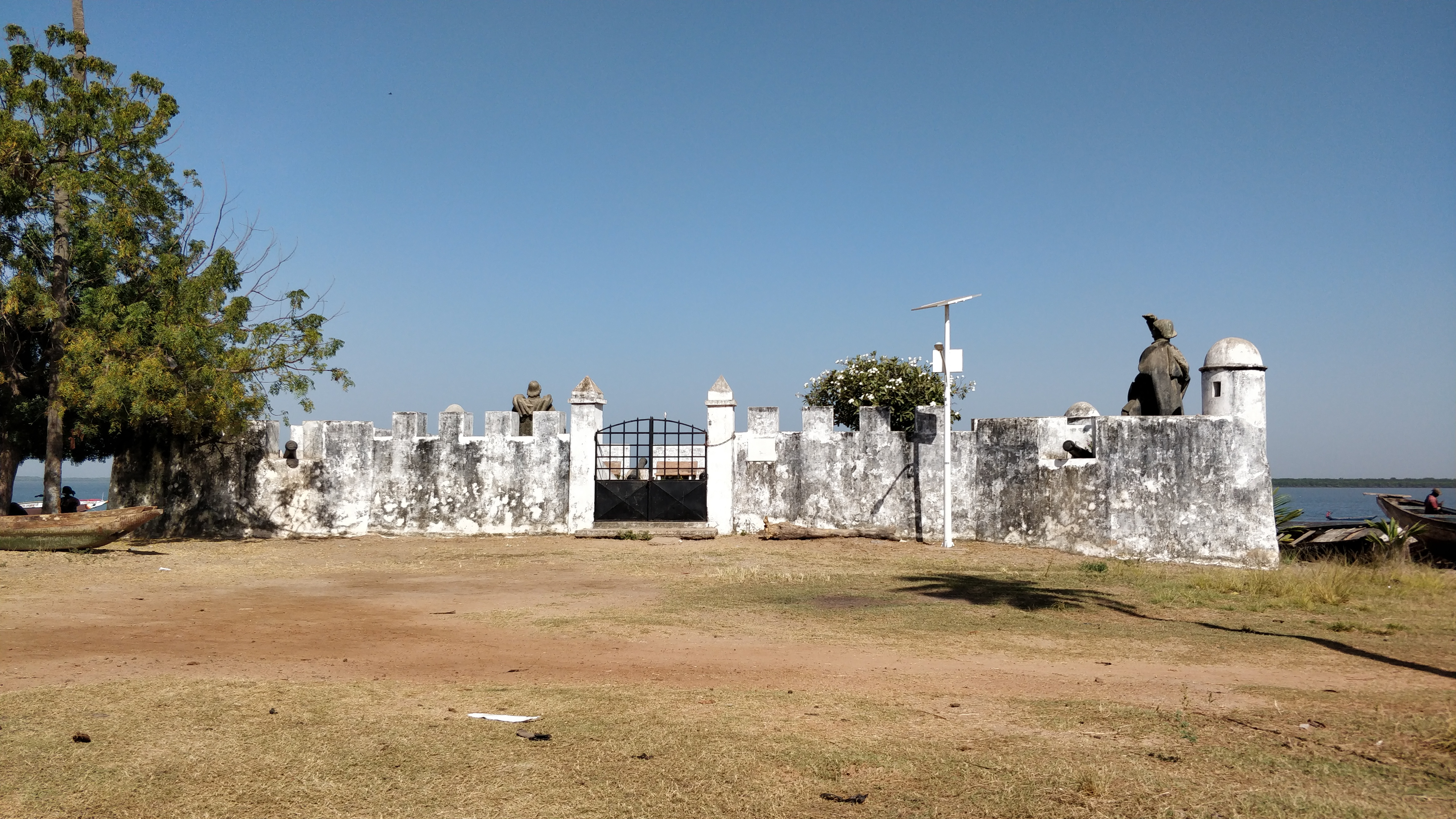

Site information
- Controlled by: Portuguese Empire
- Condition: Good

Location
- Coordinates: 12°16′37″N 16°10′02″W

Site history
- Built: 1641-1647

The Fort of Cacheu is located near the mouth of the Cacheu River, in the city of Cacheu, Cacheu region, in the northwest of Guinea-Bissau.

== History ==
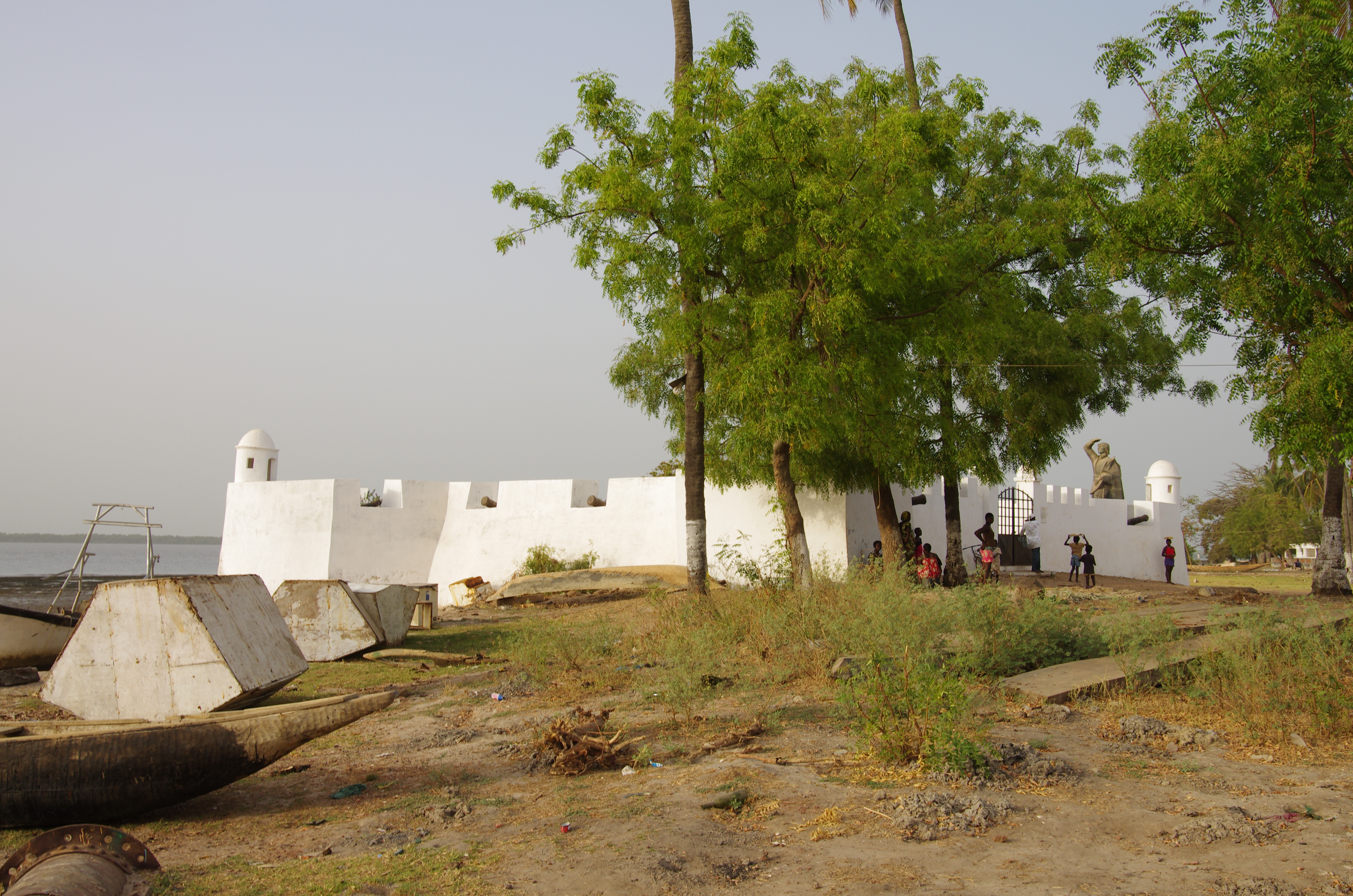
Side view

The establishment of Cacheu dates back to a first fort built in 1588 by Manuel Lopes Cardoso, with the function of defending the feitoria founded in the region, erected with the permission of the local king, and which had been attacked by the English in 1567. In addition to ensuring the Portuguese military presence, it provided important support for the trade in manufactured fabrics, ivory and slaves.

The current fort was started in 1641 by the captain-major Gonçalo Gambôa de Ayalla do defend the place from Spanish ships.

To encourage trade, the Company of Cacheu and Rivers and Commerce of Guinea was founded on 1675. On May 19, 1676, had its privileges confirmed by the Crown, namely: the right to trade on the coast of Guinea and in the archipelago of Cape Verde, as well as slaves for the Metropolis, the overseas domains and Spanish America. It ceased its activities in 1682. It was replaced by the Cacheu and Cape Verde Company in 1690, which relocated its activities to Bissau.

The town of Cacheu developed next to the fort, composed of two neighborhoods: Vila Fria closer to the river where the Portuguese resided, composed of two streets Rua Direita and Rua de Santo António, and the Vila Quente, where the native Guineans lived, further from the river and composed of thatched adobe houses.

Administratively, the region was dependent on Cape Verde until the creation of the province of Portuguese Guinea, in 1879.

The fort is illustrated on a Portuguese postage stamp from 1946, from the series commemorating the "5th Centenary of the Discovery of Guinea", with a face value of 30 escudos.

The restoration work of the former Portuguese fort was carried out from January to March 2004, with resources of around one hundred thousand Euros, made available by the Union of Capital Cities of Portuguese Official Language (UCCLA). In order to ensure its use as a leisure and cultural area, in addition to promoting tourism, the redevelopment of its interior was promoted, where various leisure facilities were installed and the statues of Portuguese navigators Gonçalves Zarco and Nuno Tristão, the first Europeans to reach the coasts of Guinea in the 15th century. In the old service buildings, a library and social rooms were installed.

== Features ==
The fort, of small dimensions, has a plan in the shape of a rectangle, 26 meters long by 24 meters wide, with small bulwarks at the edges. The walls, in mortared stone, are about four meters high and one meter thick. It was equipped with sixteen pieces. The gate-of-arms, over five feet wide, is its only access.

== See also ==
- Portuguese Guinea
