= Farim (disambiguation) =

Farim is a town in northern Guinea-Bissau.

Farim may also refer to:

- Farim, name for the upper course of the Cacheu River, in Guinea-Bissau
- Farim, Iran, a city in northern Iran
  - Farim Rural District, Iran
- Farim (crater), a crater on Mars
- SC Farim - a football club based in the town of Farim, Guinea-Bissau
