= Antotinha =

- Village
- Location in Guinea-Bissau
- Coordinates: 12°17′46″N 15°48′30″W
- Country: Guinea-Bissau
- Region: Cacheu
- Sector: Bula
- Time zone: UTC+0 (GMT)

Antotinha is a village in the Cacheu Region of northwestern Guinea-Bissau. It lies to the north of the Cacheu River, north and across the river from São Vicente.
