= List of rivers of Guinea-Bissau =

This is a list of rivers in Guinea-Bissau. This list is arranged by drainage basin, with respective tributaries indented under each larger stream's name.

== Atlantic Ocean ==
- Cacheu River
  - Farim River
  - Canjambari River
  - Ongueringão
  - Elia River (Rio Elia)
- Mansoa River
  - Rio Cana
    - Bijemita
    - Safim
- Rio Petu
- Rio Pefiné (Pefiné River)
- Geba River
  - Corubal River (Cocoli River) (Koliba River)
  - Colufe River
  - Mabani
  - Budace
  - Louvado
- Rio Grande de Buba (Bolola River)
  - Quinora
  - Buduco
  - Gam Tomé
- Tombali River
- Como River
- Cumbijã River
  - Balana River
  - Sanjota
- Cacine River
