= Alabato =

- Village
- Location in Guinea-Bissau
- Coordinates: 12°29′21″N 15°21′20″W
- Country: Guinea-Bissau
- Region: Oio Region
- Sector: Farim
- Time zone: UTC+0 (GMT)

Alabato is a village in the Oio Region of northern Guinea-Bissau. Alabato has a wet, tropical savannah climate.

== Location ==
It is located east of Cufeu.
