= Titina Silá =

Bissau-Guinean resistance fighter (1943–1973)

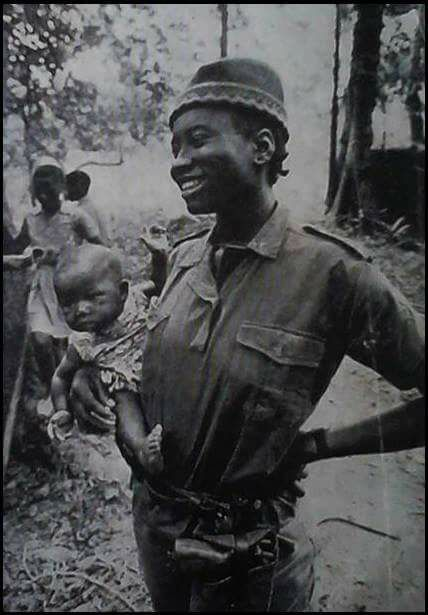
- Silá in 1968

Member of the Superior Council for the Fight
- In office 1970–1973
- President: Amílcar Cabral

Personal details
- Born: Ernestina Silá; 1 April 1943 Cadique Betna, Tombali, Portuguese Guinea
- Died: 30 January 1973 (aged 29) Farim River, Oio, Portuguese Guinea
- Resting place: Fortaleza de São José da Amura; 11°51′35.74″N 15°34′41.55″W
- Party: African Party for the Independence of Guinea and Cape Verde
- Spouse: Manuel N'Digna (m. 1970–1973)

Military service
- Allegiance: Guinea-Bissau
- Branch/service: Revolutionary Armed Forces of the People
- Years of service: 1963–1973
- Rank: Political commissar
- Unit: Northern Front
- Battles/wars: Guinea-Bissau War of Independence

Ernestina "Titina" Silá (1 April 1943 – 30 January 1973) was a Bissau-Guinean revolutionary. Recruited into the African Party for the Independence of Guinea and Cape Verde (PAIGC), while she was a young woman, she joined in the Guinea-Bissau War of Independence against the Portuguese Empire.

As one of the first women in the PAIGC, she quickly became a popular leading figure in the revolutionary movement and was often praised by its leader, Amílcar Cabral. After being trained in nursing in the Soviet Union, she took a commanding role in the Northern Front of the war, rising to the rank of political commissar and joining the Superior Council of the Revolutionary Armed Forces of the People (FARP).

While on her way to attend Cabral's funeral, in January 1973, she was ambushed and killed by the Portuguese. As a revolutionary martyr, her memory has been commemorated by memorial dedications and her example used to educate young men and women on gender equality. The day of her death, 30 January, is celebrated as National Women's Day in Guinea-Bissau.

== Biography ==
On 1 April 1943, Ernestina Silá was born in the village of Cadique Betna, in the Tombali Region of Portuguese Guinea. In the late 1950s, while the anti-colonial movement was first beginning to mobilise, Silá and her mother moved to Cacine. There, Silá was recruited into the movement by João Bernardo Vieira, who tasked her with distributing illegal literature and liaising between the mobilisers and the local peasantry. In 1962, she joined the African Party for the Independence of Guinea and Cape Verde (PAIGC) – becoming one of its first woman members – shortly before the outbreak of the Guinea-Bissau War of Independence.

Although her mother tried to dissuade her from her activism, before long, Silá had convinced almost everyone she knew to either support the PAIGC or even to join it themselves. Despite her mother's pleas, she ran away from home and joined the guerrillas in Cubucaré, where she was trained as a fighter and began her first combat missions. Known for her "joyful" disposition, Silá quickly became "one of the most loved leaders of the revolution", and developed into an "iconic female soldier". At the request of Luís Cabral, in 1964, Silá designed "elegant look[ing]" uniforms for the newly-recruited PAIGC militiawomen. That same year, Silá attended the first party congress of the PAIGC in Cassacá, where she was praised for her activities in the south and taken under the paternal wing of the party's leader Amílcar Cabral.

As part of a program to mobilise young women into the movement, Silá was sent abroad to the Soviet Union, in order to be trained in nursing. In 1965, Silá travelled alongside Carmen Pereira to Kyiv, the capital of the Ukrainian Soviet Socialist Republic. There, at the Kyiv Pedagogical Institute, healthcare lessons were transmitted to the Buissau-Guinean nursing students through several languages: first, the teacher spoke Russian; this was translated into Spanish by an interpreter; which Pereira converted into Portuguese notes before giving the lesson in Guinea-Bissau Creole; finally, Silá translated the lesson into Balanta for the nursing students. There she developed a close friendship with Francisca Pereira, with whom she shared a similar disposition, as well as an aversion to the cold Eastern European winter.

Upon their return, Pereira and Silá became leading figures in the independence movement. Silá was assigned to the northern front, the most hotly contested front of the conflict, where she took charge of the region's healthcare. She quickly rose through the ranks, becoming the assistant to the front's commander, for whom she established a militia training camp. She was later appointed as political commissar of the northern region, which put her in charge of social reconstruction and political education in the area. She rarely left the front, only doing so to attend PAIGC conferences, official visits or high council meetings. During one of these meetings, Cabral introduced her to Gérard Chaliand as: "Comrade Titina Sila, who is in overall charge of our public health program in the North. She saw combat in the South, gun in hand." In 1970, she joined the Superior Council for the Fight (Portuguese: Comité Superior de Luta; CSL), joining Carmen and Francisca Pereira as the only women on the 75-member body. She then met and married fellow Committee member Manuel N'Digna, a commander of the Revolutionary Armed Forces of the People (FARP), with whom she had two children; the eldest dying in infancy in 1972. Worried about similarly losing her young daughter Eva, Silá had her placed in the care of her grandmother, in the safe zone of Boké.

Upon receiving news of the death of the PAIGC leader Amílcar Cabral, Silá began making her way towards Guinea-Conakry, in order to attend his funeral. On 30 January 1973, while crossing over the Farim River, Silá's detachment was ambushed by a patrol of the Portuguese Navy; and Silá herself was shot. A Cuban doctor attempted to save Silá, but she fell into the river and drowned, as she was not able to swim. The rest of her detachment managed to escape, but they had lost their political commissar.

By the following year, Guinea-Bissau had declared independence, which was formally recognised in the wake of the Carnation Revolution in Portugal. Silá's remains were taken to Bissau and interred in the Fortaleza de São José da Amura, near Amílcar Cabral's mausoleum.

== Legacy ==
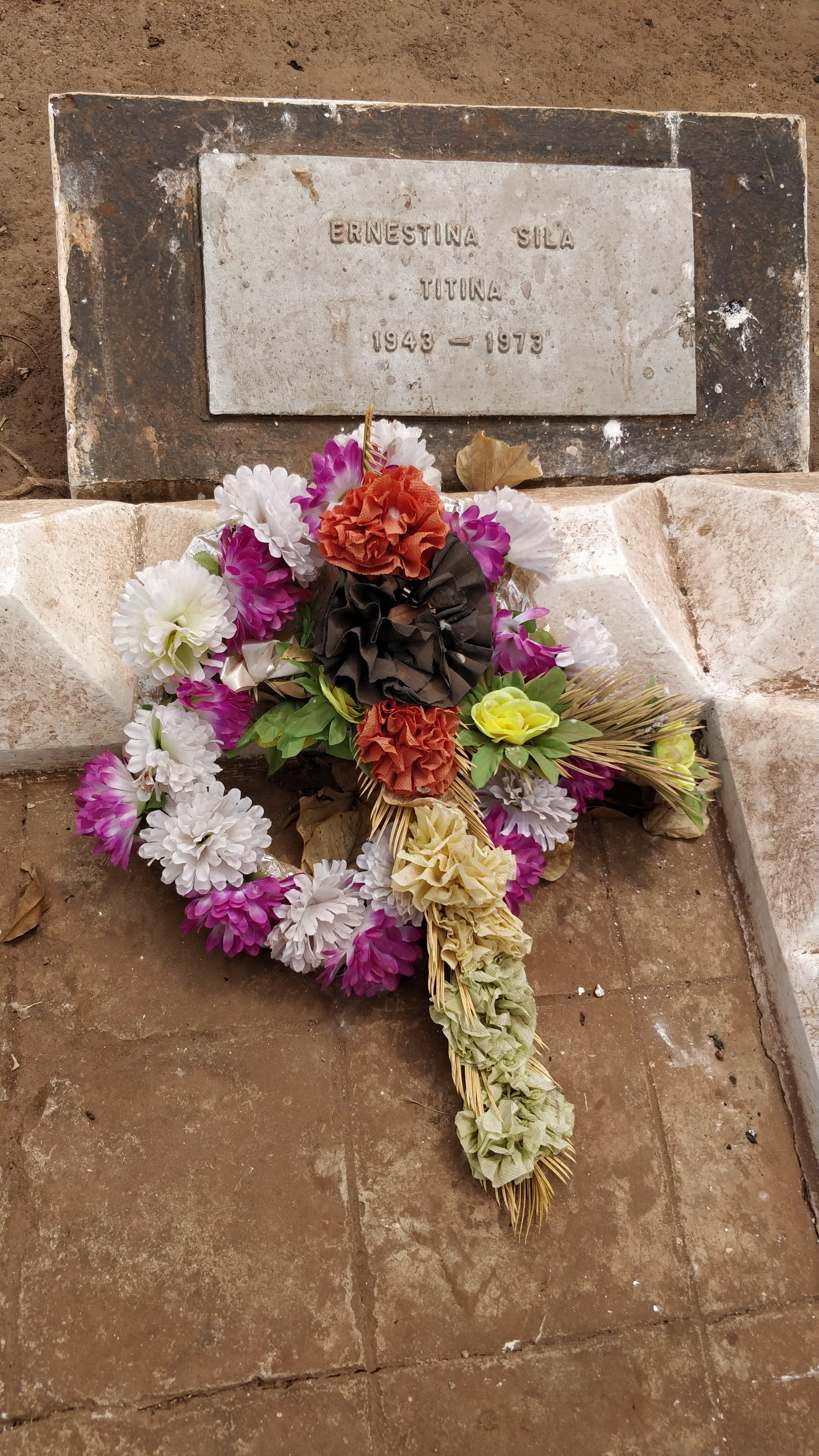
Grave of Titina Silá in the Fortaleza de São José da Amura

Along with Amílcar Cabral and Domingos Ramos, Titina Silá has been recognised by Bissau-Guinean political society as a martyr of the war of independence. To commemorate her memory, a square in the capital of Bissau was named after her. In March 1977, a state-owned fruit juice factory named after Silá was opened in the town of Bolama, but it was closed by the mid-1980s.

Silá was one of the few women to be recognised in the leadership of the anti-colonial movement. Although significantly more attention is paid to her male counterparts, in the 21st century, Silá is still celebrated in Guinea-Bissau as a war hero. Her example has also been used in political education classes, in order to educate young men on gender equality and inspire young women to take on responsibilities as leaders. In a eulogy to Silá, Francisca Pereira recalled that:

Titina symbolized the kind of woman that PAIGC is trying to produce. Strong enough to withstand even the kind of test that the north front presented, she was always able to find a solution to the most difficult problem. She had natural leadership qualities and the people responded to her because she was neither selfishly demanding nor authoritarian. Everybody loved her. Everybody. That is why we were all crying when we heard that she had been killed. She was always willing to sacrifice herself for the struggle and that is how she died. She was someone formed by the revolution and who had attained the ideal of what the Guinea-Bissau woman should be.

Each 30 January, marking the anniversary of Silá's death, Guinea-Bissau celebrates "National Day of Guinean Women" in order to commemorate the women that died for the country's independence.

== Bibliography ==
- Balona de Oliveira, Ana (2020). "Breaking Canons: Intersectional Feminism and Anti-Racism in the Work of Black Women Artists". Vista (6): 79–100. doi:10.21814/vista.3060. hdl:10362/110465. ISSN 2184-1284.
- Davidson, Basil (1989). "Launching participation". The Fortunate Isles: A Study in African Transformation. Africa World Press. pp. 143–166. ISBN 0-86543-122-1. LCCN 88-83119.
- Frascina, Francesca (2014). Gendering the nation: women, men and fiction in Guinea-Bissau (MPhil). University of Birmingham.
- Galvão, Inês; Laranjeiro, Catarina (2019). "Gender Struggle in Guinea-Bissau: Women's Participation on and off the Liberation Record". In Domingos, Nuno; Bandeira Jerónimo, Miguel; Roque, Ricardo (eds.). Resistance and Colonialism: Insurgent Peoples in World History. Cambridge Imperial and Post-Colonial Studies. Palgrave Macmillan. pp. 85–122. doi:10.1007/978-3-030-19167-2_4. ISBN 978-3-030-19167-2. S2CID 201363744.
- Katsakioris, Constantin (2021). "Students from Portuguese Africa in the Soviet Union, 1960–74: Anti-colonialism, Education, and the Socialist Alliance". Journal of Contemporary History. 56 (1): 142–165. doi:10.1177/0022009419893739. ISSN 0022-0094.
- Kimble, Judy (1981). "The Struggle within the Struggle". Feminist Review. 8 (1): 107–111. doi:10.1057/fr.1981.14. ISSN 0141-7789. S2CID 143909571.
- Karibe Mendy, Peter; Lobban Jr., Richard A., eds. (2013). "Sila, Ernestina (1943–1973)". Historical Dictionary of the Republic of Guinea-Bissau (4th ed.). Scarecrow Press. pp. 375–376. ISBN 978-0-8108-8027-6.
- Urdang, Stephanie (1975). "Fighting Two Colonialisms: The Women's Struggle in Guinea-Bissau". African Studies Review. 18 (3): 29–34. doi:10.2307/523719. ISSN 0002-0206. JSTOR 523719. S2CID 144232701.
- Urdang, Stephanie (1979). Fighting Two Colonialisms: Women in Guinea-Bissau. Monthly Review Press. ISBN 0-85345-511-2. LCCN 79-2329.
- Washington, Shirley (1979). "Liberation Economics in the Post-War Reconstruction of Guinea-Bissau". A Current Bibliography on African Affairs. 11 (3): 237–252. doi:10.1177/001132557901100303. S2CID 155525588.
