= Bibiana Vaz =

Nhara slave trader in Cacheu, Guinea-Bissau

Bibiana Vaz de França (c. 1630 – 1694+) was a prominent nhara slave-trader in Cacheu, Guinea-Bissau.

Bibiana Vaz was a Lançada, or Luso-African born to a Kriston (Christianised African) mother and Luso-African Cape Verdean father. She and her extended family built up a powerful trading empire that stretched from the Gambia River to Sierra Leone.

She married Ambrosio Gomez, a former captain-major of Cacheu, who at the time was said to be the richest man in Guinea.

In February 1684, Vaz and an alliance of trading partners, including the second in command of the fort of Cacheu, attempted to murder the commandant, Joseph Goncalves de Oliveira, who had restricted their trade. He managed to avoid the plot, but a month later was seized. He was taken to the town of Farim more than 50 miles upriver and imprisoned for over a year in Vaz's country home. At the time a new Company of Cacheu was being founded, but when representatives arrived in the town, the 'Republic of Cacheu' refused to let them land, demanding control over trade and direct communication with the king. A triumvirate, which included Bibiana's brother, ruled the town "in the name of the people", meaning the Afro-Portuguese traders, for several months before the company would regain control.

In May 1685 the new captain-major, Antonio de Barros Bezerra, appeared with two ships and over a hundred men, a reasserted Portuguese power, arresting the triumvirate. In 1687 Bibiana Vaz was arrested and taken to São Tiago (today as Santiago), where she was held as prisoner. Portuguese authorities, however, were unable to confiscate her property as that lay under the aegis of local African rulers, her allies and fellow advocates of free trade. They granted her a pardon in exchange for an indemnity and a promise that she would construct a fort in Bolor on the Cacheu River, which she never did.
