= Jabadá =

- Village
- Location in Guinea-Bissau
- Coordinates: 11°53′5″N 15°20′44″W
- Country: Guinea-Bissau
- Region: Oio Region
- Sector: Mansôa
- Time zone: UTC+0 (GMT)

Jabadá is a village in the Oio Region of western-central Guinea-Bissau. It lies on the southern bank of the Geba River.
