= Cufeu =

- Village
- Location in Guinea-Bissau
- Coordinates: 12°29′41″N 15°23′3″W
- Country: Guinea-Bissau
- Region: Oio Region
- Sector: Farim
- Time zone: UTC+0 (GMT)

Cufeu is a village in the Oio Region of northern Guinea-Bissau. It is located west of Alabato.
