= Fortaleza de São José da Amura =

Fort in Bissau, Guinea-Bissau

Fort São José of Amura
- Guinea-Bissau
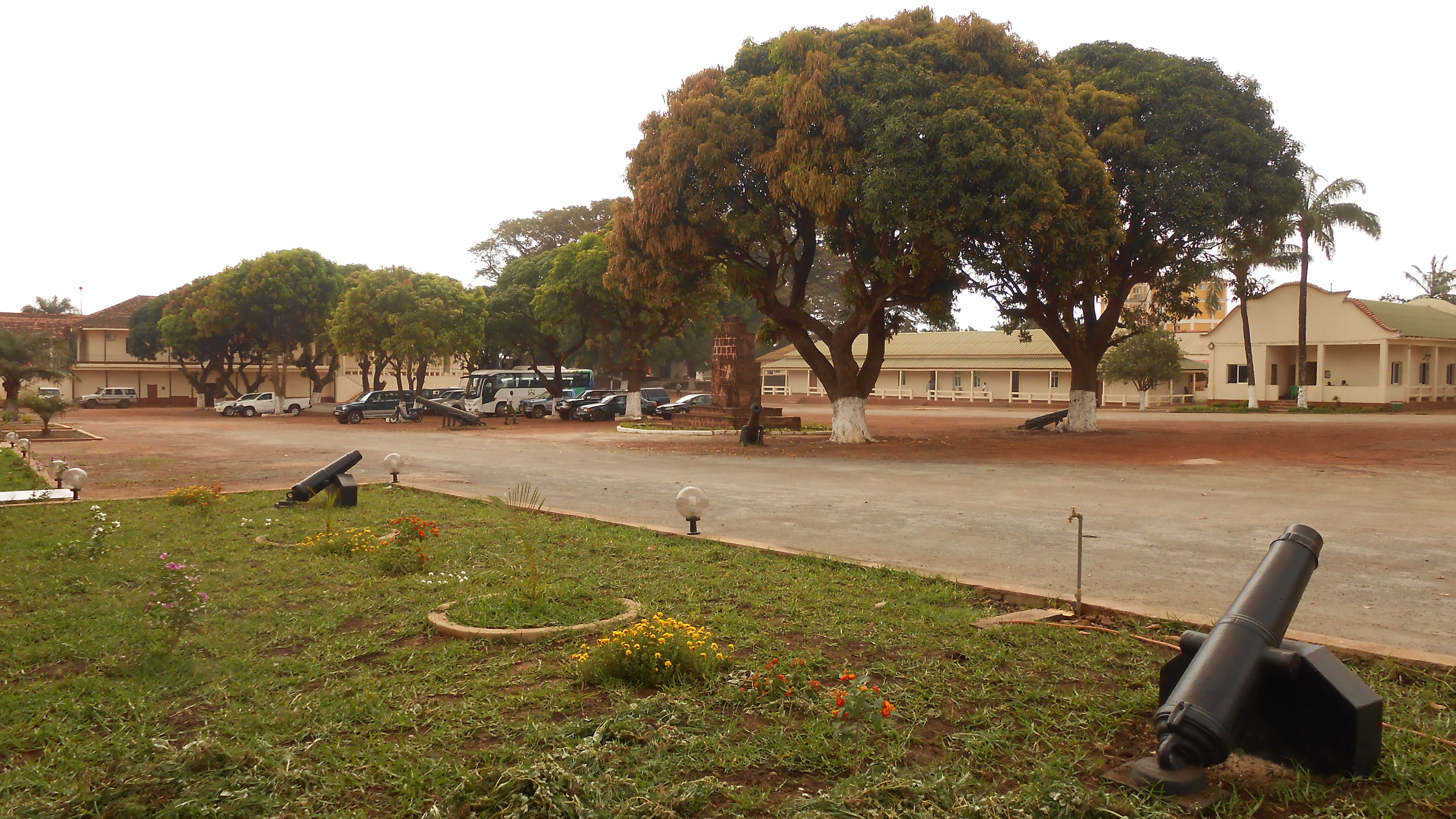

Site information
- Controlled by: Portuguese Empire
- Condition: Good

Location
- Location within Guinea-Bissau
- Coordinates: 11°51′37″N 15°34′43″W

Site history
- Built: 1753

Fort São José of Amura (Fortaleza de São José da Amura in Portuguese), also known locally as Amura Fort (Fortaleza de Amura), is a fortification located in the city of Bissau, region of Bissau, capital of Guinea-Bissau, in West Africa.

== History ==
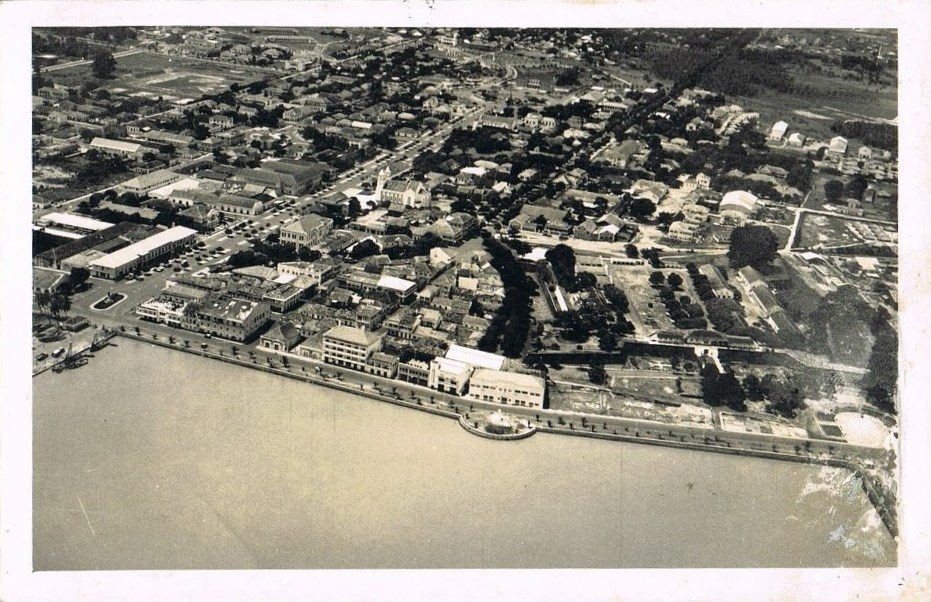
1950s aerial photo of Bissau, with Fort São José visible to the right

In the last quarter of the 17th century, French presence in Guinea intensified with the activities of the Senegal Company, a chartered company created to trade in slaves to the Antilles. It was in this context that the captain-major of Cacheu, António de Barros Bezerra, reported back to Lisbon the French pretensions to build a fortification in Bissau in a letter to the Portuguese sovereign dated March 4, 1687, saying that they had sent ships with materials for the construction of a fort, although he had managed to prevent this by working with the local king on whose lands the projected fortress was to be built. On the same date, the Portuguese factor of Cacheu also informed the king of the French desire to build a fort on the islet next to Bissau, possibly the islet of Bandim.

The new governor of Cape Verde, Veríssimo Carvalho da Costa, on a visit to Guinea, also informed the sovereign about the matter, in a letter dated from Cacheu on 2 April 1687, referring to the measures agreed together with the captain-major to avoid the French establishment:

We uniformly agree that the fortress of Bissau should be built with it, which we amused the French not to build with it, because if it were not for the king [of Bissau, Bacampolo-Có] so fond of Your Majesty they would have managed to do so, for which they asked permission., and he would not give it to him, saying that Your Majesty had in his land a church which was his fortress.

And adds:

I tell Your Majesty how I have sent to Bissau, which is 30 leagues away from this stronghold, to speak with the King, and today, on the 2nd of April, his reply arrived, which I send to Your Majesty as well as what I wrote to him, and I am told by his letter, and by the people I sent there, the uproar with which he and his nobles and people received the memory that Your Majesty has of him, and the joy with which they will also receive the priest Fr. Francisco de Pinhel, and more religious missionaries, and the dress and other things that Your Majesty was served if you sent him; he immediately gave me the best place that island has to make a fortress... sent his general, and his son and some nobles and I made him that coat that I understood was necessary to satisfy them, and now I send them that the king asks me to do, as well as the people who are going to start that work, and two pieces of artillery and six soldiers, while others are not enough to take possession of the place determined for the fortification for which we have named Manuel Teles de Avelar (...).

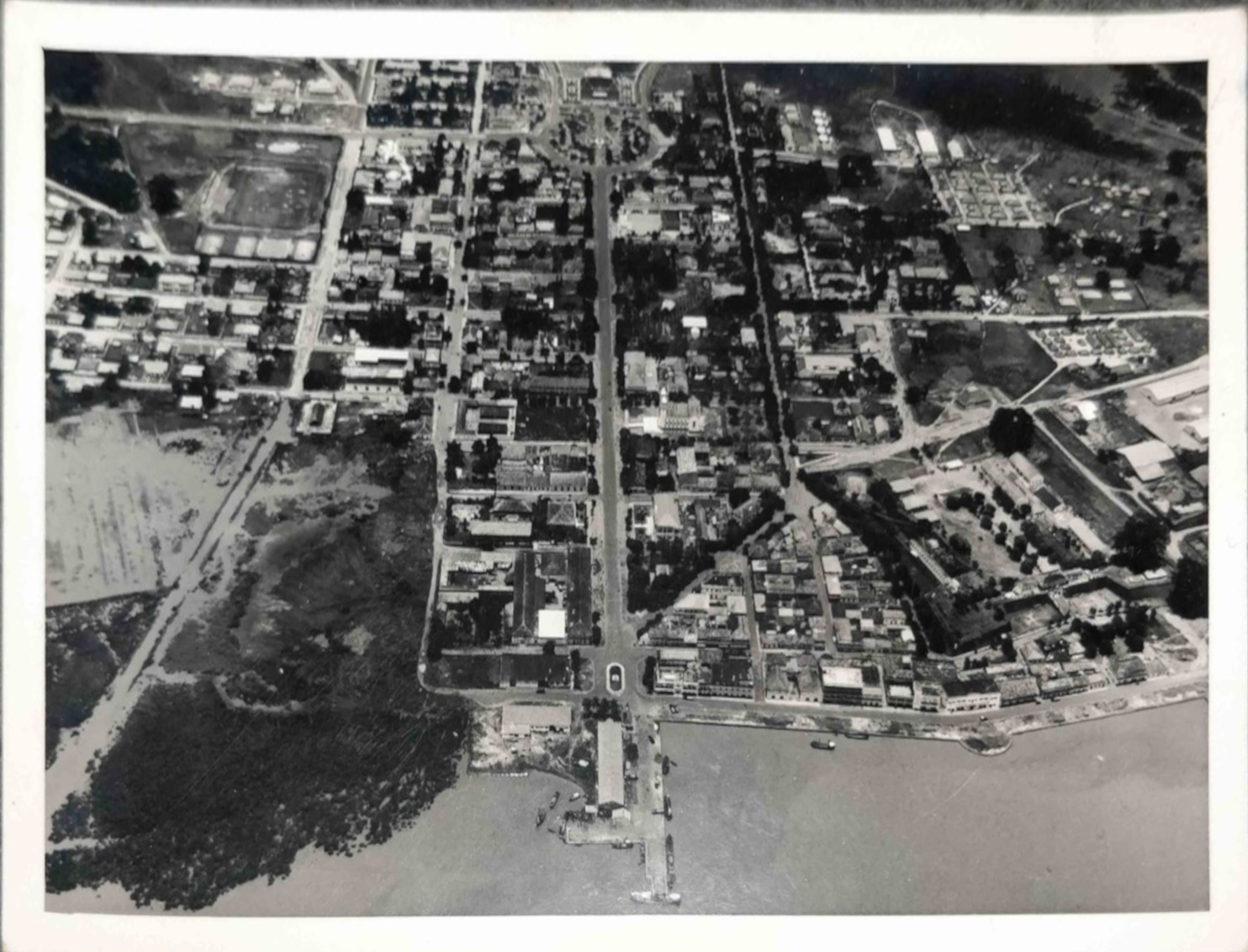
1955 aerial photo of Bissau and fort São José

The royal charter of March 15 1692 which created the Captaincy-Major of Bissau stipulated a garrison of forty men and the construction of a fortress, the cost of which should be borne by the Cacheu and Cape Verde Company, established on January 3, 1690.

The first structure was built by the Portuguese starting in 1696, under the command of Captain General José Pinheiro. It housed the trading company, Cacheu and Cape Verde Company. The crown ceased to renew the exploration contract in 1703 which led to the abandonment of the Captaincy of Bissau in December, and the fortress was later destroyed.

== Current fortress ==
The current fort was built in November 1753 under the plan made by Manuel de Vinhais Sarmento, and further changes were made in 1766 by Colonel Manuel Germano da Mota. It underwent repairs from 1858 to 1860, led by Captain Januário Correia de Almeida. In the twentieth century, it was restored from the 1970s, under the guidance of architect Luis Benavente. Open to the public, it now houses the mausoleum of Amilcar Cabral.

=== Features ===
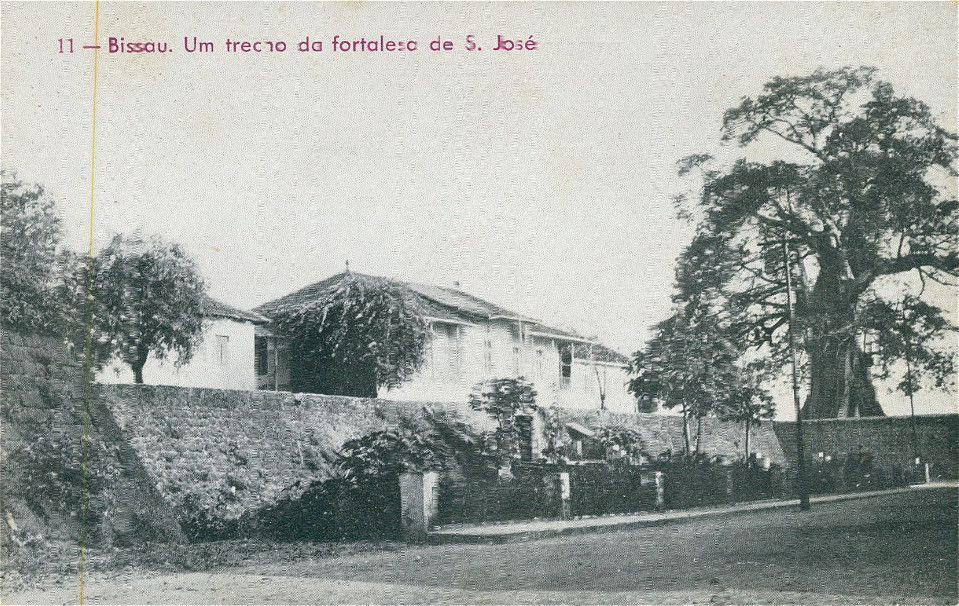
Gate of Fort São José, 1920s photo

The fortification has a quadrangular plan in the Vauban style, with pentagonal bastions at the edges. In its walls 38 gunboats were opened. On its embankment, the service buildings are erected (Command House, Troop Barracks and Warehouses). The defense of the fort was complemented by a palisade that joined it to a small fort by the sea, with a square plan, with two gun placements on the land side.

== Notable burials ==
- Titina Silá
- Malam Bacai Sanhá
- Kumba Ialá
- João Bernardo Vieira
- Osvaldo Vieira

== See also ==
- Cacheu Fort
- Portuguese Guinea
