= Bambaia =

Bambaia may refer to:

- The sculptor Agostino Busti
- Bambaia, Bafata, Guinea-Bissau
- Bambaia, Oio, Guinea-Bissau
- Bambaia, Quinara, Guinea-Bissau
