= Bambaia, Oio =

Bambaia
- Village
- Location in Guinea-Bissau
- Coordinates: 12°21′56″N 15°4′1″W
- Country: Guinea-Bissau
- Region: Oio Region
- Sector: Mansaba
- Time zone: UTC+0 (GMT)

Bambaiá is a village in the Oio Region of northern Guinea-Bissau. It is located west of Casa Nova and northeast of Mansaba.
