= Jolmete =

- Village
- Location in Guinea-Bissau
- Coordinates: 12°13′28″N 15°51′41″W
- Country: Guinea-Bissau
- Region: Cacheu
- Sector: Bula
- Time zone: UTC+0 (GMT)

Jolmete is a village in the Cacheu Region of northwestern Guinea-Bissau, to the south of the Cacheu River.
