= Beatrice of Portugal, Countess of Alburquerque =

Beatrice of Portugal
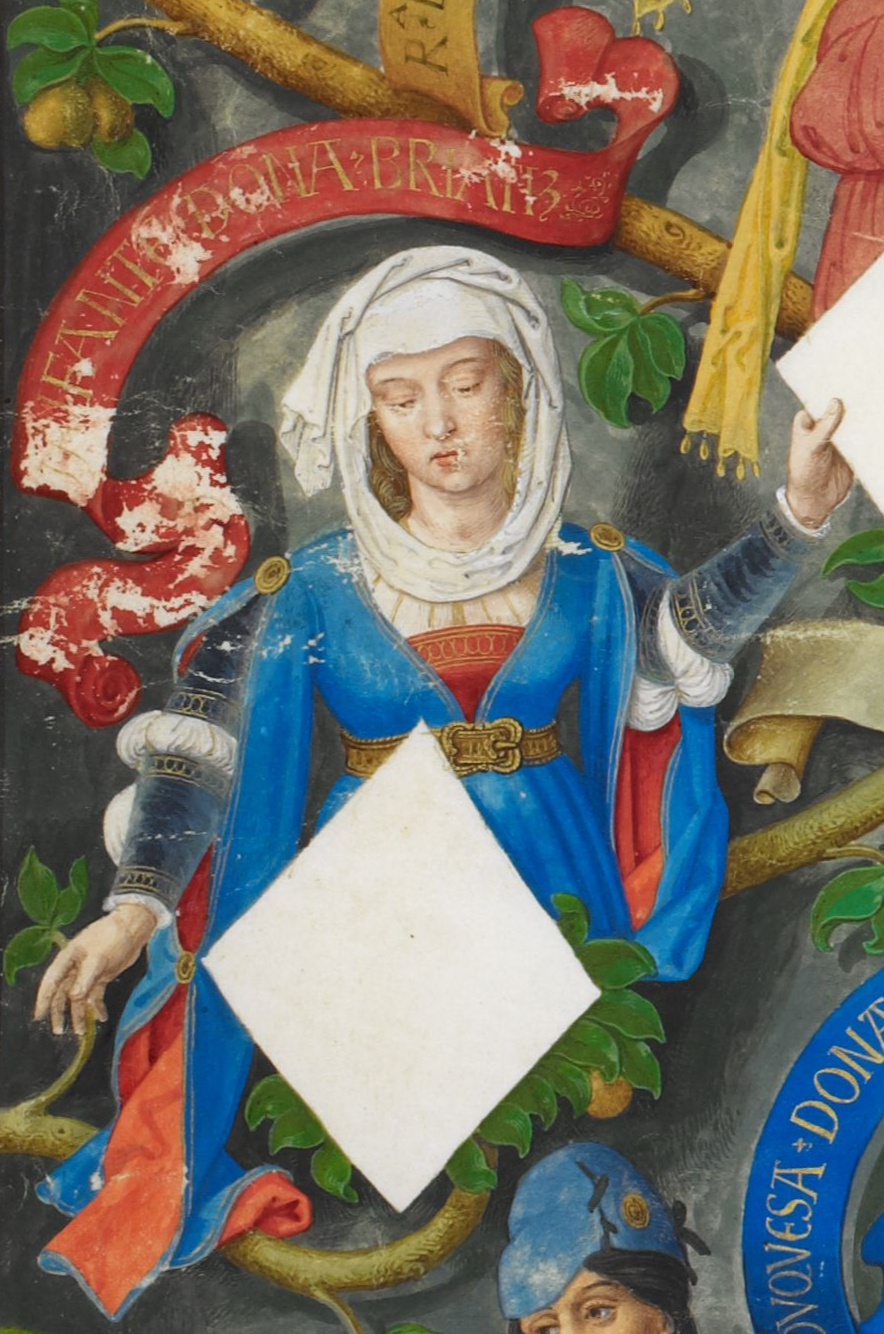

Countess of Alburquerque
- Tenure: c. 1373–19 February 1374
- Born: c. 1354 (Note: Sources disagree on Beatrice's birth year: Rodrigues Oliveira and Muxagata give c. 1354, while Olivera Serrano gives c. 1351.); Coimbra, Kingdom of Portugal
- Died: 1382; Ledesma, Crown of Castile
- Burial: Burgos Cathedral
- Spouse: Sancho Alfonso of Alburquerque
- Issue: Eleanor, Queen of Aragon
- House: Burgundy-Portugal
- Father: Peter I of Portugal
- Mother: Inês de Castro

Beatrice of Portugal (c. 1351 or c. 1354 – 1382) was Countess of Alburquerque as the wife of Sancho Alfonso of Alburquerque. She was the daughter of Peter I of Portugal and his second wife Inês de Castro, and the paternal aunt of Beatrice, Queen of Castile.

== Life ==
Sources disagree on Beatrice's birth year, giving either 1351 or 1354.

Beatrice's entitlement to be considered an Infanta of Portugal is debated, and modern scholarship is not consistent on the question. Beatrice's parentage is not disputed: she was the biological daughter of Peter I and Inês de Castro. What is debated is her legal status, since the Catholic Church never ratified her parents' claimed marriage, and consequently whether the dynastic title Infanta properly applied to her. Historian César Olivera Serrano describes her at one point as an illegitimate ("bastarda") daughter of Peter I, while elsewhere in the same work referring to her as "the Infanta Beatriz" without addressing the distinction.

On 12 June 1360, three years after becoming king, Peter I declared before a notary at Cantanhede that he had married Inês de Castro on 1 January 1353. Six days later, at Coimbra, Bishop Gil of Guarda and Estêvão Lobato gave sworn testimony of the marriage. According to the chronicler Fernão Lopes, Peter then asked Pope Innocent VI to confirm the marriage and legitimize its children, and the Pope refused. (Note: The historian António Brásio argued in 1958 that the papal bull reproduced by Lopes is a forgery made in 1385. He reported that neither he nor a colleague could find it in the papal registers, and noted that José Barbosa had already judged it false in 1727. Brásio also reported that Marcelo Caetano had accepted the bull as authentic because it is recorded in the papal chancery. Brásio regarded the speeches Lopes attributes to João das Regras as the chronicler's own composition, while accepting the outcome of the Cortes. He concluded that the surviving documents do not establish that Peter and Inês failed to contract a valid marriage.) In the papal registers for July 1361, Brásio found instead petitions in which Peter asked for privileges for himself and for his children Fernando, João, Dinis and Beatrice, including permission to marry within the fourth degree of kinship, and the Pope granted them. At the 1385 Cortes of Coimbra, João das Regras, the advocate of John of Avis, produced documents said to contain the papal refusal. Historian H. V. Livermore calls this enough to settle the case, since without a legal claim for Inês's sons João and Dinis the practical advantage lay with John.

Peter I dictated his will at the Monastery of São Francisco in Estremoz late on Sunday 17 January 1367 and died in the early hours of 18 January. Peter ordered that the Quinta de Canidelo, which had belonged to Inês de Castro, be delivered to her children (which includes Beatrice). He bequeathed Beatrice 100,000 libras (Note: In Peter I's reign the libra was a unit of account worth 20 soldos, and Fernão Lopes recorded that the silver marc was then worth 19 libras. Taking a marc of about 230 g, Sérgio Ferreira calculates that one libra corresponded to roughly 12.11 g of silver between 1357 and 1367, which he presents as an approximation. At that rate 100,000 libras equalled about 1,200 kg of silver. For comparison, at an auction at Alvorge in 1367 a horse sold with its saddle, bridle and spurs for 330 soldos (199.65 g of silver), so 100,000 libras would have bought about 6,000 such horses. In 1365 the monastery of Grijó paid a carpenter 13 libras for wages, clothing and shoes, about 21.66 soldos a month, with food provided in addition, so 100,000 libras equalled roughly 7,700 years of that payment.) "for her marriage" (Note: The same will left a smaller marriage-designated bequest, 5,000 libras, to an unnamed daughter raised at the Monastery of Santa Clara de Coimbra. Two earlier testaments from the reign of Dinis I show the same practice, but in libras that held more silver. Sérgio Ferreira puts the silver marc at 14 libras for Dinis's reign (his table begins in 1300), so one libra held about 16.4 g of silver and 100 libras about 1.6 kg. On 30 April 1291 Estêvão Pais, a canon of Braga, left his sister Alda 100 libras, a silver marc and two measures of millet for her marriage, to be paid only once she was married or betrothed. The clause is recorded as cancelled in the surviving copy. As written, it was the largest sum in libras that the will left to an individual, and other such legacies reached no more than 50 libras. On 14 November 1324 João Vicente, archdeacon of Barroso and canon of Évora, left a woman named Maria de Braga 100 libras "for marriage and for nothing else" (pera casamento e nom pera al), against 200 libras for his niece and 20 libras for a man who had served him. For comparison, in 1323 Ferreira records monthly salaries at the Estudo Geral, the Portuguese university, of 50 libras for the master of Laws and 23.26 libras on average for a professor.), more than any of his other children received individually. His daughter Maria, then in Aragon, received 20,000 libras, and Beatrice's brothers João and Dinis received 20,000 libras each. Ferdinand was named heir to the other goods of the kingdom and headed the will's eight executors.

Beatrice married Sancho de Alburquerque, a brother of Henry II of Castile, under the 1373 Treaty of Santarém between Ferdinand I of Portugal and Henry II. (Note: The chronicler Fernão Lopes states that the treaty provided for only this one marriage, and explicitly rejects a claim made by the Castilian chronicler Pero López de Ayala that two further marriages were arranged under it. Ayala had written that the treaty also arranged the marriage of Ferdinand I's daughter, also named Beatrice to Fadrique, Duke of Benavente, and that of Ferdinand's illegitimate daughter Isabel to Alfonso, Count of Noreña. However, the Fadrique match is separately documented as a proposal that was never carried out, and Olivera Serrano's own account dates Isabel's betrothal to Alfonso to 1376, three years after the treaty, with their marriage in 1377. Lopes records that Isabel, then eight years old, was betrothed to Alfonso two days after the treaty, during Beatrice's wedding, at Santarém, but describes this as a separate arrangement made under pressure from Henry II, not as a term of the treaty itself. Historian P. E. Russell, who compared Lopes's account against a contemporary copy of the treaty, found that Lopes had worked directly from the original document and was generally reliable on this episode.) The treaty styled her "Infanta of Portugal" and assigned her a dowry of 100,000 libras, the same sum Peter I had designated for her marriage in his 1367 will, payable in the currency that had circulated in Portugal during his reign, payment was due in three annual installments, with the first third owed within three months of the marriage. Ferdinand signed and swore to the treaty at Santarém on 19 March 1373, and Henry II ratified it in Lisbon on 22 March, where Beatrice's brother Dinis and Sancho himself were both named among the witnesses. The two kings met in person on the Tagus on 7 April to confirm the treaty again, and the wedding followed two days later. The couple received the lordship of Alburquerque. Sancho died the following year, in 1374, during a brawl in Burgos. The marriage produced one legitimate daughter, Eleanor of Alburquerque, later Queen of Aragon. Sancho also fathered an illegitimate daughter, who became prioress of the convent of Sancti Spiritus in Toro and remained in contact with her half-sister Eleanor. Beatrice died in 1382 and was buried in Burgos Cathedral.

== Children ==
Beatrice and Sancho Alfonso of Alburquerque had one legitimate daughter from her marriage:

- Eleanor of Alburquerque (c. 1374–16 December 1435). Married Ferdinand I of Aragon.

It was rumored that she also had an illegitimate daughter from an incestuous relationship with her half-brother, Ferdinand I

- Isabel of Portugal, Lady of Viseu (c. 1364 – 4 April 1435). Married Alfonso Enríquez, Count of Gijón and Noreña, natural son of Henry II of Castile.

== Sources ==
- Brochado da Mota, António (2011). Testamentos Régios – Primeira Dinastia (1109–1383) (Mestrado em História Medieval thesis). Lisbon: Universidade de Lisboa.
- Lopes, Fernão (1897). Chronica de El-Rei D. João I (PDF). Bibliotheca de Clássicos Portuguezes. Vol. III. Lisboa: Escriptorio.
- Lopes, Fernão (1895). Crónica de El-Rei D. Fernando (PDF). Bibliotheca de Clássicos Portuguezes. Vol. II. Lisboa: Escriptorio.
- Morujão, Maria do Rosário Barbosa, ed. (2010). Testamenta Ecclesiae Portugaliae (1071–1325). Lisbon: Centro de Estudos de História Religiosa. ISBN 978-972-8361-31-0.
- Muxagata, Ana Filipa Coelho (2019). A corte de D. Pedro I (1320–1367) (Mestrado em História thesis) (in Portuguese). Lisbon: Universidade de Lisboa.
- Olivera Serrano, César (2005). "Beatriz de Portugal. La pugna dinástica Avís-Trastámara" (PDF) (in Spanish).
- Ferreira, Sérgio Carlos (2007). Preços e Salários em Portugal na Baixa Idade Média (Mestrado em História Medieval e do Renascimento thesis) (in Portuguese). Porto: Faculdade de Letras da Universidade do Porto. doi:10.34626/pqf5-hm64.
- Russell, P. E. (1951). "Fernão Lopes e o Tratado de Santarém". Revista Portuguesa de História. 5. Coimbra: Instituto de Estudos Históricos Dr. António de Vasconcelos, Faculdade de Letras da Universidade de Coimbra: 455–473.
- Brásio, António (1958). "As «Razões» de João das Regras nas Cortes de Coimbra". Lusitania Sacra (in Portuguese). 3: 7–40. doi:10.34632/lusitaniasacra.1958.8237. ISSN 0076-1508.
- Livermore, H. V. (1969). A New History of Portugal. London: Cambridge University Press. ISBN 0-521-09571-9.
- Rodrigues Oliveira, Ana (2010). Rainhas medievais de Portugal. Dezassete mulheres, duas dinastias, quatro séculos de História (in Portuguese). Lisbon: A esfera dos livros. ISBN 978-989-626-261-7.
