= São Vicente, Guinea-Bissau =

São Vicente
- Village
- Location in Guinea-Bissau
- Coordinates: 12°13′57″N 15°45′22″W
- Country: Guinea-Bissau
- Region: Cacheu
- Sector: Bula
- Time zone: UTC+0 (GMT)

São Vicente is a village in the Cacheu Region of north-western Guinea-Bissau. It lies on the southern bank of the Cacheu River, to the east of Jolmete.
