= Cacheu and Cape Verde Company =

Portugal Chartered Company

- Native name: Companhia de Cacheu e Cabo Verde
- Company type: Chartered company
- Industry: International trade
- Founded: 3 January 1690; 335 years ago
- Defunct: 1703
- Fate: Contract not renewed by the Kingdom of Portugal
- Area served: Brazil; Cape Verde; Guinea-Bissau

The Cacheu and Cape Verde Company (Portuguese: Companhia de Cacheu e Cabo Verde) was a chartered company created by Portugal which operated the colonies of Cacheu and Cape Verde in the late 17th and early 18th centuries. It was created as part of the economic reforms of Luís de Meneses, 3rd Count of Ericeira, under King Peter II.

The company succeeded the Company of Cacheu and Rivers and Commerce of Guinea (which had ceased operating in 1682), with the same objectives: to improve the trade in manufactured goods, ivory, and slaves between the coast of Guinea (modern-day Guinea-Bissau), Cape Verde, and Brazil.

Created by Alvará Régio on 3 January 1690, it was initially successful, but then faced competition for the slave trade with the Spanish Americas between 1696 and 1703. In that year the Portuguese crown did not renew the contract for exploration. The Captaincy of Bissau was abandoned in 1707 as Fort Bissau was destroyed.

The decline in the company's activities resulted in an economic stagnation in the two African territories, which would only begin to recover decades later with the transfer of the company's rights to the Grão Pará and Maranhão General Company based in Brazil from 1757 to 1777. During the end of the Pombaline Era, the company became part of the Islands of Cape Verde, Bissau and Cacheu Chartered and Commerce Company.

== See also ==
- Portuguese Empire
- Company of Guinea
- Portuguese Guinea
- Portuguese Cape Verde
- List of Portuguese chartered companies
