= Bissorã =

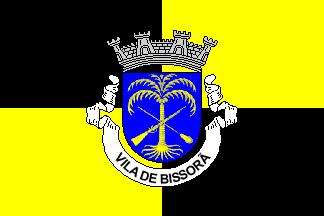
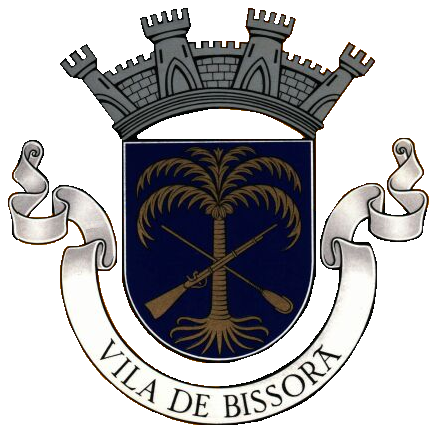
- Flag Coat of arms

- Location in Guinea-Bissau
- Coordinates: 12°2′24″N 15°25′41″W
- Country: Guinea-Bissau
- Region: Oio Region

Population (2008 (est))
  - Total: 11,964

Bissorã is a town located in the Oio Region of Guinea-Bissau. Population 11,964 (2008 est).

== History ==
After the abrupt independence from Portugal in 1974 due to Lisbon's Carnation Revolution, many of the Guinean black soldiers who served in the Portuguese Army and who had fought against the independence guerrillas were disarmed and left behind. Several thousand of them were executed by the new ruling power of Guinea-Bissau, the PAICG. A small number had managed to emigrate previously to Portugal or to other African nations. The most famous massacre occurred in Bissorã. In 1980 PAIGC admitted in its newspaper Nó Pintcha (dated 29 November 1980) that many were executed and buried in unmarked collective graves in the woods of Cumerá, Portogole and Mansabá.

== Sister cities ==
Bissorã is twinned with:

- Braga, Portugal
- Loulé, Portugal
