= Rio de Canjambari =

Coordinates: 12°29′N 15°11′W

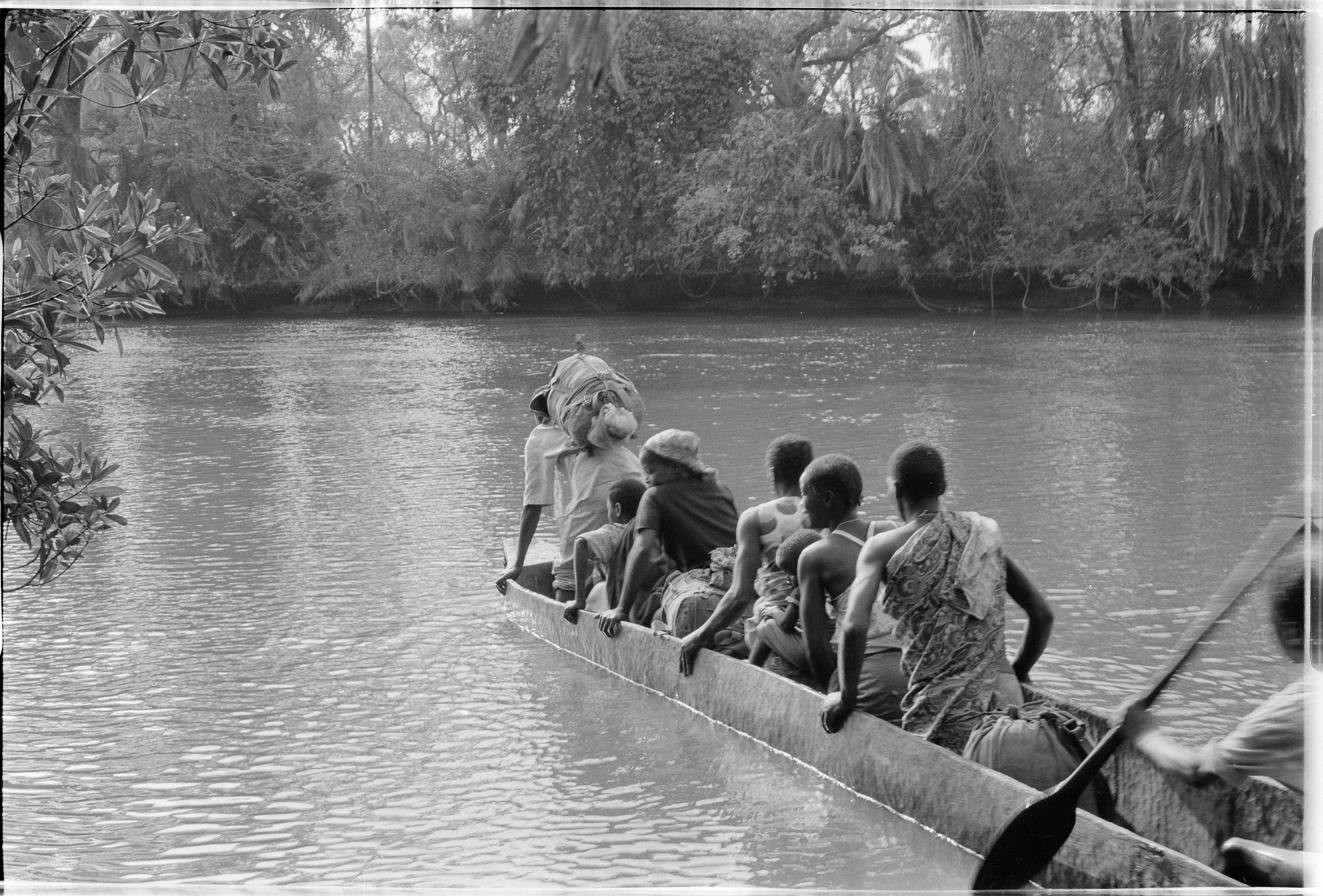
- Canjambari, Guinea-Bissau. Canoeing across the river, 1973

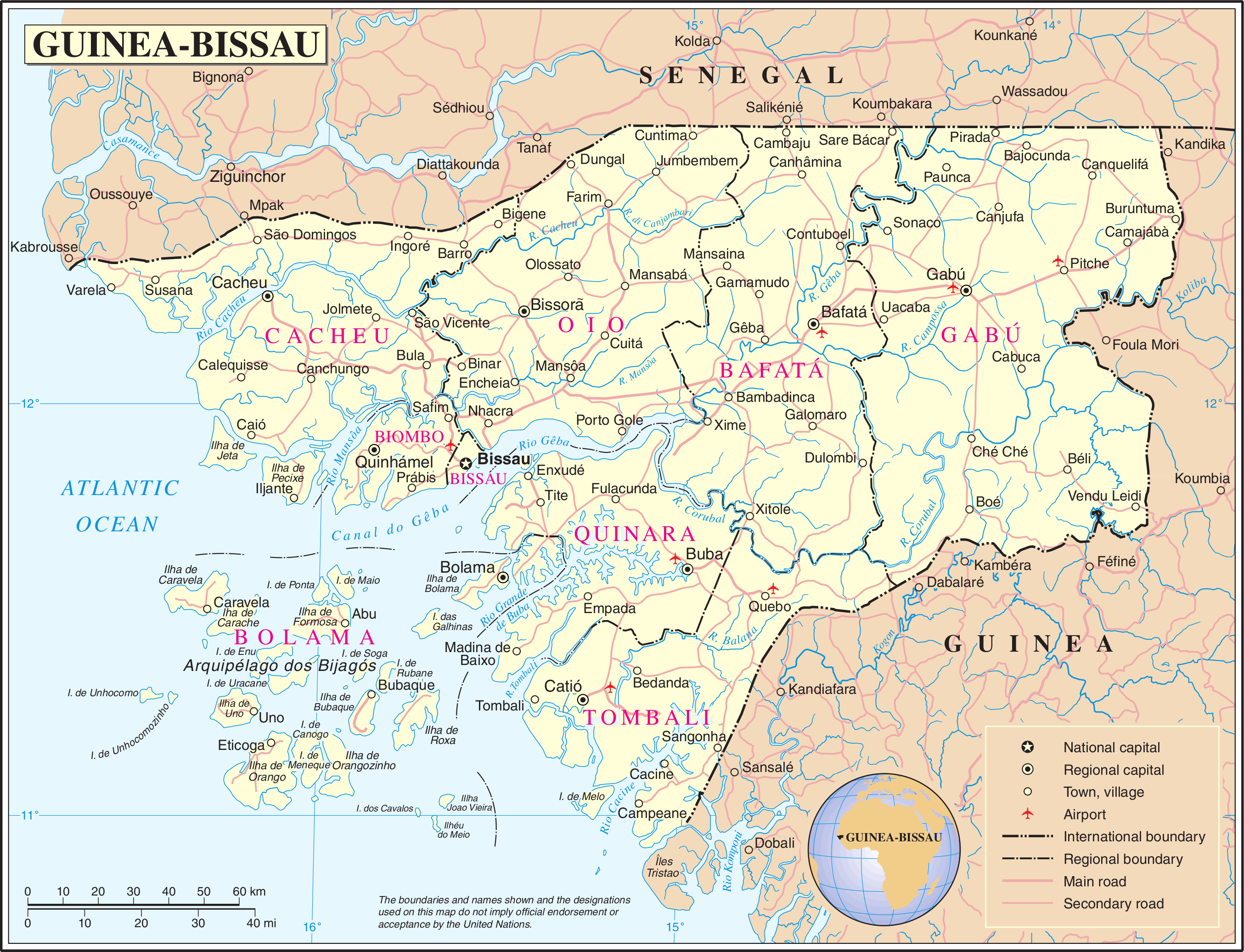

Location
- Country: Guinea-Bissau
- Region: Oio Region
- City: Farim

Physical characteristics
- Source: Guinea-Bissau
  - location: Guinea-Bissau
- Mouth: Rio Cacheu/Rio Farim
  - location: 12° 29' 2.00" N -15° 13' 18.01" W, Guinea-Bissau
- Discharge
  - location: Farim

Basin features
- Tributaries
  - right: Rio Cacheu / Rio Farim

The Rio de Canjambari is a river which flows through the Oio Region of Guinea-Bissau. It is a tributary of the Farim River. Its course is characterized by a savanna climate.
