= Cacheu River Mangroves Natural Park =

National park in Guinea-Bissau

- Location within Guinea-Bissau
- Location: Guinea-Bissau
- Nearest city: Cacheu
- Coordinates: 12°18′00″N 16°10′46″W
- Area: 886 km^{2} (342 sq mi)
- Established: 2000

Designations

Ramsar Wetland
- Official name: Parc Naturel des Mangroves du Fleuve Cacheu (PNTC)
- Designated: 22 May 2015
- Reference no.: 2229

The Cacheu River Mangroves Natural Park (Portuguese: Parque Natural dos Tarrafes do Rio Cacheu) is a national park situated on the Cacheu River in Guinea-Bissau. It was established on 1 December 2000. The national park, which has an area of 886 km^{2}, has been designated as a Ramsar site since 2015.

The park is considered to be the largest compact mangrove environment in West Africa, with as much as 68% of its territory covered with mangroves.

These vast mangroves provide the habitat for conservation of marine life and the preservation of the diversity of flora and fauna. The park becomes home to a large number of migratory birds, that come here to winter.

== Climate change ==
In 2022, the IPCC Sixth Assessment Report included Cacheu River Mangroves Natural Park in the list of African natural heritage sites which would be threatened by flooding and coastal erosion by the end of the century, but only if climate change followed RCP 8.5, which is the scenario of high and continually increasing greenhouse gas emissions associated with the warming of over 4 °C., and is no longer considered very likely. The other, more plausible scenarios result in lower warming levels and consequently lower sea level rise: yet, sea levels would continue to increase for about 10,000 years under all of them. Even if the warming is limited to 1.5 °C, global sea level rise is still expected to exceed 2–3 m (7–10 ft) after 2000 years (and higher warming levels will see larger increases by then), consequently exceeding 2100 levels of sea level rise under RCP 8.5 (~0.75 m (2 ft) with a range of 0.5–1 m (2–3 ft)) well before the year 4000.
