= Cantanhede =

Cantanhede may refer to:

- Cantanhede, Portugal, a municipality in Coimbra District, Portugal
- Cantanhede, Maranhão, a municipality in Brazil

== See also ==
- Marquis of Marialva, hereditary title of the Counts of Cantanhede
