= Nhacra =

- Location in Guinea-Bissau
- Coordinates: 11°58′N 15°33′W
- Country: Guinea-Bissau
- Region: Oio Region

Nhacra is a town in the Oio Region of Guinea-Bissau.
