= Cumeré =

- Location in Guinea-Bissau
- Coordinates: 11°54′N 15°32′W
- Country: Guinea-Bissau
- Region: Oio Region

Cumeré is a town in the Oio Region of Guinea-Bissau.
