= Farim (crater) =

Crater on Mars

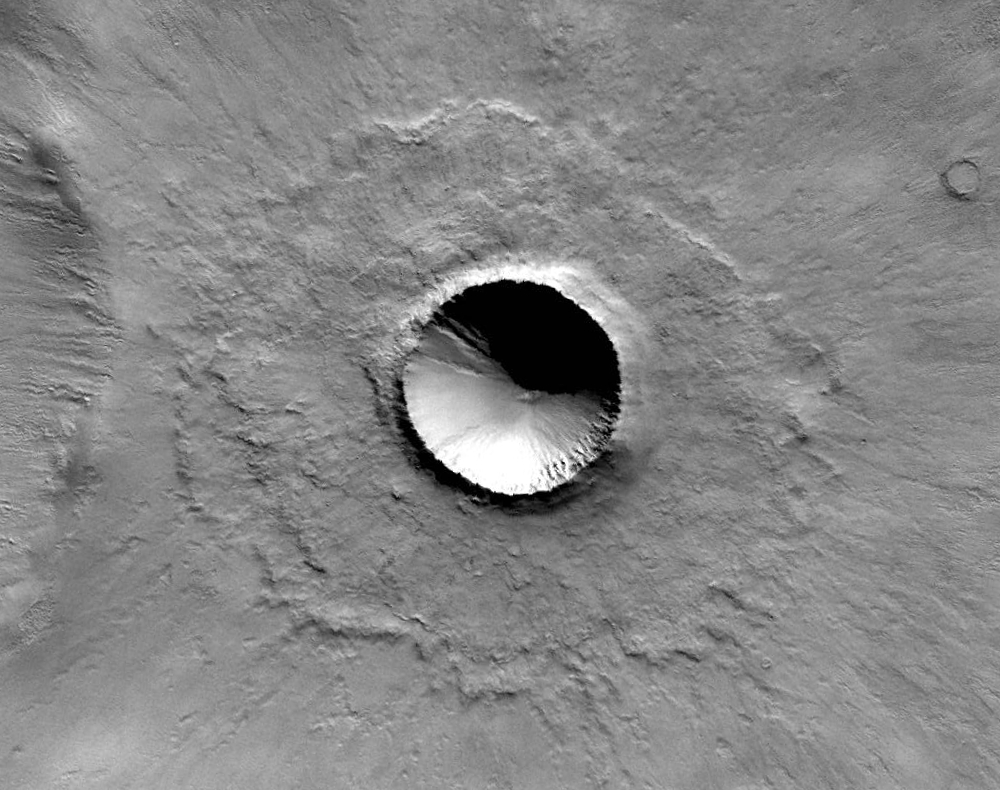
- December 2016 THEMIS image of Farim crater.
- Planet: Mars
- Region: Terra Cimmeria
- Coordinates: 44.32°S 139.28°E
- Quadrangle: Eridania
- Diameter: 3.92 km (2.44 mi)
- Eponym: Farim, Guinea-Bissau

Farim is the name of an impact crater on the planet Mars, located inside a chain of unnamed craters bordering the northern rim of the larger Kepler crater. The crater's name, approved by the International Astronomical Union (IAU) on 11 March 2013, is derived from the town of Farim in Guinea-Bissau. Farim crater was described as a feature on Mars as early as 1971 in that year's edition of the Times Atlas of the World. It also recently became of interest to scientists working on the 2001 Mars Odyssey mission, after the spacecraft's THEMIS camera made two surveys of Farim in December 2016.

== Description ==
Farim crater is 3.92 kilometres (2.44 mi) wide, and forms part of a cluster of craters located directly north of Kepler crater in Terra Cimmeria, a mostly crater-dominated region of the planet. It is also located within the Eridania quadrangle. The crater has been described by NASA as "relatively new", with ejecta material surrounding the crater, including some visible across the floor of its northern neighboring unnamed crater, being identifiable in THEMIS imagery of Farim in December 2016. Ejecta from the crater can be seen as far as 3.92 kilometres (2.44 mi) away from the crater's rim, traversing the rim of the larger unnamed crater in which Farim resides. The crater was further described by NASA as possessing gullies within its rim, and "a bowl shape [that shows] there has been very little deposition of materials." The crater's age is unknown, but it is relatively younger in comparison to surrounding craters in the region.

== Gallery ==
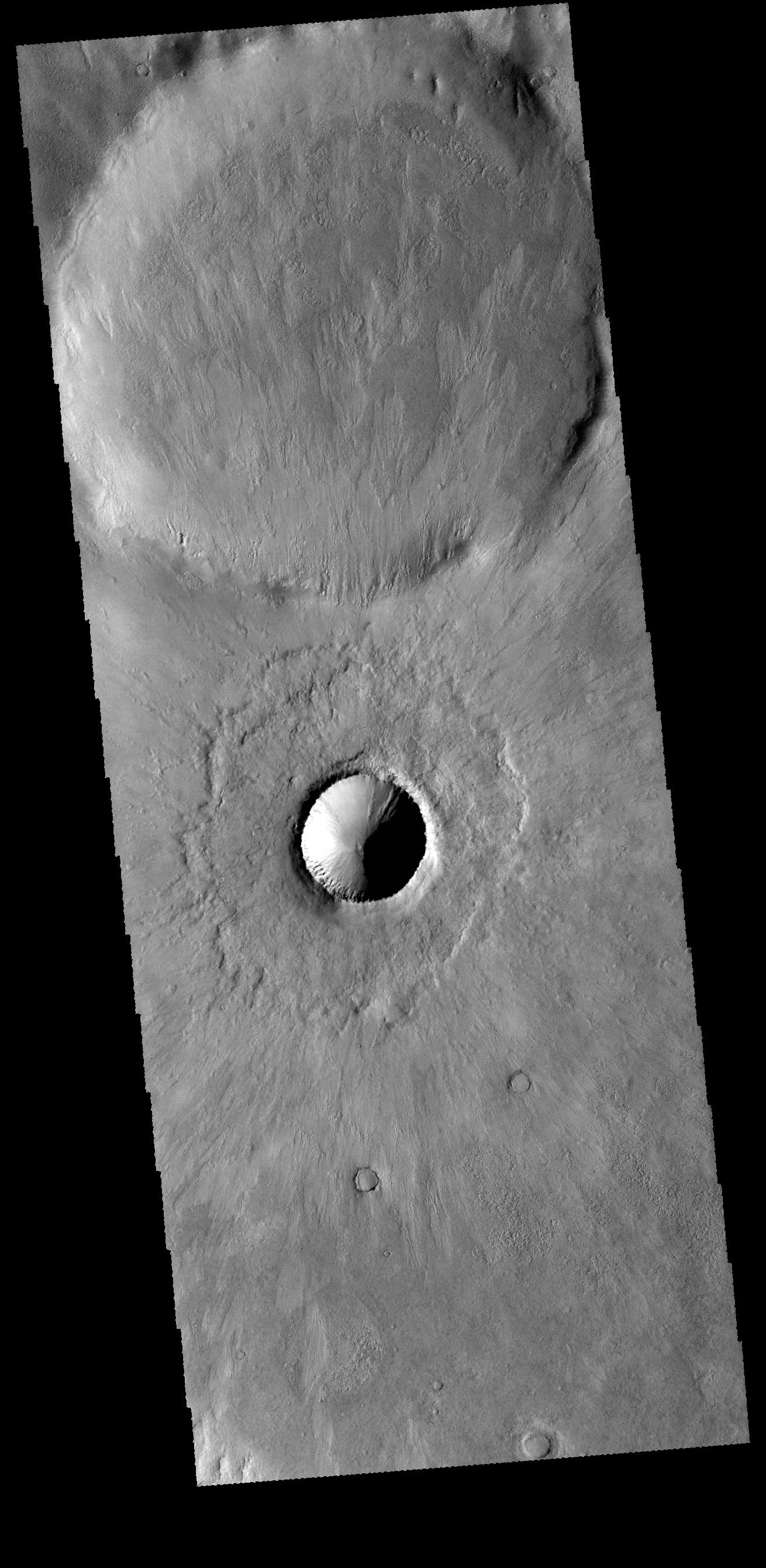
12 December 2016 survey of Farim by THEMIS

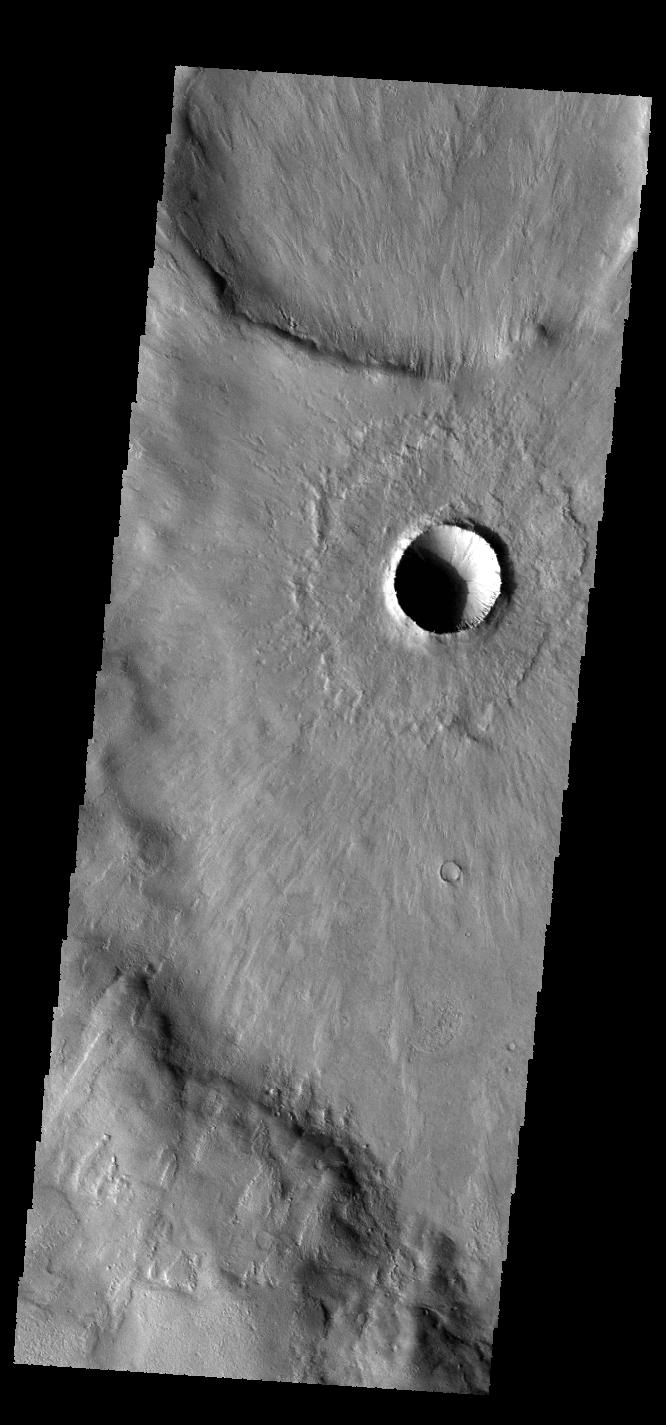
23 December 2016 survey of Farim by THEMIS

== See also ==
- List of craters on Mars: A-G
