= Mansaba =

Sector of Oio, Guinea-Bissau

- Sector
- Location in Guinea-Bissau
- Coordinates: 12°17′31″N 15°10′58″W
- Country: Guinea-Bissau
- Region: Oio
- Time zone: UTC+0:00 (GMT)

Mansaba is a Sector in the Oio Region of Guinea-Bissau.
