= Company of Cacheu and Rivers and Commerce of Guinea =

Portuguese colonial company in West Africa

The Company of Cacheu and Rivers and Commerce of Guinea (Portuguese: Companhia de Cacheu, rios e comércio da Guiné) was a Portuguese colonial company. It succeeded the Guinea Coast Company and was intended to promote trade in manufactured fabrics, ivory, and slaves in the Guinea region of West Africa.

== History ==
Plans for Portugal to set up a new monopolized company has been proposed by Duarte Nunez in 1654 and Manuel de Costa Pessoa in 1671. In 1664 an attempt was made to create a company to trade at Palmarin, but it was unsuccessful. After years of bureaucratic debates, the Portuguese monarchy established the Company of Cacheu and Rivers and Commerce of Guinea in 1675. Its privileges were confirmed on May 19, 1676 by Prince Regent Peter II, namely the right to trade slaves and other products off the coast of Guinea and the Cape Verde islands, as well as exporting said products to the Americas. However, 1/3rd of the company's ships were reserved for Cape Verde residents who could have their own products shipped within the scope of a guaranteed right to free trade in the area. The Cape Verde residents had a large degree of autonomy, with the only exception of being prohibited to deal with foreigners. Such amends to the company's regulations were mainly the doing of Cape Verde governor at the time, João Cardoso Pissaro.

The company's first captain-major, Antonio de Barros Bezerra, served for four years before being arrested for corruption and illegal trade with foreign ships, but was acquitted. Although it served as a prominent middleman in coastal trade, the company was never able to establish the true monopoly that it and the Portuguese Conselho Ultramarino had envisioned upon its creation, and it ceased activities in 1682, being succeeded by the Cacheu and Cape Verde Company from 1690 onwards.
