= Mansôa =

- Location in Guinea-Bissau
- Coordinates: 12°04′0″N 15°19′0″W
- Country: Guinea-Bissau
- Region: Oio Region

Population (2008 est.)
  - Total: 7,376

Mansôa is a town located in the Oio Region of Guinea-Bissau. Population 8,313 (2009 est). The Sua language is spoken in Mansôa.

== Geography ==
Mansôa is located 60 km east of the capital Bissau.
