= Cantanhede, Maranhão =

Coordinates: 3°39′S 44°24′W

Cantanhede
- Municipality
- Flag
- Interactive map of Cantanhede
- Country: Brazil
- Region: Nordeste
- State: Maranhão
- Mesoregion: Norte Maranhense

Population (2020)
  - Total: 22,117
- Time zone: UTC−3 (BRT)

Cantanhede is a municipality in the state of Maranhão in the Northeast region of Brazil.

== See also ==
- List of municipalities in Maranhão
