= Oio region =

Region of Guinea-Bissau

Coordinates: 12°15′N 15°15′W

Oio Woye
- Region
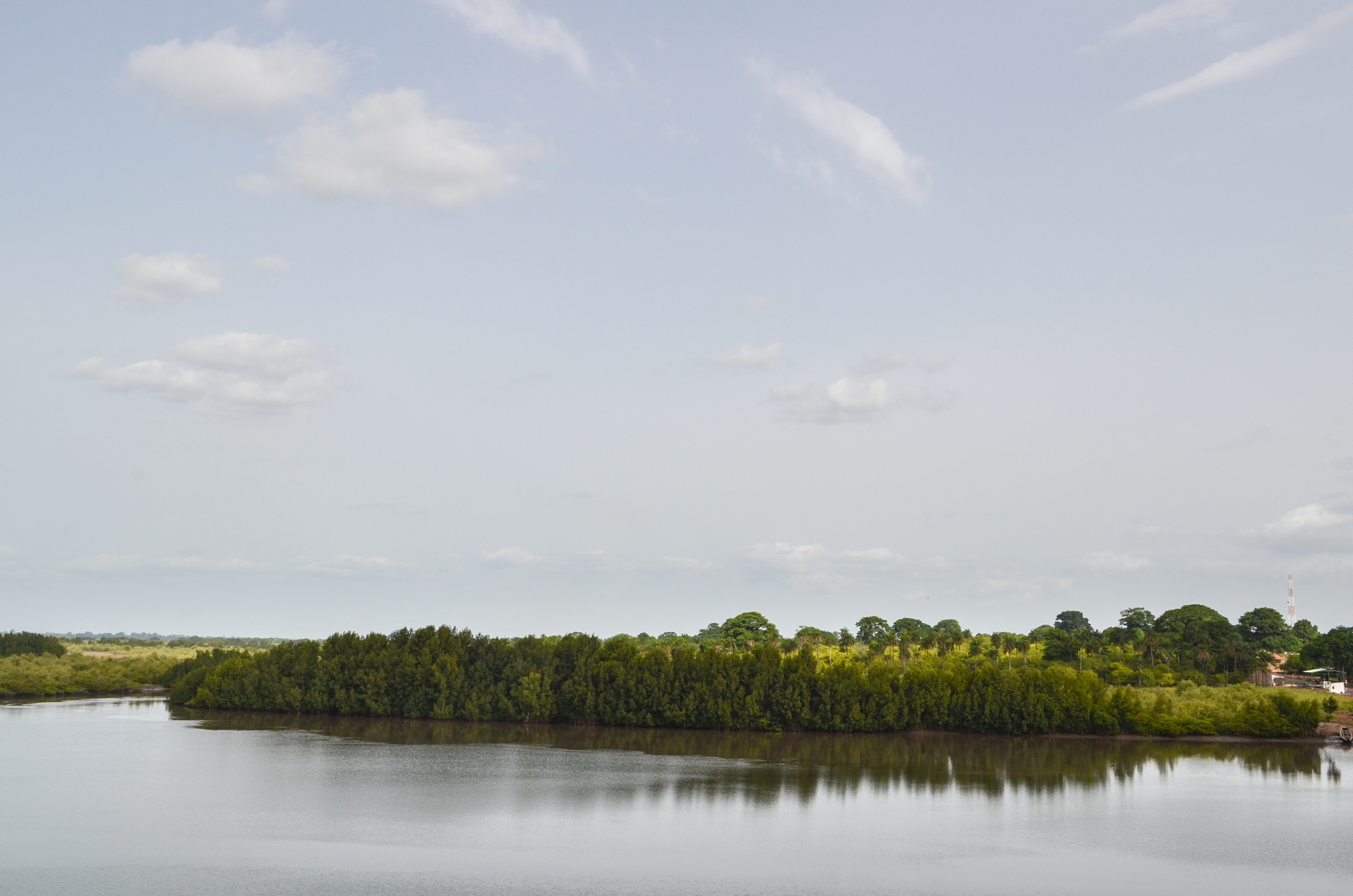

- Oio Region
- Country: Guinea-Bissau
- Seat: Farim
- Sectors: Bissorã, Farim, Mansaba, Mansôa, Nhacra

Area
  - Total: 5,403.4 km^{2} (2,086.3 sq mi)

Population (2009 census)
  - Total: 224,644
  - Density: 41.575/km^{2} (107.68/sq mi)
- ISO 3166 code: GW-OI

Oio (historically Woye) is a region in Guinea-Bissau. Its capital is Farim. Other major cities and towns include Nhacra, Mansôa, Bissorã and Cumeré. The region borders Senegal to the north, the Guinea-Bissau regions of Bafatá, Bissau and Biombo to the east, the Rio Geba/Guinea-Bissau region of Quinara to the south and the Guinea-Bissau region of Cacheu to the west. There has not been any local administration since the civil war of 1998-99 and all the social services are done by organs of civil society and other government agencies. It is a coastal region covered with Mangrove swamps, rain forest and tangled forest and receives an annual rainfall of more than 1,000 mm (39 in), while the inland has savannah woodlands.

As of 2009, the total population of the region was 215,259, with the urban population being 32,907 and rural being 182,352. As of 2009, the net activity rate was 50.63 per cent, proportion of employed labour force was 35.98 per cent, proportion of labour force was 73.53 and the proportion of potentially active population was 35.98 per cent. The sex ratio of the region is 92 females for every hundred males. The absolute poverty rate, people earning less than $2 a day, in the region stood at 79.6 per cent, with a regional contribution of 18 per cent to the national poverty totals.

== Geography ==
All the inland regions have a maximum elevation of 300 m (980 ft). The internal region has plains, which are interspersed with rias. There are lot of meandering rivers, many of them forming estuaries in the coastal regions. The principal river, Rio de Canjambari, flows through the region. The climate is hot and tropical and the region has two seasons. The onset of summer is from December to May with April - May period having temperature ranges from 20 °C (68 °F) to 30 °C (86 °F). The rainy season is usually from May to November. The region receives an average rainfall of around 1,000 mm (39 in) compared to the coastal regions, which receive 2,000 mm (79 in). The internal regions are covered with savannah or light savannah woodland.

== Administration ==
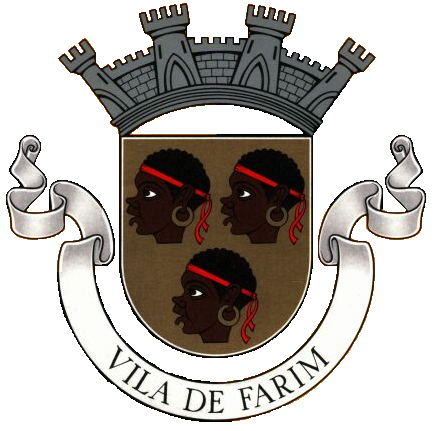
Coat of Arms during Portuguese Rule

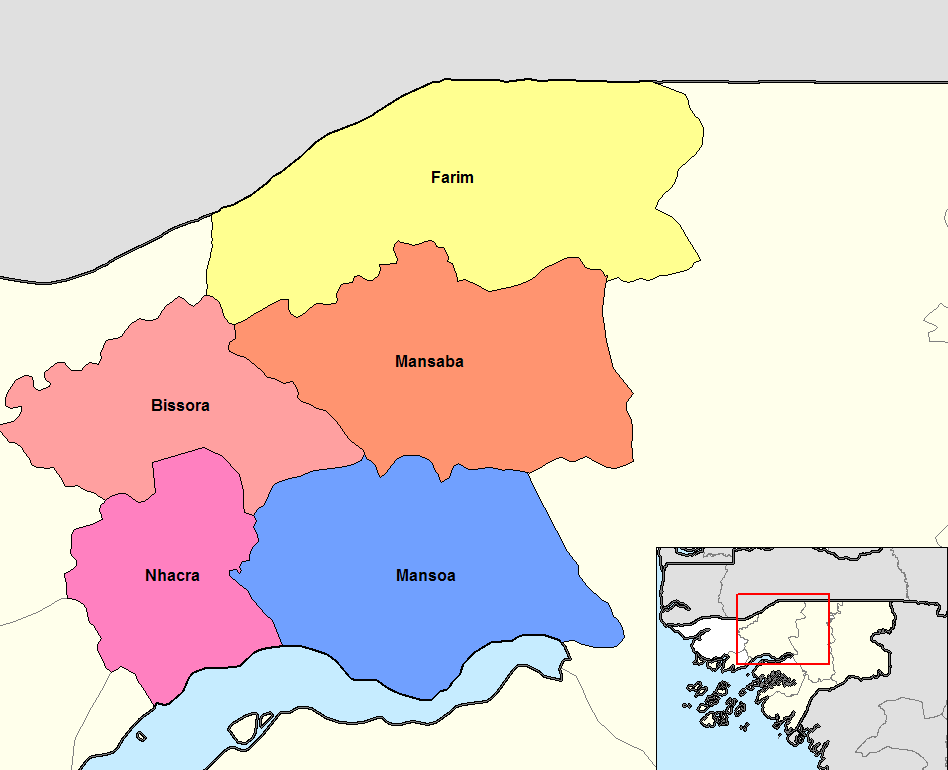
Sectors of Oio

Oio is divided into five sectors, namely, Bissorã, Farim, Mansaba, Mansôa and Nhacra. Guinea-Bissau got independence from Portugal on 24 September 1973 after wars and diplomatic political actions under the Partido Africano da Independência da Guiné e Cabo Verde (PAIGC), while Portugal accepted the independence of Cape Verde on 5 July 1975. PAIGC ruled both the countries after independence. While international funds came pouring in for the economic development of the nation, the party was accused of misusing power in authoritarian manner. The one-party state mechanism was turbulent during the period of 1980s and 1990s with army taking control of power more frequently and the resultant civil war resulted in loss of property and lives. To decentralize power, an administrative region and eight regions were created. There has not been any local administration since the civil war of 1998-99 and all the social services are done by organs of civil society and other government agencies. There is minimal health and education services offered by the government and all the government departments have operated in a limited fashion. A transitional government was selected during 2003–4 with an adopted Public Transition Charter. The Military Committee appointed two civilians as interim President and Prime Minister. Elections were held for a five-year term on 24 July 2005 with a multi party representation. There was a military coup in 2012, after which EU and international donations stopped. The latest elections were held during April 2014 with 13 Presidential candidates and representation from 15 parties. The elections were monitored by 550 international observers. Jose Mario Vaz and his party, won the Presidential and parliamentary elections against the military backed Nuno Gomes Nabiam.

== Demographics ==
Historical population
Year	Pop.	±%
2005	200,545	—
2006	204,146	+1.8%
2007	207,798	+1.8%
2008	211,502	+1.8%
2009	215,259	+1.8%
2010	219,068	+1.8%
2011	222,930	+1.8%
2012	226,846	+1.8%

As of 2009, the total population of the region was 215,259, with the urban population being 32,907 and rural being 182,352. The sex ratio of the region is 92 females for every hundred males. The total resident population in the region is 215,259. The total agricultural population in the region is 53,810. The average number of household in the region is 9.5 and the density of the population is 39.8 km^{2}. The intercensal rate of average annual growth (adjusted data) is 2.05 per cent. The non-agricultural population in the country is 161,449. The total number of households per capita in the region is 22,777. The fraction of Christians in the region is 15.8 per cent, Muslims is 42.10 per cent, animists is 20.80 per cent, not detailed was 20.50 per cent and people following no religion was 0.9 per cent.

Faith	Percentage
Christian	15.8%
Muslim	42.1%
Animist	20.8%
Not Detailed	20.5%
No Religion	0.9%

== Economy ==
As of 2009, the net activity rate was 50.63 per cent, proportion of employed labour force was 35.98 per cent, proportion of labour force was 73.53 and the proportion of potentially active population was 35.98 per cent. The major economic activity in the parts around the rivers and the coastal areas was fishing, while it was agriculture in the inland areas. As of 2011, the total population which was active constitutes 60 per cent nationwide indicating there are lot of employed people. But the poverty rate was very high in the country with an estimated two-thirds below the poverty line. Out of the working population, an estimated 58.4 per cent are employed in freelance activities, while wage earners formed 42 per cent. The unemployment in the region as of 2001 was 10.2 per cent, compared to the capital Bissau which has 19.3 per cent. Totally 63.5 per cent were employed in agriculture (including forestry), 8.9 in industry and 6.1 per cent in public administration. As per IMF report in 2011, people who were engaged in agriculture were poorer compared to others, while educated and higher educated people earned more. The absolute poverty rate, people earning less than $2 a day, in the region stood at 79.6 per cent, with a regional contribution of 18 per cent to the national poverty totals.
