= Cacheu =

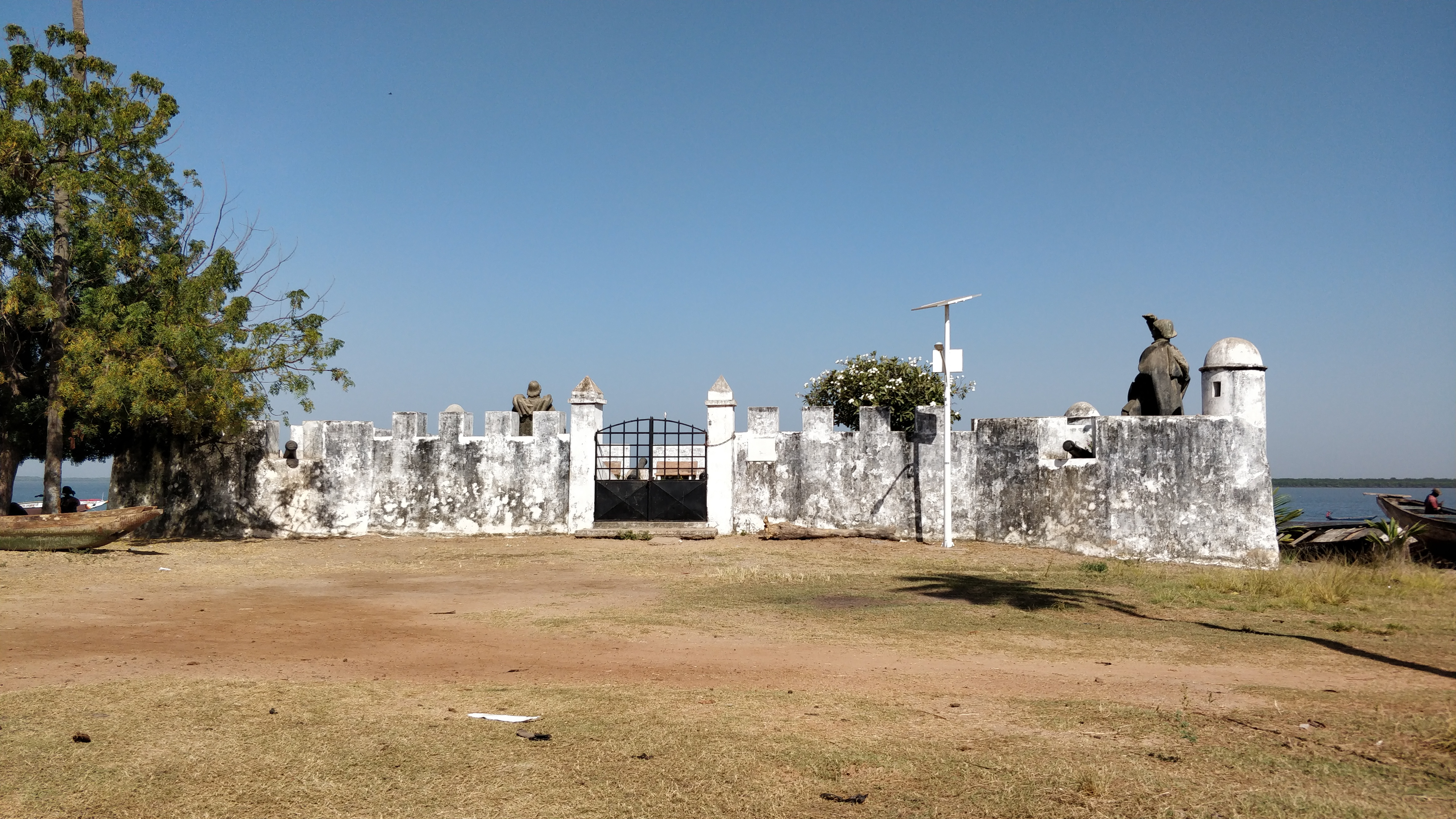
- Fortress of Cacheu

- Location in Guinea-Bissau
- Coordinates: 12°16′14″N 16°09′57″W
- Country: Guinea-Bissau
- Region: Cacheu Region
- Captaincy founded and fort built: 1588
- Incorporated (town): 1605
- Elevation: 44 m (144 ft)

Population (2009 census)
  - Total: 9,882

Cacheu is a town in northwestern Guinea-Bissau lying on the Cacheu River, capital of the eponymous region. Its population was estimated to be 9,849 as of 2008.

== Etymology ==
The town of Cacheu is situated in territory of the Papel people. The name is of Bainuk origin: Caticheu, meaning 'the place where we rest'.

== History ==
Cacheu was one of the earliest European colonial settlements in sub-saharan Africa, due to its strategic location on the Cacheu River. Cacheu developed a European/Afro-European population from the late sixteenth century through informal settlement of Cape Verdian and Portuguese traders, adventurers and outcasts (lançados). The authorities in mainland Portugal also sent to Cacheu degredados - people condemned to exile for a variety of offences.

In 1567 the English slaver John Hawkins raided the settlement. Due to such threats and a period of social conflict with their hosts the Papels, in 1589 the traders sought and received permission from the king of Cacheu to build a fort. They then abandoned the town and moved en masse into the new stockade in 1591 in an attempt to avoid the control of the local government. The Papels unsuccessfully stormed the fort before an agreement was reached allowing cohabitation. The fort did not have a secure water supply, however, and the locals used their control over water to pressure the Portuguese into trade concessions.

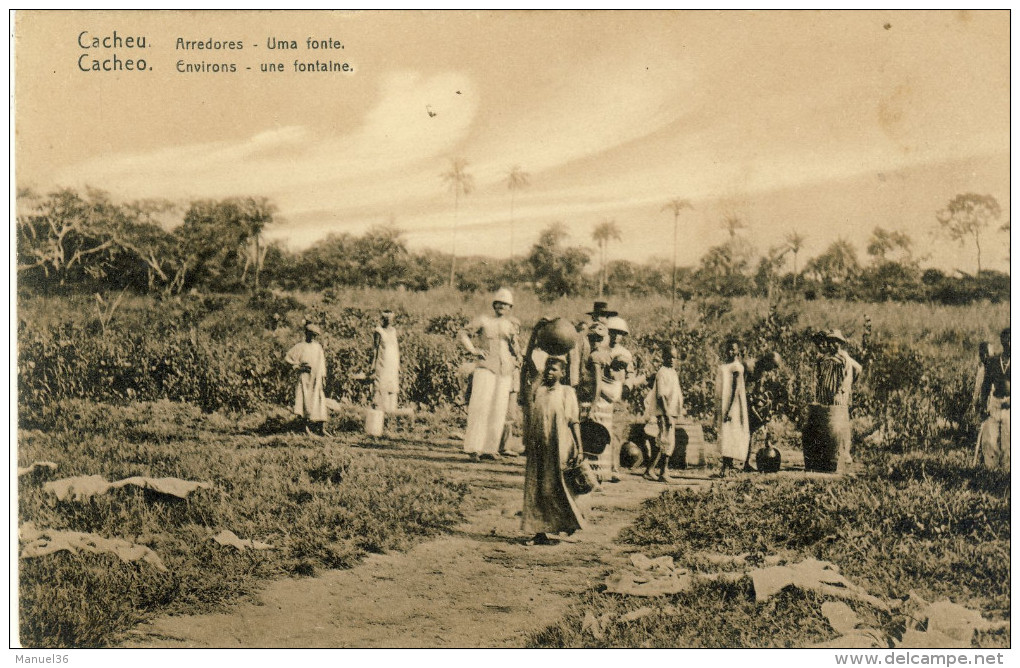
A well in Cacheu, circa 1900

In 1598 a resident priest was appointed, and in 1605 the settlement was offered a municipal charter by the Portuguese crown. At this time the settlement had around 1500 inhabitants, of whom 500 were white. A new fort, which still stands today, was built of stone in the 1640s.

Cacheu was an important slave trading point for the Portuguese in the Upper Guinea region, where the crown endeavoured to ensure that duties on all slaves exported were paid. It was also a center of boat-building, with most of the artisans being African. The lancados, Papels, and other European traders all regularly violated this supposed monopoly. To bolster these attempts, in 1676 the Portuguese launched the Company of Cacheu and Rivers and Commerce of Guinea, the first of several that tried and failed to control the trade of slaves from Cacheu to the New World. In 1684 a prominent lancado slave trader, Bibiana Vaz, even captured the captain-major and imprisoned him at Farim for 14 months. When representatives of the Company arrived, the 'Republic of Cacheu' refused to let them land, demanding control over trade and direct communication with the king. A triumvirate, which included Bibiana's brother, ruled the town "in the name of the people", meaning the Afro-Portuguese traders for several months before the company regained control.

The condition of the garrison deteriorated progressively from the latter part of the 17th century up through the 19th. In 1878, a reinforced Portuguese force successfully attacked Cacanda in retaliation for the earlier assassination of the captain-major of Cacheu, the first of a series of 'pacification campaigns' that would culminate in the final conquest of the region in 1914. As Portuguese Guinea expanded and solidified, however, towns such as Bolama, Bissau and Canchungo became administrative centers at the expense of Cacheu.

== Current attractions ==
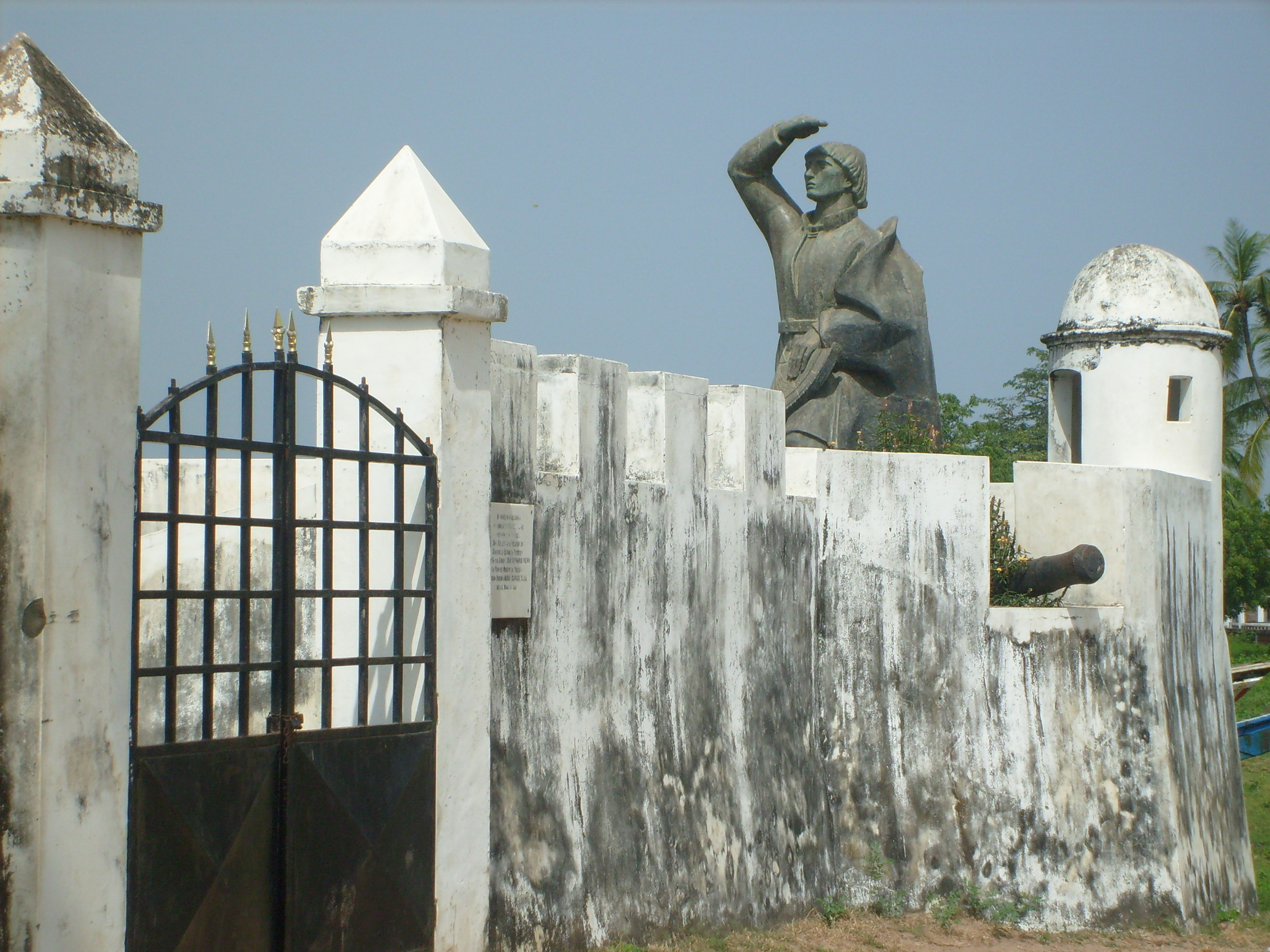
Cacheu Fort

Roads in the town are paved with oil palm kernels. Notable buildings in Cacheu include the Portuguese-built 16th-century fort, dating from the period when Cacheu was a centre for the slave trade. The Cacheu Memorial of Slavery & Black Traffic memorial museum (Memorial da Escravatura e Tráfico Negreiro de Cacheu) provides historical context to the area. Other attractions in the town include the Cacheu River Mangroves Natural Park and a regular market. The market serves the surrounding areas which export coconuts, palm oil and rice.

== International relations ==
=== Twin towns – Sister cities ===
Cacheu is twinned with:

- Lisbon, Portugal
