= Farim =

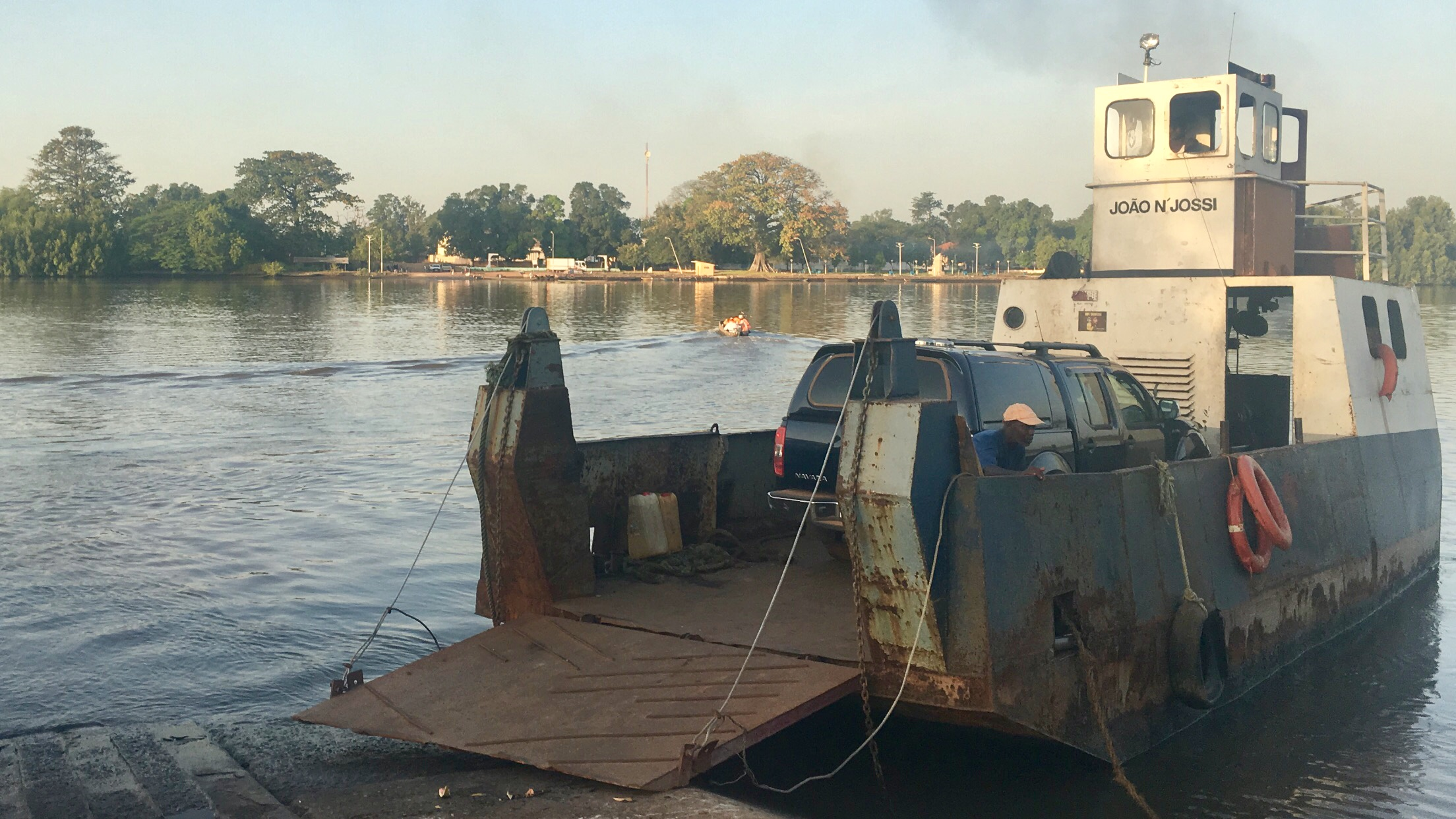
- Ferry service at Farim

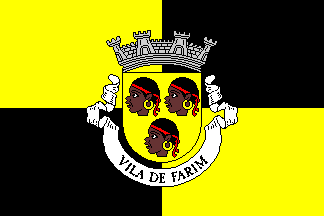
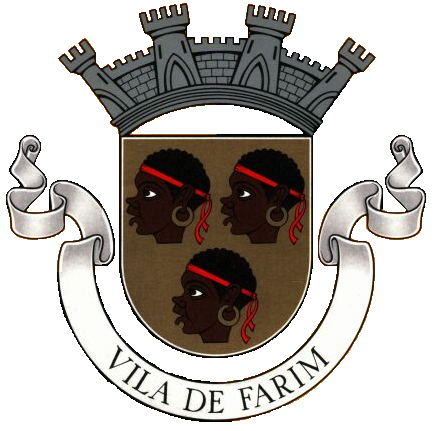
- Flag Coat of arms

- Location in Guinea-Bissau
- Coordinates: 12°29′2″N 15°13′18″W
- Country: Guinea-Bissau
- Region: Oio Region
- Founded: 1641
- Elevation: 2 m (6.6 ft)

Population (2009)
  - Total: 8,661

Farim is a town of northern Guinea-Bissau. It sits on the north bank of the Farim/Cacheu River, about 215 km (135 miles) up the river from Cacheu. Population 8,661 (2009 census).

== History ==
Farim was founded about 1641 by the Captain-Major of Cacheu, who recruited lançados from Geba to move to where they would be less vulnerable to attack by African tribes. The name derived from farim, the title of the local Mandinka ruler of Kaabu. For their part, the Mandinkas and Soninke called the settlement Tubabodaga ("village of the whites"). It was well-situated as a port, since the river was continuously navigable by sailing vessels from Cacheu.

In 1696 the local king of Canico attacked the Luso-African settlement at Farim, but was repulsed and eventually captured. The Captain-Major of Cacheu led a force of Papel and Balanta troops to destroy nearby villages and fortify the town, officially making it a presídio (garrisoned place) though an order dated 10 November 1696. Under diplomatic pressure from the Mansa of Kaabu, however, he released the king of Canico. Control of the region around Farim remained in the hands of the local kings, and Portuguese control was limited to the fortress. In the late 17th century, the Buramo King of Farim held significant control over the Cacheu River, with the exception of several islands at the mouth of the river, ruled by independent principalities.

It was a base for operations against Oio in 1897 and 1902. Farim started to grow in earnest in the 1910s, with over twenty trading firms based there, and became a vila (town) in 1918.

Farim had become a centro comercial by 1925, and experienced an influx of Lebanese and Syrian merchants, dealing in peanuts and timber. Its economy was hit hard by the independence struggle in the 1960s and 1970s.

== Sports ==
There are several sports clubs (notably football and athletics) in Farim, including SC Farim.

== Named after ==
A crater on Mars is named after the town.
