= Cacheu River =

River in Guinea-Bissau

Cacheu Farim
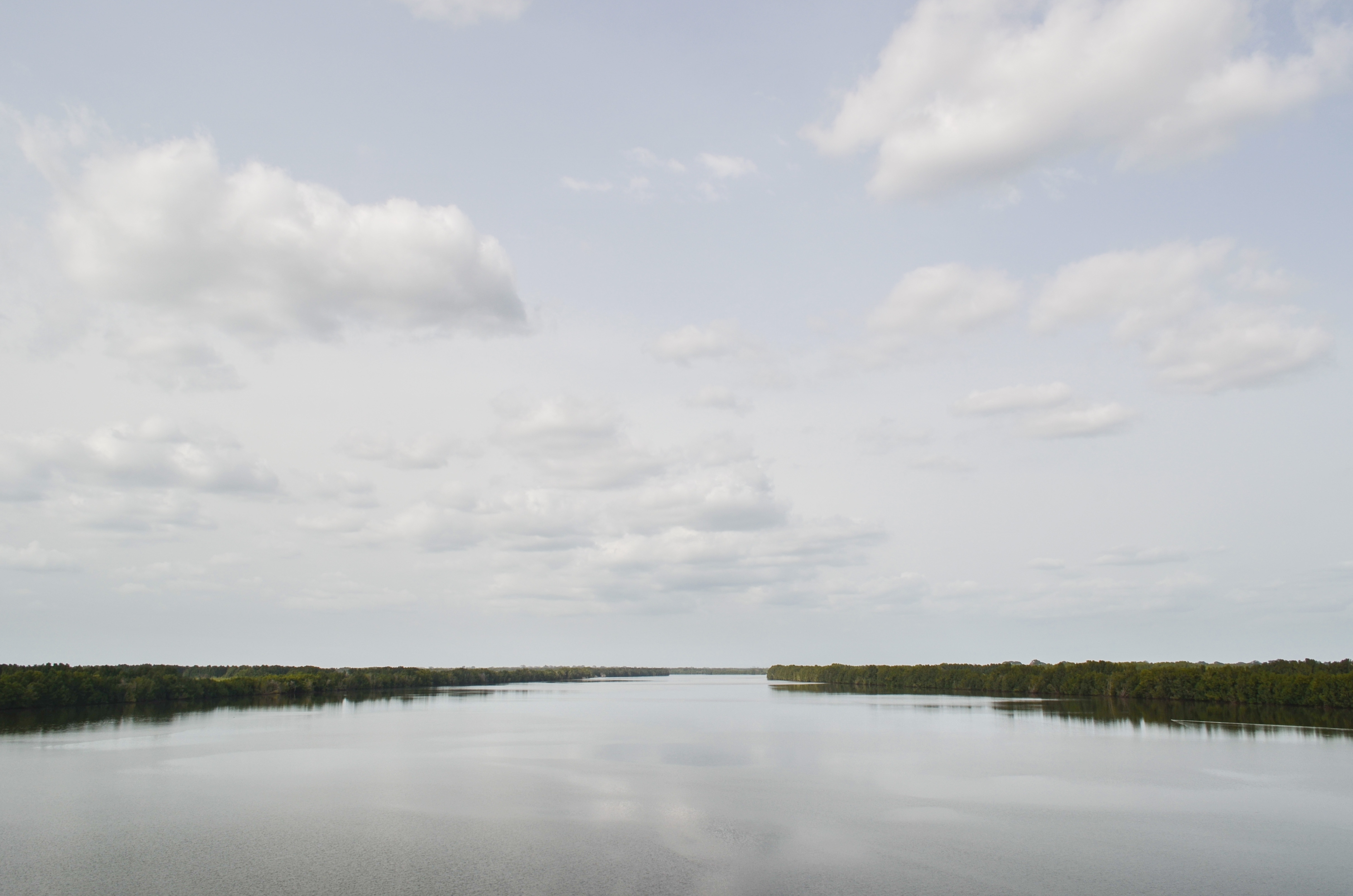
- View of the river near São Vicente, Guinea-Bissau

Location
- Country: Guinea-Bissau

Physical characteristics
- Source
  - location: North of Contuboel
  - coordinates: 12°23′N 14°34′W
- Mouth
  - location: Atlantic Ocean
  - coordinates: 12°11′16″N 16°18′53″W
  - elevation: 0 m (0 ft)
- Length: 257 km (160 mi)

Basin features
- Tributaries
  - left: Canjambari River
  - right: Ongueringao River, Elia River

The Cacheu (Portuguese: Rio Cacheu) is a river of Guinea-Bissau also known as the Farim along its upper course. Its total length is about 257 km. One of its major tributaries is the Canjambari River.

== Course ==
Its headwaters are near the northern border of the country, north of Contuboel and close to a bend of the Geba River. It runs west, by the town of Farim and close to Bigenè, and broadens into an estuary on whose south shore the town of Cacheu may be found. Elia Island is a fairly large island located on the right bank of the river close to its mouth. The island's western end lies east of the confluence with the Elia River with Ongueringao Island on the other bank.

1845 nautical chart of the Cacheo River from Farim to the coast

The Cacheu is navigable to large (2,000-ton) ships for about 97 km, and to smaller vessels much further; it was formerly an important route for commerce.

== History ==
During the Portuguese Colonial War, the Guinea-Bissau War of Independence, the river served several military operations.

In December 2000, a large part of the estuary of the river was designated as part of the Cacheu River Natural Park. 68% of the park features mango trees, which forms a part of a large block of the trees in West Africa.

== Bibliography ==
- Salif Diop, La côte ouest-africaine. Du Saloum (Sénégal) à la Mellacorée (Rép. de Guinée), ORSTOM, Paris, 1990, 380 pages
