= Operation Griffin (Portugal) =

- Part of Portuguese Colonial War and Guinea-Bissau War of Independence
Date	April 1966
Location	Guileje Corridor, Portuguese Guinea
Result	Indecisive

Belligerents
Portugal	(Guinea-Bissau) PAIGC

Commanders and leaders
(Portugal) Cap. Tinoco de Faria †	(Guinea-Bissau) Unknown

Units involved
(Portugal) Forças Armadas: (Portugal) Portuguese Army	Unknown

Strength
Unknown	Unknown

Casualties and losses
1 killed	5 killed

Operation Griffin (Portuguese: Operação Grifo) was an ambush organised by a squad of Portuguese paratroopers in southern Guinea to prevent the penetration of guerrillas from Guinea-Conakry into Portuguese controlled areas.
