= Sofia Pomba Guerra =

Portuguese feminist and anti-colonial campaigner

Sofia Pomba Guerra (1906 – 1976) was a Portuguese feminist and opponent of the Estado Novo government in Portugal. She was active in the anti-colonial movements of Mozambique and Guinea-Bissau.

== Early life ==
Maria Sofia Carrejola Pomba Guerra was born in Elvas in the Alentejo region of Portugal on the 18 July 1906. Her father was an army sergeant. She studied at the University of Coimbra during the 1920s, at the same time as Plato Zorai do Amaral Guerra who she later married. She obtained a degree in pharmacy in 1929. Because the Great Depression was making employment difficult to find in Portugal, after finishing their studies, she and her husband moved to the Portuguese colony of Mozambique in 1930, together with their young child. They initially settled in the interior town of Tete before moving to the capital Lourenço Marques (now Maputo) on the coast in 1932. While her husband found a job as a pharmacist, Guerra, with almost the same qualifications, would not find a government job for another decade.

== Mozambique ==
In Lourenço Marques she began to write articles for two periodicals, O Emancipador and Notícias, later contributing to a new monthly called Itinerário. The weekly magazine, O Emancipador, founded in 1919, was originally focused on union activity and workers' struggles in Lourenço Marques. But, when unions were controlled under the Estado Novo dictatorship, it became less radical and ended up being closed in 1937. Writing under the pseudonym of "Maria Rosa", her articles concentrated on the rights of women to work. Thus, they were feminist in their approach but, at this time, far from being revolutionary. In her articles she clearly drew a link between the opportunities for women's wage labour and their emancipation but the articles were primarily seeking to improve the position in Mozambique of white women who had some education, which was not the case of all whites as there was a large white, peasant underclass. The articles were not anti-colonial, and did not address the position of Africans or African women. It was only later that she would become a supporter of the anti-colonial struggle.

The newspaper, Notícias had pages dedicated to women that contained the traditional items related to fashion, etc. that were widely found in newspapers of the time, and did not challenge accepted practices. In advocating equality she was discussing issues still peripheral for the social scene of Lourenço Marques. By 1936 she was already publishing articles under her own name and in that year Notícias published an 18-article series called O Trabalho da Mulher (The work of a woman), on women's right to work. She emphasised that "women have the right to work and equal access to work and pay on the basis of equal aptitude". She argued that the 1933 Constitution introduced by the Estado Novo had loopholes designed to diminish the importance of women in government positions. At the time these articles were being published, Guerra was already showing awareness of some knowledge of Marxism, although she was far from embracing its ideas. In 1934, for example, she had written an article criticising the writing of Alexandra Kollontai that advocated women abandoning the home and their maternal obligations to dedicate themselves to the Revolution. In 1935, Guerra self-published a novel entitled Dois anos em África (Two years in Africa). It was much criticised for its content and literary style. In July 1936, the newspaper União, published an article that criticised Guerra's articles in Notícias, arguing that such views had no place in such a newspaper.

Organised by a group of Portuguese settlers, the magazine Itinerário, which was devoted to writing, art, science and criticism, was first published in February 1941. Despite the dominance of male contributors, the first issues both discussed the condition of women and had women as contributors, among whom was Guerra. After 1945, Itinerário reflected the initial feelings of revolt in Portugal at the end of World War II, which saw the Estado Novo having to temporarily relax its authoritarian stance. Itinerário became a focal point for opposition in Mozambique. The writings of Guerra revealed a move away from her earlier concentration on equality for white women to a greater appreciation of the issues facing Mozambique’s Africans and the need for the end of the colonial era. She was gradually moving into politics, as evidenced by her active support for the presidential campaign of José Norton de Matos in 1948 (Portuguese in the colonies could vote in national elections).

== Arrest and detention ==
In 1949 Guerra was the first white woman to be arrested in Mozambique and sent to back to Portugal, where she was detained at the Caxias political prison near Lisbon from 23 November of that year to 4 July 1950, when she was acquitted by the Lisbon Plenary Court. She then joined her husband, who had moved to Portuguese Guinea (now Guinea-Bissau), where they became owners of Farmácia Lisboa (The Lisbon Pharmacy). In Guinea she continued her revolutionary activities and tried to organize communist groups among the workers. She also supported the presidential campaign of Humberto Delgado in 1958.

== Guinea-Bissau ==
Although closely monitored by the political police, whose boss lived opposite her house, she resumed her political activities at the first opportunity. Guerra was linked to the creation of the Liberation Front of Guinea (Portuguese:Frente de Libertação da Guiné, FLG). Osvaldo Vieira an important figure of the African Party for the Independence of Guinea and Cape Verde, who gave his name to the international airport of Guinea-Bissau, worked for a time in her pharmacy. She also taught English in high school, in this way meeting several young revolutionaries, including Aristides Pereira, the first president of Cape Verde and Luís Cabral, the first president of Guinea-Bissau. Aristides Pereira said that she was the one who established contact between him and the leading anti-colonialist Amílcar Cabral, when Perreira arrived in Guinea in the early 1950s, while Luís Cabral described her as "the friend and advisor to each one of us". Guerra was to live with Amilcar Cabral in the 1960s.

== Death ==
Two years after the Carnation Revolution that overthrew the Estado Novo, Sofia Pomba Guerra died in Lisbon on 12 August 1976.
