= Osvaldo Vieira =

Bissau-Guinean pan-Africanist

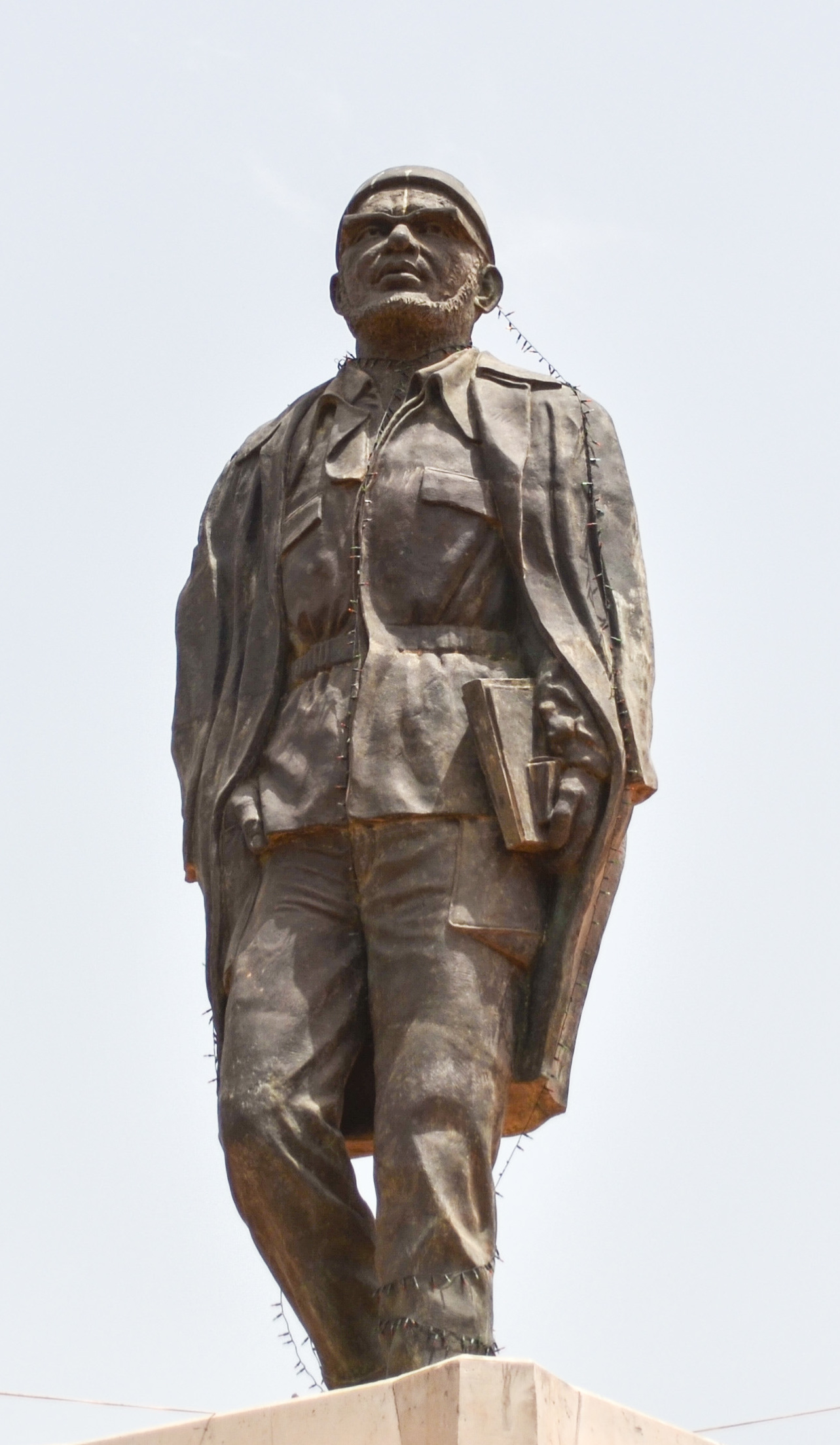
- A statue of Viera outside the airport in Bissau.

Personal details
- Born: Osvaldo Máximo Vieira; 1938 Bissau, Portuguese Guinea
- Died: 31 March 1974 (aged 35–36) Conakry, Guinea
- Resting place: Fortaleza de São José da Amura
- Party: African Party for the Independence of Guinea and Cape Verde

Osvaldo Máximo Vieira (1938 – 31 March 1974) was a Bissau-Guinean revolutionary and prominent military commander during the Guinea-Bissau War of Independence. He was the cousin of João Bernardo Vieira, who would later serve two separate terms as president.

Vieira was one of many early recruits from the so-called "revolutionary petty bourgeoisie", a group which Amílcar Cabral entrusted with instigating the war of independence. His father worked at the Sociedade Comercial Ultramarina, while his grandfather had worked in the postal service, owned land, and was considered a "small intellectual".

Before his revolutionary career, Vieira worked as a pharmacy assistant to Sofia Pomba Guerra, a white Portuguese feminist who was active in the burgeoning independence movements of Guinea-Bissau and Mozambique. In 1961, he, along with nine other young PAIGC fighters, trained at the Army Command College of the Chinese People's Liberation Army in Nanjing, China.

The Osvaldo Vieira International Airport in Bissau is named in his honour.
