= Guinea-Bissau War of Independence =

1963–1974 armed conflict in West Africa

- Part of the Portuguese Colonial War and the Cold War
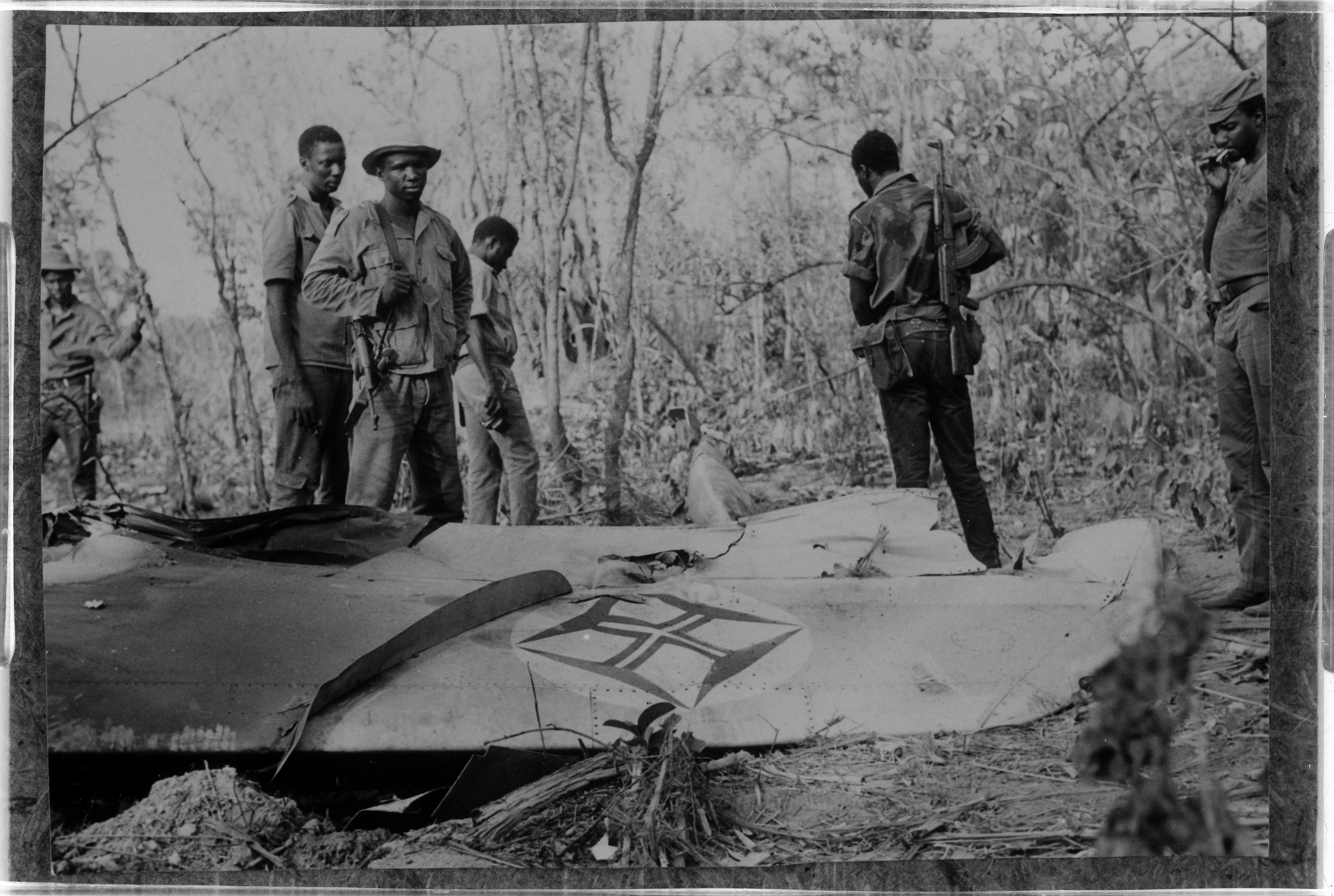
- PAIGC soldiers with a downed Portuguese aircraft, 1974
Date	January 23, 1963 – September 10, 1974 (11 years, 7 months, 2 weeks and 4 days)
Location	Portuguese Guinea (today Guinea-Bissau)
Result	Algiers Accord
Territorial changes	Independence of Guinea-Bissau and Cape Verde from Portugal

Belligerents
Portugal; Portuguese Guinea	PAIGC; Liberated Zones

Commanders and leaders
António de O. Salazar; Francisco Gomes (Estado Novo (Portugal)) António de Spínola	Amílcar Cabral X Luís Cabral; Aristides Pereira; João Bernardo Vieira; Francisco Mendes; Osvaldo Vieira #

Strength
~32,000	~10,000

Casualties and losses
2,069 killed 8,328 wounded	~6,000 killed
- 5,000 civilian deaths 7,447 African former Portuguese Army soldiers executed by PAIGC after the war.
- ^{a} Small expeditionary force of around 50–60 men

The Guinea-Bissau War of Independence (Portuguese: Guerra de Independência da Guiné-Bissau), also known as the Bissau-Guinean War of Independence, was an armed independence conflict that took place in Portuguese Guinea from 1963 to 1974. It was fought between Portugal and the African Party for the Independence of Guinea and Cape Verde (Partido Africano da Independência da Guiné e Cabo Verde, PAIGC), an armed independence movement backed by the Soviet Union, China, Cuba, Algeria and Guinea. The war is commonly referred to as "Portugal's Vietnam" because it was a protracted guerrilla war which had extremely high costs in men and material and which created significant internal political turmoil in Portugal.

After the assassination of PAIGC leader Amílcar Cabral in January 1973, the military conflict reached a stalemate: Portuguese forces were largely confined to major cities and various fortified bases and were patently unable to dislodge PAIGC from the so-called liberated zones. In September 1973, the PAIGC-dominated People's National Assembly unilaterally declared the independence of a new Republic of Guinea-Bissau; the declaration was recognised by several foreign countries. After the Carnation Revolution, the new Portuguese government agreed to grant independence to Guinea-Bissau in September 1974 and to Cape Verde a year later. PAIGC thus became the first sub-Saharan African liberation movement to achieve independence – if only indirectly – through armed struggle.

== Background ==
=== Portuguese colonialism ===
Portuguese Guinea (as well as the nearby Portuguese Cape Verde archipelago) had been claimed as a Portuguese territory since 1446 and was a major trading post for commodities and African slaves during the 18th century. However, the mainland was not fully "pacified" until the late 1930s, by which time the Portuguese regime of António de Oliveira Salazar was preoccupied with the development of its Angolan and Mozambican colonies. There were various changes to the colonies' legal status and governance structures during this period and in subsequent decades, but they were primarily "cosmetic" in effect.

In the phrase of Patrick Chabal, Guinea was "the smallest and most backward of the Portuguese colonies", partly due to its inhospitable climate and apparent dearth of natural and mineral resources. There were few European settlers in Guinea, and the footprint even of the Portuguese administration was minimal and "crude", remaining centralised under the governor. Portugal invested little in the colony and made only minor gestures towards promoting its economic and social development. Nonetheless, a colonial economy existed on the Guinean mainland, controlled primarily by the Companhia União Fabril and consisting primarily of cash crop exports; traditional Guinean economies were disrupted both by the imperative to cultivate export crops and by Portuguese taxation. Moreover, Portugal was attached even to its most "dispensable" colony, viewing its maintenance as integral to Portugal's hold on other more economically important colonies, particularly Angola and Mozambique.

=== Formation of PAIGC ===
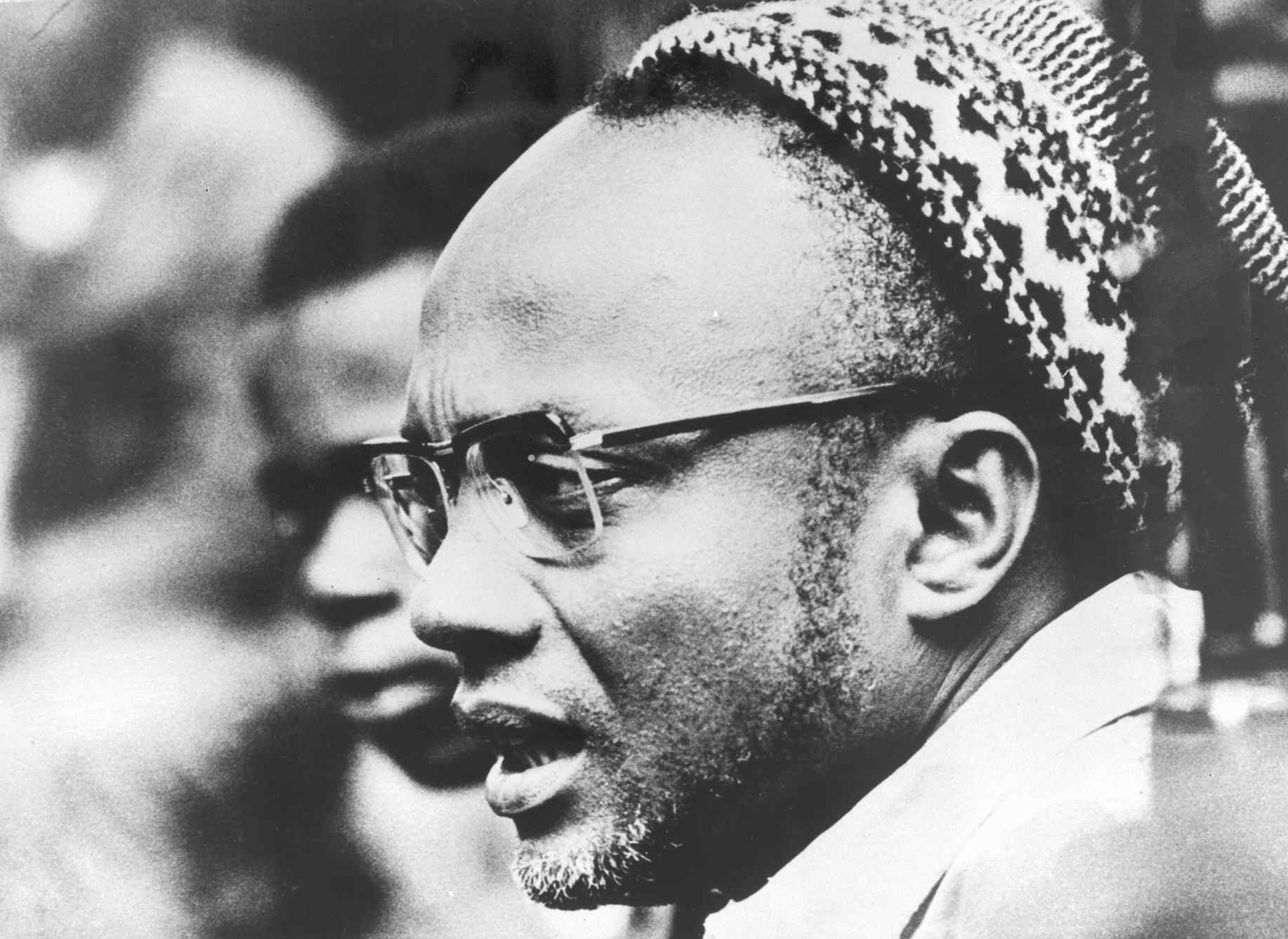
Revolutionary leader Amílcar Cabral, co-founder of PAIGC

The revolutionary insurgency which ultimately launched the war was led by the African Party for the Independence of Guinea and Cape Verde (Portuguese: Partido Africano da Independência da Guiné e Cabo Verde, PAIGC), a liberation movement founded in 1956 by Rafael Barbosa and nationalist intellectual Amílcar Cabral. From the outset, its main objectives were the unity of Guinea-Bissau and Cape Verde and their independence from Portuguese rule. In its first three years, PAIGC was preoccupied with mostly fruitless exercises in constitutional-legal agitation, concentrated in Bissau and other major cities and sometimes involving collaboration with local trade unions. However, on 3 August 1959, PAIGC was involved in organising a major dockworkers' strike at the Port of Bissau. The Portuguese authorities broke up the strike by force, leading to what became known as the Pidjiguiti massacre, in which at least fifty people were killed and several hundreds wounded.

The massacre led PAIGC to rethink its policies: in the aftermath, it reiterated its commitment to national liberation, but with a new emphasis on the political mobilisation of the rural peasantry. Cabral ordered the party to go underground and its political cadres to organise in exile in Conakry, the capital of the newly independent Republic of Guinea on the southern border of Portuguese Guinea. Between 1960 and 1963, PAIGC was "totally transformed" as it prepared for armed struggle against the Portuguese regime. Scores of cadres were trained in Conakry and sent to the Guinean countryside to mobilise the population, while the political leadership launched a diplomatic offensive that secured the full cooperation of the government in Conakry, the "tacit support" of the Senegalese government, and contacts with several other liberation movements and left-wing political parties.

On April 18, 1961 PAIGC together with FRELIMO of Mozambique, MPLA of Angola and MLSTP of São Tomé and Príncipe formed the Conference of Nationalist Organizations of the Portuguese Colonies (CONCP) during a conference in Morocco. The main goal of the organization was cooperation among the different national liberation movements in the Portuguese Empire. Also in 1961 PAIGC commenced sabotage operations in Guinea-Bissau. At the start of hostilities the Portuguese had only two infantry companies in Guinea Bissau and these concentrated in the main towns, giving the insurgents free rein in the countryside. The PAIGC blew up bridges, cut telegraph lines, destroyed sections of the highways, established arms caches and hideouts, and destroyed Fula villages and minor administrative posts. In late 1962 the Portuguese launched an offensive and evicted the PAIGC cadres that had not integrated with the local population. Open hostilities broke out in January 1963.

== Belligerents and forces ==
=== Liberation/PAIGC forces ===
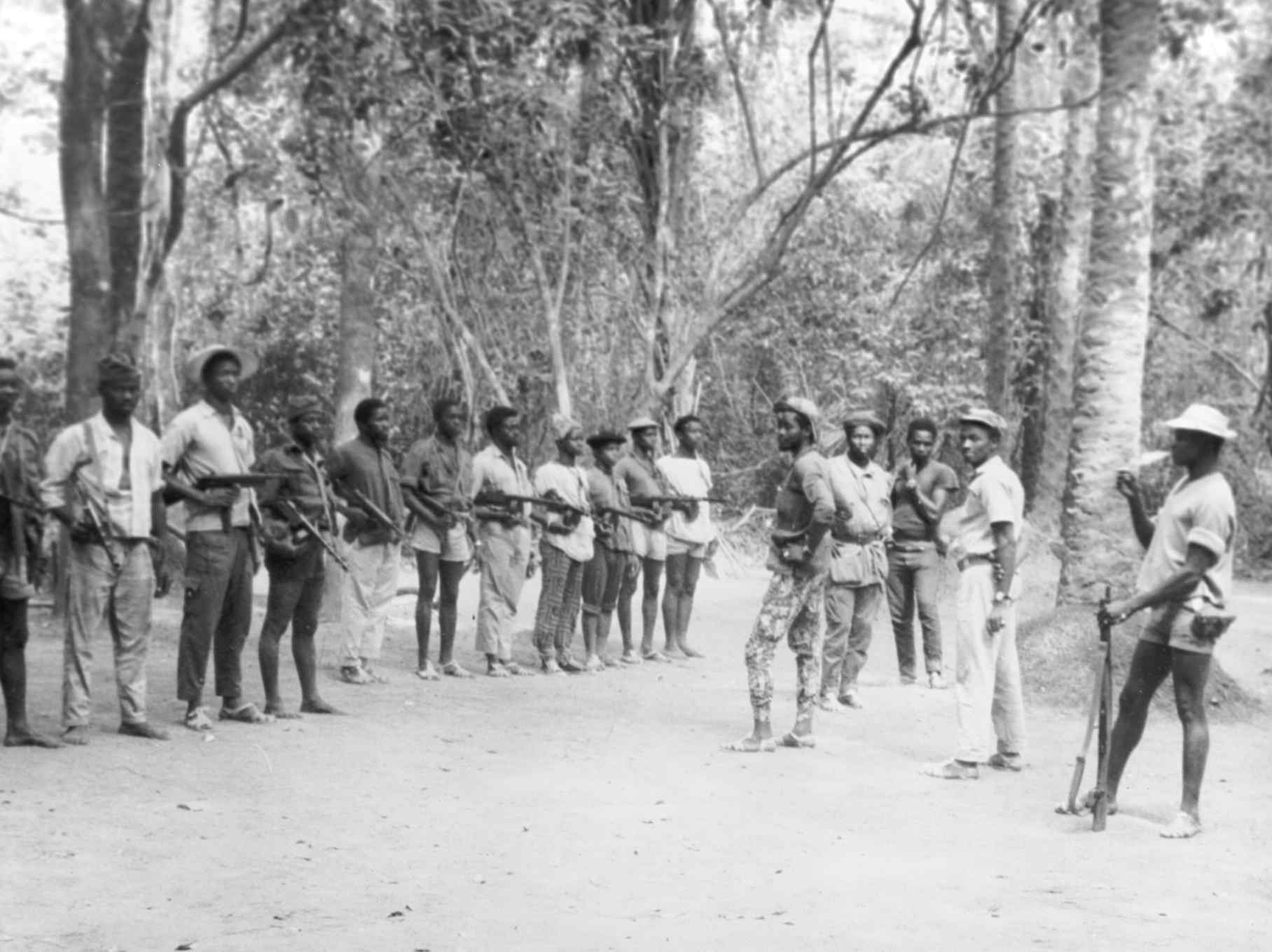
PAIGC guerrillas undergoing formation in the interior of Guinea-Bissau.

Guinea-Bissau's liberation movement was led and dominated by PAIGC, which was led by Cabral until his assassination in January 1973. By the early 1970s, PAIGC had the support of a majority of the Guinean population, but its combat strength was estimated at no more than 7,000. However, the movement was "well trained, well led, and well equipped", and its guerrilla campaign benefitted both from the terrain – its forces operated primarily from Guinea's dense jungles – and from external support.

==== Organisation ====
In 1964, PAIGC held its Cassaca Congress, which decided on reforms to discourage militarism inside the organisation. Thereafter the war effort was carried out not by autonomous guerrilla groups, but by guerrilla units within a nationwide army, the Revolutionary Armed Forces of the People (Forças Armadas Revolucionárias do Povo, FARP). From then until the close of the war, the basic fighting unit in FARP was the highly flexible "double group" (bi-grupo), which comprised two distinct commandos of 15 to 25 men each, normally operating together but also capable of remaining operational if separated (or if joined with other double groups). Also from 1964, PAIGC implemented what Chabal calls a "dual command" at all levels of its military apparatus: at every level, leadership was exercised jointly by two men, one military commander and one political commissar.

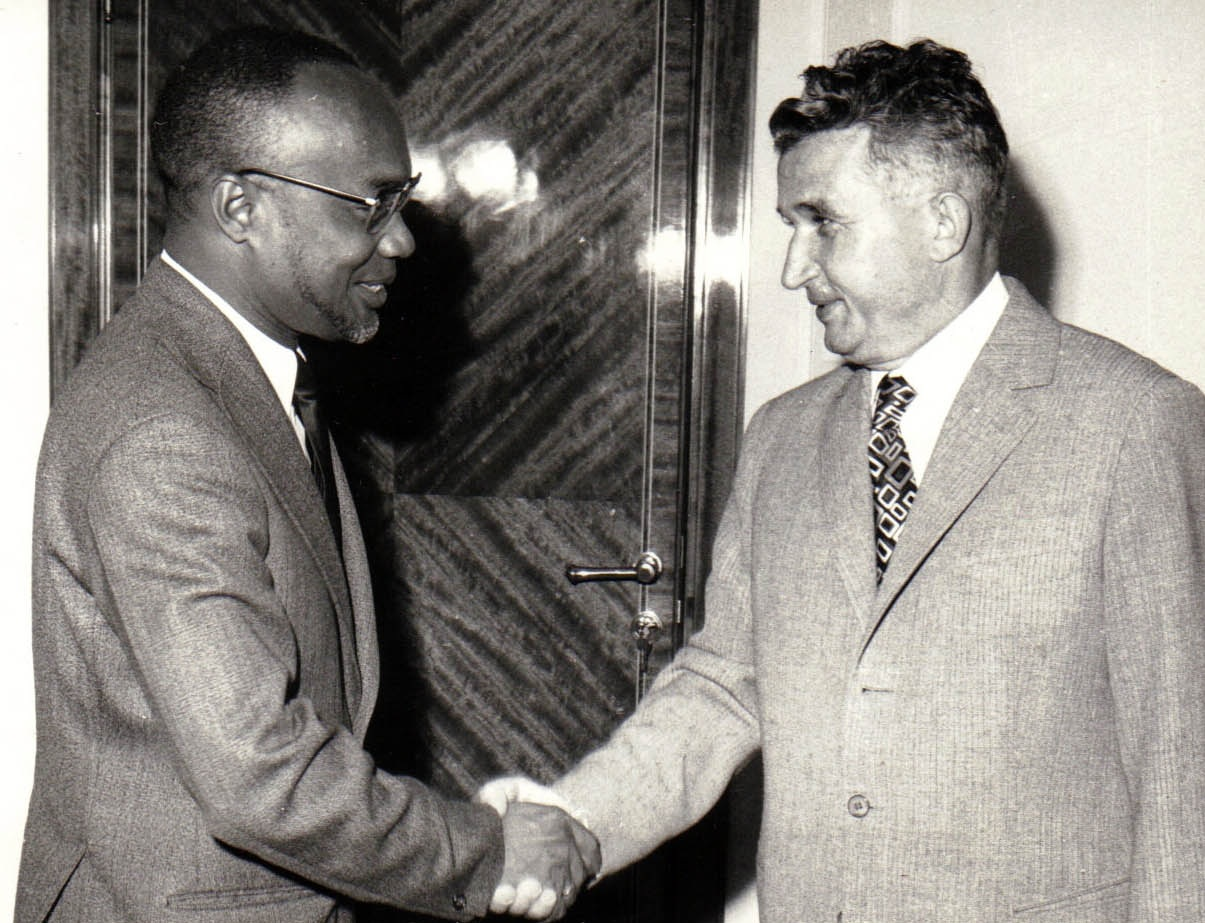
Cabral with Nicolae Ceaușescu, whose government provided some limited support to PAIGC

==== External support ====
Senegalese President Léopold Sédar Senghor was generally pro-Western and he cooperated closely with Portuguese leaders in attempting to broker a political solution to the conflict. (Brazil, itself a former Portuguese colony, also offered to mediate.) At the same time, however, Senegal provided safe haven to PAIGC from 1966, when Senghor's government formally agreed to allow PAIGC soldiers free movement in and out of Senegal, where PAIGC would be allowed to establish bases. Simultaneously, PAIGC retained its headquarters-in-exile in Guinea-Conakry, Guinea's other neighbour and a continued ally of PAIGC.

Elsewhere in Africa, PAIGC received material support from Libya, then under Muammar Gaddafi, and from the new revolutionary government of Algeria. A Marxist organisation operating at the height of the Cold War, it was also supported, from the early 1960s, by socialist states further afield, including the People's Republic of China, the Soviet Union, and Czechoslovakia. Between 1966 and 1974, PAIGC was supported by the government of Fidel Castro in Cuba, which deployed a handful of doctors, military instructors, and technicians to PAIGC camps. Cuban soldiers saw some limited combat while in Guinea, but the Cuban military mission was small – it averaged 50–60 men at any time, primarily artillerymen – and Cabral declined its repeated offers to take a more active role in combat. Other Eastern Bloc countries – Poland, Bulgaria, the German Democratic Republic, and Romania – "engaged minimally" with PAIGC, providing limited non-military support in the form of propaganda support and scholarships for technical training and political education. A similar dynamic adhered in PAIGC's relationships with Yugoslavia and Sweden. Between mid-1969 and mid-1975 PAIGC received 45.2 million Swedish kronor in aid from the Swedish state, representing two-thirds of the Swedish assistance to African liberation movements during this period. Sweden was the most important donor of non-military material for PAIGC during the latter phase of the liberation war.

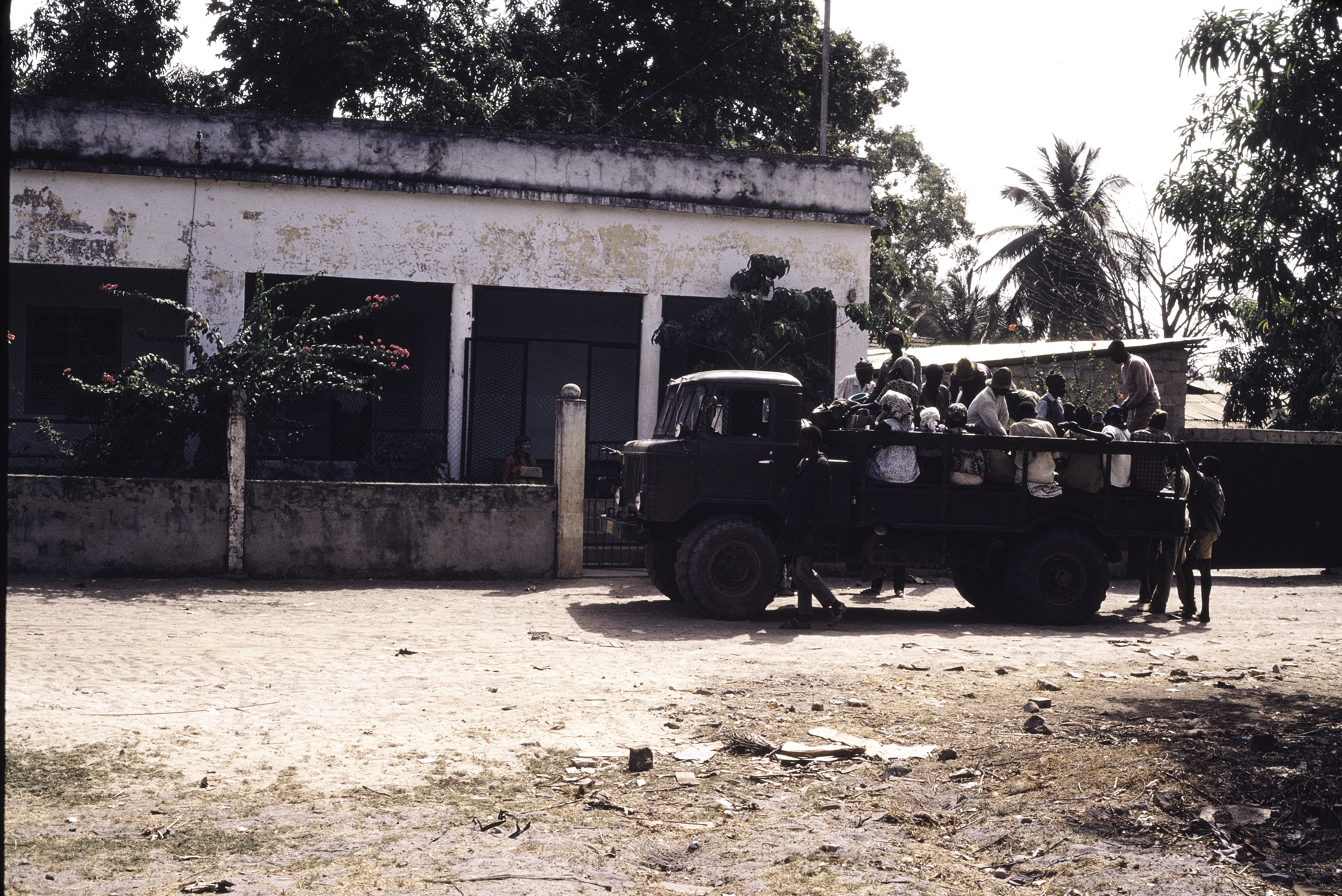
PAIGC office in Ziguinchor, Senegal.

Finally, PAIGC received significant support from the Bissau-Guinean diaspora, which burgeoned as a result of mass displacement during a 1964 PAIGC offensive and during Portuguese bombing campaigns in 1965 and 1967. By 1970, an estimated 106,000 Guineans – almost 20 per cent of the territory's population – had fled the war and relocated to the neighbouring states of Guinea-Conakry and Senegal. These migrant populations, particularly those resident in border regions, provided PAIGC forces with refuge and helped PAIGC soldiers to move regular shipments of weapons from Guinea-Conakry and Senegal into Portuguese Guinea. On a monthly basis, materiel was trucked from Koundara, Guinea-Conakry into Senegalese towns, including Vélingara, where pro-PAIGC forces maintained a warehouse, and then was transported across the border on foot.

=== Portuguese Armed Forces ===
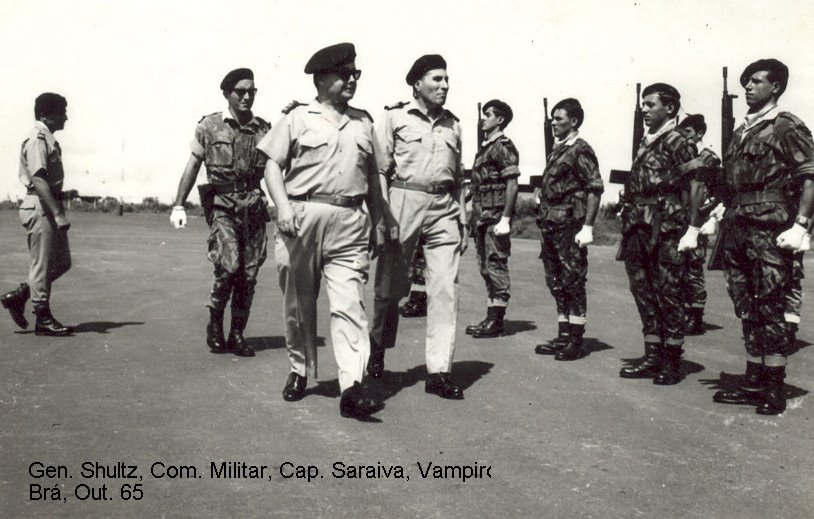
Governor-general Arnaldo Schultz reviewing the Portuguese commando group Vampiros.

PAIGC was countered by the colonial army of the Portuguese Armed Forces stationed in Guinea, which proliferated in the early years of the war. For most of the war, from 1968 until August 1973, General António de Spínola was both governor and military commander in Portuguese Guinea, succeeding General Arnaldo Schultz in both capacities. The strength of his forces in Guinea was estimated at between 31,000 and 32,000 in 1974, and the forces comprised both metropolitan soldiers and locally recruited Guineans.

They will remember you. Portuguese soldier. You, who continue in the colonial army: to take part in crimes against our people: to contribute to ruining your country… ONLY FOR THE PLEASURE OF THE MONEY-GRABBERS OF YOUR COUNTRY

— PAIGC leaflet distributed in Guinea, early 1970s

==== Africanization ====
The "Africanization" of the war effort by Portugal, also pursued in the Angolan and Mozambican theatres, proceeded with particular speed in Guinea, particularly after General Spínola's appointment. It entailed the integration of indigenous Guinean Africans into the Portuguese military forces which fought PAIGC. Until the 1950s, the Portuguese military forces permanently stationed in Guinea included a small force of locally recruited African colonial soldiers (caçadores indigenas), commanded by white officers; non-commissioned officers were a mixture of whites, overseas soldiers (African assimilados), and native or indigenous Africans (indigenato). Spínola planned – and fought with Lisbon – to abolish the distinction between and discrimination among metropolitan soldiers and local recruits, undertaking instead to create a regular and coherent African army whose structure mirrored that of the metropolitan army.

Africanization fostered a large increase in indigenous recruitment into the armed forces. By the early 1970s, an increasing percentage of Guineans were serving as non-commissioned or commissioned officers in Portuguese military forces in Africa. Elite local troops were trained at Portuguese Centres for Commando Instruction, including inside Guinea, where the first such centre was established in 1964, but in many cases in Angola. The Portuguese forces recruited Africans mainly from among the populations of the territories they controlled. In particular, members of the Fulbe ethnic group were over-represented in the Portuguese army, partly because many Fulbe lived in eastern regions which were controlled by Portugal until late in the war and where local chiefs had "generally amicable" relationships with the Portuguese. Portuguese recruitment was also assisted by colonial propaganda, coercion, and the offer of salaries to conscripts.

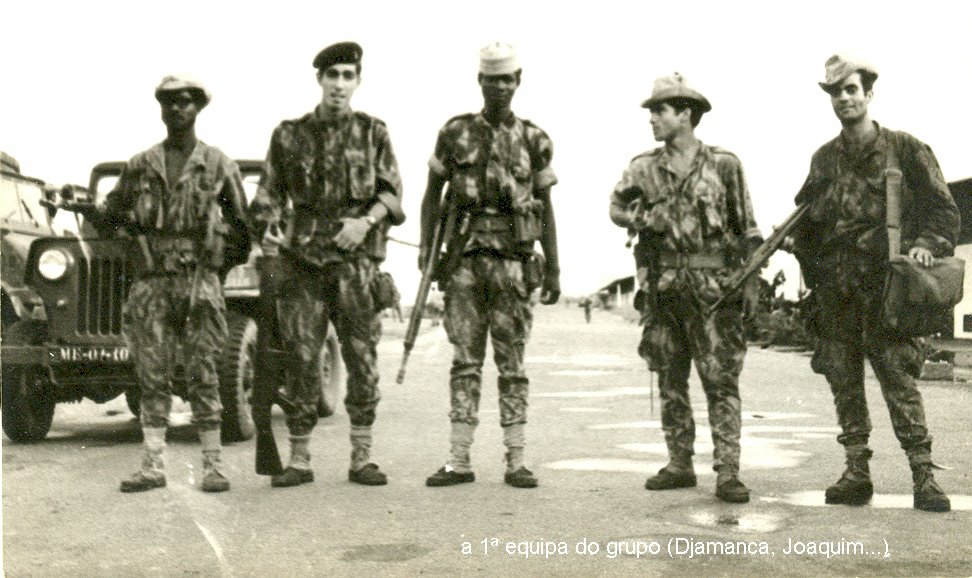
Portuguese commandos and two of the first African commandos in Portuguese service in Brá, Guinea, 1966.

Under Spínola, the Portuguese also created two elite special forces contingents composed of African combatants and engaged in counterinsurgency. The Special Marines (Fuzileiros Especiais Africanos) were created in 1970 and by 1974 numbered 160 men in two detachments; they supplemented other Portuguese elite units conducting amphibious operations in the riverine areas of Guinea which attempted to interdict and destroy guerrilla forces and supplies. The more prominent African Commandos (Comandos Africanos) began operating in 1972 and comprised 700 men in three battalions by 1974. The African Commandos were manned entirely by Africans and carried out special combat operations in neighbouring Senegal and Guinea-Conakry as well as inside Portuguese Guinea. The Commandos were especially well known for carrying out helicoptered commando raids on so-called liberated villages under PAIGC control – Spínola's "version of the US Army's 'search and destroy' operations in Vietnam" – and in liberated areas they were "widely hated for their brutality and ruthlessness".

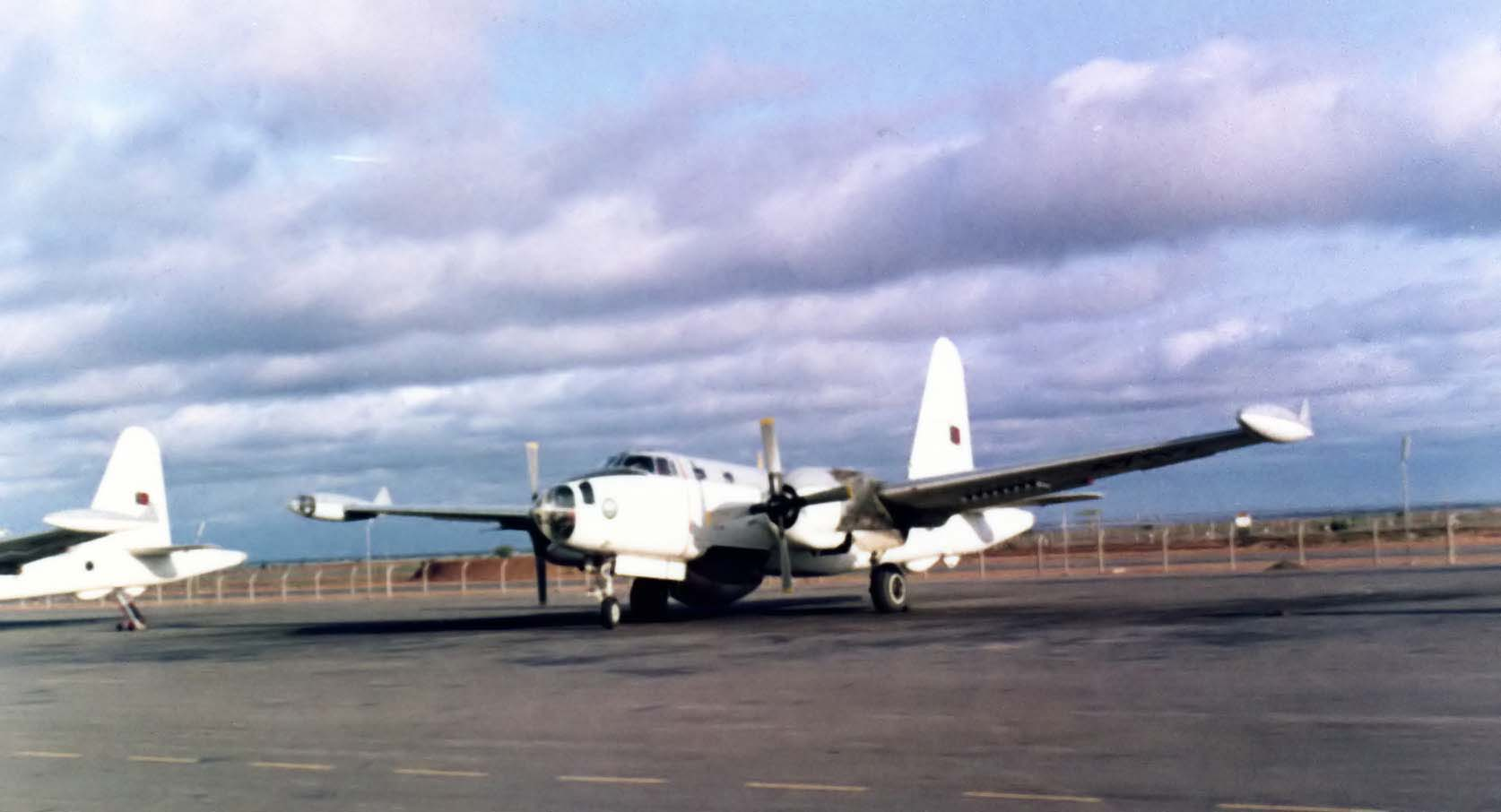
A Lockheed P-2 Neptune of the Portuguese Air Force, 1970s.

In addition, at the outset of the war, Portugal recruited local militias – 18 companies by 1966 – to organise the "self-defence" of local populations, thus freeing the expeditionary army for offensive operations. Once Spínola was appointed, recruiting selectively from among the existing militias, created Special Militias of local combatants organised in combat groups, structured similarly to the Portuguese army (in companies divided into platoons), and operating fairly autonomously. In 1968, he proposed to create five such Special Militias, but Lisbon had authorised only two by 1970, concerned both about financial constraints and about the "informality of procedures" introduced by Africanization.

According to post-war estimates, locally recruited troops in Guinea numbered 1,000 in 1961 (21.1% of all Portuguese troops there), 3,229 (14.9%) in 1967, and 6,425 (20.1%) in 1973. Many thousands more locals were included in Portuguese-aligned militias. In all, there were "at least on paper, upwards of 17,000" African fighters in Guinea; on one estimate, upon the eve of the Portuguese withdrawal in 1974, the total Portuguese force in the territory numbered about 31,000 fighters, of whom 24,800 were black and 6,200 white.

== Conflict (1963–1974) ==
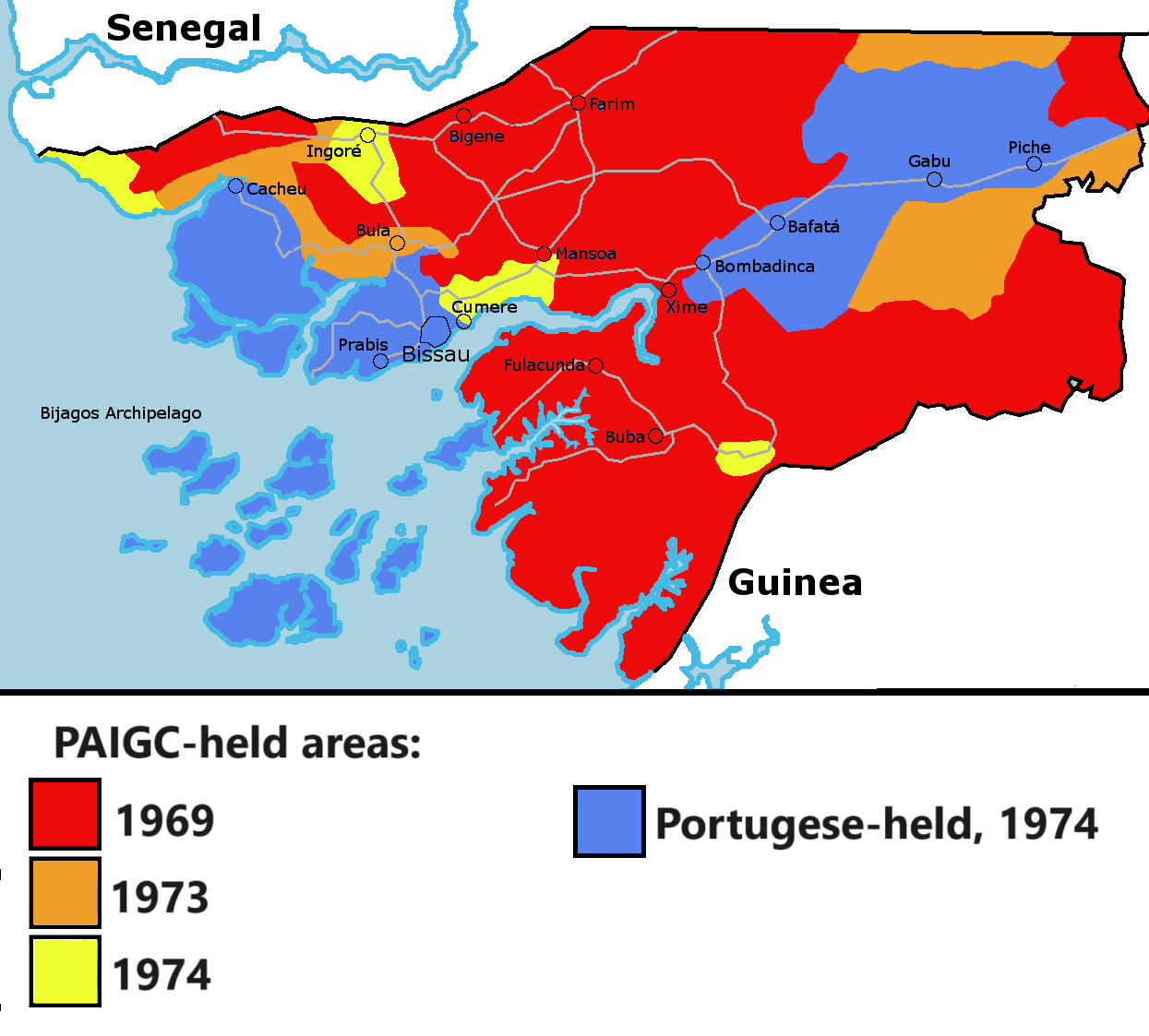
Map showing rebel advances in Guinea-Bissau 1969–1974

=== Initial PAIGC gains: 1963–1967 ===
PAIGC officially launched its armed struggle inside Guinea in early 1963, despite difficult conditions and very limited weapons supplies. PAIGC cadres, stationed south of the Geba River estuary, attacked Portuguese garrisons in Tite and Catió – bases deliberately established in the middle of PAIGC strongholds to serve as bases for surveillance and counter-insurgency. Similar guerrilla attacks were launched throughout the south of Portuguese Guinea, and the conflict spread. Chabal notes that the attacks surprised the Portuguese authorities, who had expected PAIGC to launch cross-border attacks in incursions over the border with Guinea-Conakry, rather than to launch a guerrilla war inside the territory, and who suffered high casualties early on. According to Chabal, PAIGC's strategy was for small groups of guerrillas gradually to gain a foothold in areas where they had popular political support, while seeking "to attack and harass the Portuguese everywhere and at all times, to cut all means of transport and communications and isolate them in the fortified areas where they had to retreat". Its policy, moreover, was never to attempt to take over an area until PAIGC guerrillas had guaranteed the support of the local population there. PAIGC intended always to avoid frontal attack or confrontation with the Portuguese forces, who were better equipped; it envisioned the war ending with PAIGC gradually moving its guerrilla war from the countryside towards the cities, which it would encircle rather than seize.

By July 1963, PAIGC had consolidated its military position in the southern littoral, and had also gained "a tenuous foothold" in the Mansôa–Mansaba–Oio triangle, north of the Geba estuary. Thus, at a five-day conference the same month, PAIGC commanders agreed to redouble their efforts on the northern front.

The geography, dense forests with numerous waterways, were favourable to guerrilla activity. The PAIGC had few weapons – perhaps only one submachine gun and two pistols per group – so attacked Portuguese convoys to gain more weapons. Each group fought in isolation and established a forest based hideout independently from the others. Many groups were formed on tribal and religious grounds. These groups began to abuse the locals and people began to flee the “liberated” zones. The central PAIGC command were horrified and considered this military “commandism”. Around October 1963 the Portuguese began to retaliate against PAIGC activity with bomber raids; by the end of 1963 some villages had been abandoned as the occupants took to the forest.

In 1964 PAIGC opened their second front in the north. In April 1964 the Portuguese launched a counter-offensive. They attacked the PAIGC held island of Como in the south of the country. 3,000 Portuguese, with air support, were involved but after 65 days were forced to withdraw. The PAIGC harassed the Portuguese during the rainy season. At some point in 1964 Portuguese Air Force planners failed to verify their target and bombed Portuguese troops. In retaliation Portuguese soldiers and sailors attacked the squadron barracks in the colony's capital Bissau.

In 1965 the war spread to the eastern part of the country; that same year the PAIGC expanded its attacks in the northern area of the country, where at the time only the Front for the Liberation and Independence of Guinea (FLING), a minor insurgent force, was operating. By this time, the PAIGC, led by Amílcar Cabral, began openly receiving military support from the Soviet Union, China, and Cuba.

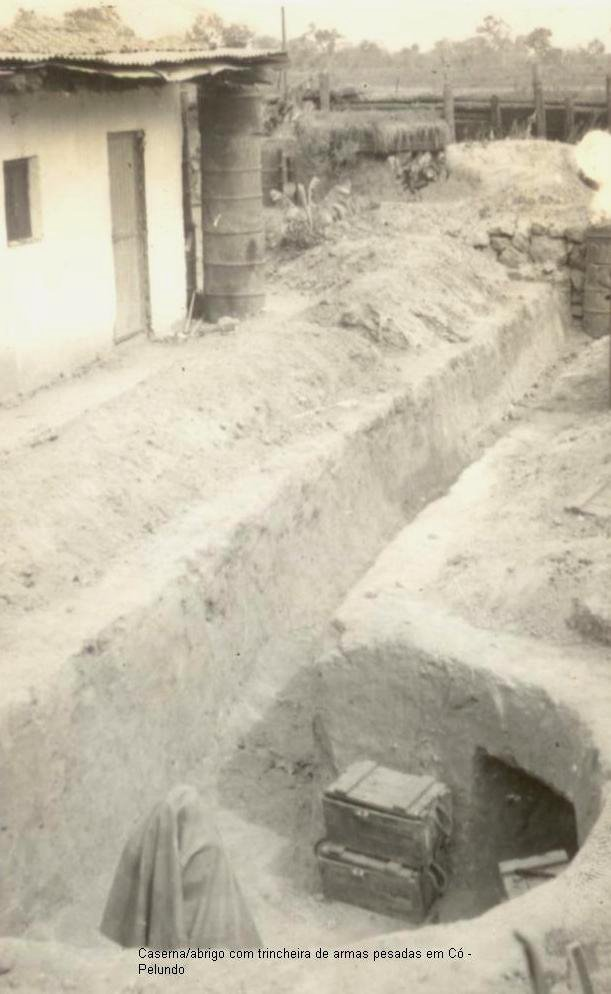
Portuguese shelter-barracks at Có, Pelundo.

The success of PAIGC guerilla operations forced the Exército Português do Ultramar (Portuguese overseas armed forces) deployed in Portuguese Guinea on the defensive at an early stage; the latter were forced to limit their response to defending territories and cities already held. Unlike Portugal's other African territories, successful small-unit Portuguese counterinsurgency tactics were slow to evolve in Guinea. Defensive operations, where soldiers were dispersed in small numbers to guard critical buildings, farms, or infrastructure were particularly devastating to the regular Portuguese infantry, who became vulnerable to guerrilla attacks outside of populated areas by the forces of the PAIGC.

They were also demoralized by the steady growth of PAIGC liberation sympathizers and recruits among the rural population. In a relatively short time, the PAIGC had succeeded in reducing Portuguese military and administrative control of the country to a relatively small area of Guinea. The scale of this success can be seen in the fact that native Guineans in the 'liberated territories' ceased payment of debts to Portuguese landowners as well as payment of taxes to the colonial administration.

The branch stores of the Companhia União Fabril (CUF), Mario Lima Whanon, and Manuel Pinto Brandão companies were seized and inventoried by the PAIGC in the areas they controlled, while the use of Portuguese currency in the areas under guerilla control was banned. In order to maintain the economy in the liberated territories, the PAIGC was compelled at an early stage to establish its own Marxist administrative and governmental bureaucracy, which organized agricultural production, educated farm workers on protecting crops from destruction from government attacks, and opened collective armazéns do povo (people's stores) to supply urgently needed tools and supplies in exchange for agricultural produce. By 1967 the PAIGC had carried out 147 attacks on Portuguese barracks and army encampments, and effectively controlled 2/3 of Portuguese Guinea.

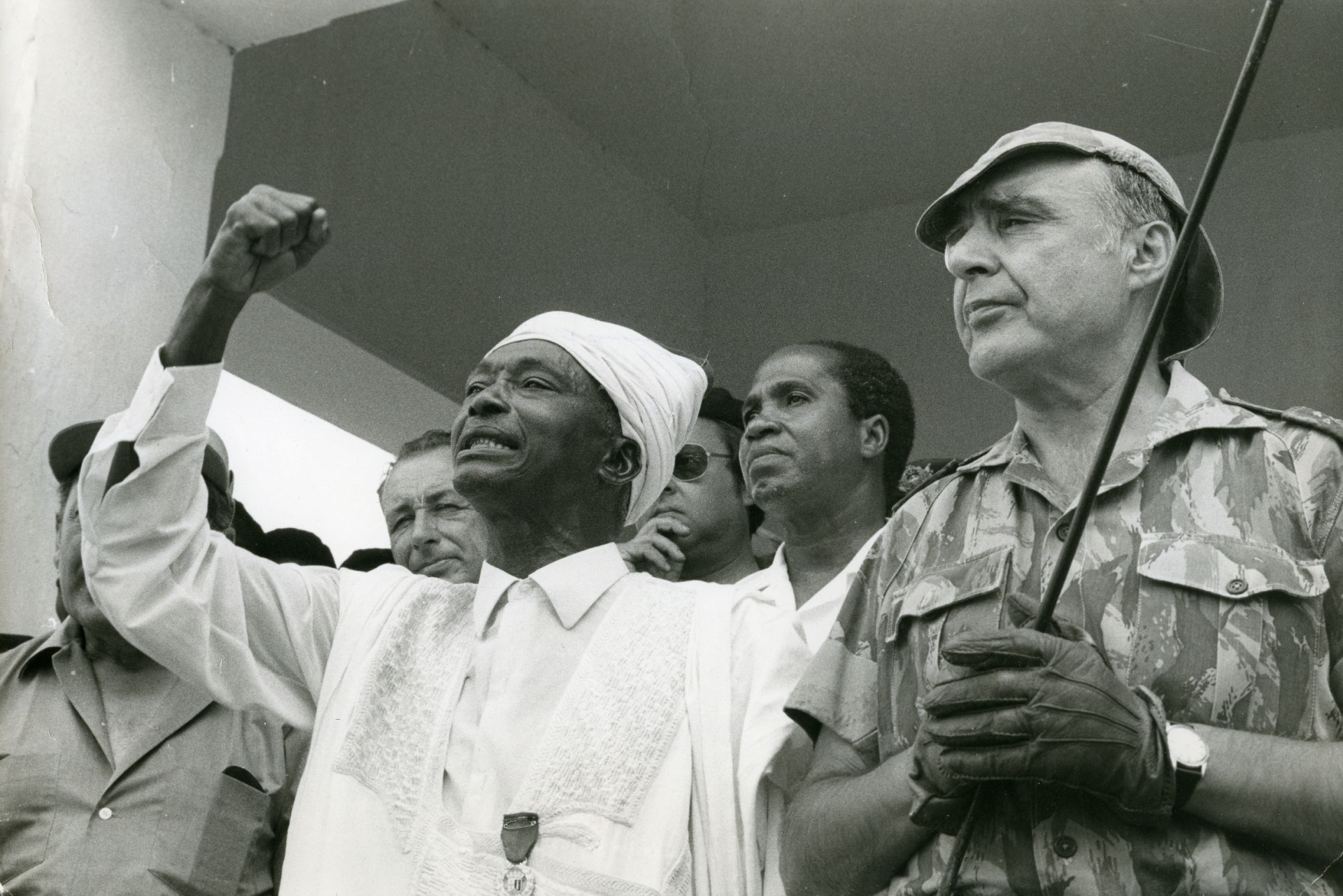
Gen. António de Spínola to the right of a traditional Guinean leader during a speech.

The next year, Portugal began a new campaign against the guerrillas with the arrival of the new governor of the colony, General António de Spínola. General Spínola instituted a series of civil and military reforms, intended to first contain, then roll back the PAIGC and its control of much of the rural portion of Portuguese Guinea. This included a 'hearts and minds' propaganda campaign designed to win the trust of the indigenous population, an effort to eliminate some of the discriminatory practices against native Guineans, a massive construction campaign for public works including new schools, hospitals, improved telecommunications and road networks, and a large increase in recruitment of native Guineans into the Portuguese armed forces serving in Guinea as part of an Africanisation strategy. The Portuguese conducted many search and destroy operations against the PAIGC 20 km from the frontier. On one occasion five helicopters landed 50 white plus some African soldiers. Thirty-six FARP soldiers under Bobo, commander of the Sambuya zone, drew the Portuguese forces into a wooded area. Bobo launched an ambush at 1700 hours, inflicted casualties, and forced the Portuguese to withdraw. The PAIGC claimed the Portuguese suffered five dead and several wounded against their own four wounded.

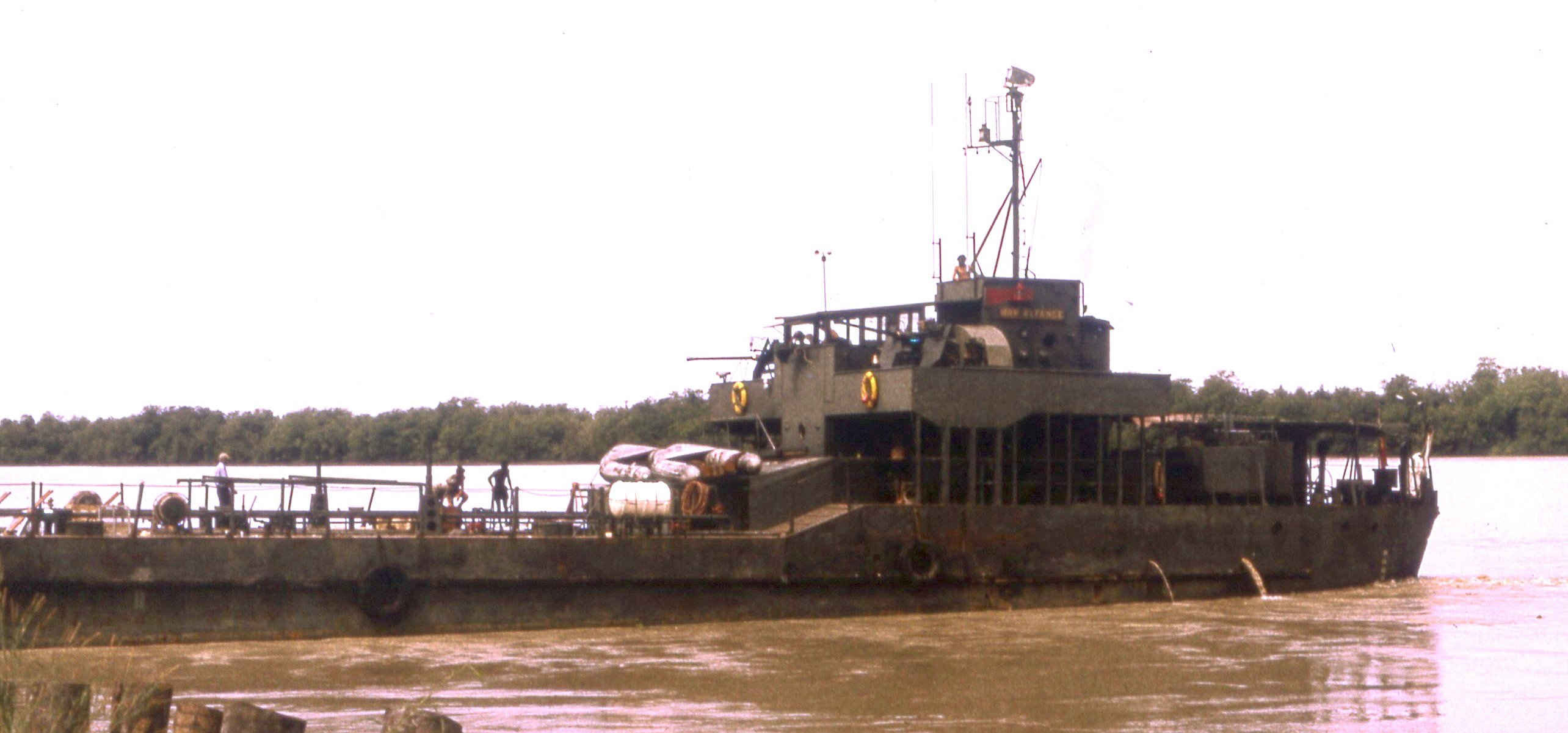
Portuguese river landing craft in Guinea, in 1973.

In 1966 the Portuguese attempted four large unsuccessful search-and-destroy sweeps of Iracunda. Each included several hundred conscripts with automatic weapons, mortars, bazookas, and air support. Warned by the peasants or by their own reconnaissance patrols, the PAIGC pulled back, loosely encircled the Portuguese, and launched night attacks to break up the column. The insurgents would sometimes feint at the end of the line to distract attention from the main attack elsewhere. The PAIGC considered the conscripts inept in the jungle.

In Mar 1968 the PAIGC conducted an attack against the main Portuguese airfield just outside Bissau. The airfield was protected by wire, minefields and blockhouses. Thirteen volunteers infiltrated to the edge of the field and fired into the base, damaging planes on the ground, hangars, and other installations. They then withdrew with no casualties.

The Portuguese stationed an infantry company at Madina do Boé in the east near the border with Guinea. With few inhabitants and structures to protect, and a long permeable frontier to guard, the company ended up just protecting themselves. Despite the fact there was no real benefit to keeping them there, the authorities refused to withdraw the unit until 1969. As feared, the PAIGC used the withdrawal as a PR opportunity with foreign journalists.

In mid-1969 the PAIGC launched Operation Tenaz against Portuguese positions around Bafata, north of the River Corubal. They started by secretly depositing ammunition in dumps to the rear of areas of engagement. Reconnaissance was provided by two bi-groups that infiltrated the area to discover the Portuguese dispositions. Then two strike forces of several hundred men entered the area.

=== Tactical changes ===
Military tactical reforms by Portuguese commanders included new naval amphibious operations to overcome some of the mobility problems inherent in the underdeveloped and marshy areas of the country. These new operations utilized Destacamentos de Fuzileiros Especiais (DFE) (special marine assault detachments) as strike forces. The Fuzileiros Especiais were lightly equipped with folding-stock m/961 (G3) rifles, 37mm rocket launchers, and light machine guns such as the Heckler & Koch HK21 to enhance their mobility in the difficult, swampy terrain.

Between 1968 and 1972, the Portuguese forces increased their offensive posture, in the form of raids into PAIGC-controlled territory. At this time Portuguese forces also adopted unorthodox means of countering the insurgents, including attacks on the political structure of the nationalist movement. Nonetheless, the PAIGC continued to increase its strength, and began to heavily press Portuguese defense forces.

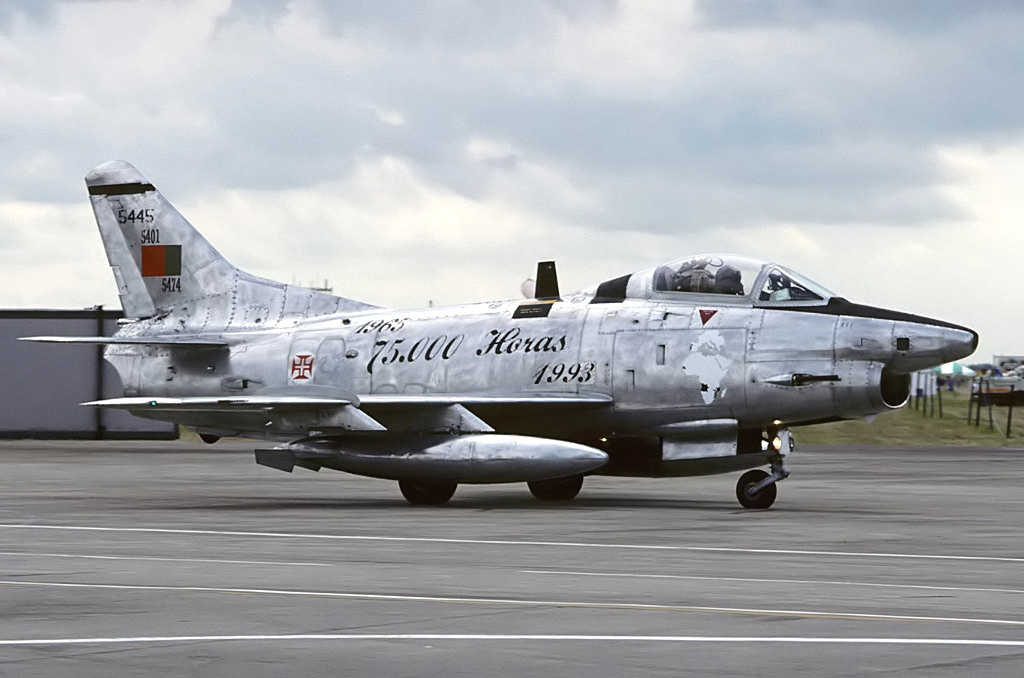
Portuguese Fiat G.91 fighter-bomber, deployed by the Portuguese Air Force in the theatres of Guinea and Mozambique.

In 1970 the Portuguese Air Force (FAP) began to use weapons similar to those the US was using in the Vietnam War: napalm and defoliants in order to find the insurgents or at least deny them the cover and concealment needed for rebel ambushes.

In general, the PAIGC in Guinea was the best armed, trained, and led of all the guerrilla movements. After 1968 PAIGC forces were increasingly supplied with modern Soviet weapons and equipment, most notably SA-7 rocket launchers and radar-controlled AA cannons. These weapons effectively undermined Portuguese air superiority, preventing the destruction by air of PAIGC encampments in territory it controlled. By 1970 the PAIGC even had candidates training in the Soviet Union, learning to fly MIGs and to operate Soviet-supplied amphibious assault crafts and APCs.

Considerable support to the PAIGC from Yugoslavia began in after 1968, in the form of military equipment, tactical, technical, and political training for PAIGC leadership, and medical aid. Yugoslavia also built a well-equipped hospital in Boké for PAIGC fighters, which was staffed by both Yugoslav and Cuban doctors, which was the flagship of the PAIGC health services.

=== Invasion of Guinea: November 1970 ===
In late November 1970, Portugal launched Operation Green Sea, an amphibious attack on Guinea-Conakry designed to capture the PAIGC leadership, including Cabral, and to topple Guinean President Ahmed Sékou Touré, ideally to be replaced by a leader more willing to cooperate with the Portuguese and to obstruct PAIGC's supply lines. Chabal views the operation as "ill-timed and ill-prepared" and as "desperate": the Portuguese operatives were dispersed and expelled from Conakry, and, having revivified Third World political support for PAIGC, the misadventure strained Portuguese relations with other Western countries. The United Nations (UN) Security Council unanimously condemned the operation in Resolution 290, and the following year passed Resolution 291 condemning other cross-border incursions by Portugal into Guinea.

Over the next two years, Portugal failed to make military advances or to forestall the consolidation of PAIGC's advances. By the beginning of 1972, although territorial boundaries remained blurry, most of the country belonged to one of PAIGC's liberated zones; by the end of the year, a de facto balance of power or even "situation of routine" had developed between Portuguese and PAIGC forces. Meanwhile, however, PAIGC had launched a flurry of political activity – having judged in roughly 1971 that independence was feasible and even imminent, its leadership had begun preparing for independence, including by creating new domestic political structures (with elections held in 1972) and by conducting an intense diplomatic offensive abroad.

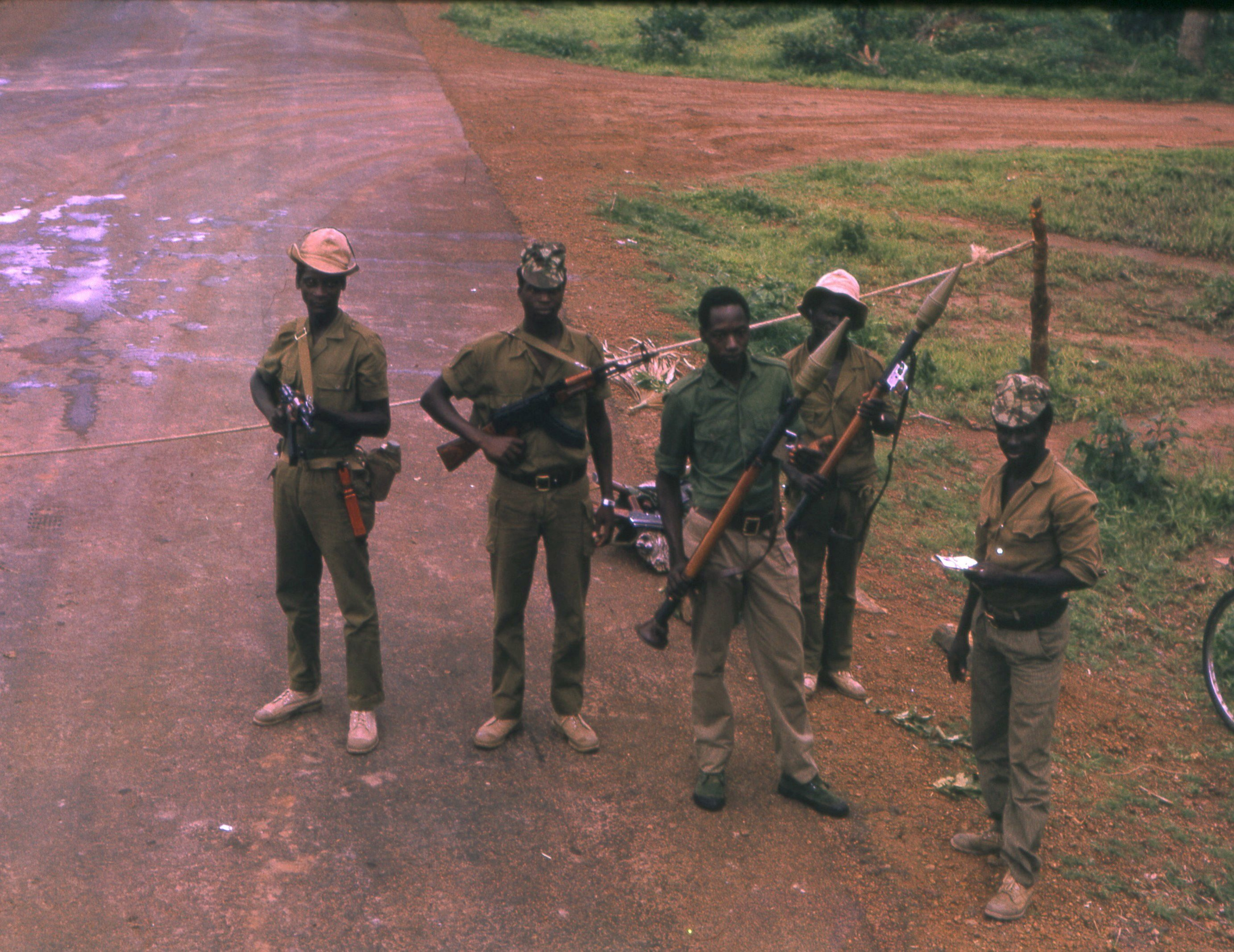
PAIGC soldiers at a military checkpoint, 1974.

=== Assassination of Amílcar Cabral: January 1973 ===
After years of attempts by Portugal to attack or capture Cabral as a means of undermining PAIGC's organizational structure, Cabral was assassinated on 20 January 1973 in Conakry, by disgruntled PAIGC members. PAIGC purged the traitors, and regrouped under the joint leadership of Aristides Pereira and Luís Cabral, Amílcar's half-brother.

Rather than disabling the group, the assassination of PAIGC's leader was followed by some of its most ambitious offensives, as it destroyed or took over key Portuguese positions in the north and on the southern border. Having acquired new weaponry, and in particular new ground-to-air missiles, PAIGC began in March 1973 to attack with vigour the Portuguese Air Force, "effectively neutralising" Portugal's air superiority – which until then had been Portugal's most marked tactical advantage, and a significant one given Guinea's difficult ground terrain. As PAIGC deployed its new ground-to-air missiles, as well as new large-caliber mortars and rockets (reportedly from Soviet-bloc suppliers), the war "increasingly took on a 'conventional' rather than guerrilla character". In July 1973, PAIGC artillery destroyed the important Portuguese strongpoint of Guileje, which previously had been held by an elite garrison of 400 mostly European troops and which had presented a major obstacle to PAIGC's communications with the government in Guinea-Conakry. By then, Portuguese forces were largely confined to the major cities and a diminished collection of fortified camps, and the Portuguese strategy increasingly amounted to little more than – in the phrase of Portuguese officer Major Carlos Fabião – "holding on as best as possible" ("aguentar enquanto fosse possível"). It launched no further offensives in the war.

== End of Portuguese rule in Guinea ==
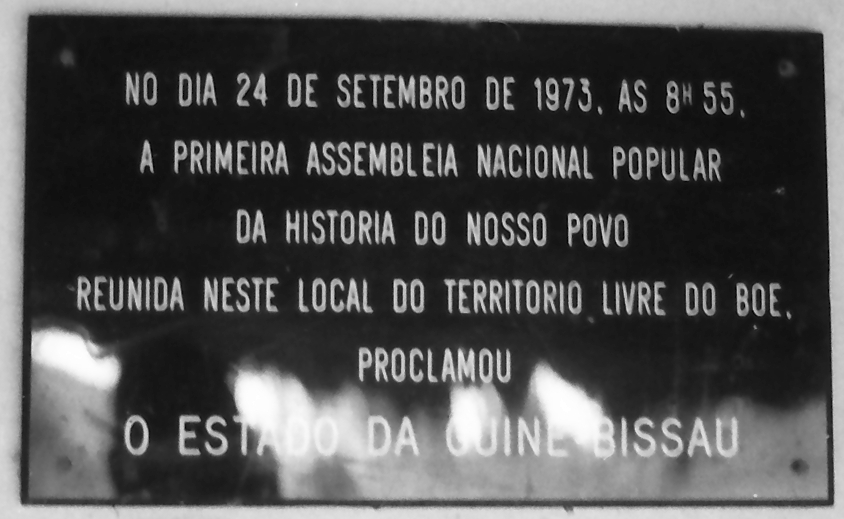
A plaque commemorating the unilateral declaration of independence on 24 September 1973 in Boé.

=== Unilateral independence: September 1973 ===
On 23–24 September 1973, the People's National Assembly (Assembleia Nacional Popular de Guiné) met in Madina do Boé, near the border with Guinea-Conakry, and declared the independence of the Republic of Guinea-Bissau. The Assembly comprised 120 delegates, overwhelmingly from PAIGC, who had been appointed following elections held by PAIGC in 1972 in the so-called liberated zones – areas which PAIGC controlled with little Portuguese interference. During the Boé congress, the Assembly also nominated Luís Cabral as president at the head of a fifteen-member council of state.

Spínola and other Portuguese commanders told the press that the liberated zones were a myth, that the entire territory remained under the control of Portuguese forces, and that the declaration of independence had been issued outside Guinea. Nonetheless, before the end of the year, the new Republic of Guinea-Bissau had been recognised by at least 57 states. On 2 November, the UN General Assembly passed, by 93 votes to seven, a resolution which welcomed "the recent accession to independence of the people of Guinea-Bissau", recognised the state's sovereignty, condemned Portugal's continued presence in parts of the territory, and called on the UN Security Council to take "all effective steps to restore the territorial integrity of the Republic".

=== Algiers accord: August 1974 ===
Evidence published by the Portuguese newspaper Expresso in 1994 suggests that the Portuguese regime held secret diplomatic talks with PAIGC in London on 26–27 March 1974. However, diplomatic progress accelerated the following month, when the regime was overthrown in a military coup during the Carnation Revolution of 25 April 1974. The war in Guinea-Bissau has been viewed as a factor which contributed to the coup and revolution: its status as "the most intense, destructive, and materially pointless" of the three Portuguese wars in Africa rendered it an embarrassment to the outgoing regime; and the coup was organised by the left-wing Armed Forces Movement (Movimento das Forças Armadas), the core of which "took shape" first among military officers in Guinea-Bissau. Spínola, who had been at the head of the Portuguese effort in Guinea-Bissau, himself became president of the new National Salvation Junta.

In May, the new Portuguese government agreed to negotiate with PAIGC. With the assistance of the British Foreign Office, meetings between PAIGC and the new Portuguese regime were held on 25–31 May 1974 at the Hyde Park Hotel in London. The talks reached deadlock over sequencing, as PAIGC insisted that Portugal should recognise the 1973 declaration of independence as a precondition for the ceasefire sought by Portugal. However, the parties reconvened later in Algiers, Algeria, which PAIGC regarded as a more "comfortable" environment than London. Meanwhile, Portuguese troops in the field in Guinea-Bissau established informal contacts with PAIGC troops; and, on 29 July, the territorial assembly of the Portuguese Armed Forces Movement issued a declaration which applauded the anti-colonial "struggle for national liberation" and described PAIGC as "the sole legitimate representative of the people of Guinea-Bissau". On 26 August 1974, in Algiers, Portugal and the PAIGC signed an accord in which Portugal agreed to recognise Guinea-Bissau's independence and to remove all troops by the end of October. Also in August, the UN Security Council recommended Guinea-Bissau's admission into the UN.

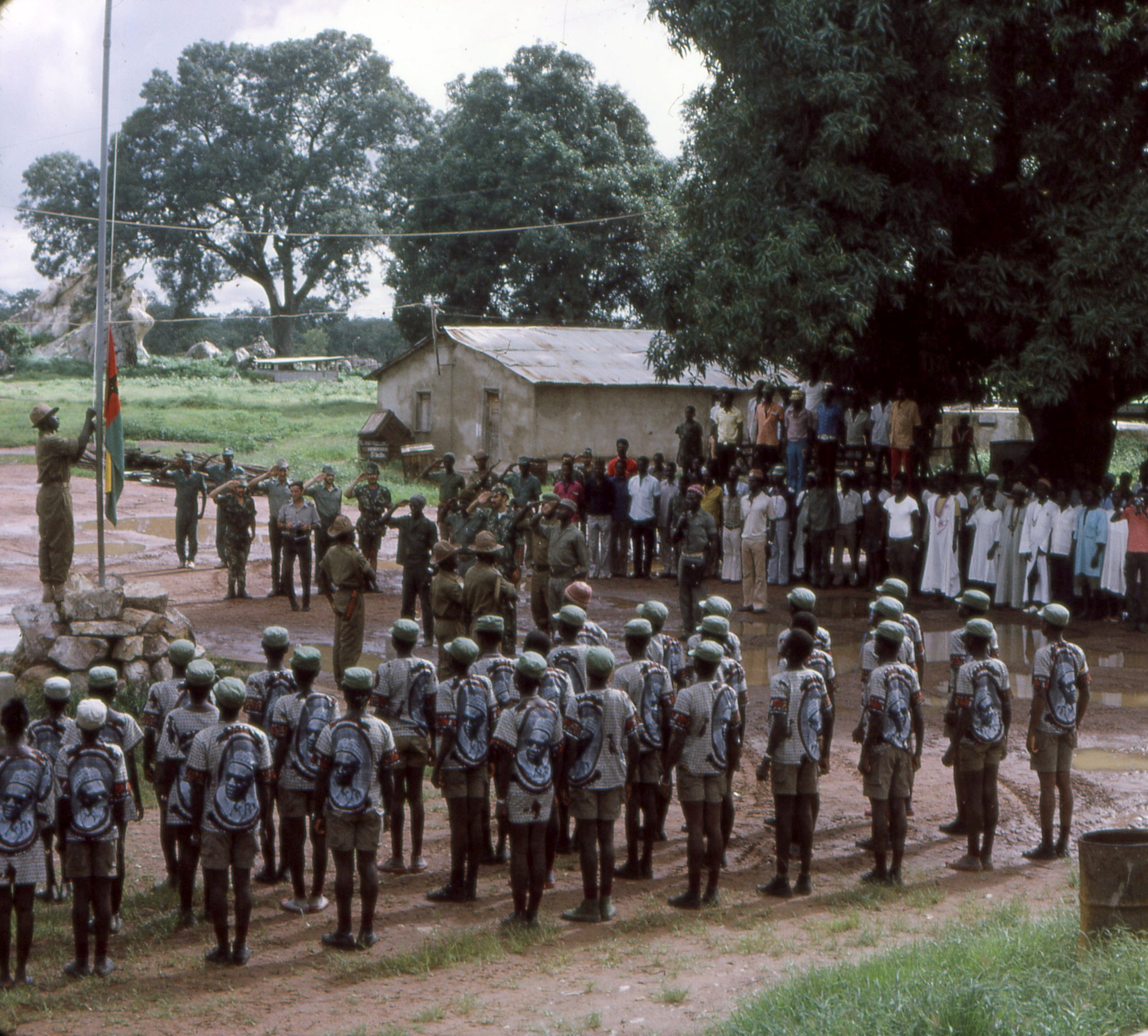
PAIGC guerrillas raise the new flag of Guinea-Bissau in 1974.

=== Portuguese withdrawal: September 1974 ===
According to Basil Davidson, a de facto ceasefire had already obtained in Guinea-Bissau since the Carnation Revolution, disturbed only once by a mild exchange of gunfire on 27 May, which had been precipitated by "a mutual confusion". Indeed, a semi-formal withdrawal of Portuguese troops began before the Algiers accord was signed, with 41 camps evacuated by 24 August. The core 600 African Special Commandos were demobilised on 20 August.

As stipulated in the Algiers accord, Portugal granted full independence to Guinea-Bissau on September 10, 1974, after over eleven years of armed conflict. Historian Norrie McQueen notes that the accord and its implementation preserved an ambiguity with respect to the legal status of the withdrawal – that is, as to whether it constituted a negotiated transfer of power, or a belated recognition of the 1973 declaration of independence. Nonetheless, by the time the Portuguese withdrawal was completed later in September, the independence of Guinea-Bissau "had been established beyond any political or legal debate". The neighbouring Cape Verde archipelago, which also formerly belonged to Portuguese Guinea, attained independence in 1975 as the Republic of Cabo Verde.

== Aftermath ==
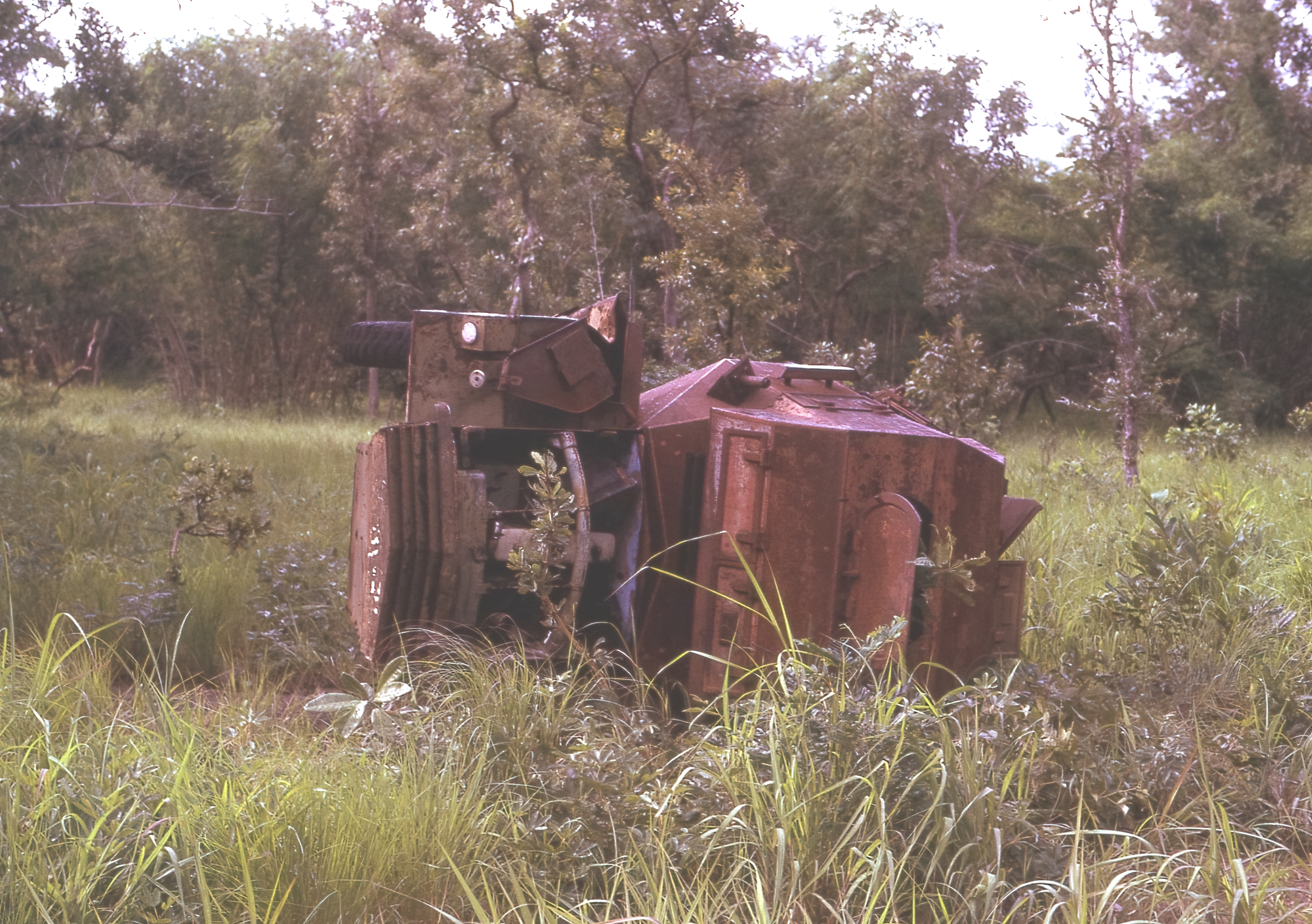
A destroyed Portuguese armoured car in Guinea-Bissau

With the coming of independence, the PAIGC moved swiftly to extend its control throughout the country. A Marxist one-party state controlled by the PAIGC and headed by Luís Cabral was established. Indigenous troops who had served with the Portuguese Army were given the choice of either returning home with their families while receiving full pay until the end of December 1974, or of joining the PAIGC military. A total of 7,447 black African soldiers who had served in Portuguese native commando units, security forces, and the armed militia decided not to join the new ruling party and were summarily executed by the PAIGC after Portuguese forces ceased hostilities.

== Gallery ==
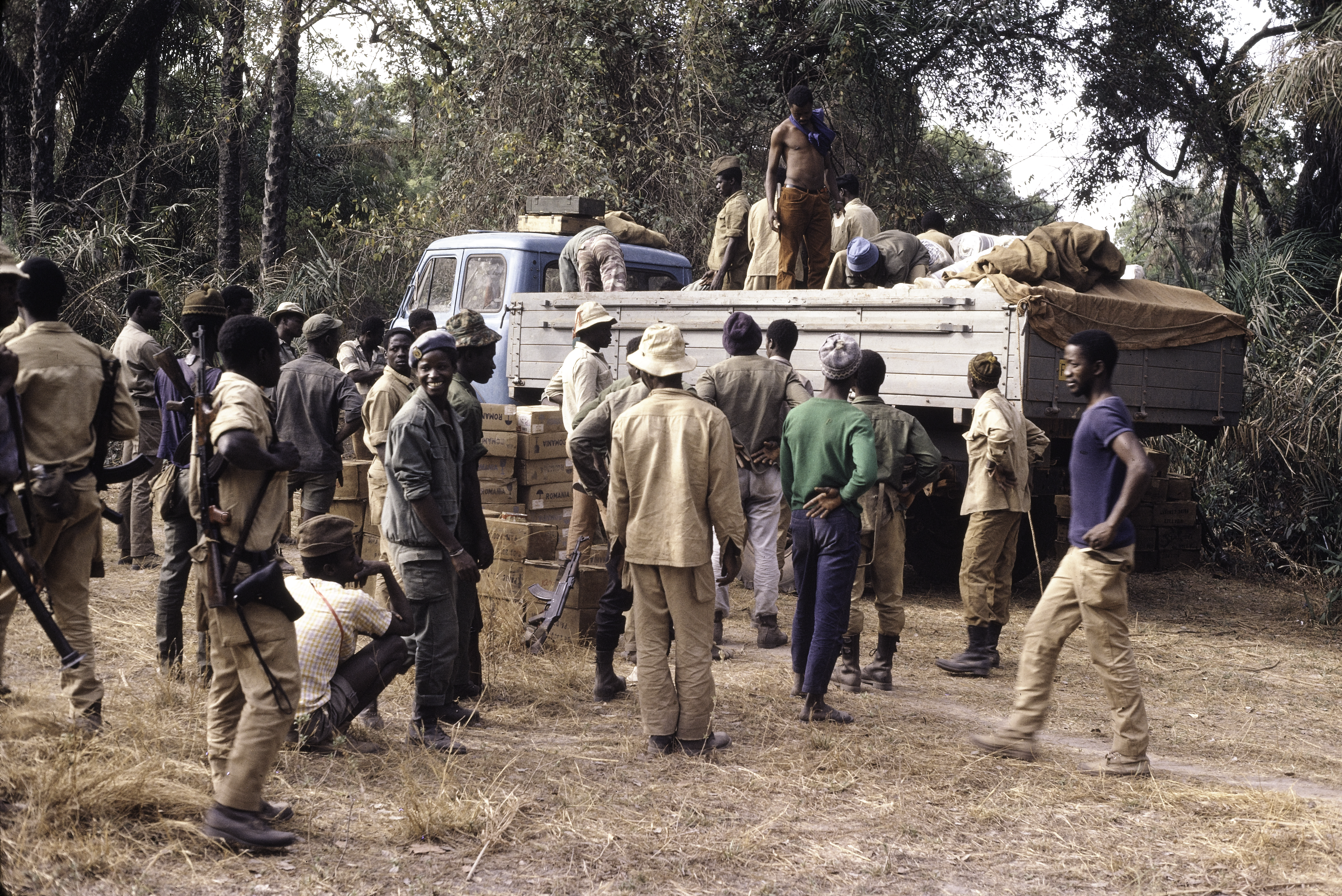
PAIGC soldiers loading weapons, 1973.

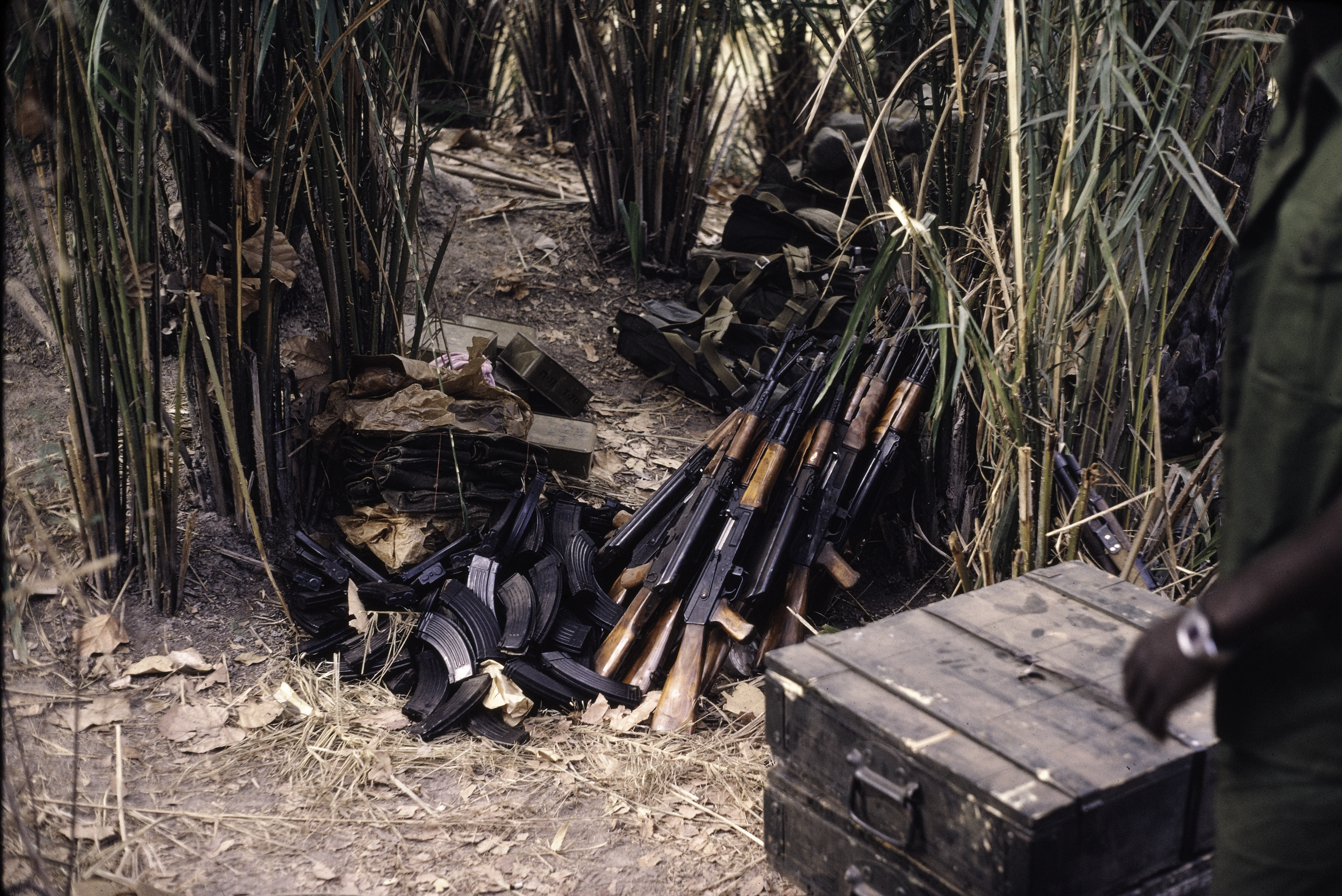
Kalashnikovs for Hermangono, 1973.

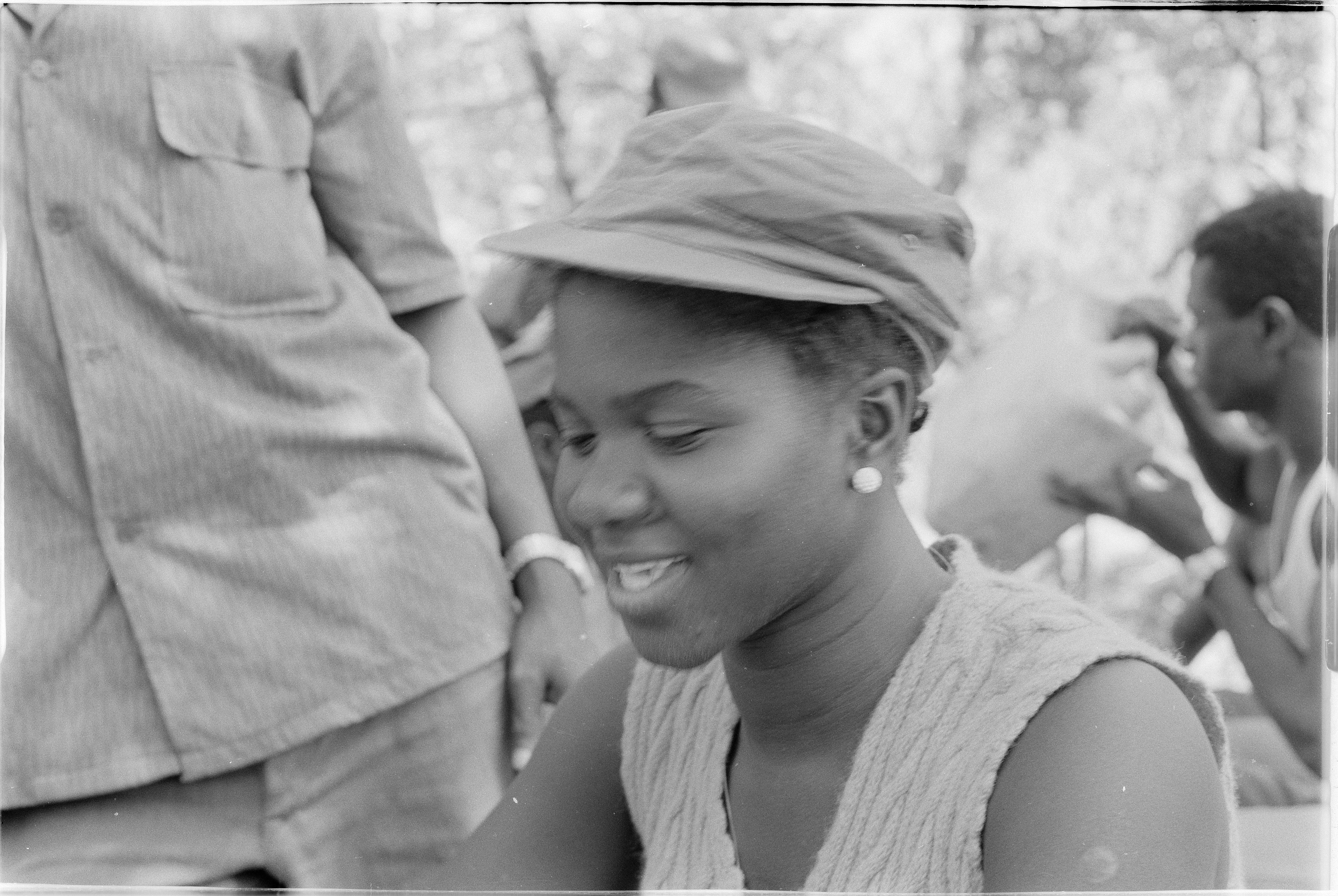
Female soldier playing cards, 1973.

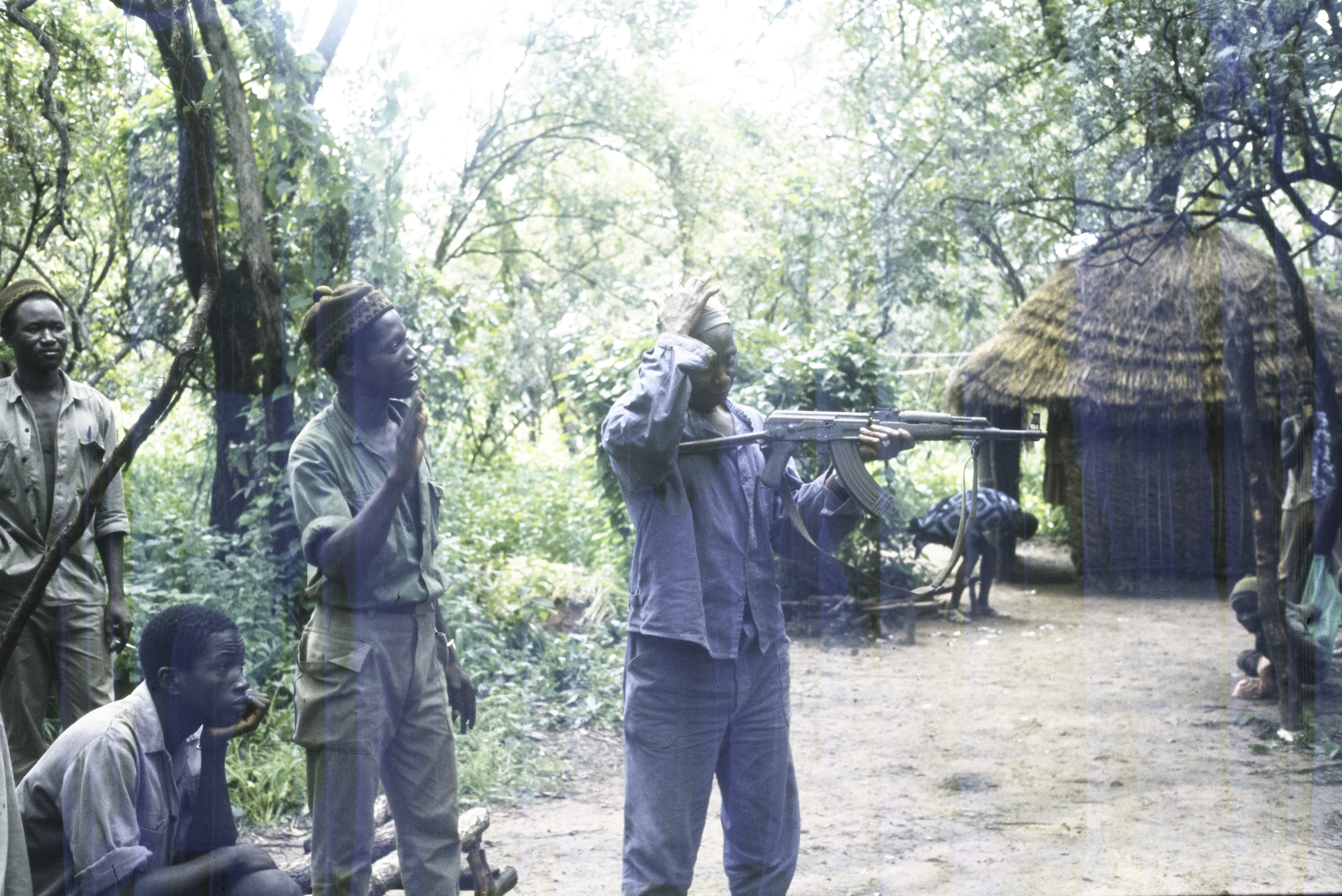
PAIGC recruits learning how to shoot in Ziguinchor, Senegal, 1973.

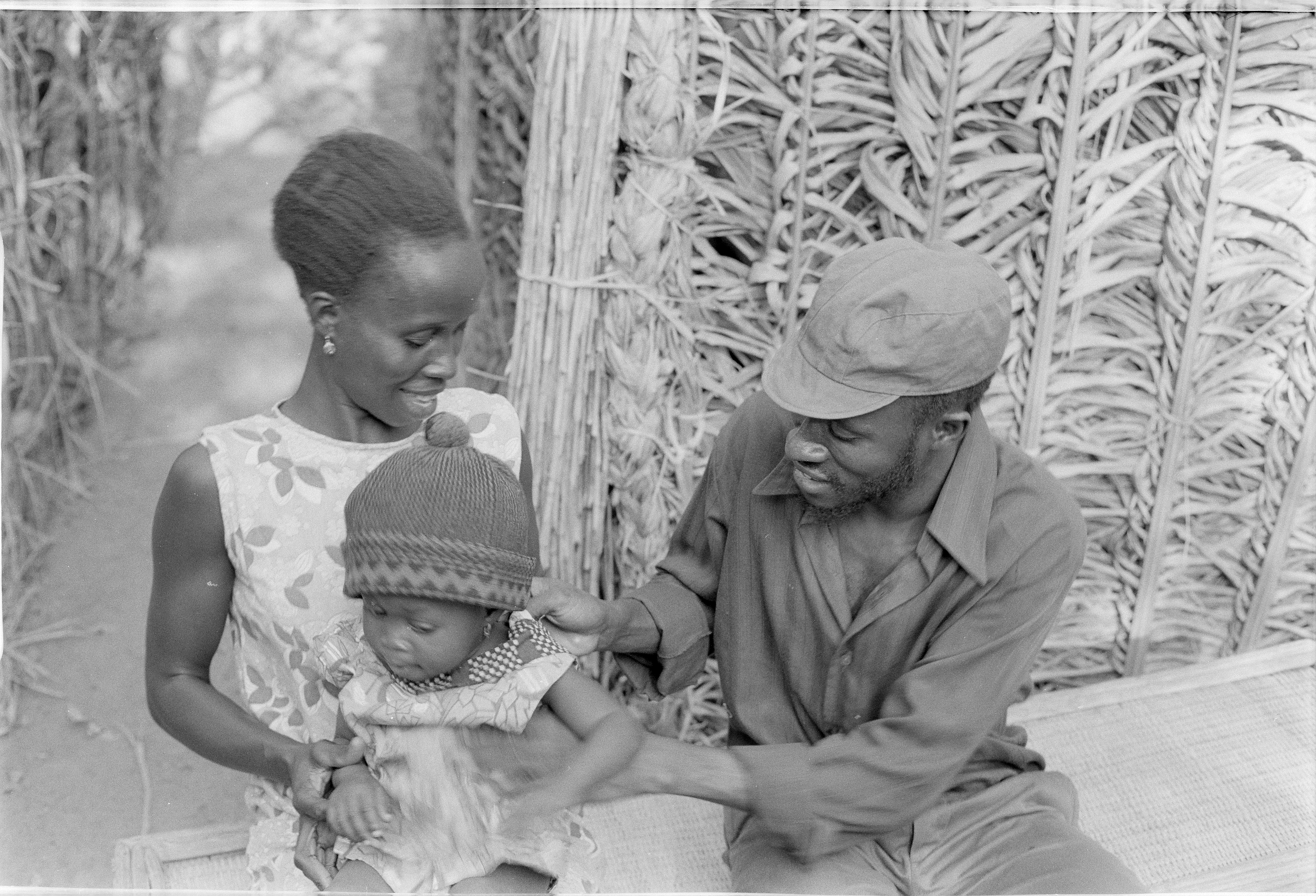
PAIGC soldier with his family in a military camp, 1974.

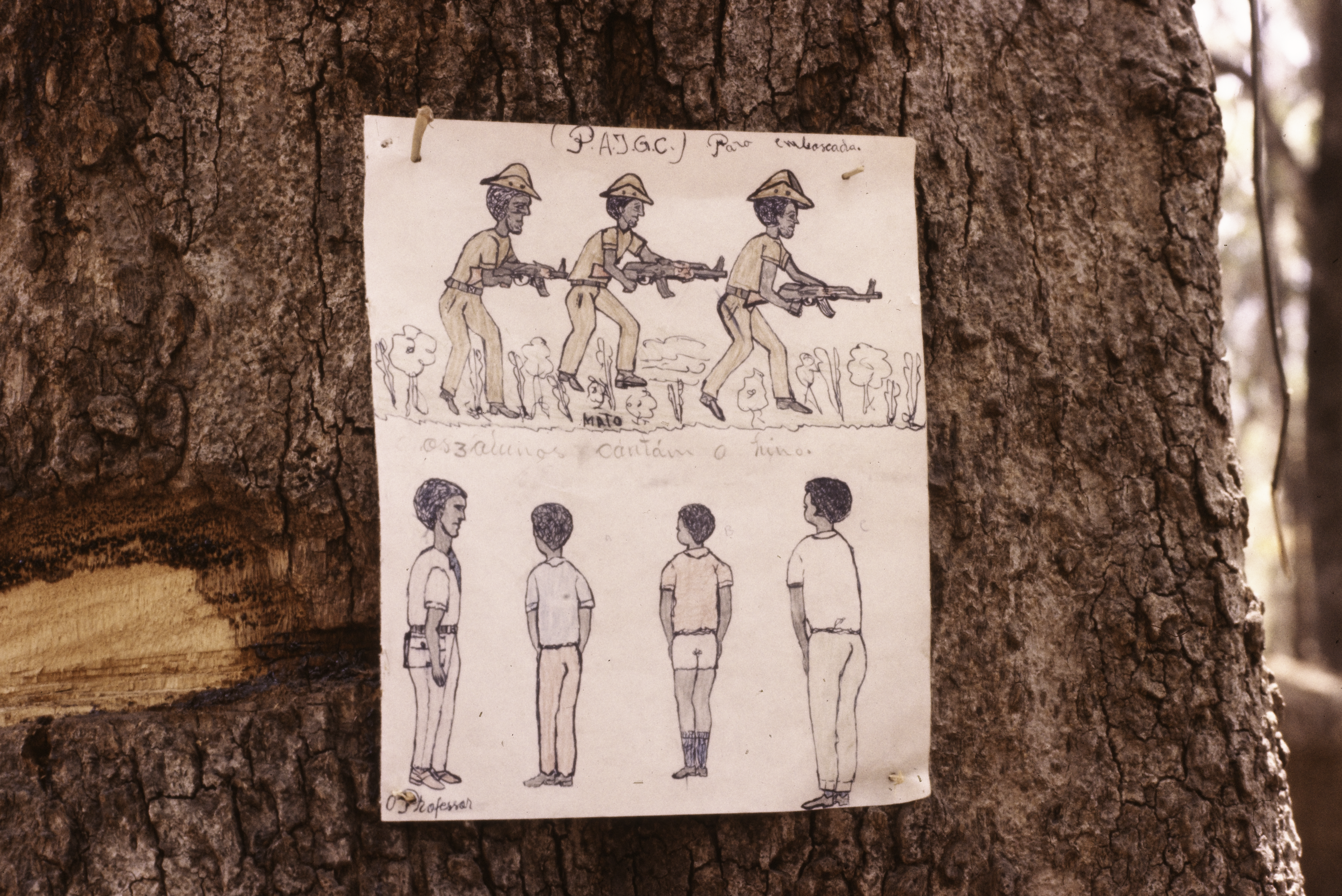
Drawings showing PAIGC soldiers in Farim, 1974.

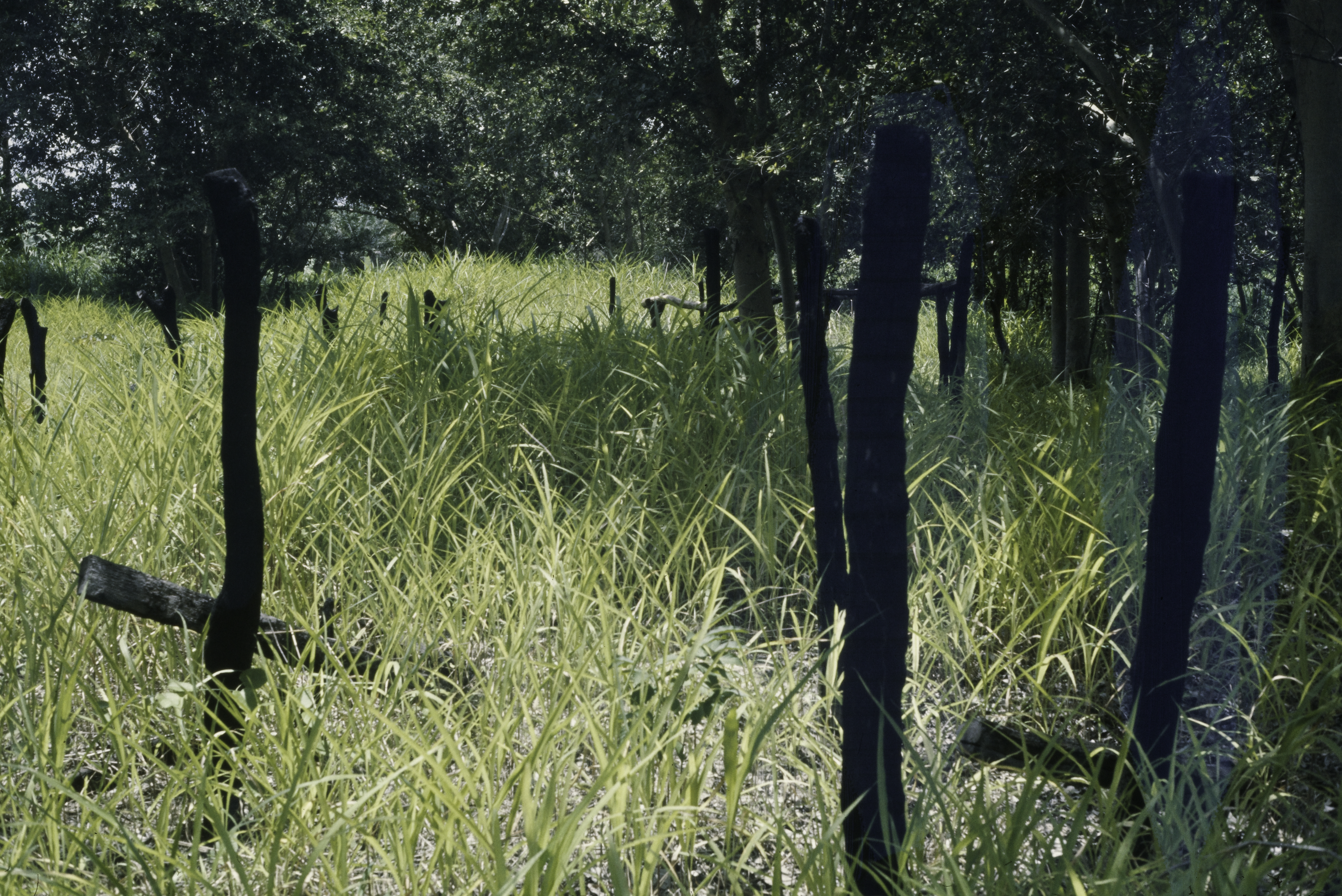
Village burnt down by the Portuguese, 1974.

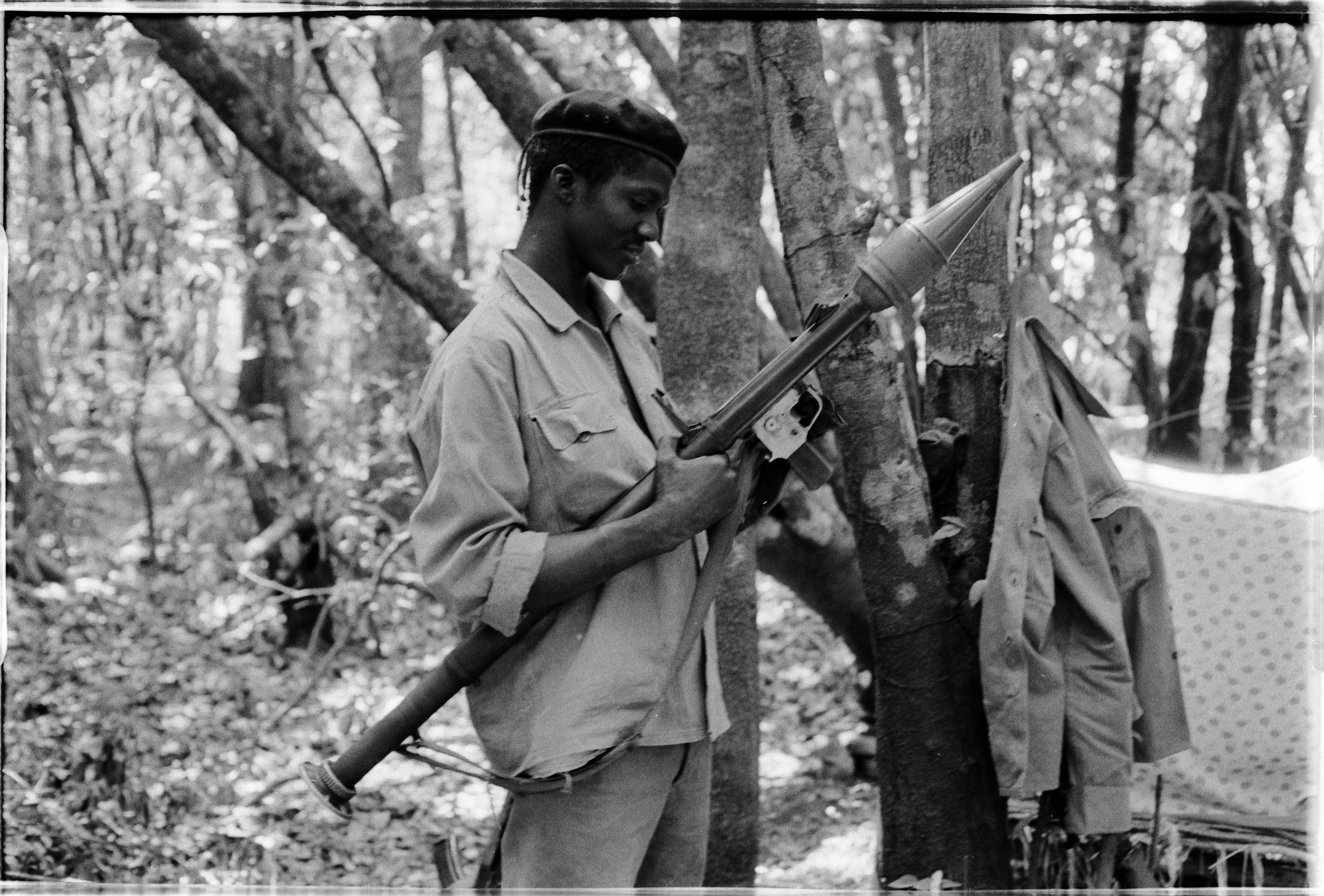
PAIGC soldier with a rocket-propelled grenade at Manten military base in the liberated areas, 1974.

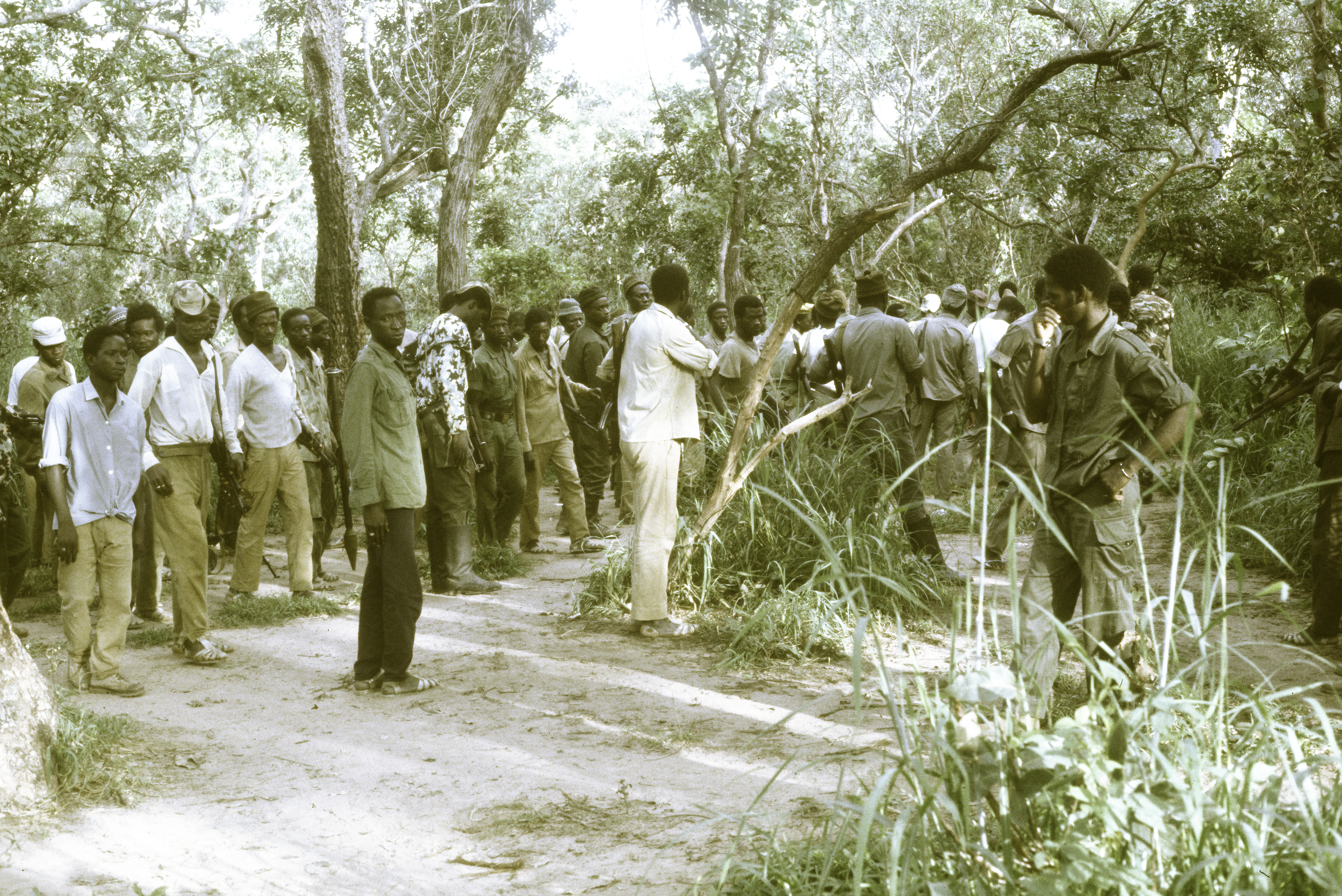
Morning roll call in Hermangono, 1974.

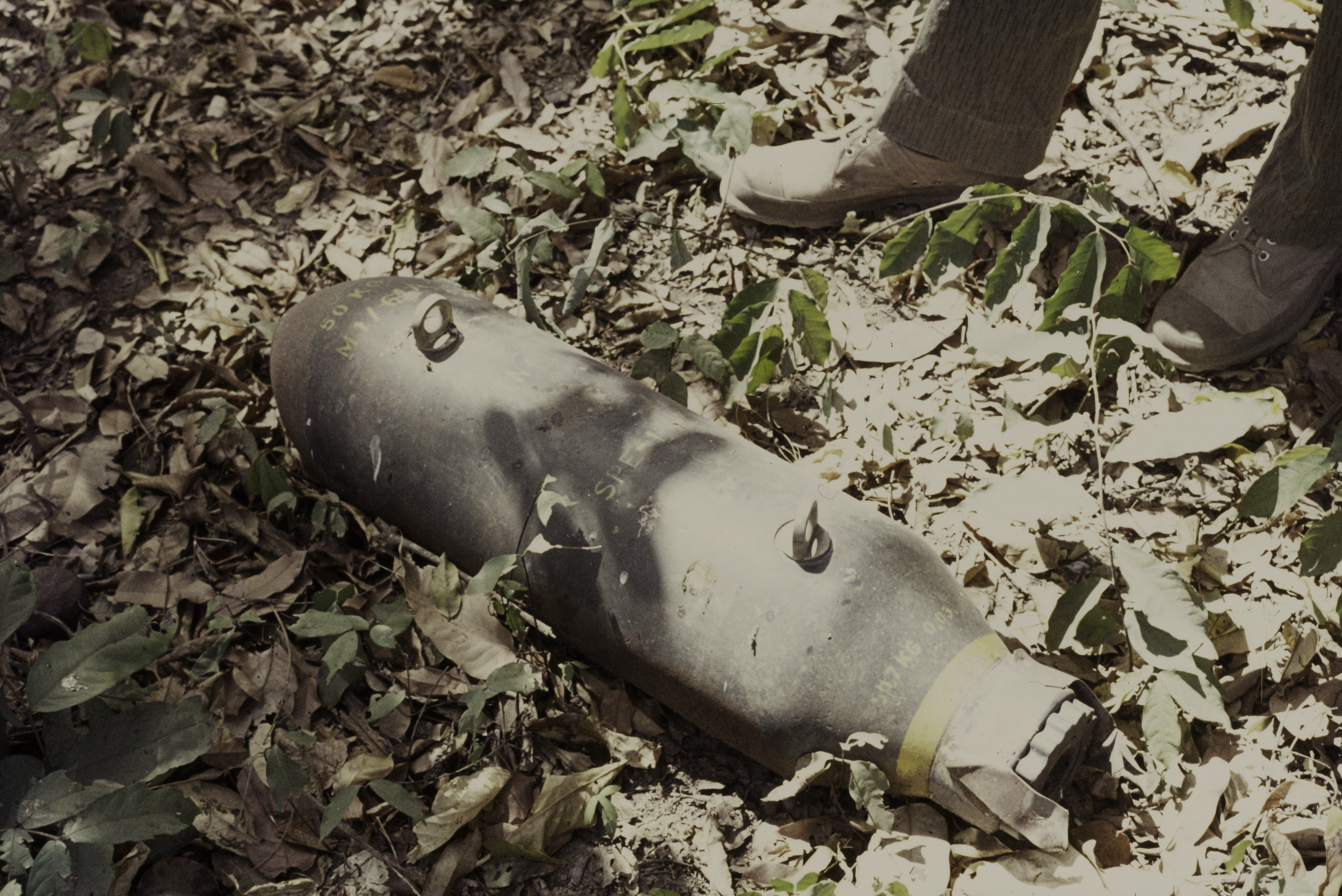
Unexploded Portuguese bomb in Canjambari, 1974.

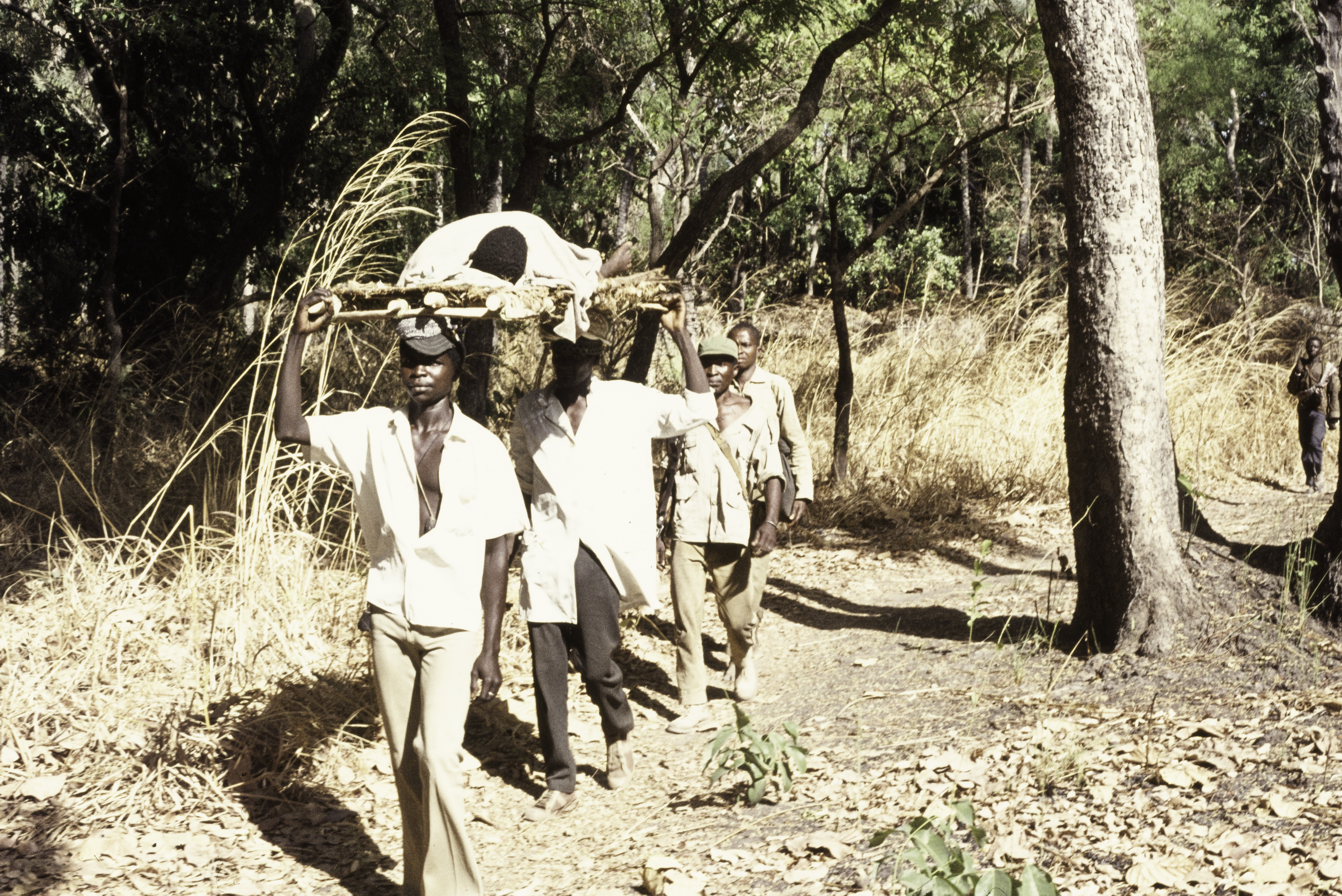
Armed escort carries a wounded person from Sara to the Senegalese border, 1974.

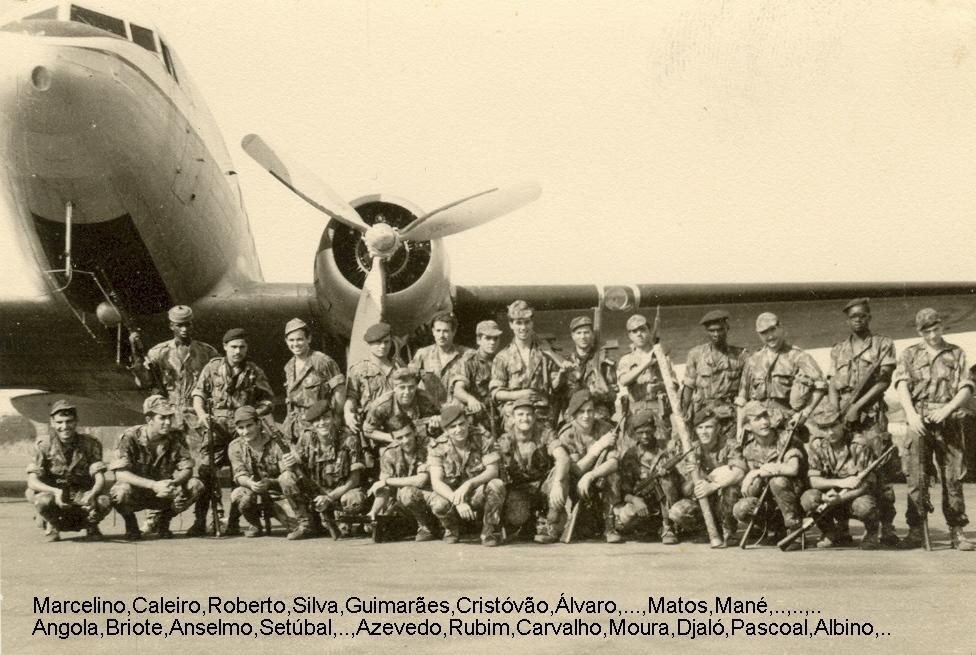
Portuguese commandos en route to Bafatá in 1966.

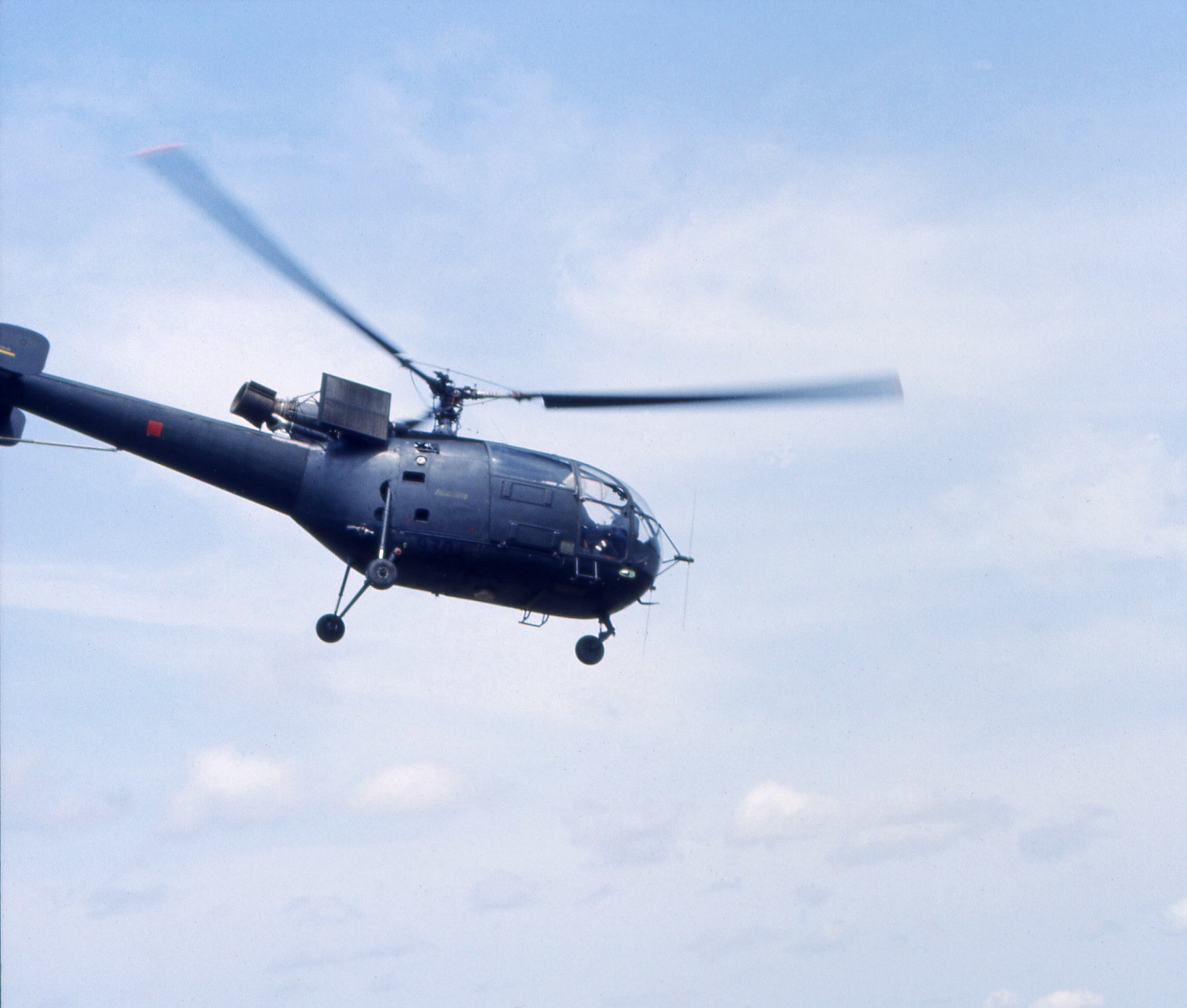
Portuguese Alouette III conducting a sanitary evac.

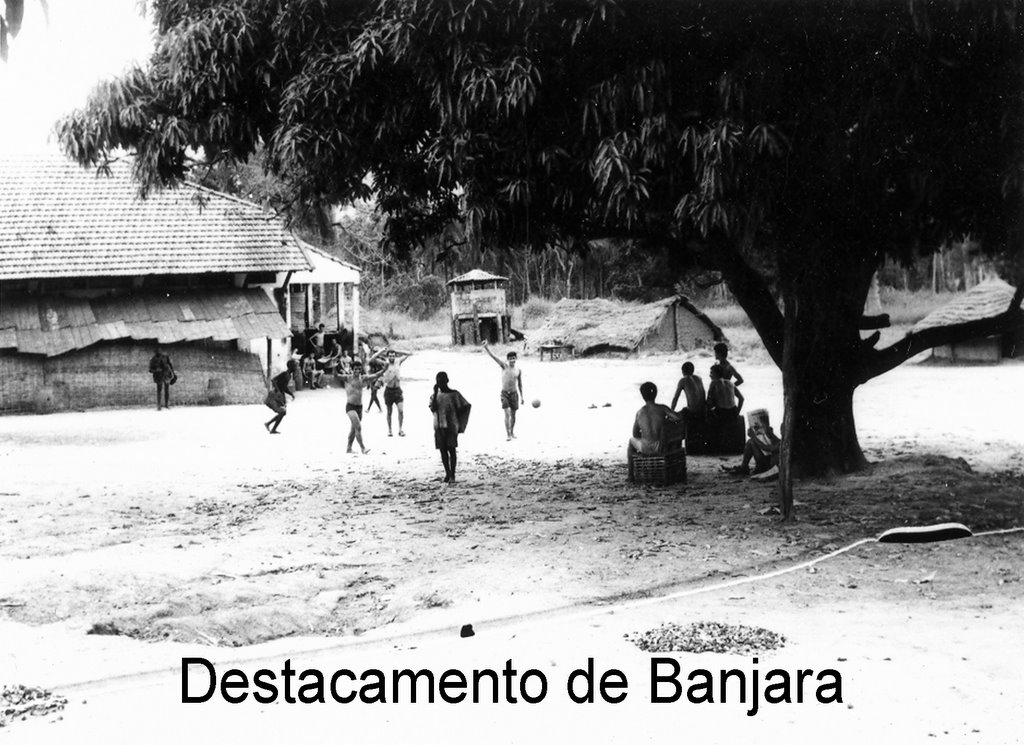
Portuguese army barracks at Banjara.

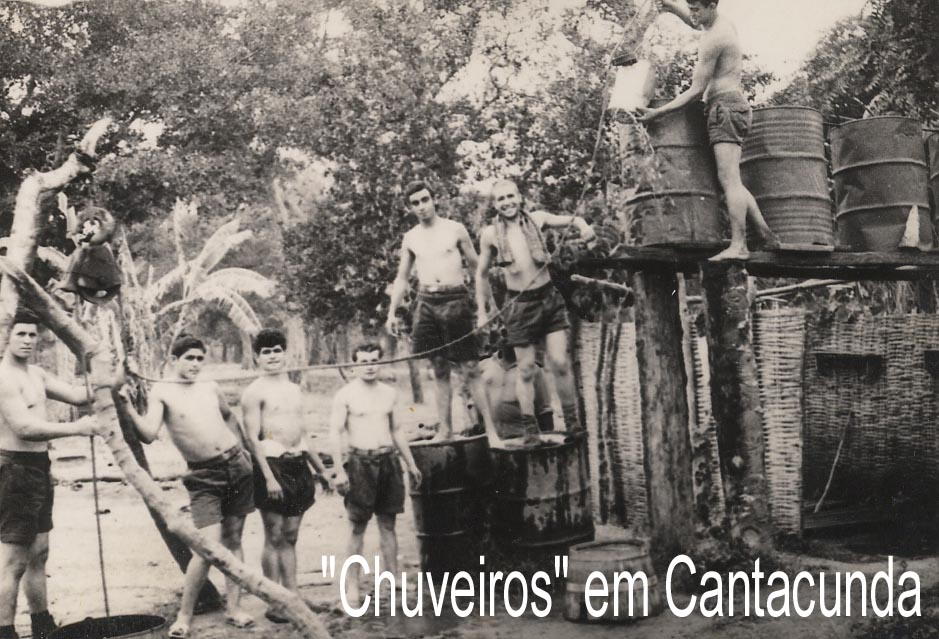
Portuguese forces showers at Cantacunda in 1968.

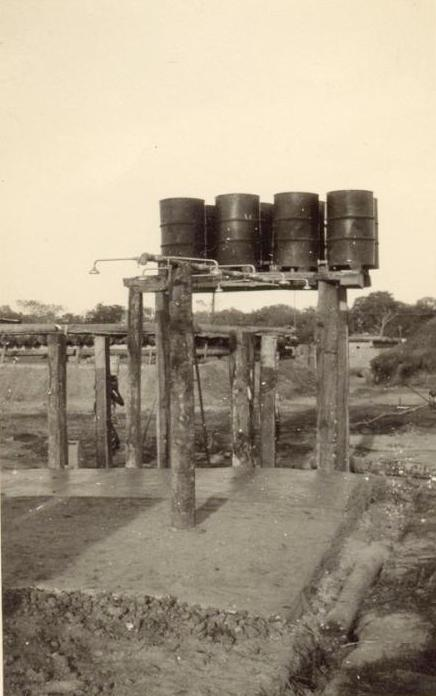
Portuguese showers at Mansambo, 1968.

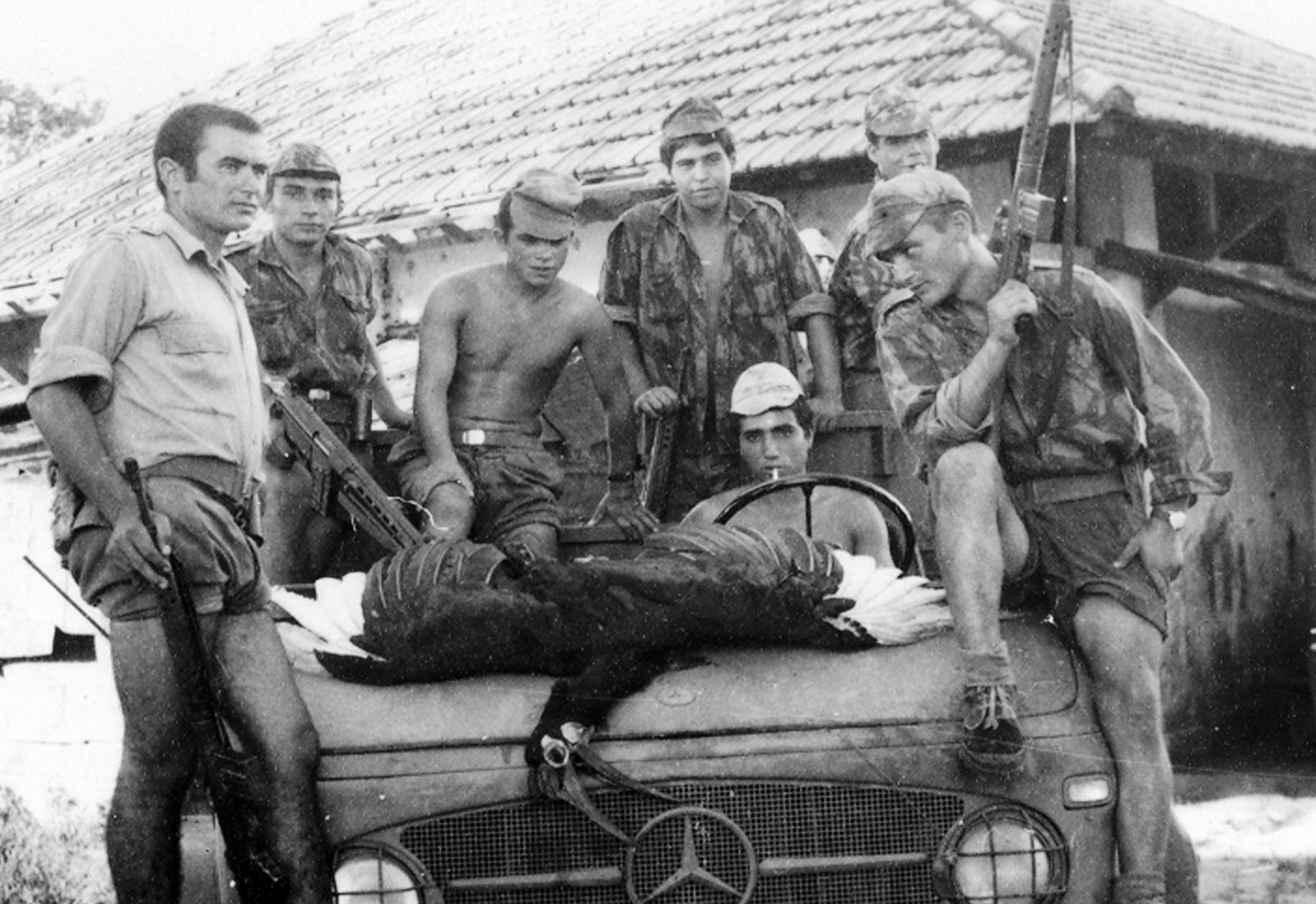
Portuguese soldiers in Guinea with hunted game, 1968.

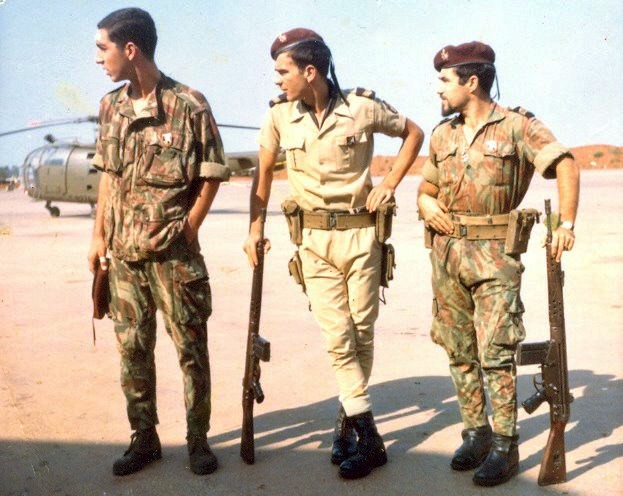
Portuguese troops in Bissalanca in 1965 or 1966.

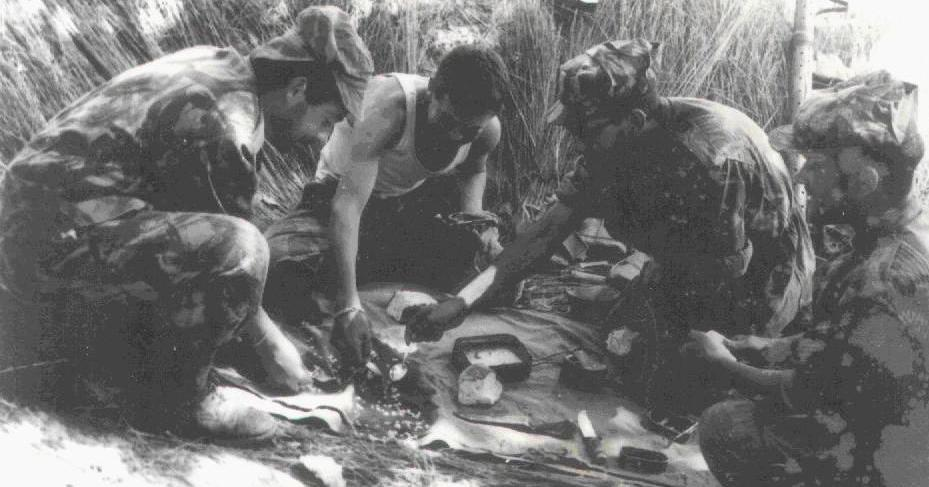
Portuguese troops eating rations on the cloth of a tent laid out on the ground.

== See also ==
- Portuguese Colonial War
- Guinea-Bissau Civil War
