= Ipanema (disambiguation) =

Ipanema is an Old Tupi term meaning "bad water", i.e. a body of water that is unsuitable to a certain task (from y "water" + panema "barren, contaminated, unhealthy, unlucky"). It can refer to:

== Places ==
- Ipanema, Rio de Janeiro, a neighborhood in Rio de Janeiro city, Brazil
- Ipanema, Minas Gerais, Brazil
- Ipanema, Rio Grande do Sul, a neighborhood in Porto Alegre, Brazil
- Ipanema River in Alagoas and Pernambuco, Brazil
- Conceição de Ipanema, Minas Gerais, Brazil
- Fazenda Ipanema, São Paulo, Brazil, a small settlement near Iperó and Boituva
  - Royal Ironworks of St John, Ipanema, called in Portuguese Fundição Ipanema, historical ironworks at Fazenda Ipanema
- Santana do Ipanema, Alagoas, Brazil
- Ipanema Park, Minas Gerais, Brazil

== Persons ==
- José Antônio Moreira, count of Ipanema
- José Antônio Moreira Filho, 2nd Baron of Ipanema
- "The Girl from Ipanema", Brazilian celebrity Heloísa Pinheiro who inspired the eponymous song (see below)

== Popular culture ==
- Ipanema, a British alternative/punk-rock band active between 2002 and 2008, with lead vocalist Darren Brown
- Banda de Ipanema, a famous carnival parade in Rio de Janeiro
- Beyond Ipanema, Brazilian Waves in Global Music, a 2009 documentary movie
- Girl from Ipanema Goes to Greenland, a 1986 single by The B-52's
- "The Girl from Ipanema" (Garota de Ipanema), a bossa nova song written in 1962
- Ipanema (album)

== Other ==
- Embraer EMB 202 Ipanema, an agricultural aircraft from Brazil
- Ipanema bat, the New World leaf-nosed bat species Pygoderma bilabiatum
- Ipanema Atlético Clube, a Brazilian football (soccer) club
- Chevrolet Ipanema, the estate version of the 1989 Brazilian Chevrolet Kadett
- Ipanema (crustacean), a genus of crustaceans in the family Ipanemidae
