= List of most expensive streets by city =

This list of most expensive streets (or neighborhoods) by city shows which areas have the highest rental costs or property values in each country.

== Residential streets ==
=== Africa ===
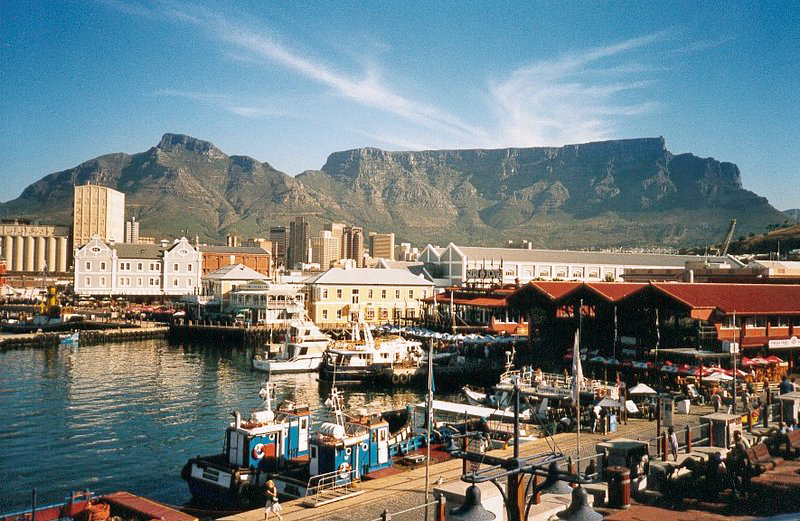
Victoria & Alfred Waterfront in Cape Town

Egypt

- Cairo: Nile Corniche

South Africa

- Cape Town: Nettleton Road, Clifton, Cape Town, De Wet Road, Fresnaye
- Johannesburg: Sandton (sometimes described as "Africa's Richest Square Mile")

=== Asia ===
China

- Beijing: Qianmen Street
- Shanghai: Anfu Road, Century Avenue, Huaihai Road, Sinan Road, Zhongshan Road

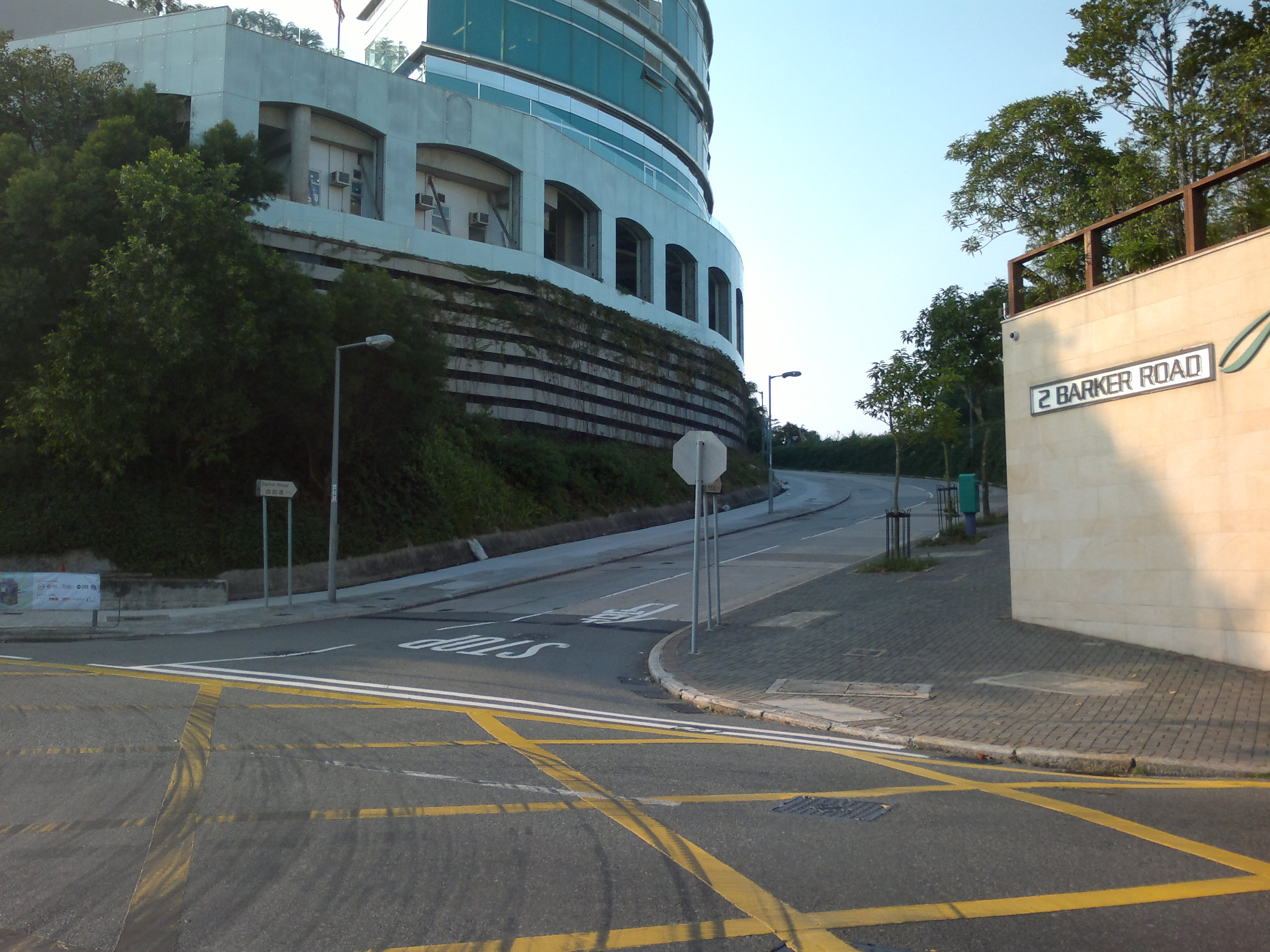
Barker Road on Victoria Peak, Hong Kong

- Hong Kong: Mount Nicholson Road (world’s second most expensive street according to Business Insider), Mount Kellett Road (world’s sixth most expensive street according to Business Insider), Conduit Road (world’s ninth most expensive street according to Business Insider), Deep Water Bay Road, Severn Road, Barker Road

India

- Mumbai: Altamount Road
- Delhi: Amrita Shergill Marg, Dr APJ Abdul Kalam Road

Israel

- Herzliya: Galei Tchelet, Galei Kinneret
- Tel Aviv: Hayarkon Street, Kikar Hamedina, Herbert Samuel Street

Singapore

- Nassim Road

Turkey

- Istanbul: Bağdat Avenue, Bebek, Etiler and Rumelihisarı

Vietnam

- Hanoi: Hàng Bông Street

=== Europe ===
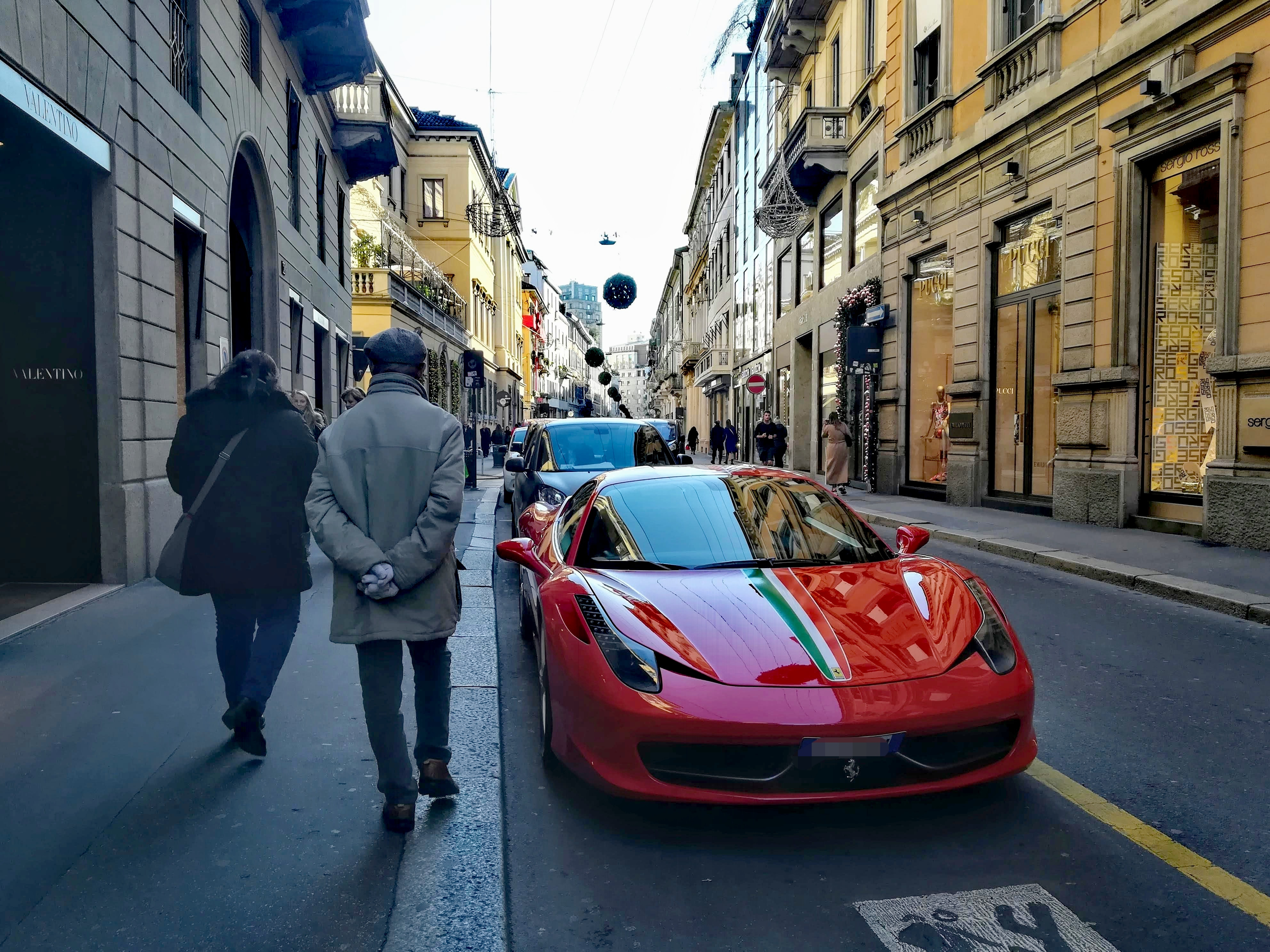
Via Monte Napoleone, Milan

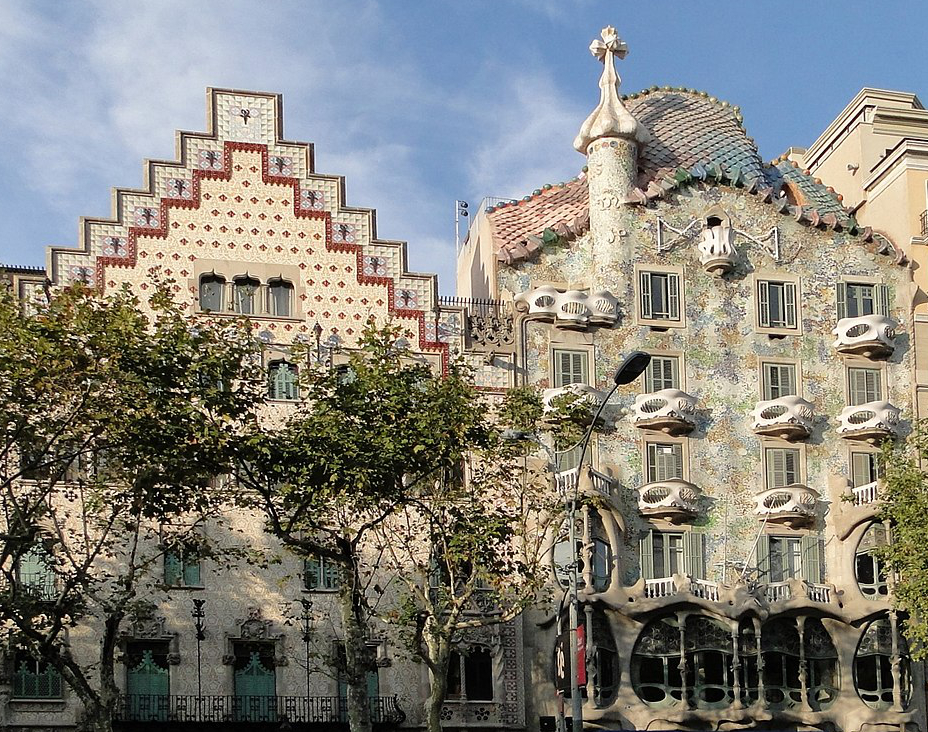
Passeig de Gràcia, Barcelona

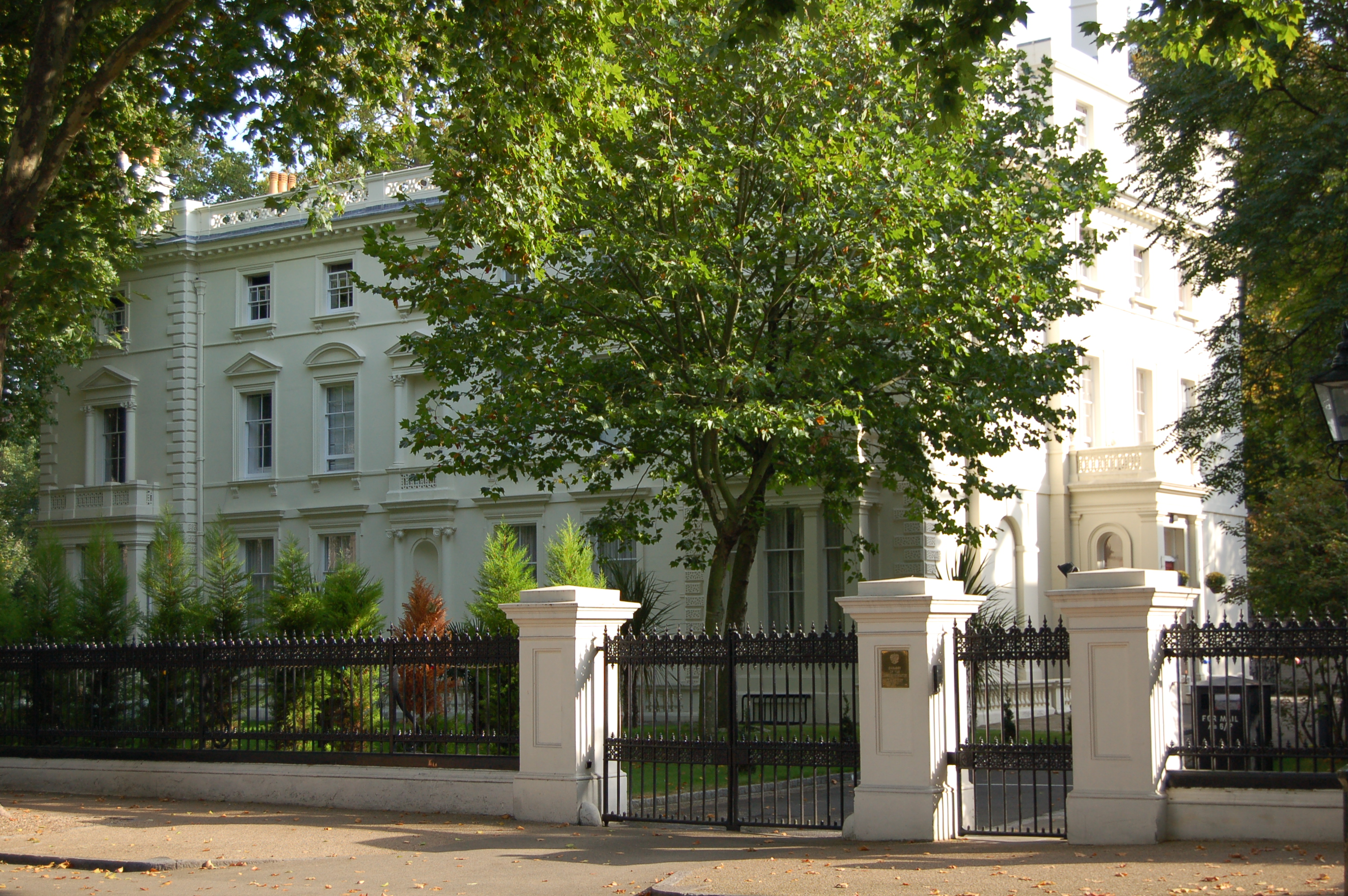
Kensington Palace Gardens, London

Austria

- Vienna: Kohlmarkt, Tuchlauben, Opernring, Gloriettegasse, Kuppelwiesergasse, Larochegasse, Münichreiterstraße, Schreiberweg, Cottagegasse, Schweizertalstraße, Himmelstraße, Bellevuestraße

Belgium

- Antwerp: Cockerillkaai
- Bruges: Zilverstraat
- Brussels: Avenue des Châlets/Kasteeltjeslaan
- Ghent: Vogelmarkt
- Hasselt: Guido Gezellestraat
- Leuven: Rector de Somerplein

Bosnia and Herzegovina

- Sarajevo: Ulica Ferhadija, Titova ulica, Marijin Dvor

Bulgaria

- Varna: Old Greek Quarter

Denmark

- Hellerup: Hambros Allé

France

- Paris: Rue de Furstemberg, Quai des Orfèvres, Avenue Montaigne, Rue de l'Abbaye, Rue Guynemer
- Cannes-Antibes: Promenade de la Croisette, Boulevard Eugène Gazagnaire, Boulevard J. F. Kennedy, Boulevard de Baçon, Avenue Tour Gandolphe
- Nice: Avenue Jean Lorrain, Avenue Germaine, Boulevard Princesse de Monaco

Germany

- Kampen (Sylt): Hobookenweg
- Berlin: Inselstraße, Königsallee, Am Sandwerder, Im Dol, Paulinenstraße, Weddigenweg
- Munich: Maria-Theresia-Straße and Schlossrondell.

Greece

- Athens: Herodou Attikou Street

Ireland

- Dublin: Shrewsbury Road, Ailesbury Road, Herbert Park

Italy

- Milan: Via Monte Napoleone
- Milan: Via Manzoni
- Milan: Via Borgospesso
- Capri: Via Camerelle
- Rome: Via Condotti
- Milan: Via dell’Orso
- Milan: Via Borgonuovo
- Milan: Via della Spiga
- Milan: Via Conservatorio
- Milan: Via Rovello

Monaco

- Avenue Princesse Grace

Netherlands

- Aerdenhout:
  - Leeuwerikenlaan
  - Zwaluwenweg
- Wassenaar: Konijnenlaan

Poland

- Warsaw: Nowy Świat Street, Marszałkowska Street, Three Crosses Square

Romania

- Bucharest: Dorobanți Road

Russia

- Moscow: Ostozhenka, Molochny Pereulok

Spain

- Madrid: Serrano, Camino del Sur (La Moraleja), Calle Castillo de Aysa, Paseo de los Lagos (Pozuelo de Alarcón), Avenida Miraflores
- Barcelona: Passeig de Gràcia
- Málaga: Larios Street, La Zagaleta
- Valencia: Carrer de Colom
- Palma de Mallorca: Paseig d'alt de la muralla, Carrer Miramall y Palau, La Portella, Carrer Juan Margallen, Paseig Maritim, Carrer Francisco Vidal i Sureda

Sweden

- Gothenburg: Lilletummens väg, Olof Skötkonungsgatan
- Lomma: Norra Villavägen
- Stockholm: Constantiavägen, Drakskeppsvägen, Frejavägen (Danderyd), Grönviksvägen, Majvägen, Norevägen, Strandvägen (Östermalm), Villavägen (Danderyd)

Switzerland

- St Moritz: Via Suvretta

Turkey

- Istanbul: İstiklal Avenue

United Kingdom

- Edinburgh: Ettrick Road in Merchiston, Northumberland Street, Heriot Row, Ann Street in New Town, Cumin Place, Nile Grove on the Southside
- London: The Bishops Avenue, N2, East Finchley, top sales price £65,000,000
- London: Kensington Palace Gardens, W8, Kensington, average sales price £36,066,148
- London: Eaton Square, SW1, Belgravia, average sales price £4,035,001
- London: Belgrave Square, SW1 Belgravia
- London: Wilton Crescent, SW1 Belgravia
- London: Grosvenor Square, W1 Mayfair (world’s fifth most expensive street)
- London: Parkside, SW19 Wimbledon, average sales price £5,058,000
- London: Wycombe Square, W8 Kensington, average sales price £4,415,000
- London: Blenheim Crescent, W11 Holland Park, average sales price £4,346,000
- London: Mallord Street, SW3 Chelsea, average sales price £4,091,000
- London: Drayton Gardens, SW10 Chelsea, average sales price £4,011,000
- London: Hampstead Lane, N6 Hampstead, average sales price £3,657,000
- London: Broad Walk, N21 Winchmore Hill, average sales price £3,619,000
- London: Cedar Park Gardens, SW19 Wimbledon, average sales price £3,596,000
- London: Chester Square, SW1 Westminster, average sales price £3,461,000
- London: Duchess Of Bedfords Walk, W8 Kensington, average sales price £3,423,000
- London: Chelsea Park Gardens, SW3 Chelsea, average sales price £3,197,000
- London: Dawson Place, W2 Notting Hill, average sales price £3,141,000

=== North America ===
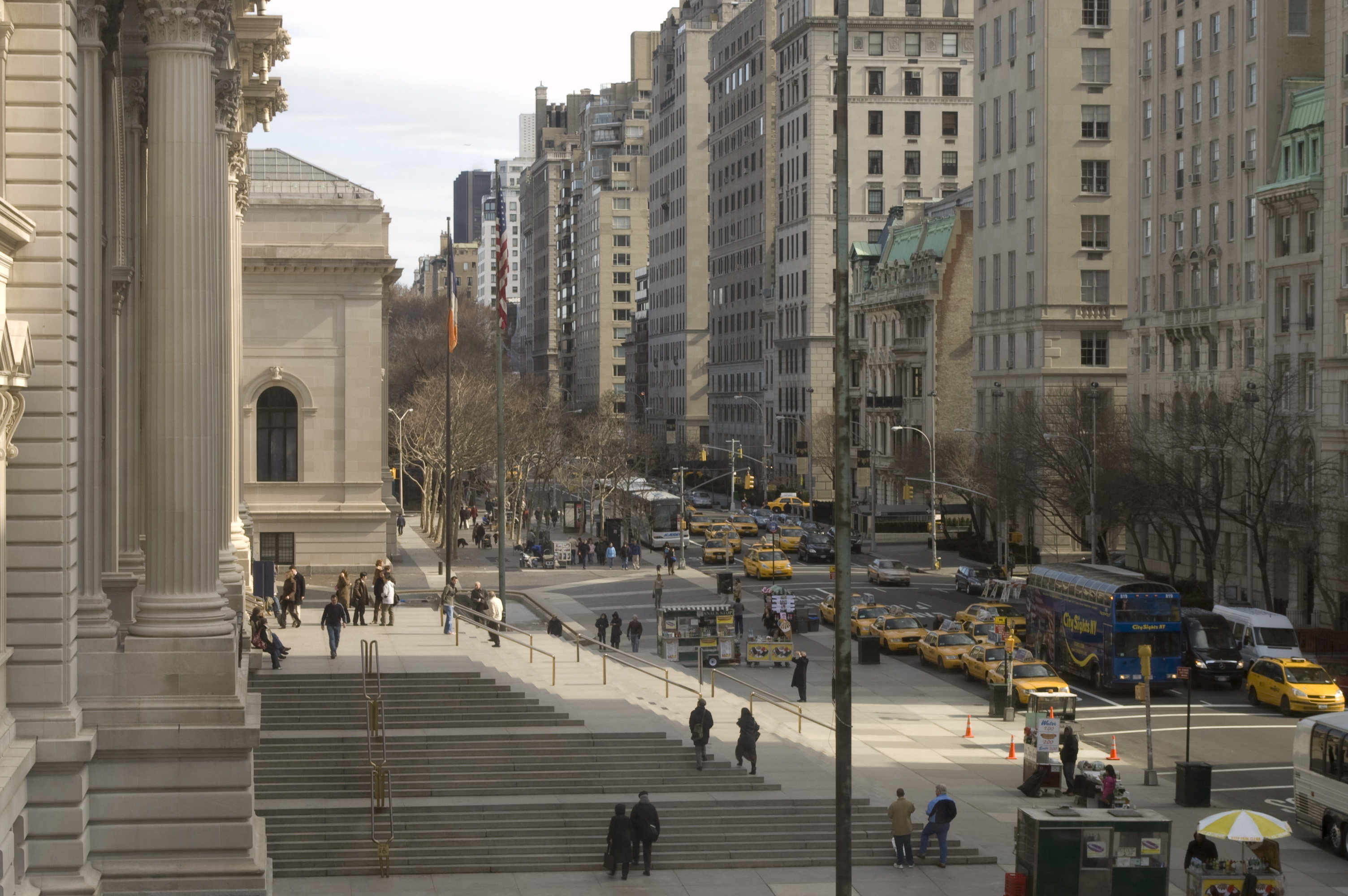
5th Avenue, New York

Canada

- Calgary, Alberta:
  - Pump Hill Close
  - Roxboro
  - Mount Royal
- Vancouver, British Columbia:
  - Dunbar-Southlands, Shaughnessy
  - West Point Grey
- West Vancouver, British Columbia:
  - Radcliffe Avenue
  - Belmont Avenue
  - Westmount
- Winnipeg, Manitoba:
  - Wellington Crescent
  - Old Tuxedo
- Ottawa, Ontario:
  - Belmont Avenue

United States

- Atherton, California:
  - Walsh Road (median home price US$8 million as of 2019)
- Atlanta, Georgia:
  - Paces Ferry Road
  - Tuxedo Road
- Boston, Massachusetts:
  - Louisburg Square (average 2019 home price $4.8M)
  - Charles River Square
  - Union Street
- San Antonio, Texas
  - Admirals Way
- Houston, Texas:
  - River Oaks Boulevard
  - Lazy Lane Boulevard
  - Carnarvon Drive
- Los Angeles, California:
  - Pacific Coast Highway (world’s eighth most expensive street according to Business Insider),
- New York, New York:
  - 57th Street (world’s most expensive street according to Business Insider)
  - Central Park South (59th Street) (world’s third most expensive street)
  - Park Avenue (world’s fourth most expensive street)
  - 5th Avenue (world’s seventh most expensive street)
  - Central Park West
- Palm Beach, Florida:
  - S. Ocean Blvd. (world’s tenth most expensive street according to Business Insider),

=== Oceania ===
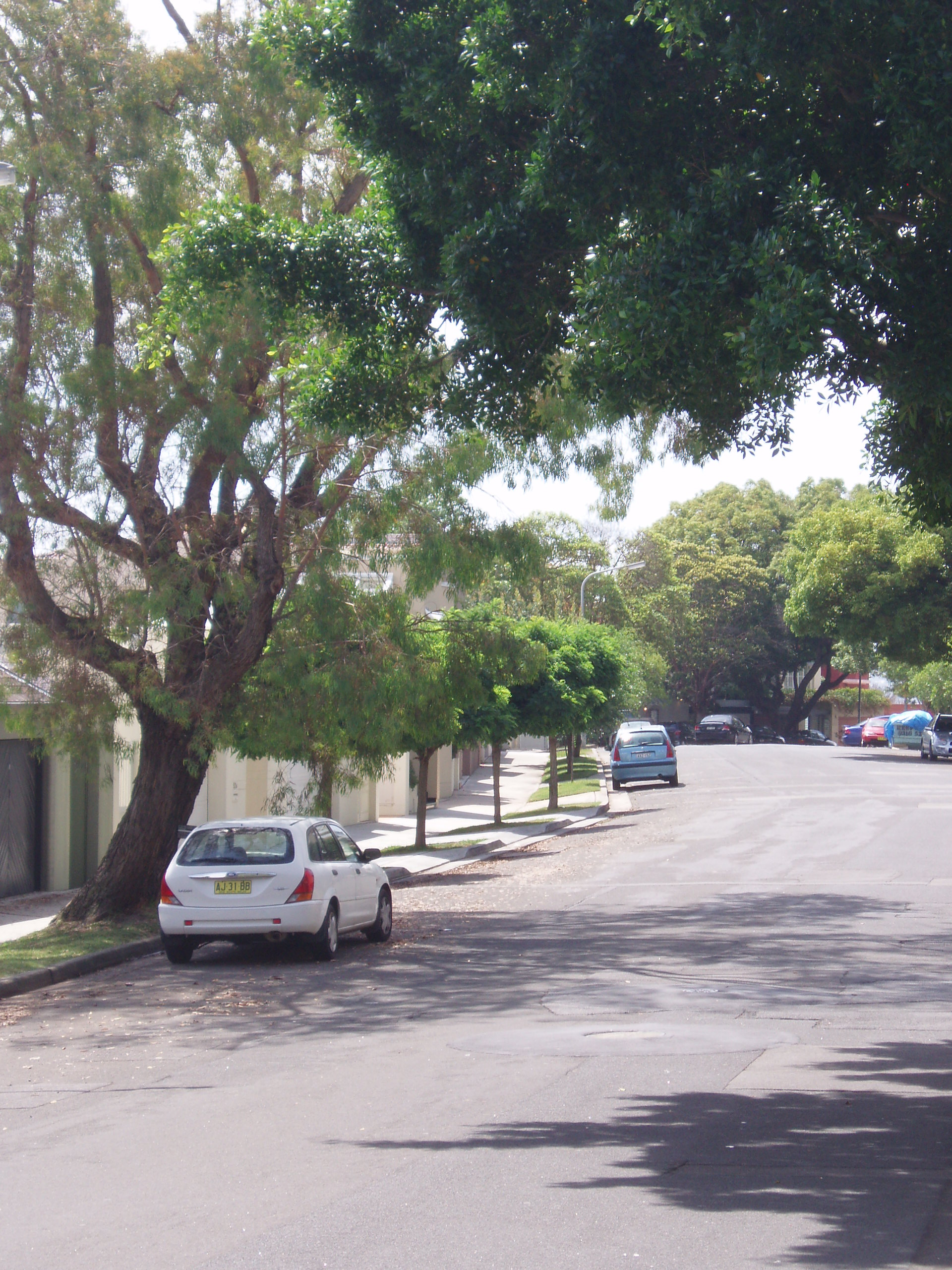
Wolseley Road in Sydney is the 10th most expensive residential street in the world at $US28,000 sqm (2010).

Australia

- Sydney: Wolseley Road (Point Piper)
- Melbourne: St Georges Road, Albany Road (Toorak)

New Zealand

- Auckland: Cremorne Street, Herne Bay

=== South America ===
Brazil

- Rio de Janeiro: Avenida Vieira Souto (Ipanema Beach) into Avenida Delfim Moreira (Leblon Beach) and Avenida Prefeito Mendes de Moraes (São Conrado)
- São Paulo: Avenida Europa, Avenida Higienópolis, Avenida Amarilis,

Uruguay

- Punta del Este: Rambla Lorenzo Batlle Pacheco

== Commercial streets ==
=== Africa ===
Egypt

- Cairo: Talaat Harb Street

South Africa

- Cape Town: Victoria & Alfred Waterfront

=== Asia ===
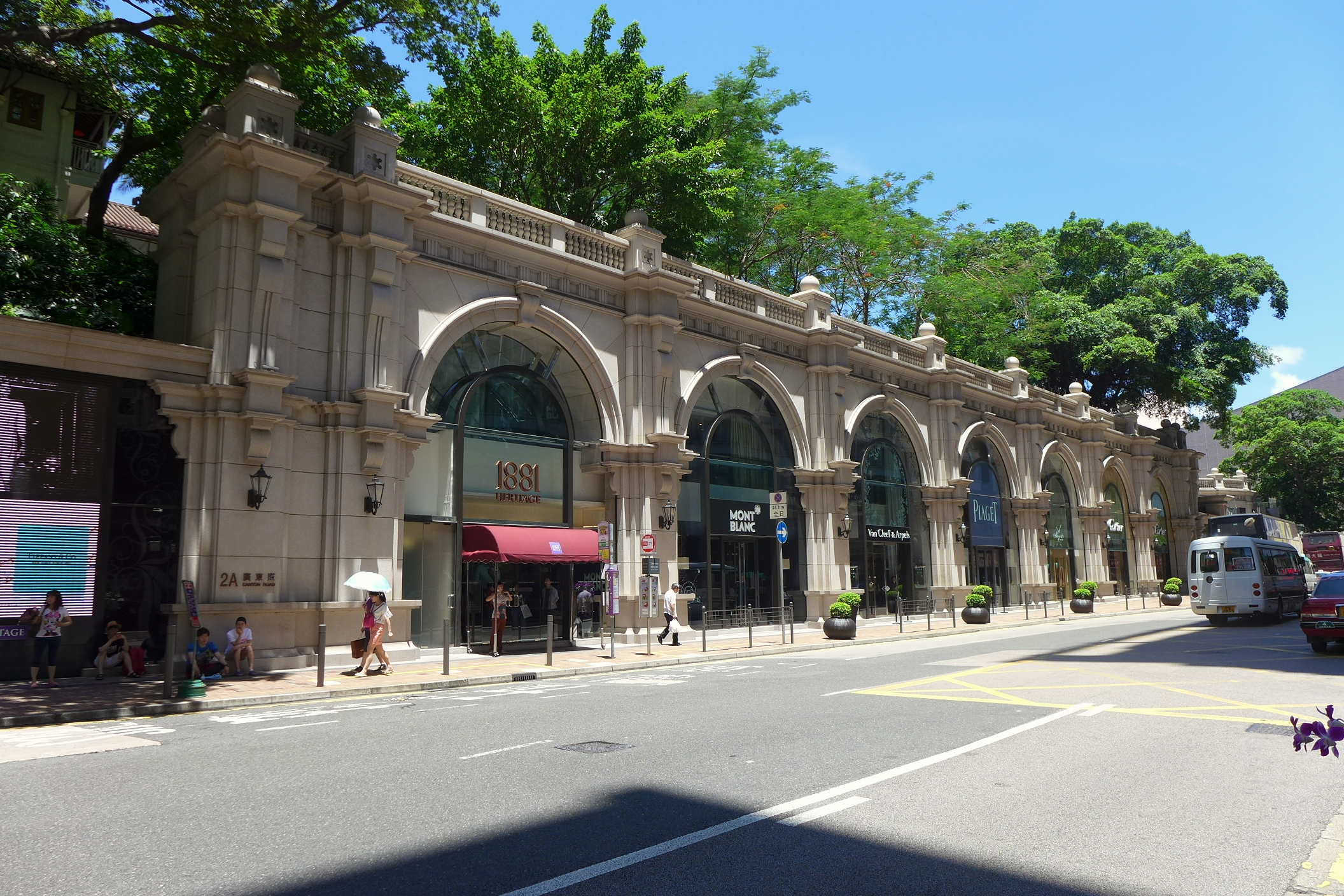
Canton Road, Hong Kong

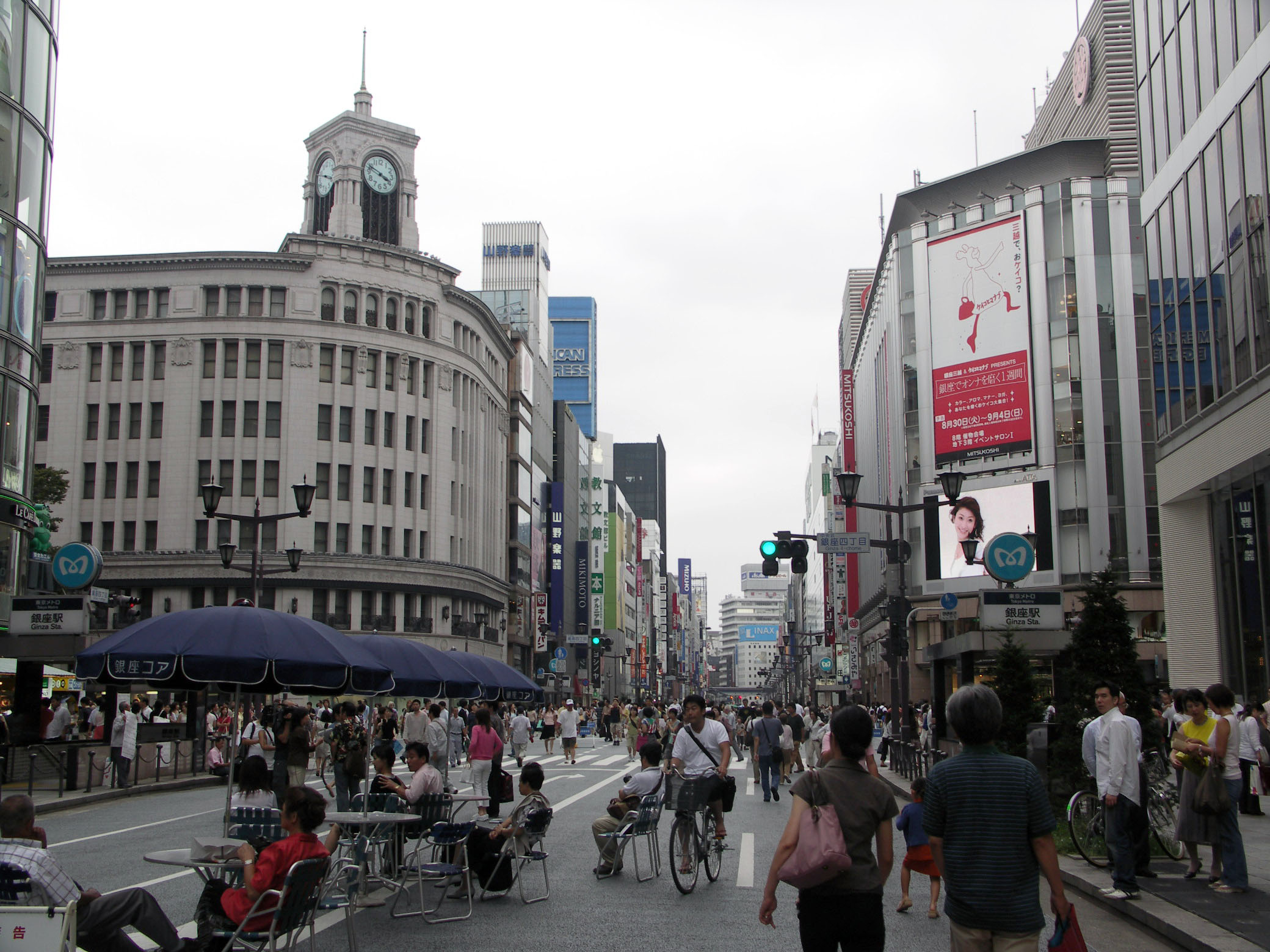
Ginza in Tokyo

China

- Beijing: Qianmen Street, Wangfujing
- Shanghai: Anfu Road, Century Avenue, Huaihai Road, Nanjing Road, Sinan Road, Zhongshan Road

Hong Kong

- Causeway Bay: Russell Street
- Tsim Sha Tsui: Canton Road

India

- New Delhi: Khan Market

Iran

- Karaj: Taleghani, Gohardasht, Golshahr, Jahanshahr, Mehrshahr

Japan

- Osaka: Umeda
- Tokyo: Ginza

Philippines

- Metro Manila: Ayala Avenue, Makati

Singapore

- Orchard Road

=== Europe ===
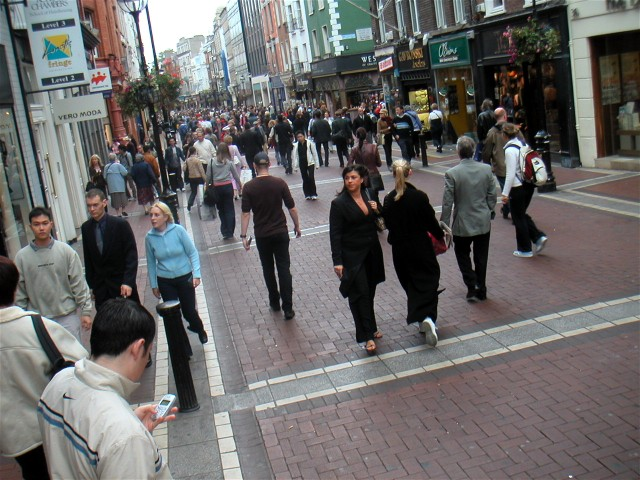
Grafton Street, Dublin

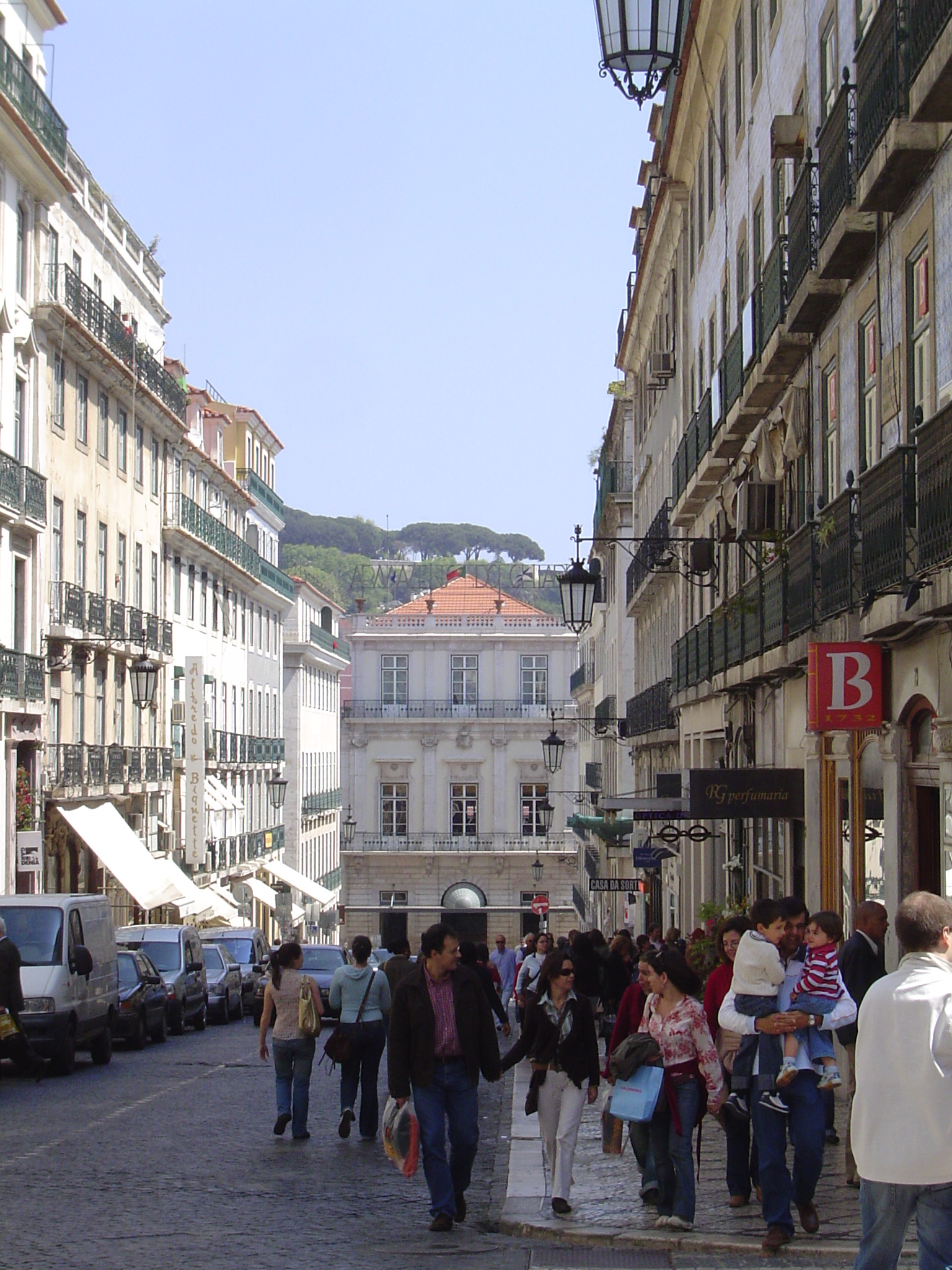
Rua Garrett in Chiado Lisbon

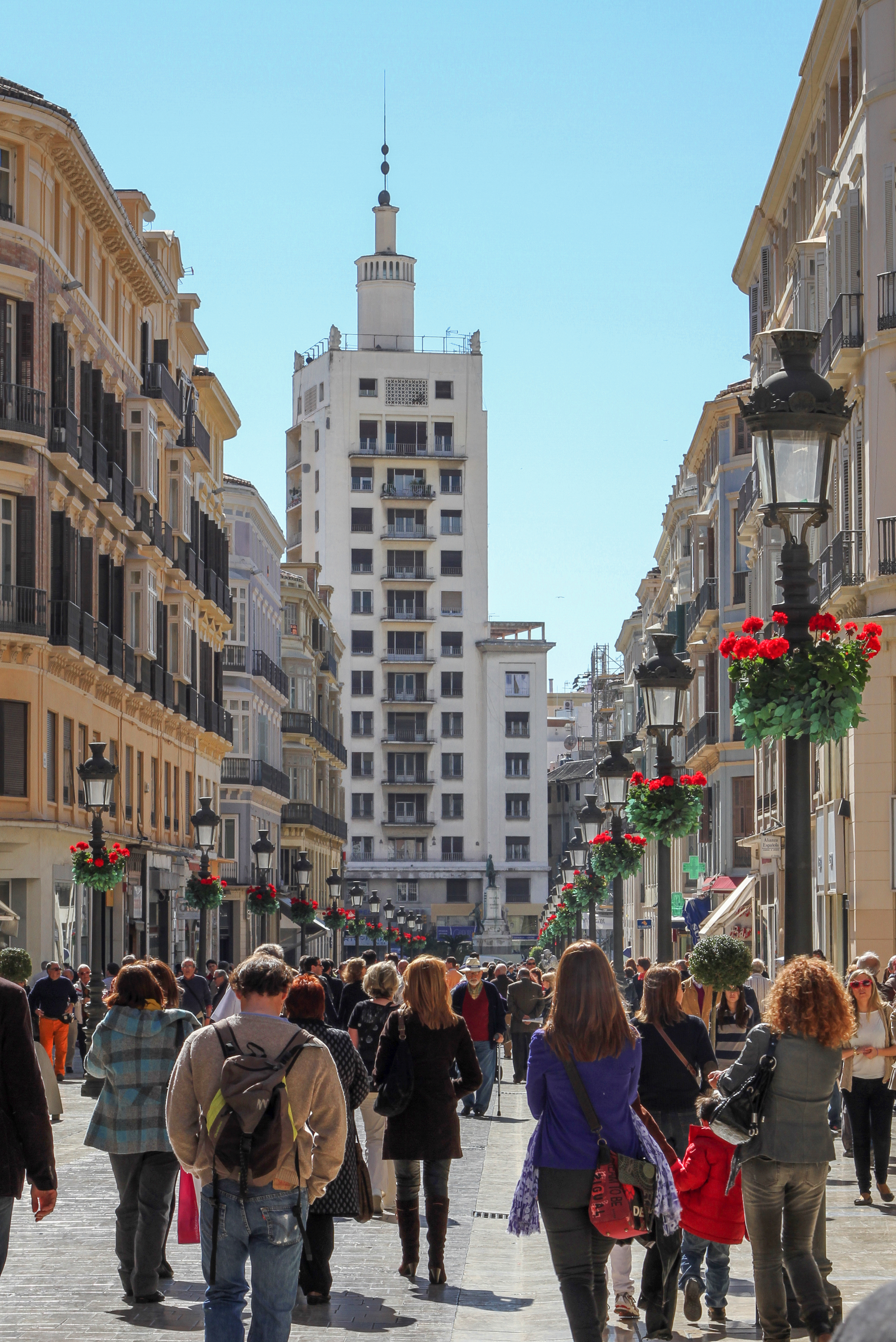
Larios Street in Málaga

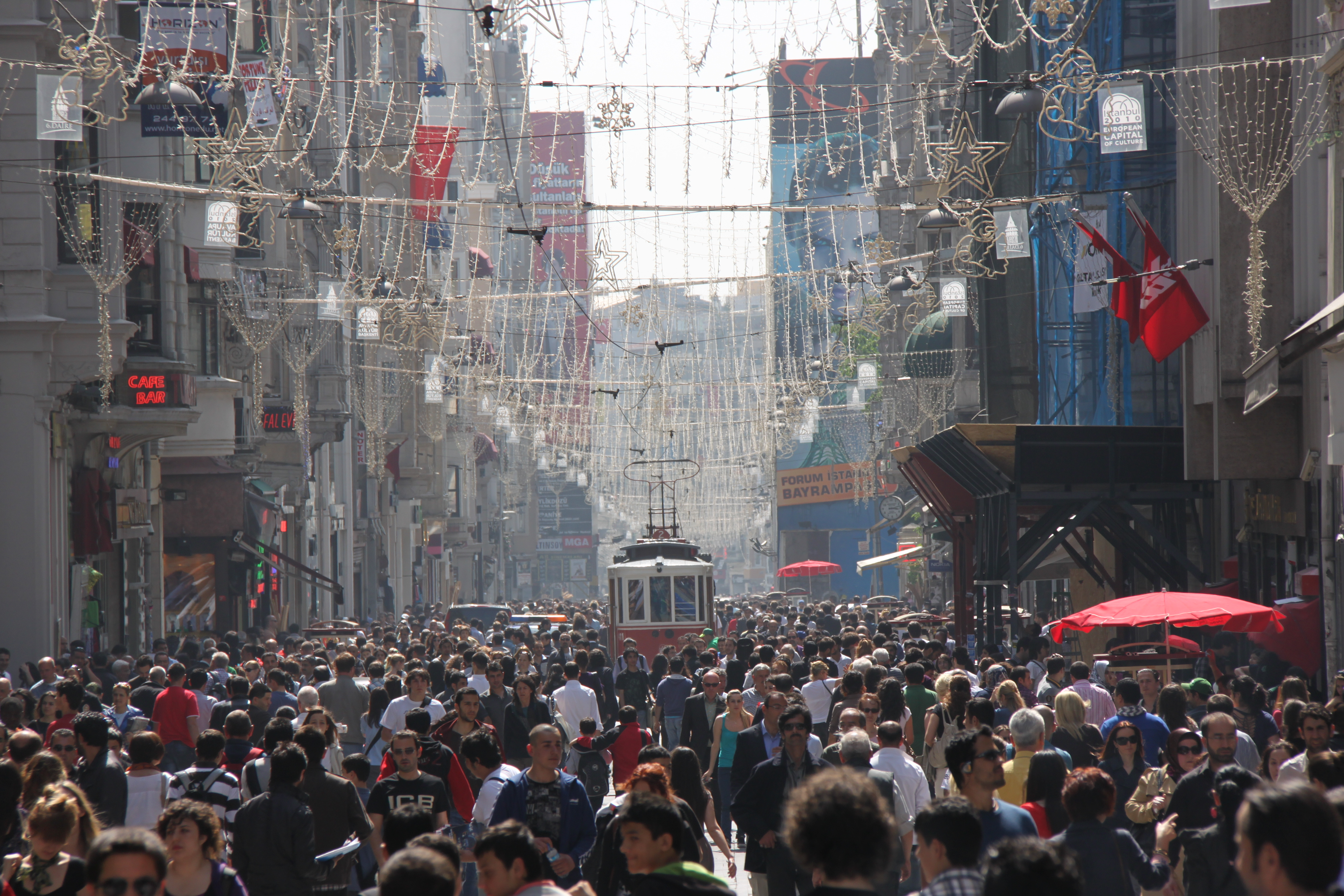
İstiklal Avenue in Istanbul

Belgium

- Antwerp: Meir
- Brussels: Rue Neuve

Bulgaria

- Sofia: Vitosha Boulevard
- Varna: Prince Boris I Boulevard

Estonia

- Tallinn: Viru street

France

- Paris: Avenue des Champs-Élysées

Germany

- Berlin: Friedrichstraße, Kurfürstendamm
- Munich: Kaufingerstraße,

Greece

- Athens: Ermou Street

Hungary

- Budapest: Andrássy Avenue

Ireland

- Dublin: Grafton Street

Italy

- Milan: Via Monte Napoleone
- Milan: Via Quadronno
- Milan: Corso Venezia

Netherlands

- Amsterdam: Kalverstraat

Poland

- Warsaw: Nowy Świat Street

Portugal

- Lisbon: Avenida da Liberdade

Romania

- Bucharest: Magheru Boulevard
- Bucharest: Victory Avenue

Russia

- Moscow: Tverskaya Street

Spain

- Barcelona: Portal de l'Àngel
- Madrid: Calle Preciados
- Málaga: Larios Street

Sweden

- Stockholm: Biblioteksgatan, Västerlånggatan

Switzerland

- Zürich: Bahnhofstrasse

United Kingdom

- London: Bond Street, Brompton Road, Coventry Street, Oxford Street

=== North America ===
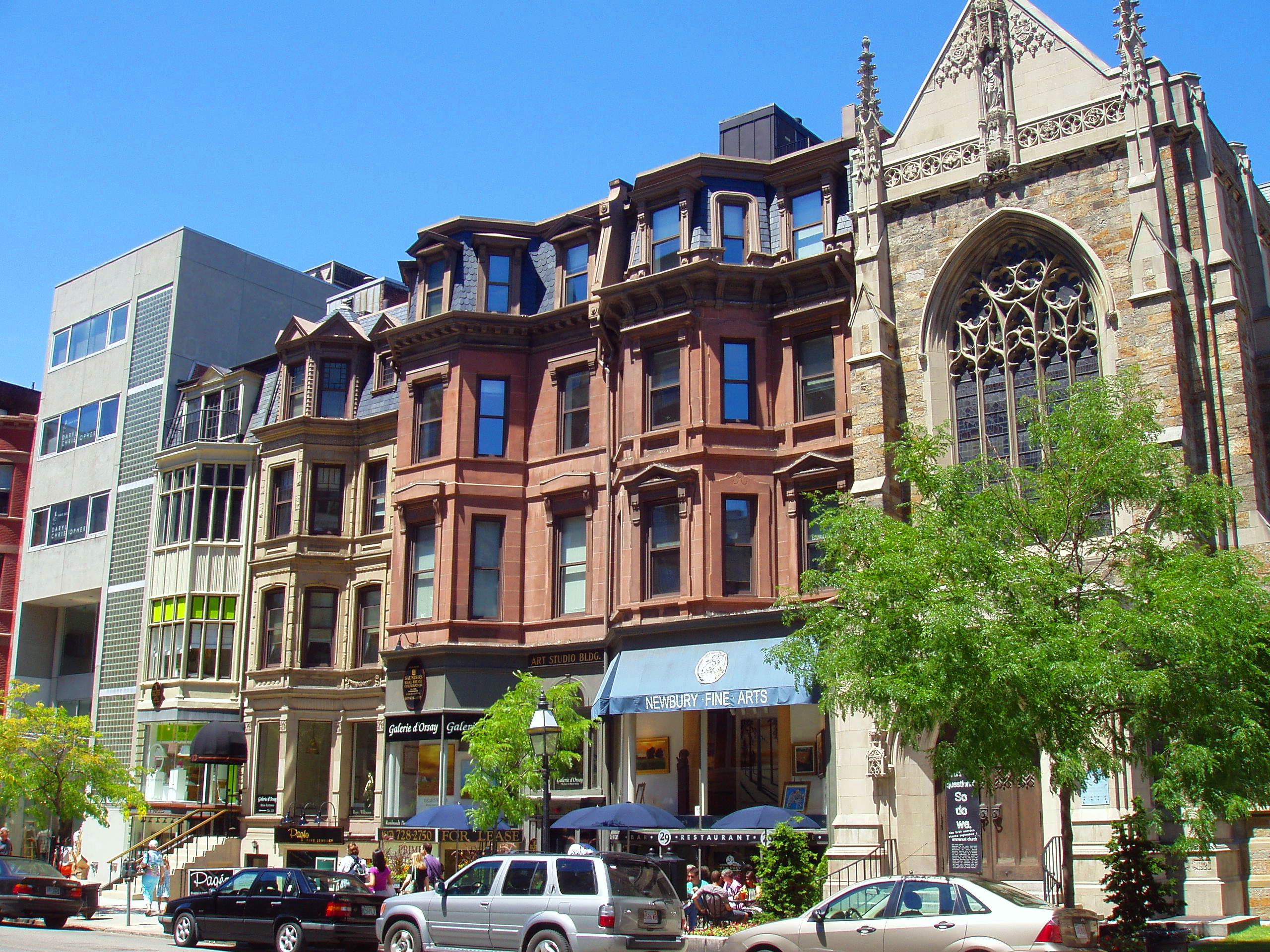
Newbury Street, Boston

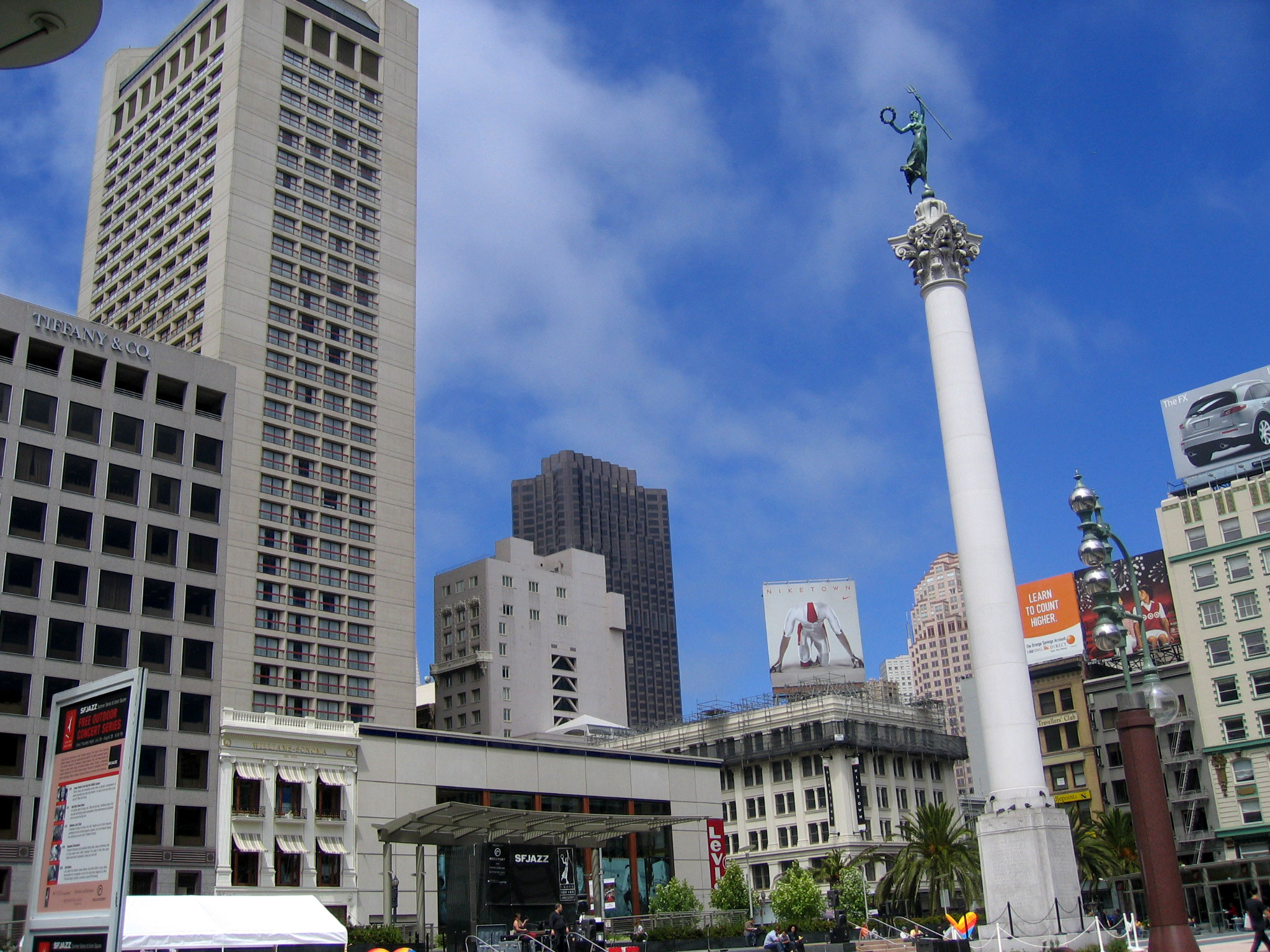
Union Square, San Francisco

Canada

- Toronto, Ontario: Bay Street, Bloor Street (Mink Mile), Yonge Street,

Mexico

- Mexico City: Avenida Presidente Masaryk, Paseo de la Reforma

United States

- Boston, Massachusetts: Newbury Street
- Chicago, Illinois: North Michigan Avenue (Magnificent Mile)
- New York City, New York: Madison Avenue, 5th Avenue
- Philadelphia, Pennsylvania: Walnut Street (Rittenhouse Row)
- San Francisco, California: Union Square
- Beverly Hills, California: Rodeo Drive

=== South America ===
Argentina

- Buenos Aires: Florida Street
- Buenos Aires: Alvear Avenue

Brazil

- Rio de Janeiro: Rua Garcia D'Avila
- São Paulo: Rua Oscar Freire
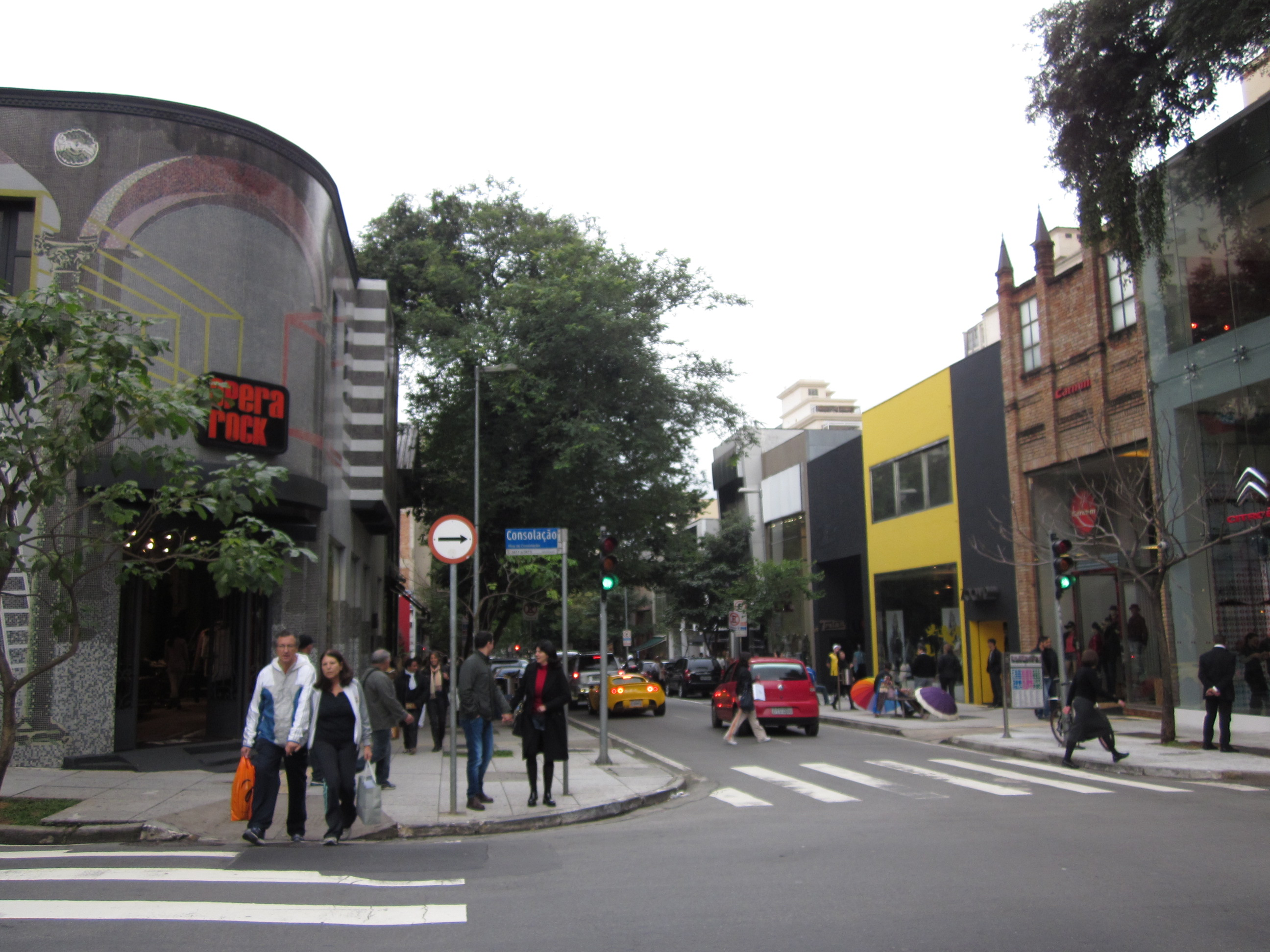
  Rua Oscar Freire, São Paulo

== See also ==
- List of shopping streets and districts by city
