= Rua Farme de Amoedo =

LGBG Street in Brazil

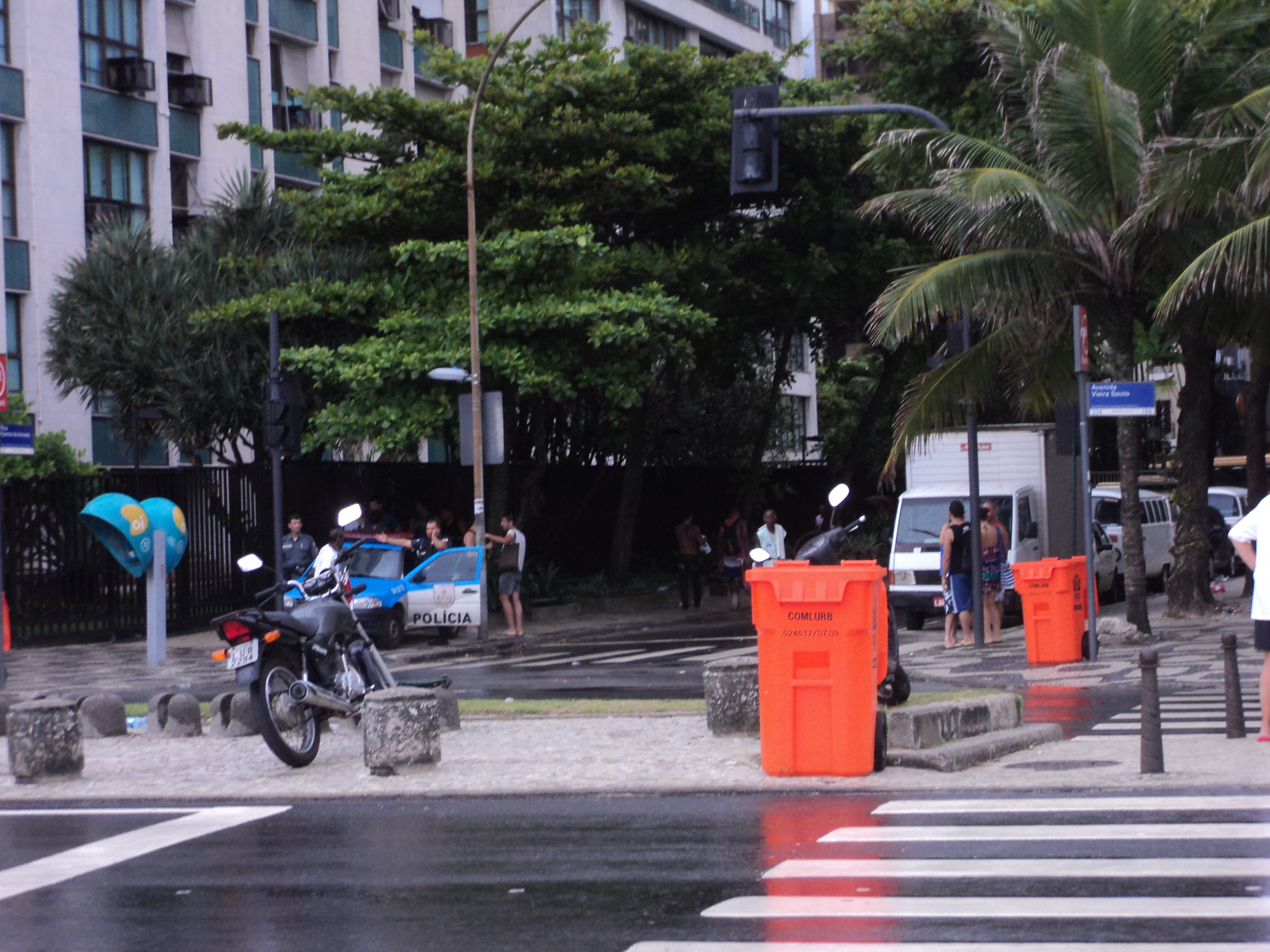
The beginning of the street.

Farme de Amoedo Street (Rua Farme de Amoedo in Portuguese, local Brazilian Portuguese pronunciation: [ˈʁu.ɐ ˈfaʁmi dʒi amuˈedu]) is an important LGBTQ street in the city of Rio de Janeiro, Brazil, that starts at the Vieira Souto Avenue and ends at Alberto de Campos Street. According to the LGBT app Grindr, the gay beach part of Ipanema was elected the best of the world for LGBTs.

== See also ==
- Gay village
- LGBT rights in Brazil
- LGBT rights in the World
