= José Antônio Moreira, Count of Ipanema =

Brazilian industrialist (1797–1879)

José Antônio Moreira
- Count of Ipanema
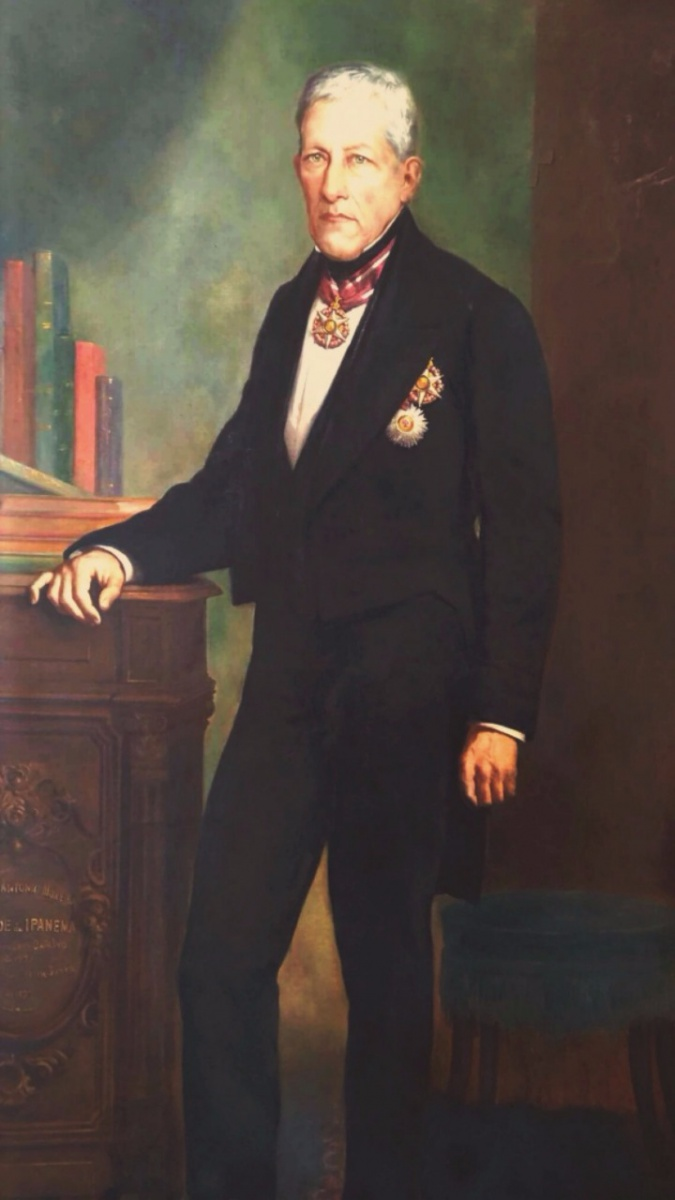

- Coat of arms
- Born: October 23, 1797; São Paulo, Brazil, Kingdom of Portugal and the Algarves
- Died: 28 June 1879 (aged 81); Rio de Janeiro, Brazil
- Spouse: Laurinda Rosa Ferreira dos Santos
- Issue: José Antônio Moreira Filho; João Antônio Moreira; Joaquim José Moreira; Manoel Antônio Moreira; Laurinda Rosa Moreira; Mariana Rosa Moreira; Francisco Antônio Moreira
- Father: José Antônio Moreira
- Mother: Ana Joaquina de Jesus

José Antônio Moreira, first Count of Ipanema, (October 23, 1797 - June 28, 1879) was a Brazilian industrialist of the branch of the metallurgy. His parents were José Antônio Moreira and Ana Joaquina de Jesus. He married Laurinda Rosa dos Santos, leaving descendants, amongst them José Antônio Moreira Filho, the second Baron of Ipanema.

== Titles and honors ==
Commander of the Imperial Order of Christ and dignitary of the Order of the Rose. He was created baron via a decree in 24 of March 1847, baron with greatness via a decree of 25 of September 1849, viscount with greatness via a decree of 2 of December 1854 and count via a decree of 20 of February 1868. His title refers to the Ipanema River in São Paulo, located close to the Royal Ironworks of St John.
