= Arpoador =

Region on the southern zone of the city of Rio de Janeiro, Brazil

Coordinates: 22°59′26″S 43°11′30″W

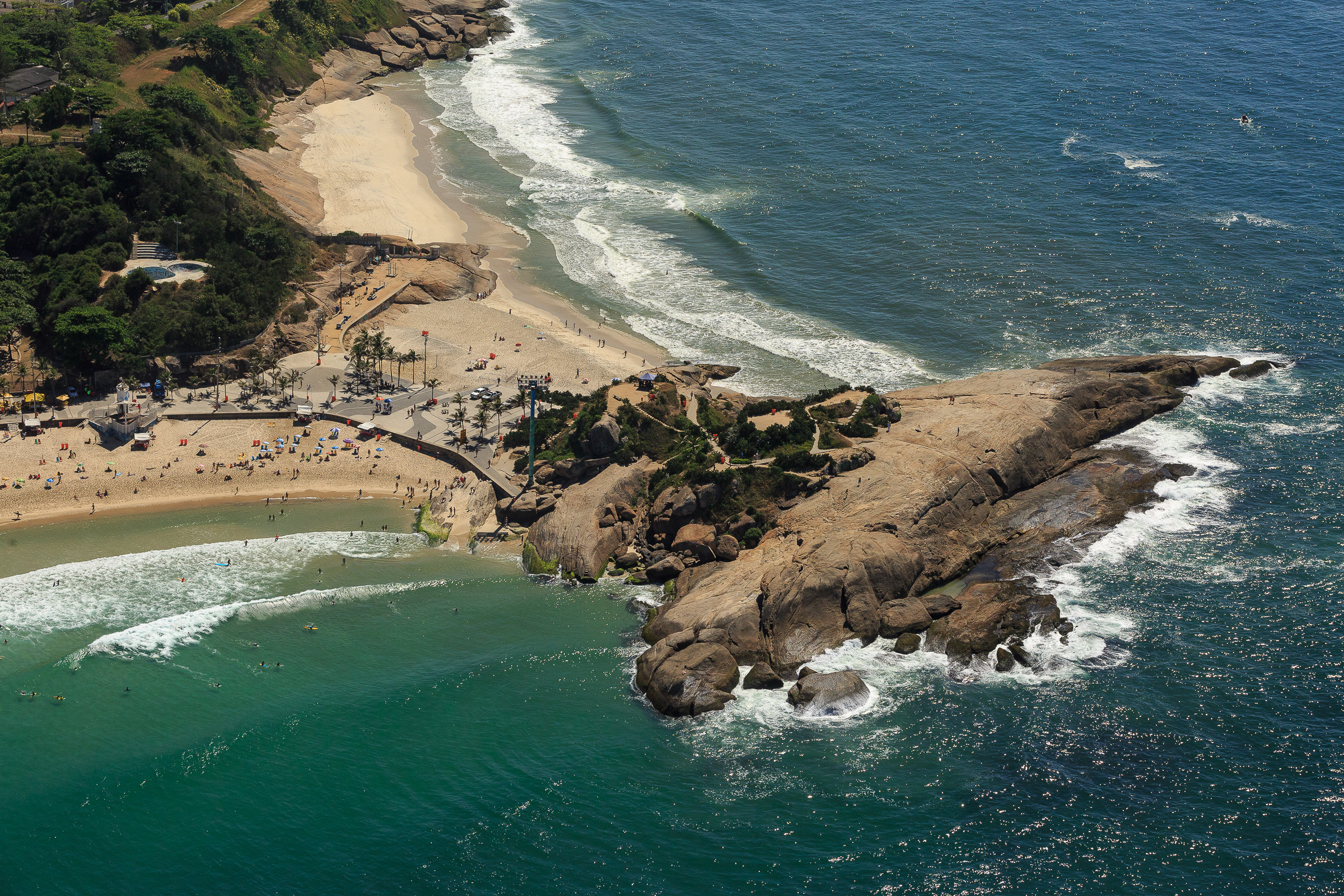
Arpoador rock

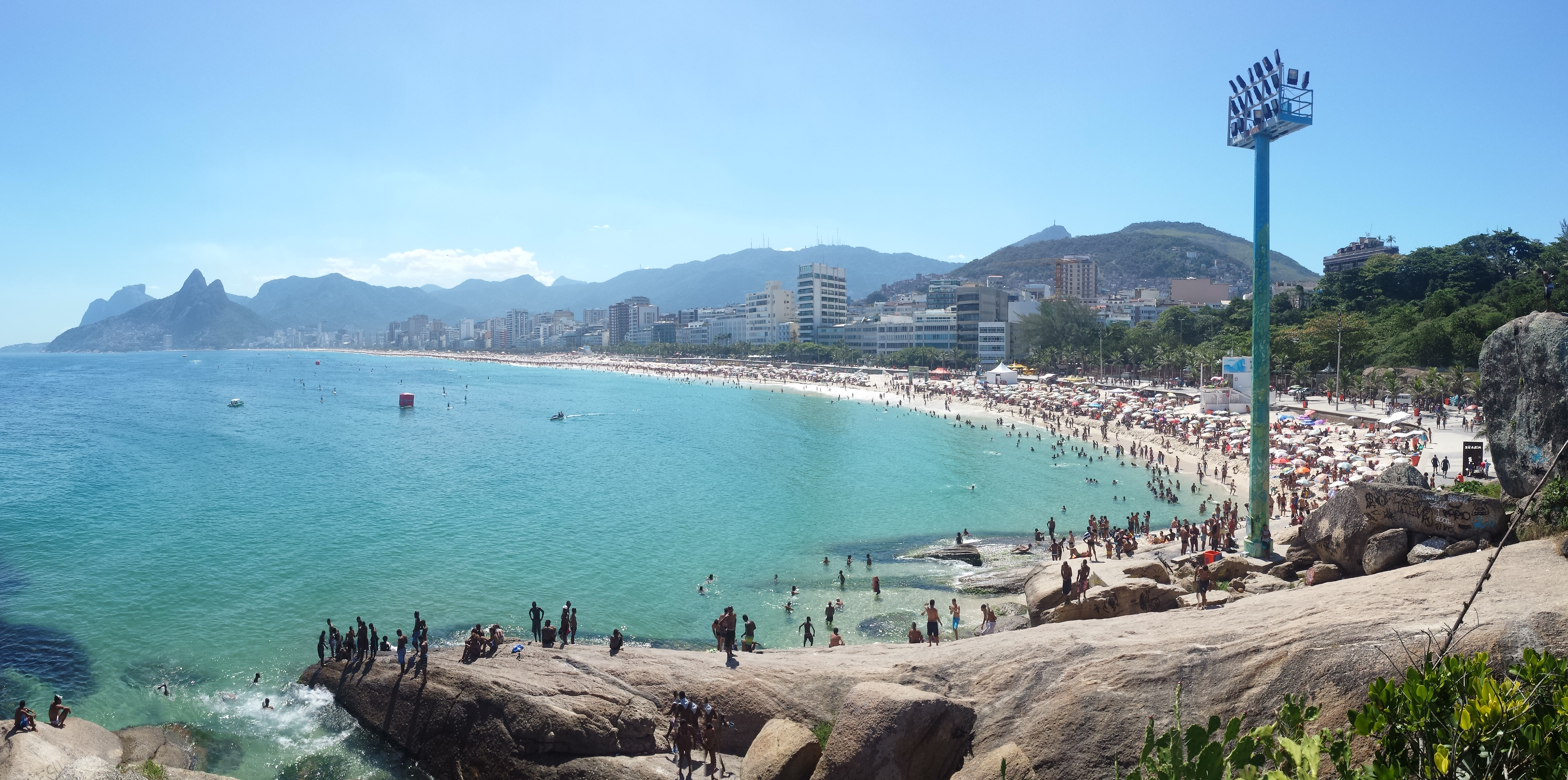
Arpoador beach seen from Arpoador rock

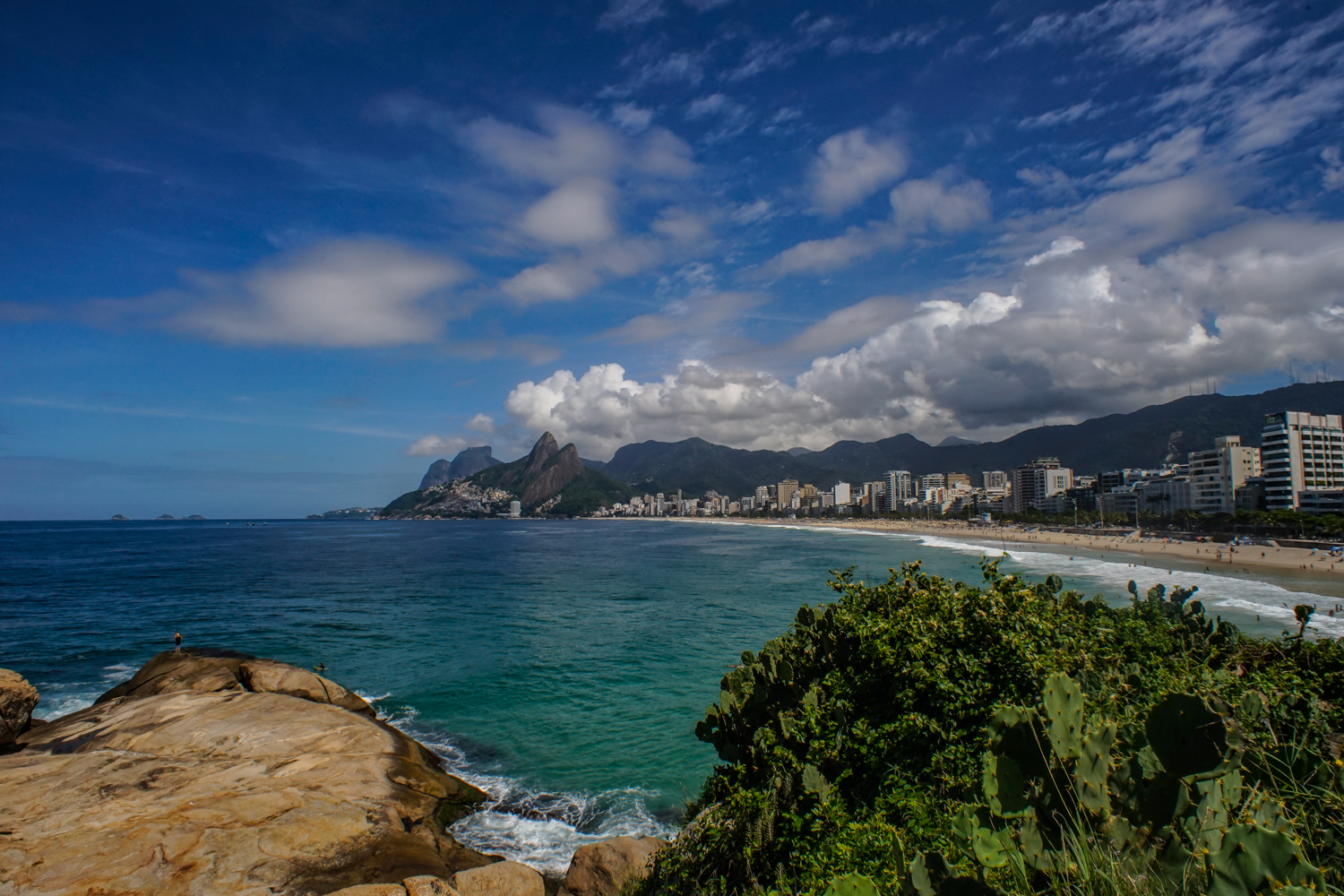
Ipanema seen from Arpoador

Arpoador (literally, the harpoon thrower) is a region located on the southern zone of the city Rio de Janeiro, in a small peninsula between Ipanema and Copacabana. Part of its territory belongs to the neighbourhood of Ipanema, and part to Copacabana.

== Surfing ==
Arpoador is considered one of the best metropolitan surf spots in Rio de Janeiro. The rock outcropping creates stable left breakers up to 7–10 feet high.

Given its metropolitan location, crowds are ferocious and competitive. Given the fact that waves start to break against the rock on a good day, and that a strong rip tide along the promontory creates a quick re-entry, the take-off point is very small.

== Sunset ==
During some time around midsummer it is possible to see the Sun setting over the sea from Arpoador, a rare event on the generally eastward-facing Brazilian coast. On these occasions crowds gather around the place and cheer when the Sun disappears.

== Walking ==
Arpoador is a very popular place for tourists and locals to walk. Arpoador lies at the end of a 4km walk from Leblon, with a number of cafes located there to allow people to stop to look at the sea or enjoy the sun. The rock itself is open to the public, with a number of walkways in place to make it easier to scale the rocks.
