= Rua Oscar Freire =

Avenue in São Paulo

Oscar Freire Street
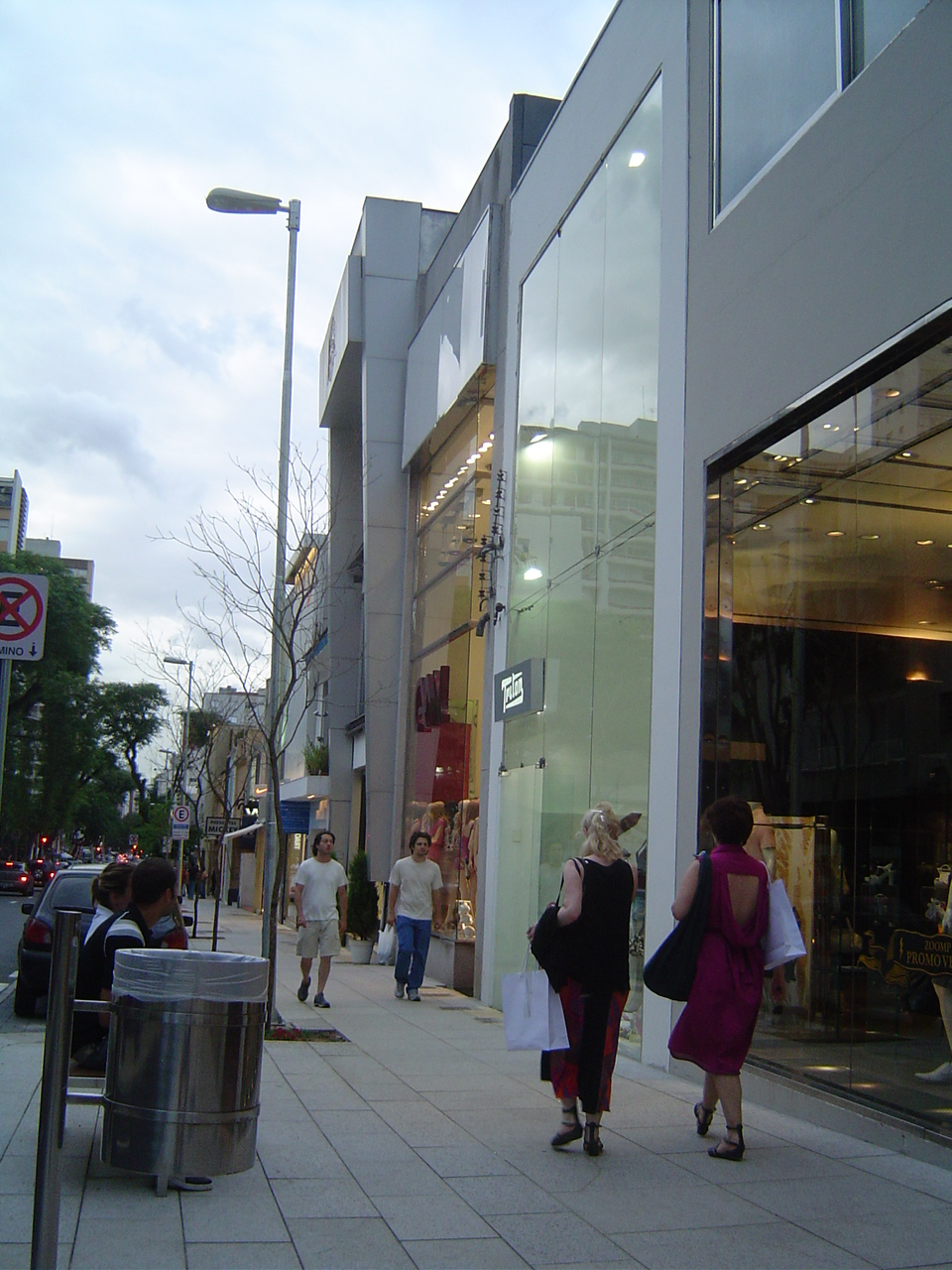
- Stores in the Rua Oscar Freire
- Interactive map of Oscar Freire Street
- Native name: Rua Oscar Freire (Portuguese)
- Former names: Rua São José (São José Street) and Rua Iguape (Iguape Street)
- Length: 2.6 km (1.6 mi)
- Location: São Paulo, Brazil
- Coordinates: 23°33′32″S 46°40′23″W
- South end: Alameda Casa Branca, 1009
- North end: Avenida Doutor Arnaldo, 1566

Construction
- Inauguration: 1970

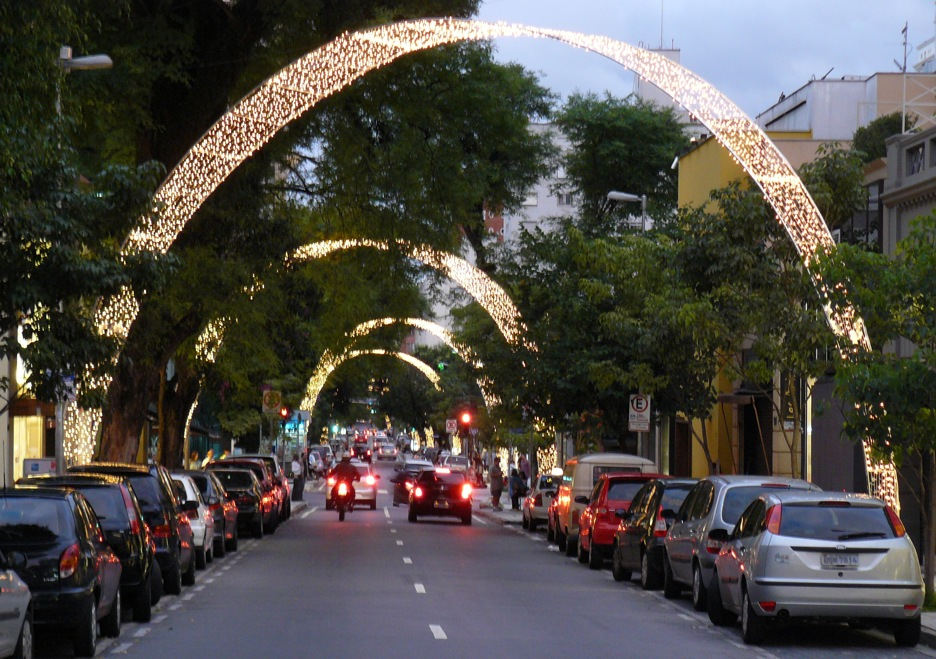
Rua Oscar Freire, São Paulo

Rua Oscar Freire, i.e. Oscar Freire Street, is a tree-lined street stretching from Alameda Casa Branca to Avenida Doutor Arnaldo in the Jardins district of São Paulo. It crosses the other famous Rua Augusta.

Named after Oscar Freire de Carvalho, it is known for having a large number of stores selling luxury goods.

== History ==
It was named after Oscar Freire de Carvalho, a physician and forensic medicine professor from Bahia, who helped develop the city's first morgue (Instituto Médico Legal).

According to Excellence Mystery Shopping International, Rua Oscar Freire is the 8th most luxurious street in the world and second in the Americas behind 5th Avenue in New York. It was named the 8th most luxurious street for the second time in 2008.

== Stores and economy ==
Shops located on Rua Oscar Freire and surrounding streets have included Louis Vuitton, Armani (Giorgio Armani and Emporio Armani lines), Carmen Steffens, Montblanc, Cartier, MaxMara, Ermenegildo Zegna, Versace, Diesel, Cavalli, Bulgari, Salvatore Ferragamo, Marc Jacobs, Gant, Lacoste, Timberland, Tommy Hilfiger, Nike, Adidas, Benetton. Brazilian fashion has included designers and brands such as Alexandre Herchcovitch, Cris Barros, Reinaldo Lourenço, Glória Coelho, Animale, Forum, Ellus, NK Store, Sergio K, Havaianas, Carlos Miele, Cavalera, Le Lis Blanc, Canal, Triton, Iódice and Osklen. National jewelry stores include Vivara and H Stern. In 2008, among stores were Dior.

Food shops and restaurants can also be found. Among them are A Figueira Rubaiyat, Fasano, Antiquarius and 'Gero, four of the city's most traditional and expensive restaurants, as well as Ben & Jerry's. There is a Nespresso store, and in 2010 a Valrhona boutique was opened.

In 2006, stores along the street funded a project to remove unsightly electrical poles and install underground fiber-optic lines instead, in an attempt to make the street more appealing to shoppers.

The main Highrise will be a 53 Storey of Vitacon, as many old shops and constructions of street is given place for Residential Buildings.

== Transportation ==
A new Line 4 - Yellow Metro station was constructed on this street and opened in 2017.

== See also ==
- List of shopping streets and districts by city
- List of most expensive streets by city
