= Banda de Ipanema =

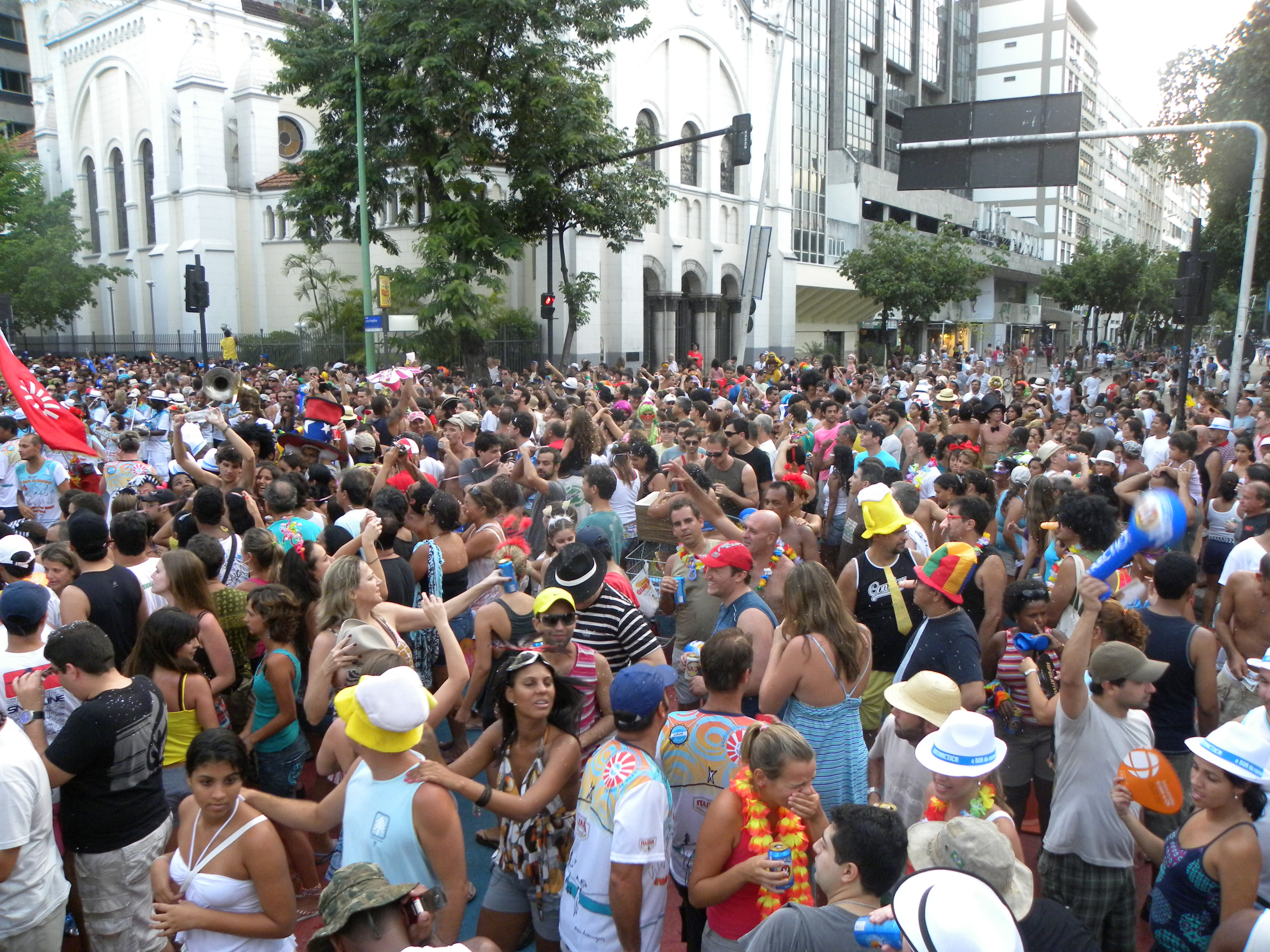
- Banda de Ipanema at Rua Visconde de Pirajá
- Foundation: 13 February 1965; 61 years ago
- Colors
- Location: Ipanema, Rio de Janeiro

Website
- https://ipanema.com/carnival/banda.htm

Banda de Ipanema is one of the largest Carnival blocks of Rio de Janeiro's street Carnival festivities. The first parade happened in 1965, when Brazil was under a military dictatorship. In 2004 it was declared part of the city's cultural heritage. The first parade happens on Saturday two weeks before Carnival, and they march again on Carnival Saturday and Carnival Tuesday (Mardi-Gras). The event attracts as many as 20 thousand people to the streets of Ipanema.

== History of Banda de Ipanema ==
The format of the band was inspired by the Philarmonica Embocadura, a Carnival street band in the city of Uba, in the neighboring state of Minas Gerais. Designer Ferdy Carneiro rented a bus in 1959 to take some of his carioca friends to spend Carnival in his hometown. The event was headed by the presidents of the band, dressed in white suits and hats while pretending to play musical instruments. The actual band was in the back, and the whole town followed along.

The idea lingered on, and a few years later Ferdy, Albino and Claudio Pinheiro, Jaguar, Ziraldo and Zelio, Hugo Bidet, Roniquito Chevalier and other personalities organized the first parade. They hired the band of the Navy School, gathered to warm up at Bar Jangadeiros, around Praca General Osorio, and started marching on the streets with just a few dozen friends - the founders dressed up as "presidents". When they reached the next pit stop, Bar Velloso (later renamed Garota de Ipanema), there were already something like 500 people! Ipanema residents loved the idea, climbed down from their apartments and simply joined in.

One of the most memorable individuals to play the role of the godmother was actress Leila Diniz. Notably, Diniz was the first pregnant woman to display her belly in a bikini at Ipanema Beach. After Albino Pinheiro died, his brother, Claudio, took over the task of organizing the parades.

== Modern Banda de Ipanema ==
Drag queens in costume also take part in the parade, interacting with spectators and posing for photographs. They were not part of the Banda in its early years and began to appear later.

Banda de Ipanema was declared part of the cultural heritage of Rio de Janeiro on January 23, 2004 by the Instituto Brasileiro de Patrimonio Cultural, in a recognition of the important role it played in the rebirth of Rio Carnival Street Festivities . To give you an idea of the proportions, in 2009 there were about 400 street bands registered officially. The largest one, Monobloco, reportedly gathered 400 thousand revelers on Sunday the week after Carnival along Av. Rio Branco, in the Downtown area.

Like all other street Carnival festivities in Rio, the event is free - you do not have to pay to join the fun. The gathering spot is at Praca General Osorio around 4 p.m., and the band starts marching around 5:30 p.m. The repertoire includes old-time marchinhas including some that date back to the days of Carmen Miranda. These are familiar songs that all Cariocas can sing along to. In the latest years there's also the Bandinha de Ipanema, that is specifically aimed at the children, and happens within the confines of Praca General Osorio.

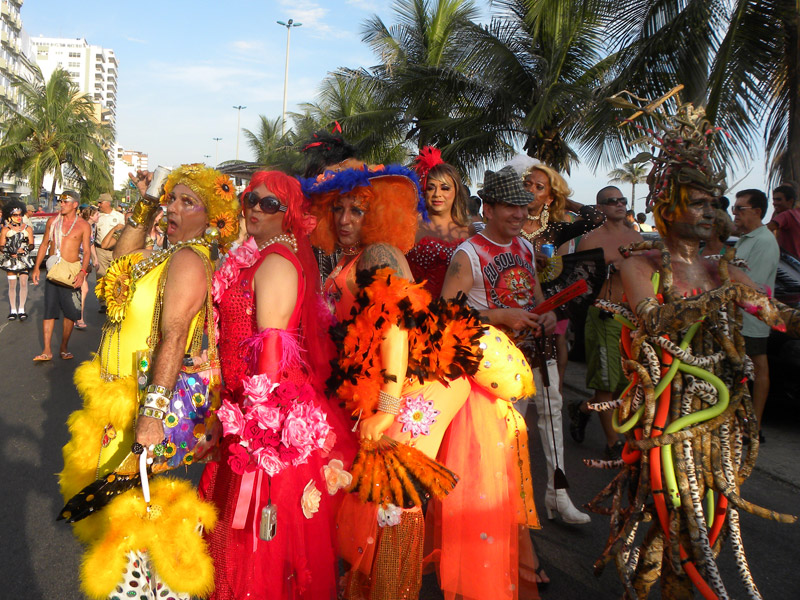
Banda de Ipanema

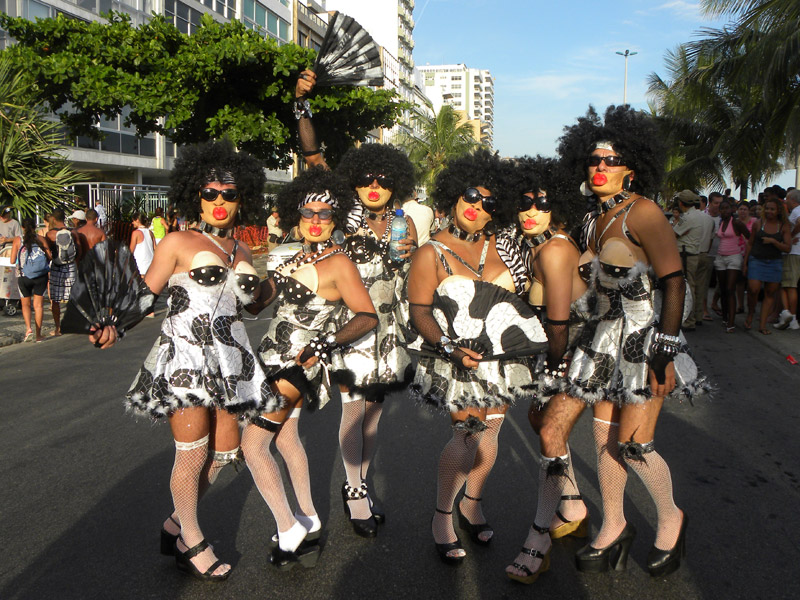
Banda de Ipanema

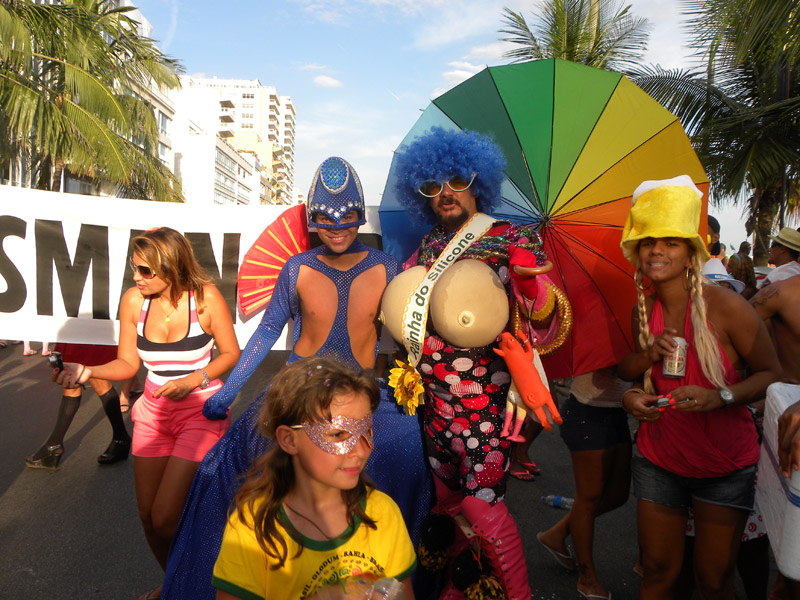
Banda de Ipanema

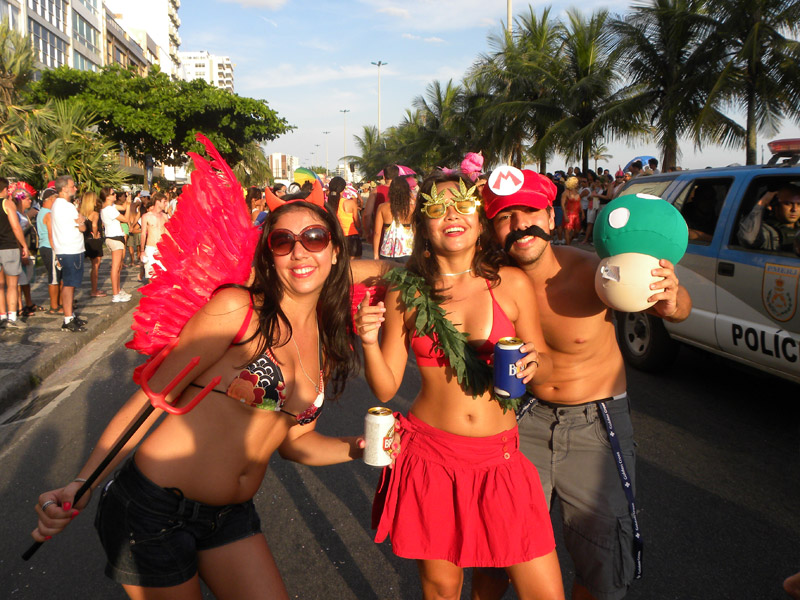
Banda de Ipanema

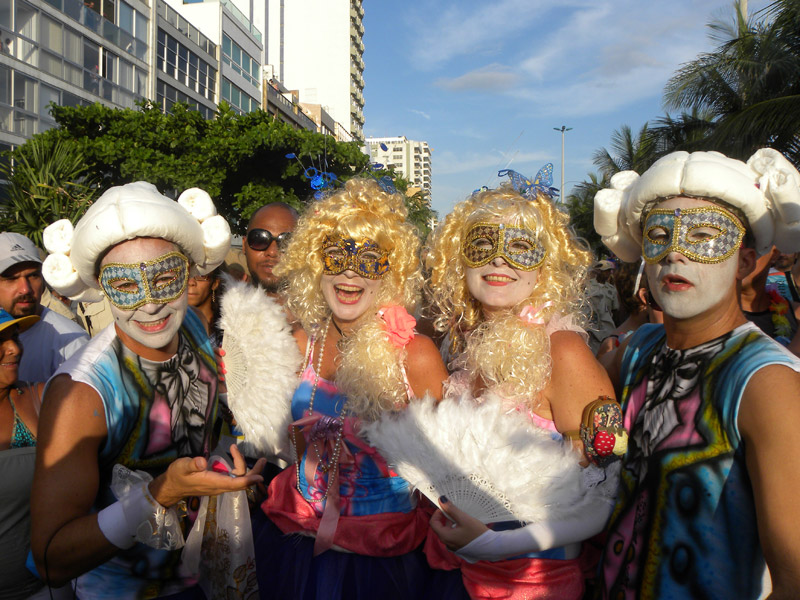
Banda de Ipanema

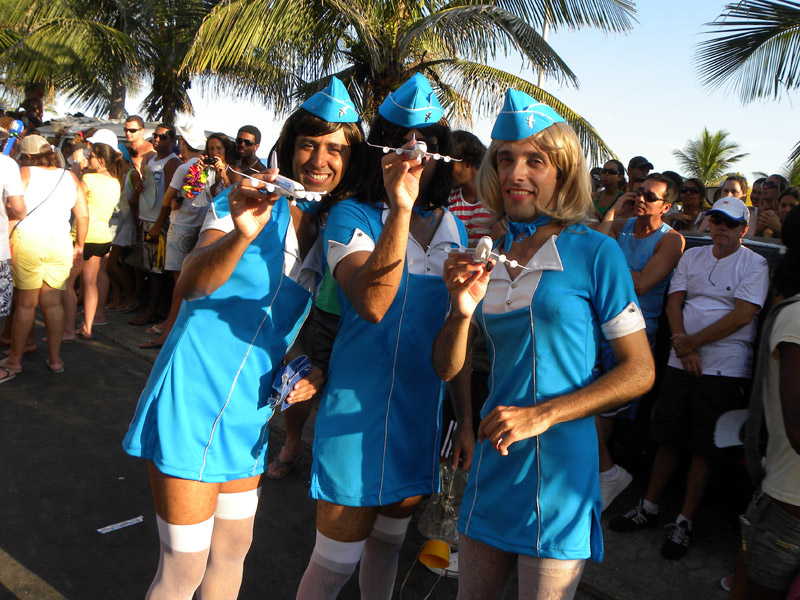
Banda de Ipanema
