= José Antônio Moreira Filho, 2nd Baron of Ipanema =

José Antônio Moreira Filho
- 2nd Baron of Ipanema
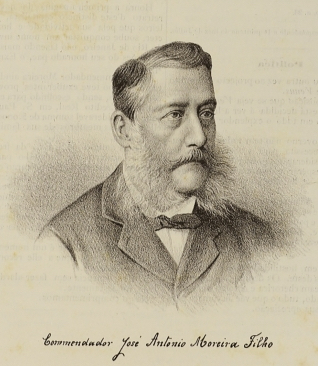
- Born: 29 August 1830; Iperó, Empire of Brazil
- Died: 27 January 1899 (aged 68); Rio de Janeiro, Rio de Janeiro, Brazil
- Coat of Arms of the Baron of Ipanema

José Antônio Moreira Filho, the second baron with grandee of Ipanema (27 August 1830 — 27 February 1899), was a Brazilian nobleman and businessman in real estate.

He was the son of José Antônio Moreira, the first count of Ipanema, and of Laurinda Rosa Ferreira dos Santos. He married Luísa Rudge. They left many descendants.

He was made Commander of the Portuguese Military Order of Christ and of the Order of Our Lady of the Conception of Vila Vicosa. He received his baronage by decree on 13 May 1885, and the grandeeship by decree on 5 September 1888. His title referenced the Ipanema River, on whose banks his father had helped build the Ipanema Ironworks, in Sorocaba. Subsequently, Moreira settled down in the city of Rio de Janeiro, where he was a leader in the urbanization of the neighbourhood of Ipanema, then a separate town.
