= Qianmen Subdistrict =

Qianmen Subdistrict 前门街道
- Subdistrict
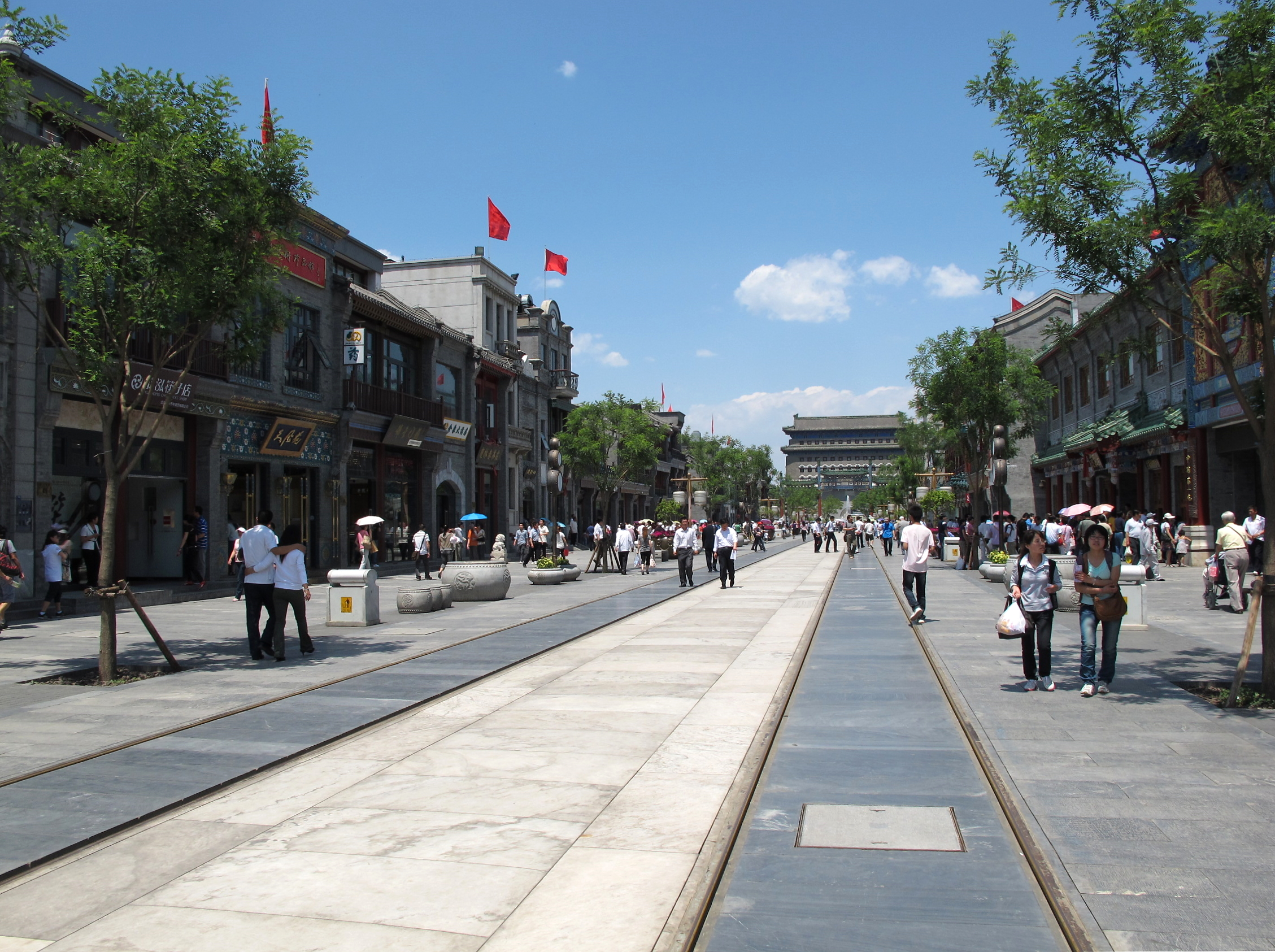
- Qianmen Subdistrict, 2010

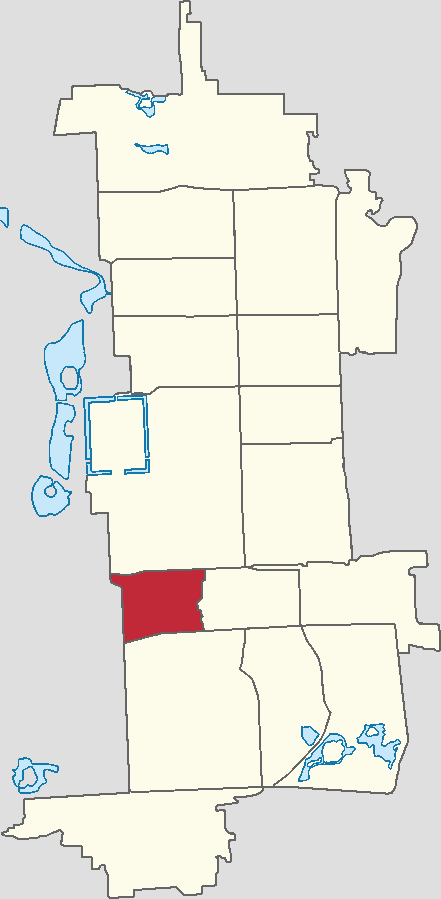
- Location of Qianmen Subdistrict within Dongcheng District

- Location within Beijing Location within China
- Coordinates: 39°53′58″N 116°24′31″E
- Country: China
- Municipality: Beijing
- District: Dongcheng

Area
  - Total: 1.1 km^{2} (0.42 sq mi)

Population (2020)
  - Total: 9,081
  - Density: 8,300/km^{2} (21,000/sq mi)
- Time zone: UTC+8 (China Standard)
- Postal code: 100005
- Area code: 010

Qianmen Subdistrict (Chinese: 前门街道; pinyin: qiánmén jiēdào) is a subdistrict in the western portion of Dongcheng District, Beijing, China. In 2020, there are 9,081 permanent residents in this subdistrict.

The subdistrict was named after the Zhengyangmen, a gate which used to be part of the Beijing city wall, and is colloquially known as "Qianmen" (Chinese: 前门; lit. 'Front Gate') to the locals.

== History ==
Timeline of changes in status of Qianmen Subdistrict
| Year | Status |
|---|---|
| 1912 | Part of the 8th District |
| 1949 | Part of Qianmen District |
| 1954 | Divided into 4 subdistricts: Damochang; Xihuying; Lucaoyuan; Caochang Batiao |
| 1958 | Merged into Qianmen Subdistrict. Transferred under Chongwen District |
| 2010 | Transferred under Dongcheng District |

== Administration Division ==
In the year 2021, Qianmen Subdistrict contains 3 communities. They are listed as follows:

| Administrative Division Codes | Community Name in English | Community Name in Simplified Chinese |
|---|---|---|
| 110101011001 | Qianmendongdajie | 前门东大街 |
| 110101011006 | Dajiang | 大江 |
| 110101011010 | Caochang | 草厂 |

== Landmarks ==
- Zhengyangmen
