= Ipanema talpa =

Scientific classification
- Domain: Eukaryota
- Kingdom: Animalia
- Phylum: Arthropoda
- Class: Malacostraca
- Order: Amphipoda
- Family: Ipanemidae; Barnard & Thomas, 1988
- Genus: Ipanema; Barnard & Thomas, 1988
- Species: I. talpa

Binomial name
- Ipanema talpa Barnard & Thomas, 1988

Genus of crustaceans

Ipanema is a monotypic genus of crustaceans belonging to the monotypic family Ipanemidae. The only species is Ipanema talpa.

The species is found in Southern America.
