= Avenida Vieira Souto =

Largely residential street in Rio de Janeiro

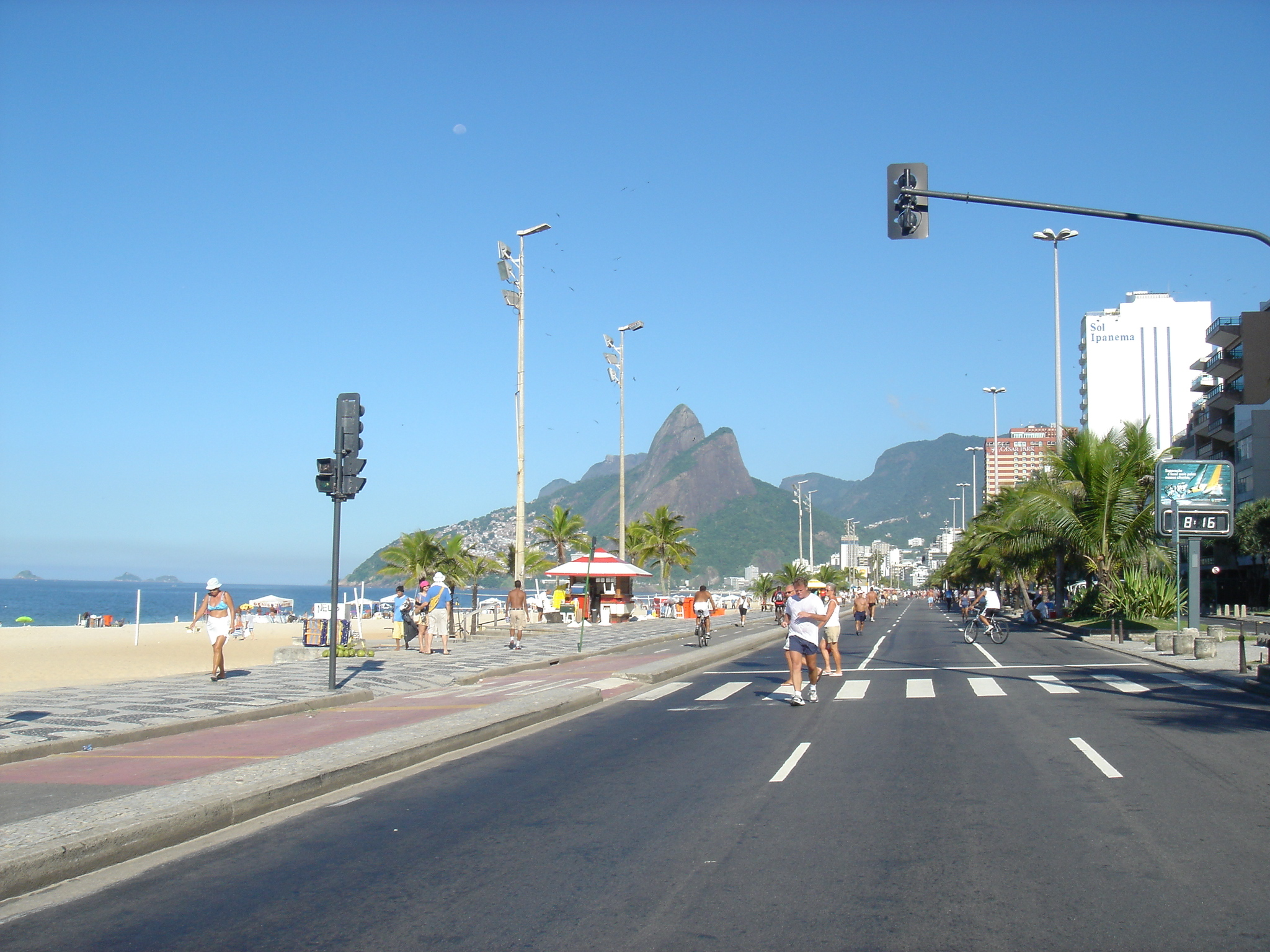
Avenida Vieira Souto on Sunday, when cars are disallowed to enter it.

Avenida Vieira Souto is a largely residential street in Rio de Janeiro. The street passes along the beach through the neighborhood of Ipanema. On its west end, after crossing Avenida Epitácio Pessoa, the street continues straight and uninterrupted into the adjacent neighborhood of Leblon, where the street takes a different name, Avenida Delfim Moreira. On its east end, the street turns to continue into the neighborhood of Copacabana, where it takes the name Rua Francisco Otaviano. Some of Rio de Janeiro's most expensive residences are found on Avenida Vieira Souto. On Sundays, the half of the street near to the beach is closed to allow people to walk and ride bicycles.

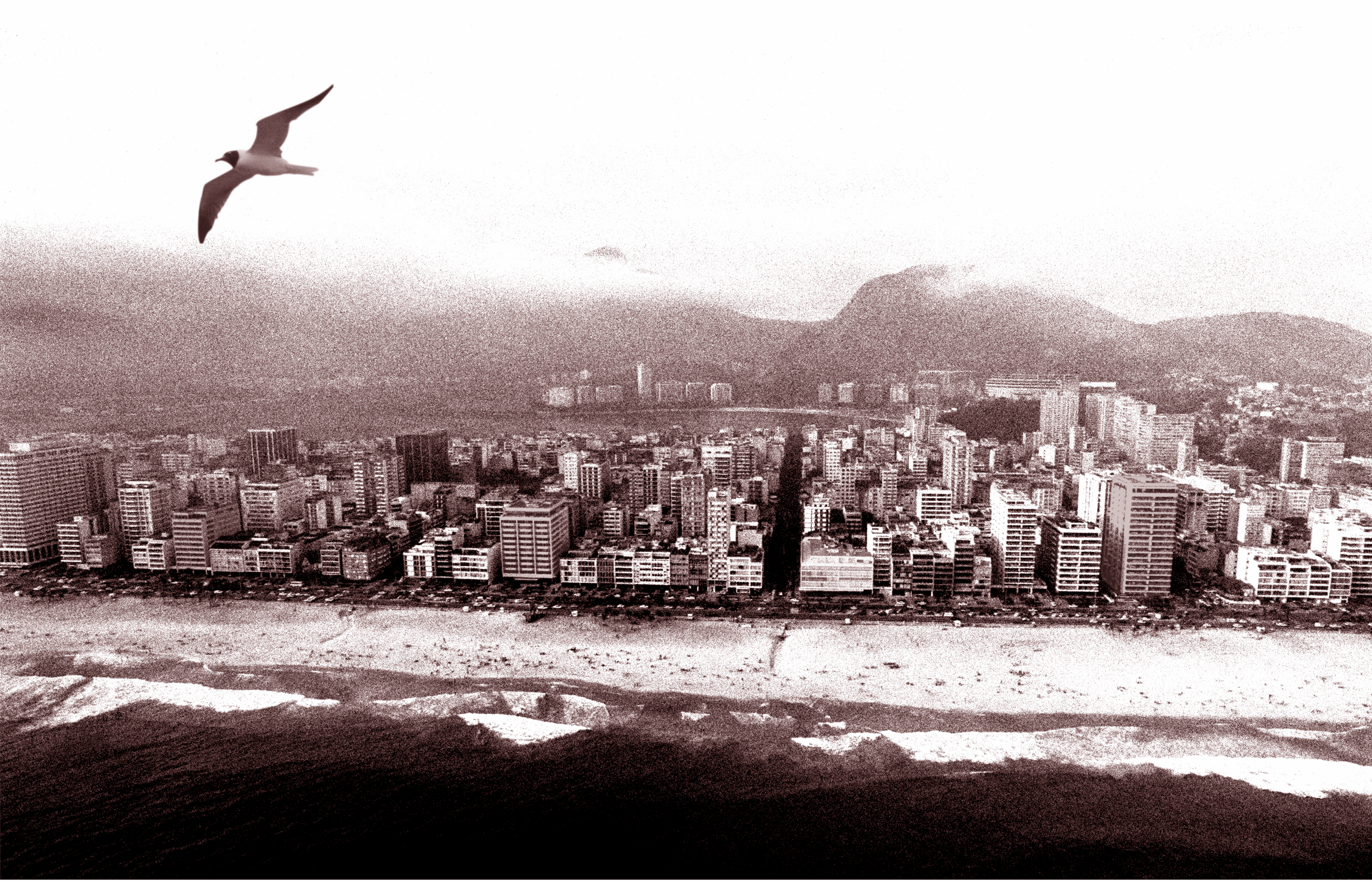
Avenida Vieira Souto, 1985
