= Beyond Ipanema =

- Film poster
- Directed by: Guto Barra
- Produced by: Guto Barra; Béco Dranoff
- Cinematography: Artur Ratton Kummer
- Edited by: Guto Barra
- Release date: 11 October 2009 (Chicago)
- Running time: 90 minutes
- Country: United States
- Language: English

Beyond Ipanema: Brazilian Waves in Global Music is a 2009 documentary film about the influence of Brazilian music outside of the country, especially the USA. Produced by filmmakers Guto Barra and Béco Dranoff, it features interviews and performances by David Byrne, Devendra Banhart, M.I.A., Os Mutantes, Caetano Veloso, Gilberto Gil, Tom Zé, Seu Jorge, Thievery Corporation, Bebel Gilberto, CSS, Creed Taylor and many others.

The film's World Premiere was at New York's Museum of Modern Art in July 2009. It was since shown in over 50 film festivals, including HotDocs (the largest documentary film festival in North America), South By Southwest (one of the largest music festivals in the United States) and the Chicago International Film Festival (one of North America's oldest film events). It has also screened in venues such as the Institute of Contemporary Art, in Boston, Yerba Buena Center for the Arts, in San Francisco, The High Art Museum, in Atlanta, and Haus der Kulturen der Welt, in Berlin.

Beyond Ipanema was awarded Best Documentary and Best Sound Editing at the 14th Brazilian Film Festival of Miami and Best Film at the 3rd Brazilian Film Festival of Vancouver. According to The Hollywood Reporter, "Beyond Ipanema is a Vibrant and stylish look at decades of Brazilian music focuses on the reception it has received in the U.S." To The Huffington Post, "Beyond Ipanema is a brilliant overview of the incursion of Brazilian music world wide by directors Guto Barra and Béco Dranoff."
