= Ipanema =

- Neighbourhood
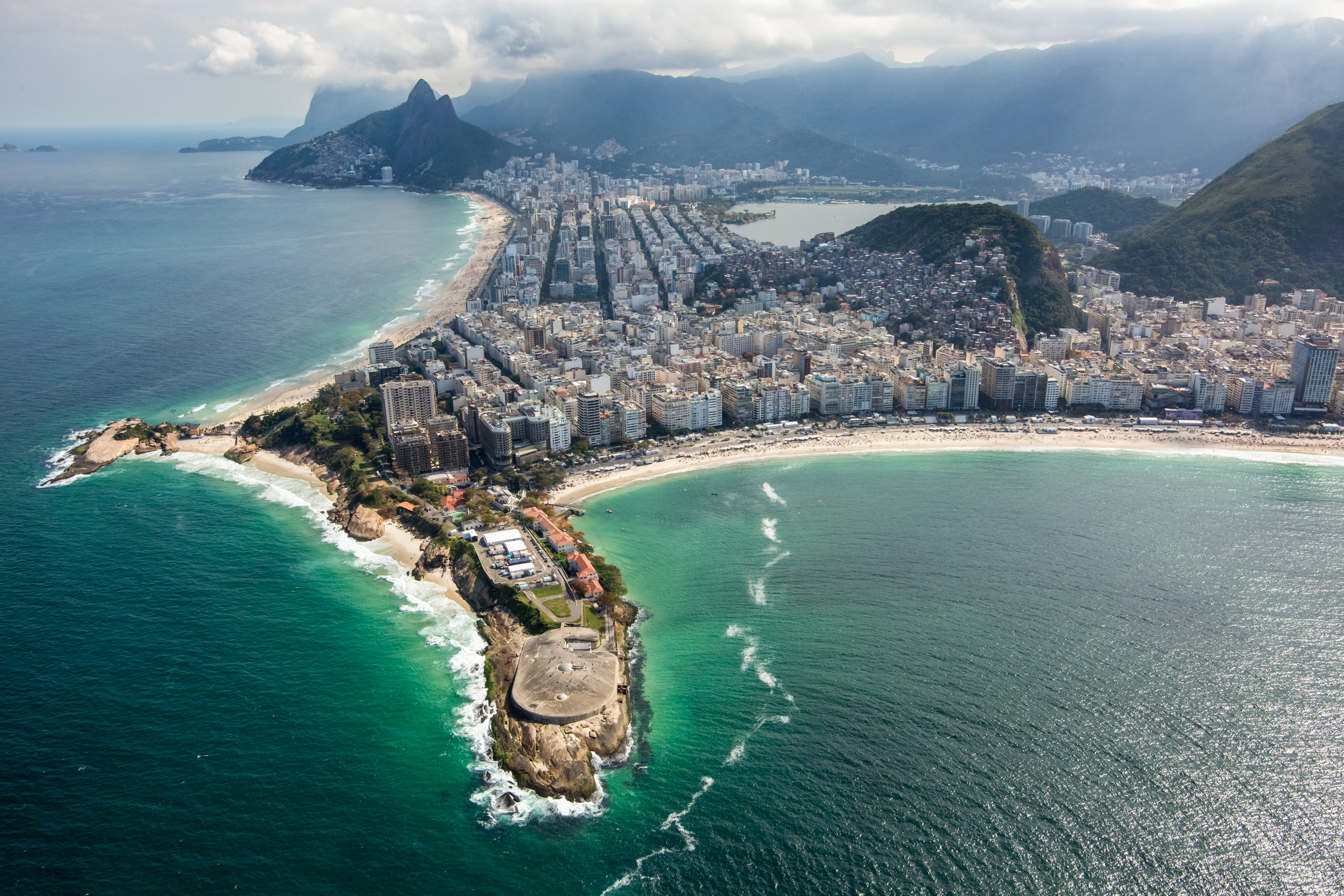

- Location in Rio de Janeiro Ipanema (Brazil)
- Coordinates: 22°59′01″S 43°12′16″W
- Country: Brazil
- State: Rio de Janeiro
- Municipality: Rio de Janeiro
- Zone: South Zone

Population (2010)
  - Total: 42,743

Ipanema (Portuguese pronunciation: [ipaˈnẽmɐ]) is a neighbourhood located in the South Zone of the city of Rio de Janeiro, Brazil, between Leblon and Arpoador. The beach at Ipanema became known internationally with the popularity of the bossa nova song, "The Girl from Ipanema" ("Garota de Ipanema"), written by Antônio Carlos Jobim and Vinícius de Moraes. It borders the neighborhoods of Copacabana, Leblon, and Lagoa.

== Etymology ==
The name Ipanema originally referred to a river in the state of São Paulo, its etymology deriving from the Tupi language words ipá (pond) and nem-a (stinking). Possible translations for its original meaning are "worthless water", "stinking lake", "turbid water", or "water worthless for human consumption". The historian Teodoro Sampaio translated Ipanema as "bad water".

The neighbourhood in Rio de Janeiro was named after José Antônio Moreira Filho, 2nd Baron of Ipanema, who in 1883 created the first urban settlement in the region.

The border area between Copacabana and Ipanema is known locally as "Copanema" featuring the scenic Pedra do Arpoador.

== History ==
Ipanema today consists mostly of land that once belonged to José Antônio Moreira Filho, Baron of Ipanema. The name "Ipanema" did not originally refer to the beach, but to the homeland of the baron at São Paulo.

Mosaic sidewalk in Ipanema

== Character ==
Mosaic sidewalk, 2026

Ipanema is adjacent to Copacabana and Leblon beaches, but it is distinct from its neighbours. It is relatively easy to navigate because the streets are aligned in a grid. Ipanema's beach culture includes surfers and sunbathers who gather daily at the beach. Every Sunday, the roadway closest to the beach is closed to motor vehicles, allowing local residents and tourists to ride bikes, roller skate, skateboard, and walk along the ocean.

Running along the beach are stunning mosaic sidewalks, designed by Roberto Burle Marx. Ipanema is one of Rio's most expensive districts to live in; private investment has led to the building of world-class restaurants, shops, and cafés.Ipanema has played a cultural role in Rio de Janeiro since the city's beginning, with its own universities, art galleries, and theatres. It holds a street parade, the Banda de Ipanema, during Carnival festivities separate from those of Rio de Janeiro, attracting up to 50,000 people to the streets of Ipanema.

== Beach ==
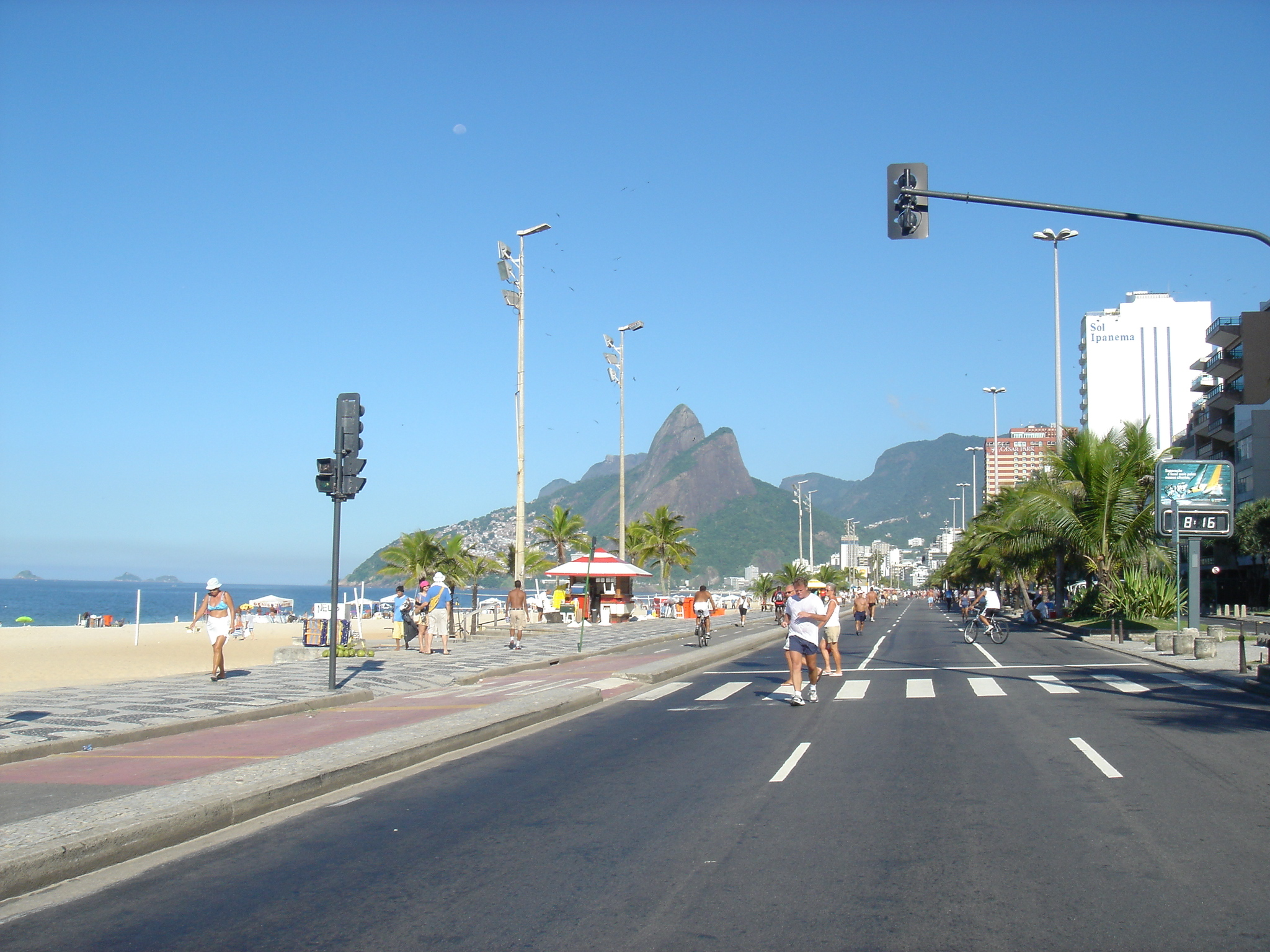
Vieira Souto avenue

The beach at Ipanema is known for its elegant development and its social life. Two mountains called the Dois Irmãos (Two Brothers) rise at the western end of the beach, which is divided into segments delineated by postos, or lifeguard towers. Beer is sold everywhere, along with the traditional cachaça. There are always circles of people playing football, volleyball, and footvolley, a locally invented sport that is a combination of volleyball and football.

In the winter, the surf can reach three metres (nine feet). The water quality varies from clear light-blue water to a more murky green after heavy rains. Constant swells help keep the water clean, and the often treacherous beach break regularly forms surfable barrels. Just west of this colourful section, towards Leblon, Rio de Janeiro, is another popular stretch of sand known as Posto 10, referring to the #10 lifeguard station.

The beach is one of many areas that suffer from the city's poor waste treatment. In its waters, "fecal coliform bacteria sometimes spike at 16 times the Brazilian government's 'satisfactory' level." Large amounts of pollutants are still dumped into the sea through the nearby marine outfall pipe, a matter of increasing concern to ecologists.

Beachgoers often applaud the sunset in the summer. In 2008, the Travel Channel listed Ipanema Beach as the sexiest beach in the world.

== Posto 9 ==
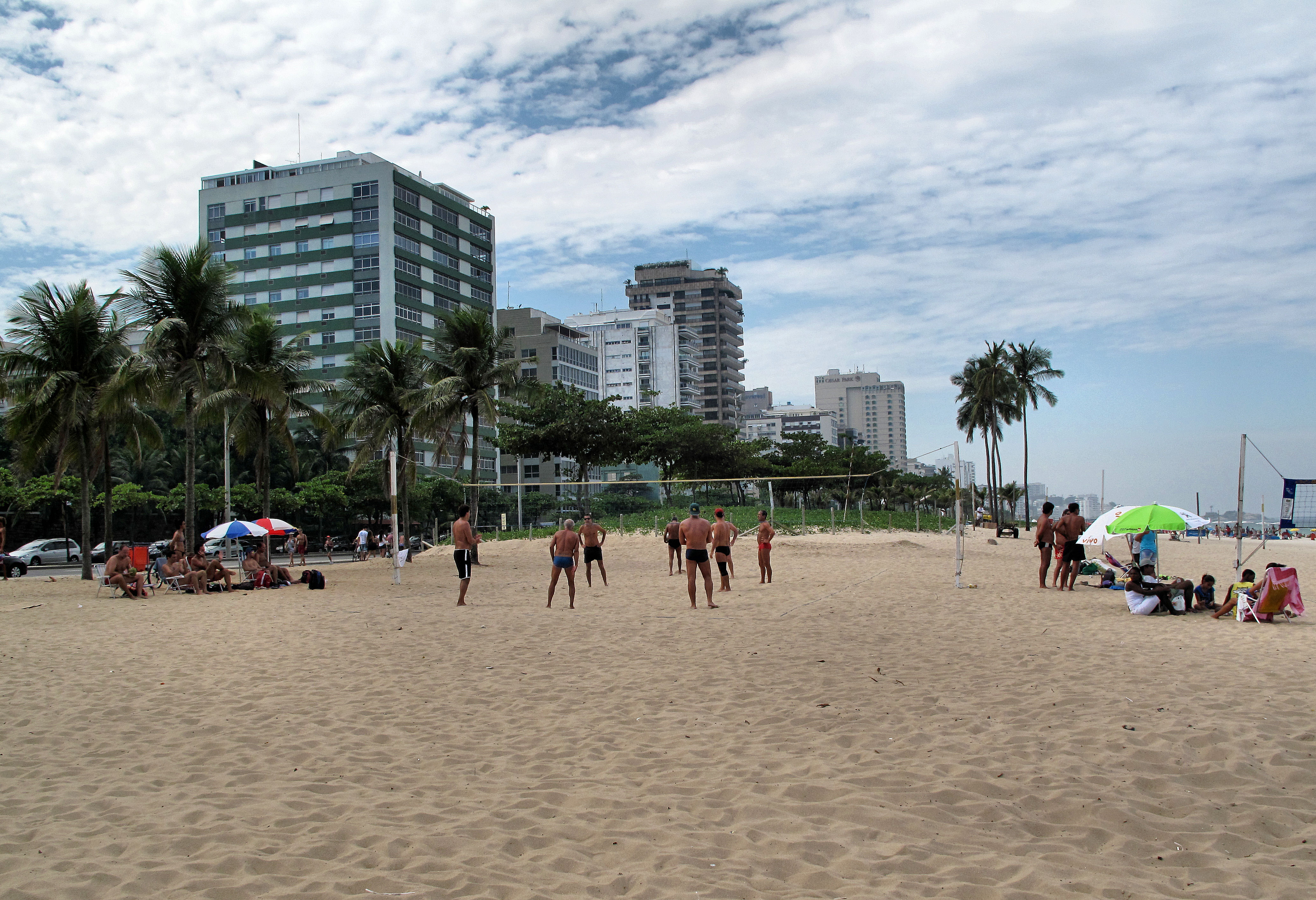
Volleyball players in Ipanema.

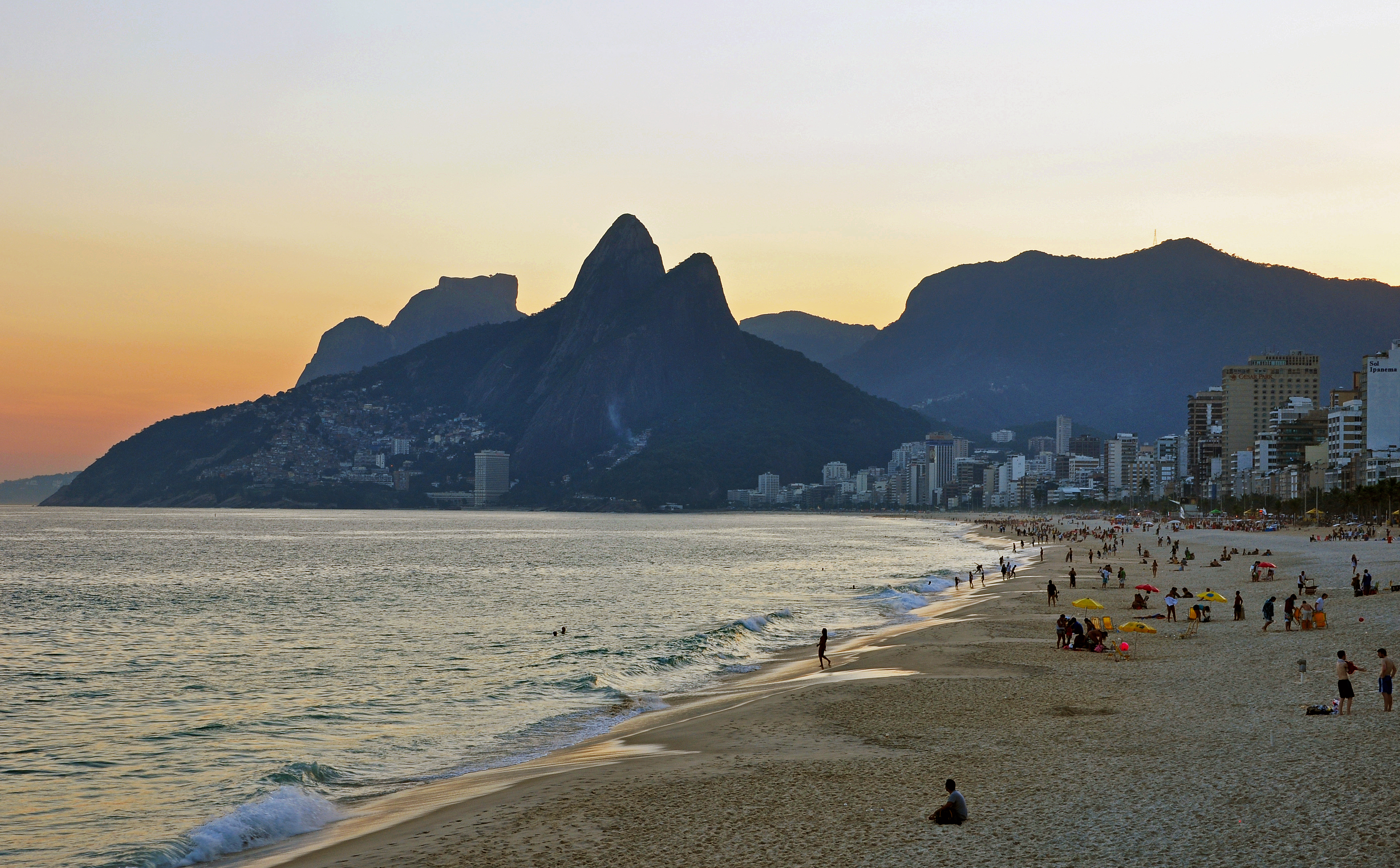
Sunset at Ipanema, with Pedra da Gávea mountain, Dois Irmãos mountain and the neighbourhood of Vidigal in the background

Posto 9 is the section of the beach around the #9 lifeguard station, across from Joana Angelica Street. Its notoriety began around 1979 when Fernando Gabeira, later a federal deputy for the State of Rio de Janeiro, returned from political exile in France and was photographed there in a thong. He had been a member of the leftist urban guerrilla group MR8, which kidnapped the American ambassador, Charles Burke Elbrick, in 1969 and demanded the release of fifteen political prisoners in exchange for his life.

Gabeira became a political celebrity with the publication of a memoir about his experiences as a guerrilla and his years in exile. In 1979, he was photographed wearing a skimpy purple swimsuit at Ipanema, and gave an interview to a gay and lesbian newspaper, inciting rumours that he was gay, which he neither confirmed nor denied. His going to the beach at Posto 9 made it famous throughout the country.

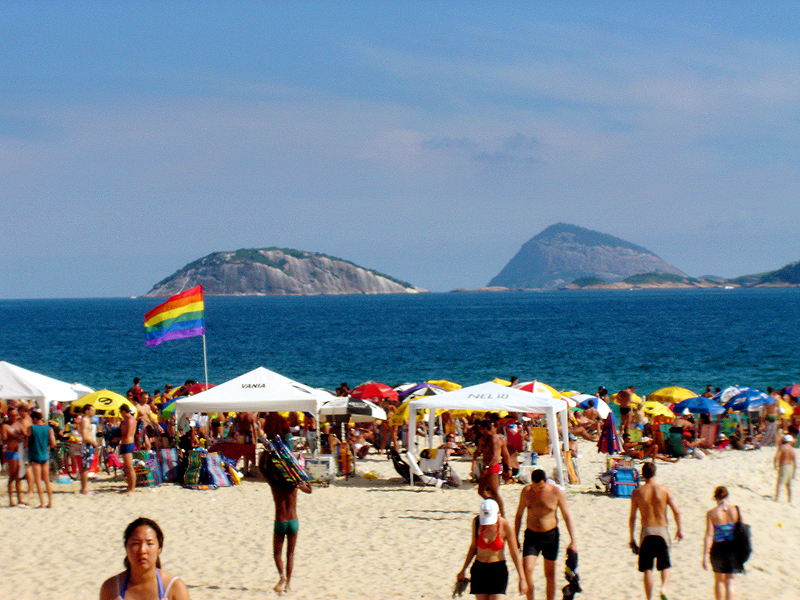
LGBTQ Pride flag in Ipanema

Posto 9 inherited its status as a gathering spot for counter-cultural types from the area near Farme de Amoedo Street, next to the dunes called Dunas do Barato and a pier that was demolished in the 1970s. It has a long history of public cannabis smoking (illegal in Brazil), police raids, and gatherings of left-wing intellectuals. It is still popular with students, artists, actors, and liberal-minded people.

== Feira Hippie de Ipanema ==
A group of hippies started a Sunday market in Ipanema in 1968, and the traditional fair continues with over 700 stalls set up at the Feira Hippie de Ipanema (Ipanema Hippie Market).

Feira Hippie in Ipanema

== Cultural references ==
Ipanema gained fame with the rise of the popular bossa nova sound, when residents Antônio Carlos Jobim and Vinicius de Moraes created their ode to the neighbourhood, "The Girl from Ipanema". The song was written in 1962, with music by Jobim and Portuguese lyrics by de Moraes; English lyrics were written later by Norman Gimbel.
