= Fort Santa Luzia =

Building in Elvas, Portalegre District, Portugal

- Forte de Santa Luzia
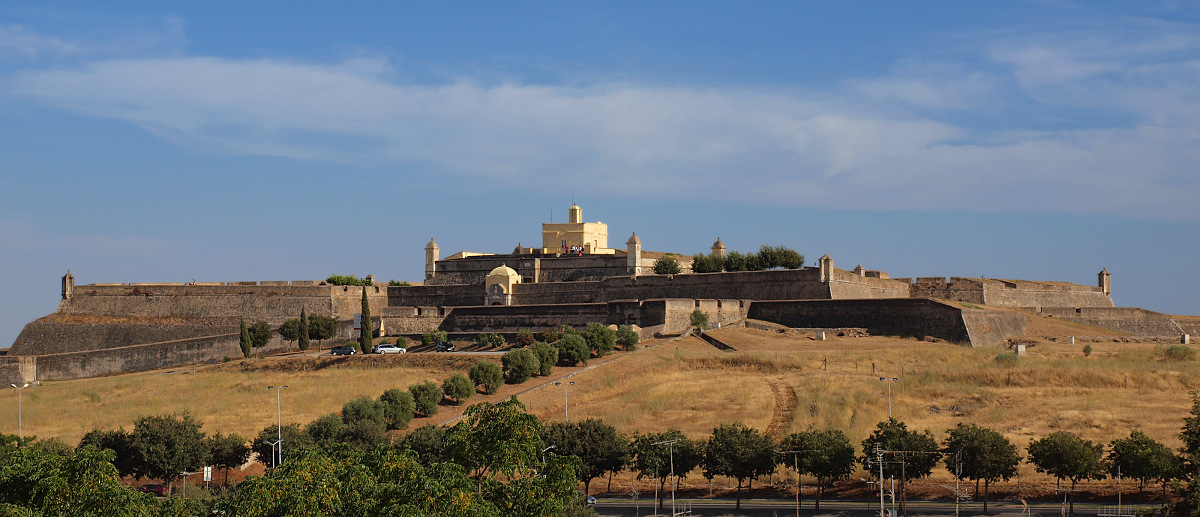
- Fort Santa Luzia

- Location in Portugal
- 38°53′40″N 7°9′51″W
- Part of: Garrison Border Town of Elvas and its Fortifications

History
- Built: 1763–1792

Fort Santa Luzia
UNESCO World Heritage Site
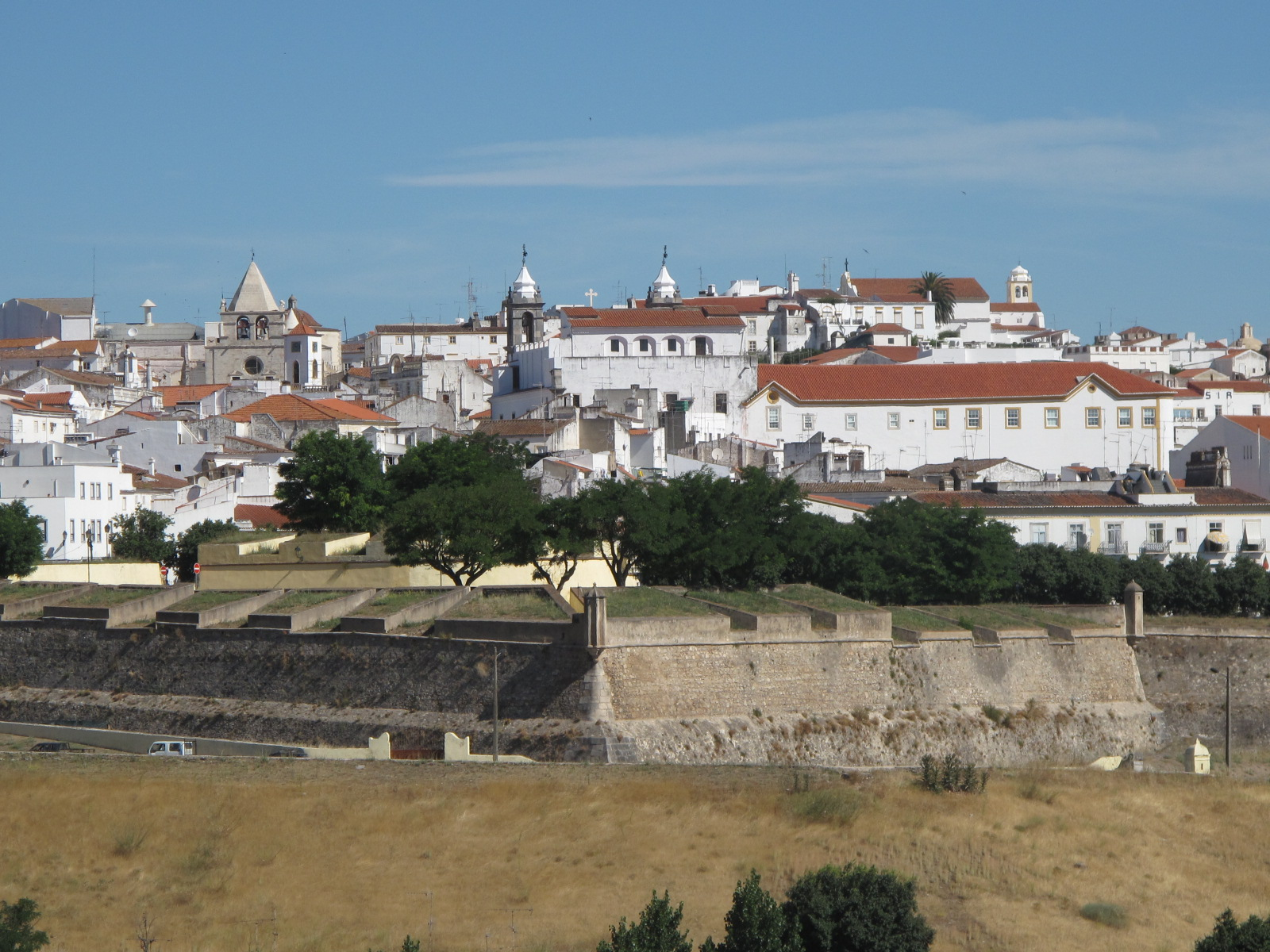
- Walls and fortifications of Elvas
- Interactive map of Fort Santa Luzia
- Official name: Garrison Border Town of Elvas and its Fortifications
- Location: Elvas, Portalegre District, Alentejo, Portugal
- Criteria: Cultural: (iv)
- Reference: 1367bis
- Inscription: 2012 (36th Session)
- Extensions: 2013
- Area: 179.356 ha (443.20 acres)
- Buffer zone: 690 ha (1,700 acres)

Portuguese National Monument
- Type: Non-movable
- Criteria: National Monument
- Designated: 26 September 1940
- Reference no.: IPA.00003244
- Coordinates: 38°52′50.23″N 7°9′47.96″W

Fort Santa Luzia is located in Alentejo, in the city of Elvas, district of Portalegre, in Portugal.

The Santa Luzia Fort has been classified as a National Monument since 1940. Together with Fort Piedade, Fort São Francisco, Fort São Mamede and Fort São Pedro, it was part of the defense of the stronghold of Elvas and is part of the complex of the "Garrison Border Town of Elvas and its Fortifications" classified since June 30, 2012 as a World Heritage Site by UNESCO.

Repeatedly besieged during the War of Restoration of Independence, it was during the siege of the city of Elvas, led by the Spanish commander Don Luis de Haro in 1658, that the fort stood out for its defenders heroic resistance. The siege of 1658 preceded the Battle of the Lines of Elvas on 14 January 1659.

In 2014, Fort Santa Luzia was integrated into a new project by the Portuguese Ministry of National Defense, created with the support of Turismo de Portugal, called Turismo Militar, which features historical itineraries based on Portuguese military history.

== History ==
The fort dates back to the context of the War of Restoration of Portuguese independence, having been commenced in 1641 by the initiative of governor-of-arms Matias de Albuquerque, who provided an initial sketch for a fort capable of housing 300 soldiers. That same year, it was redesigned by Sebastião Frias, as a star fort. The Genoese Hieronimo Rozzeti drew up a new project for it in 1642, which caused friction with other engineers, and which culminated in the discord of the French military engineer Charles Lassart. The controversy over the most adequate design of the fort was settled by the Flemish architect Cosmander who designed it with the support of the French engineer Jean Gilot. A larger "royal fort" (whose defensive perimeter matched the range of a musket) built in accordance with the architectural regularity of the "First Dutch Method of Fortification" was rejected in favour of a smaller "external fort" with greater military function, faster speed of construction but the same firepower. It incorporated several design novelties that preceded those put forward by Blaise Francois Pagan. The first stone was placed on April 1 of 1643, with the blessing of the bishop Dom Manuel da Cunha and the presence of the governor-general Martim Afonso de Melo, the masters-of-the-field Dom João da Costa and Dom João de Sousa, other ministers at arms and the local people and nobility. It's considered one of the finest examples of 17th century fortification works in Portugal.

By 1644 the fort was considered defensible though unfinished, and resisted a siege by forces commanded by the Carlo Andrea Caracciolo, marquis of Torrecuso The fort was completed in 1648.

Along with the other fortifications of its defensive system, during the Battle of the Lines of Elvas it successfully resisted the heavy siege imposed on it, from October 22, 1658 to January 14, 1659, by the Spanish army under the command of Don Luis Méndez de Haro.

Spanish and French troops attacked Elvas on April 14 1706 as part of the War of the Spanish Succession but failed to take the city. In 1712 the fort resisted a siege by the Marquis of Bay, the engines of whom were battered by the forts artillery. In 1801 the Spanish minister Godoy demanded the city's capitulation as part of the War of Oranges, but failed to assault it.

The city's command surrendered to the Spanish during the Peninsular War, and the fort was occupied by the forces of general Francisco Solano, captain-general of the army of Andaluzia, but was later replaced by French troops, who later abandon the city as part of the Convention of Sintra. The fort served as a prison during the Portuguese Civil War.

Between 1999 and 2000 it was converted into a military museum, open every day except monday, between 10am to 6pm (5pm in the Winter).

== Features ==
The fort has a square plan, three moats, reinforced to east and south with two ravelins, and pentagon shaped bastions at the edges, in the Vauban style, named Santo António, Santa Isabel, São Pedro e Nossa Senhora da Conceição. The external defense works give it a polygon star shape, along with a tunnel that reached all the way to main Elvas and Nossa Senhora de Graça, which was blocked off when the fort was opened to the public. It has several barracks and two cisterns which could provide water to 300 or 400 men for two to three months.

== Gallery ==
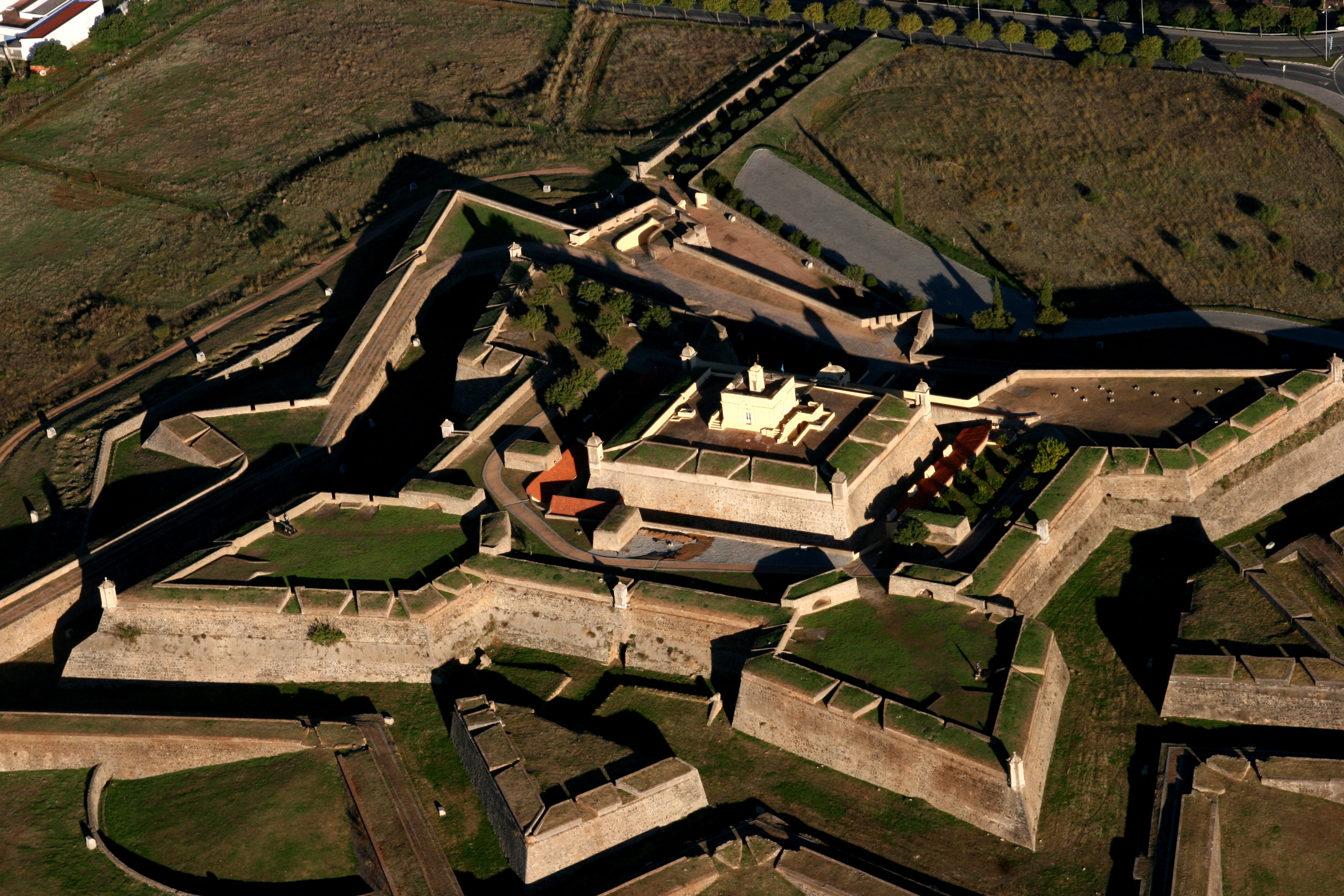
Birds-eye view of the fort.

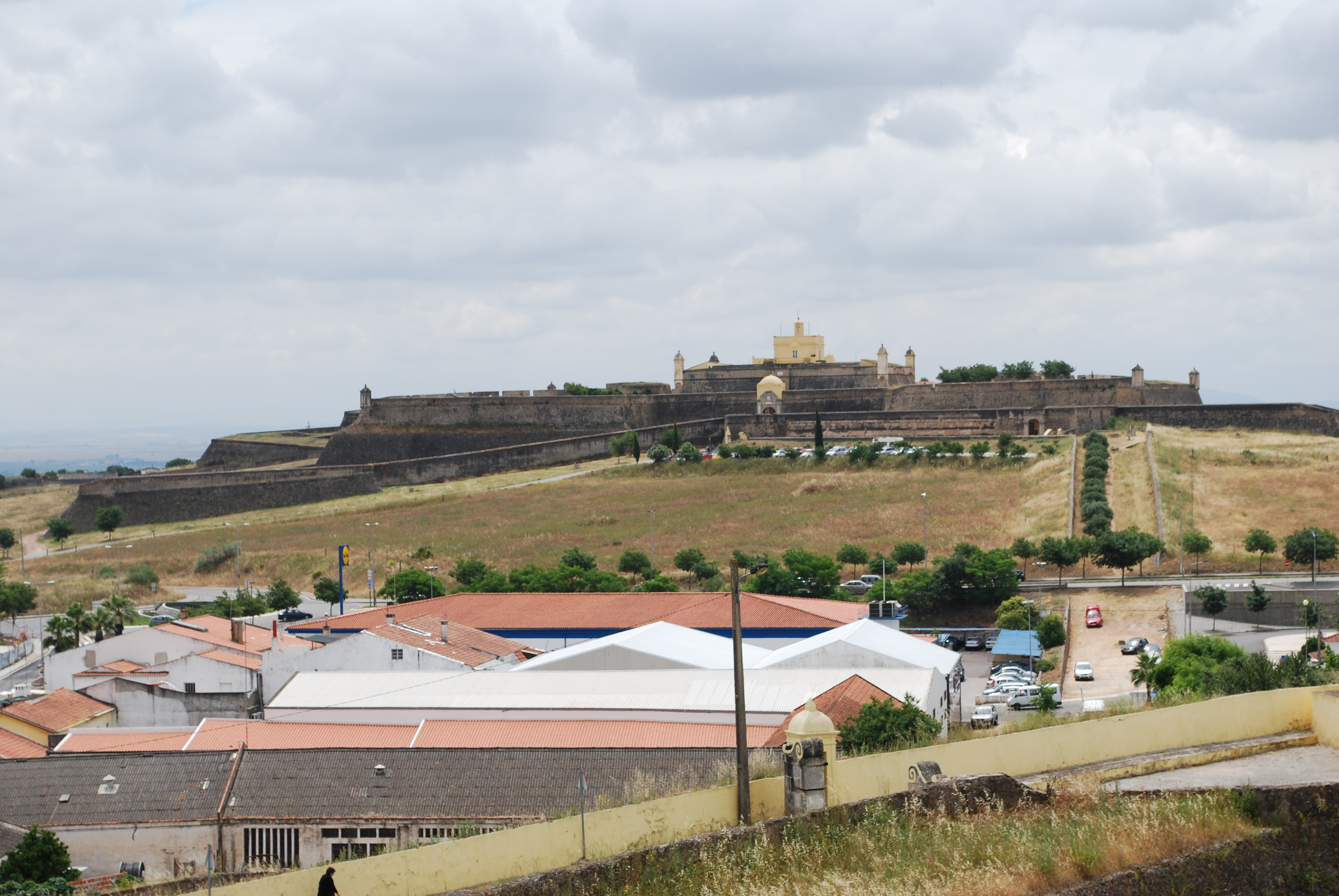
The fort as seen from a nearby neighbourhood.

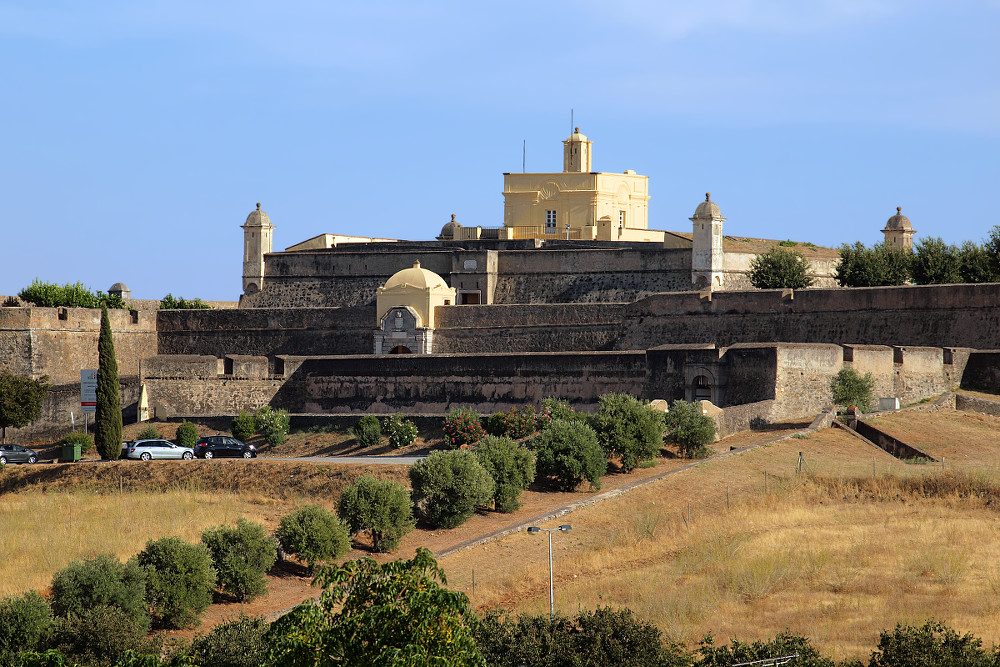
Close up of the walls.

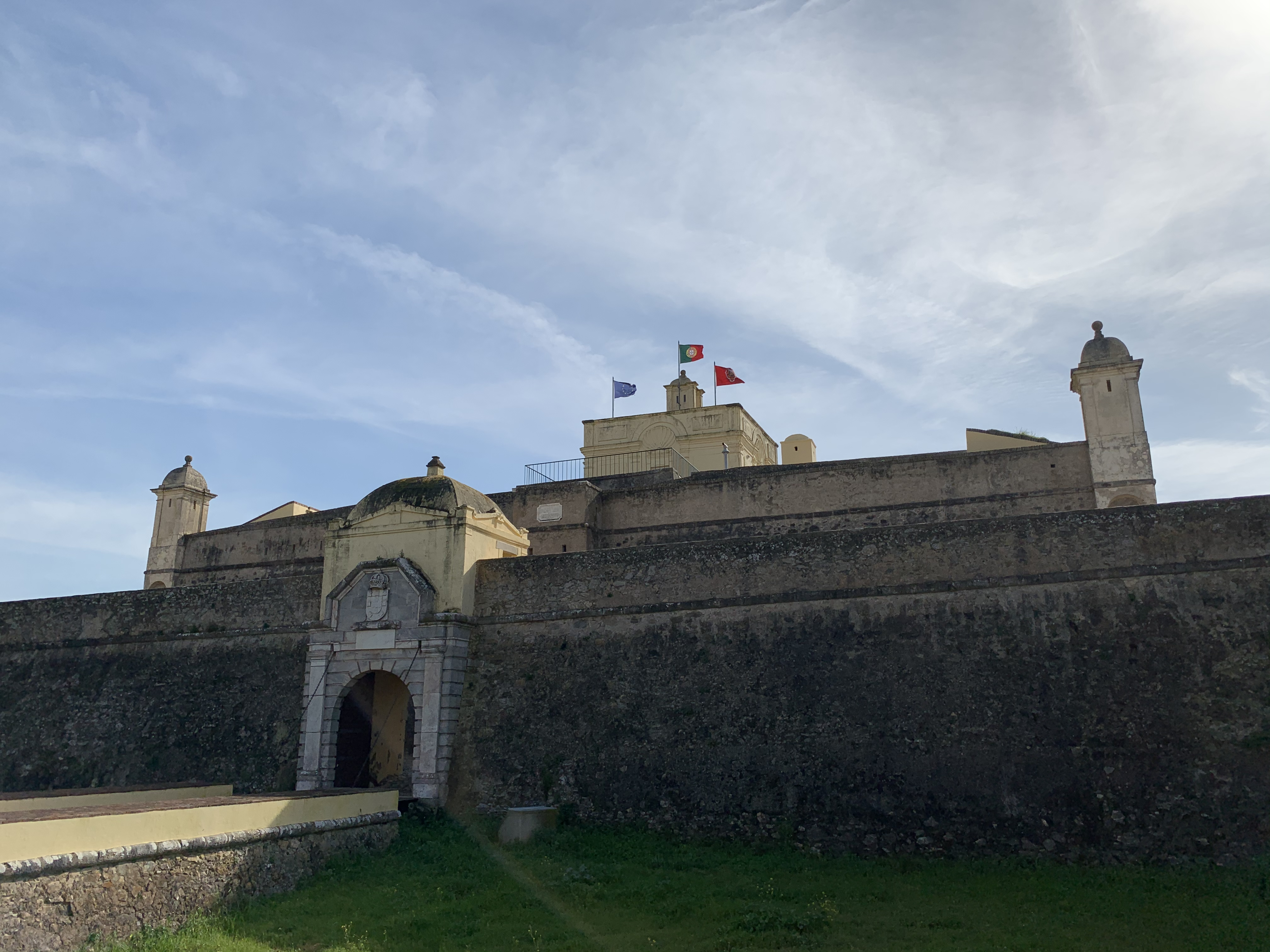
Gateway

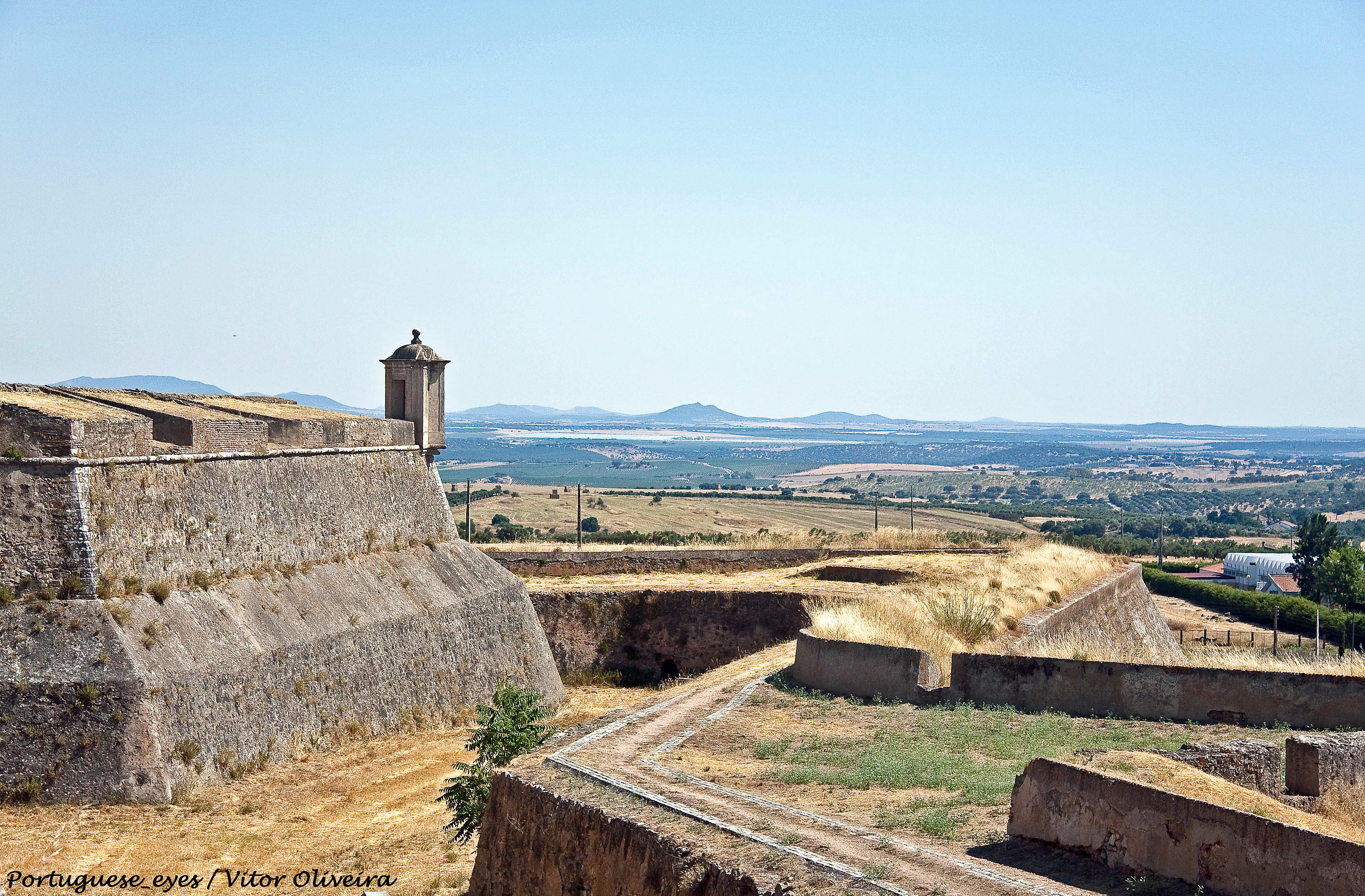
View of the walls.

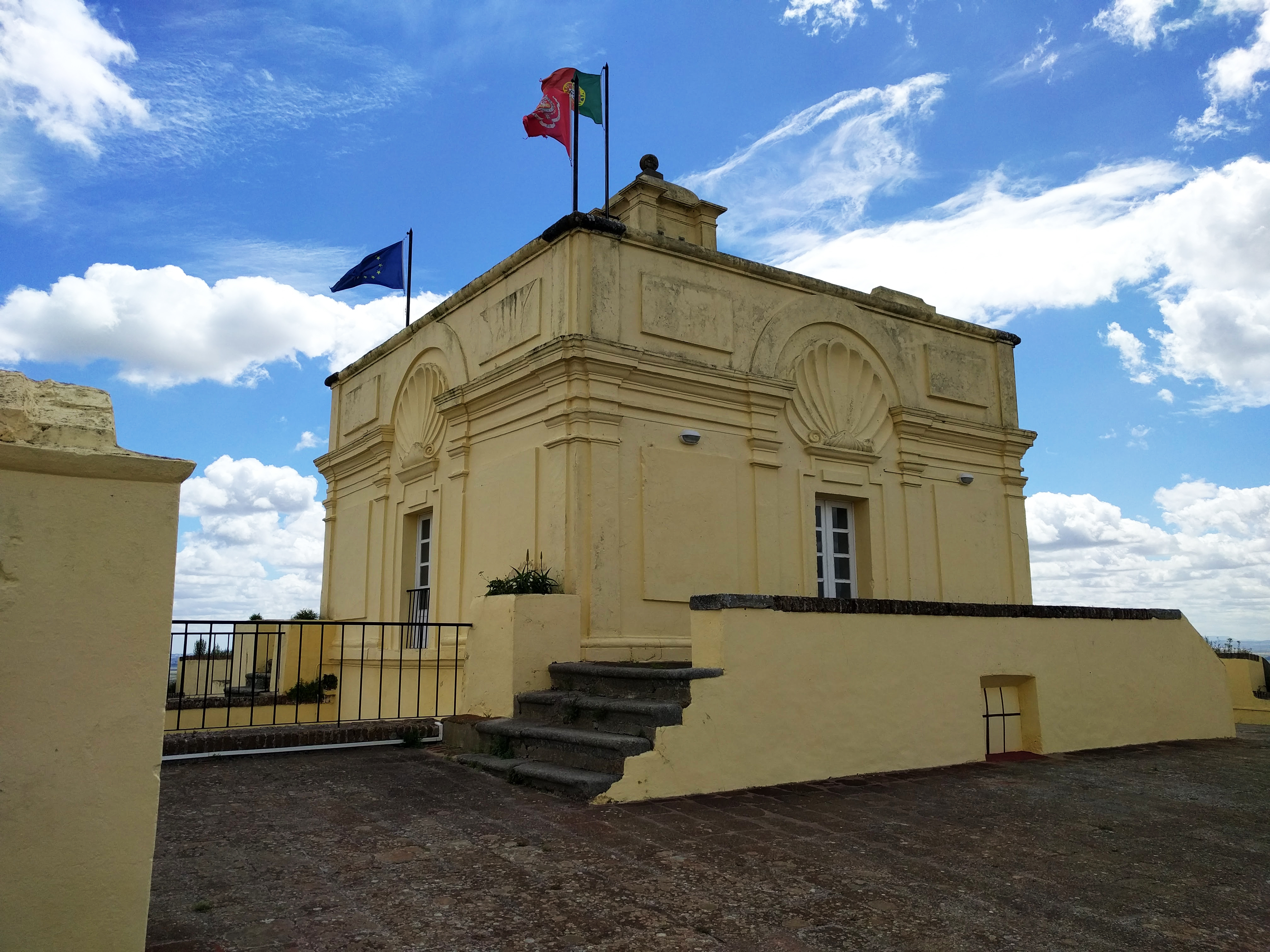
Commanders quarters.

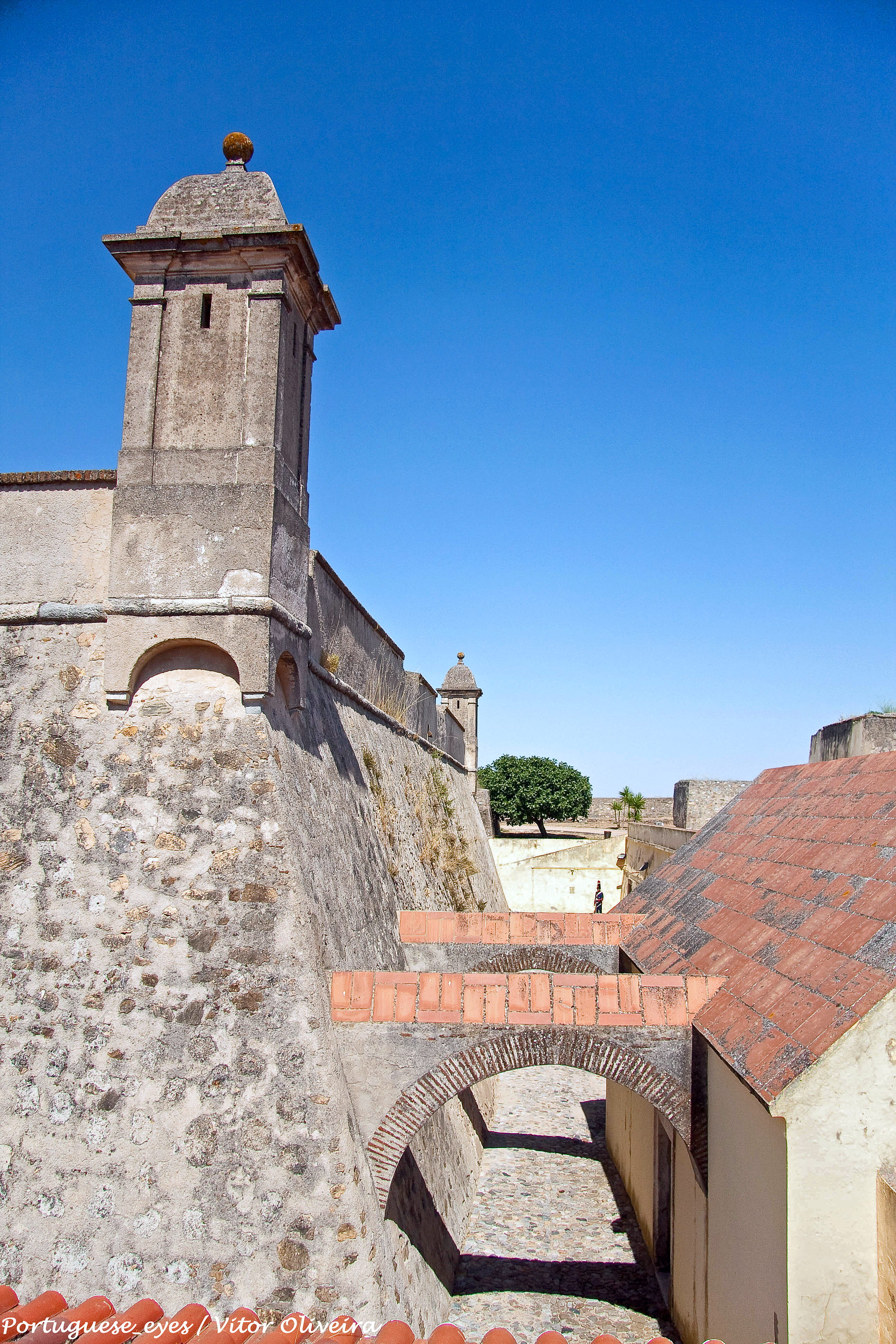
Moat and sentry-box

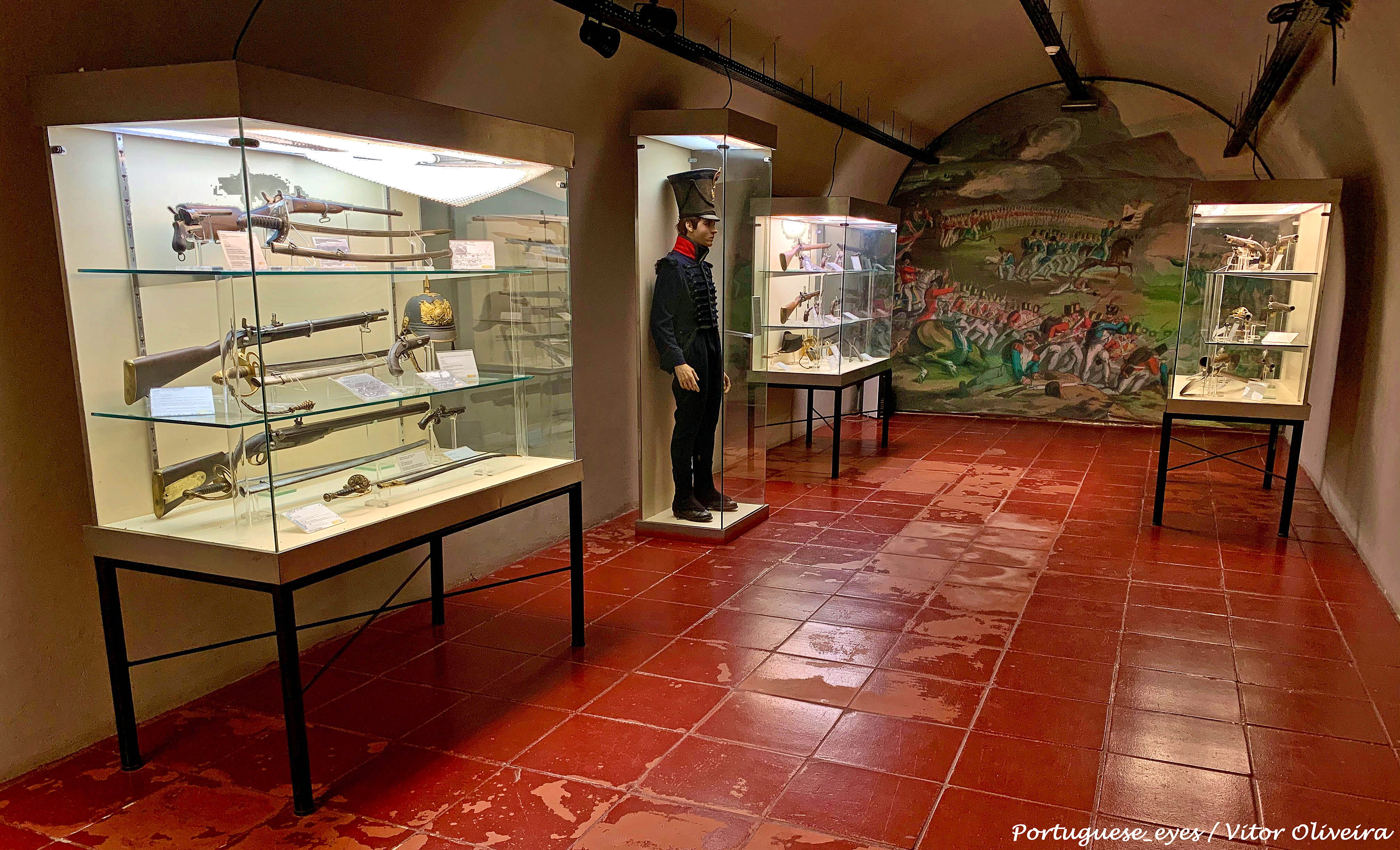
Military museum within the fort.

== See also ==
- Nossa Senhora da Graça Fort
