= Ruy Teixeira Guerra =

Portuguese diplomat

Rui Teixeira Guerra

Personal details
- Born: Rui da Fonseca e Sousa Camões Teixeira Guerra; 1902 Santa Eulália, Elvas, Portugal
- Died: 1996 (aged 93–94) Lisbon, Portugal
- Occupation: Diplomat
- Known for: Leading Portugal’s post-war European integration efforts

Rui da Fonseca e Sousa Camões Teixeira Guerra (1902–1996) was a Portuguese diplomat and one of the principal architects of Portugal’s post-war European diplomacy. Often referred to as Senhor Europa, he played a decisive role in the country’s engagement with the Marshall Plan, the OEEC, NATO, EFTA, and ultimately the European Economic Community, laying groundwork that would lead to Portugal's accession to the European Communities in 1986.

== Early life and diplomatic service ==
Teixeira Guerra was born in Santa Eulália (Elvas) in 1902. He earned a law degree from the University of Lisbon and joined the Portuguese diplomatic service in 1931.

His early postings included consul positions in Montréal (1936), Berlin (1939–1940), New York (1942), Boston, and Liverpool. These years shaped his outlook on the global role of diplomacy and Portugal’s place in the post-war order.

== Post-war diplomacy and the Marshall Plan ==
In 1947, Teixeira Guerra was posted as First Secretary to the Portuguese legation in Paris. He attended the Conference of Paris as Portugal’s only representative during the negotiation of the Marshall Plan.

Although the Portuguese government initially rejected U.S. financial aid, Teixeira Guerra positioned Portugal to benefit from the European Recovery Program by defending the possibility of participation at the OEEC. When the government reversed its stance, he became Portugal’s permanent representative to the OEEC (1948–1956), chairing its executive committee in 1955 and representing Portugal in meetings of the IMF and World Bank.

== NATO and transatlantic relations ==
Teixeira Guerra was an early advocate of Portugal's transatlantic alignment. He played a key role in Portugal’s admission to NATO in 1949 and represented the country in NATO’s Economic and Financial Division between 1951 and 1956.

== European Free Trade and GATT ==
In 1956, promoted to Minister Plenipotentiary, Teixeira Guerra became Director-General for Economic and Consular Affairs at the Ministry of Foreign Affairs. He led Portugal’s negotiations to join the European Free Trade Association (EFTA), securing entry in 1960. He served as Portugal’s ambassador to Switzerland and permanent representative to both the EFTA and GATT until 1966, presiding over the EFTA Council in 1966.

== Portugal’s relationship with the EEC ==
As European integration accelerated in the 1970s, Teixeira Guerra returned to prominence, chairing the Comissão de Estudos sobre a Integração Económica Europeia. His recommendations led to Portugal’s 1972 Free Trade Agreements with the EEC and ECSC.

He also led the Grupo de Trabalho Especial for negotiations with the EEC, setting the foundation for future membership. After the 1974 revolution, he continued to advise policymakers, culminating in Portugal’s formal application for EEC membership in 1977.

== Later life and legacy ==
Though retired, Teixeira Guerra was frequently consulted during Portugal's negotiation and accession process to the European Communities. He witnessed the signing of the Treaty of Accession in 1985 and died in Lisbon in 1996. In 2009, the Municipality of Portalegre held a tribute recognizing his lasting contribution to European integration.

== Selected writings ==
- Algumas Notas Sobre as Relações entre os Estados Unidos e a Europa. Boletim Interno do Ministério dos Negócios Estrangeiros, N.º 11, 1952.
- Cooperação económica europeia. Instituto de Altos Estudos Militares, 1958–59.
- Os Movimentos de Cooperação e Integração Europeia no Pós-Guerra. Instituto Nacional de Administração, 1981.
- Alguns Aspectos Passados e Presentes da Integração Europeia. Sociedade de Geografia de Lisboa, 1978.
