= Amoreira Aqueduct =

16th-century aqueduct in Elvas, Portugal

- Aqueducto da Amoreira
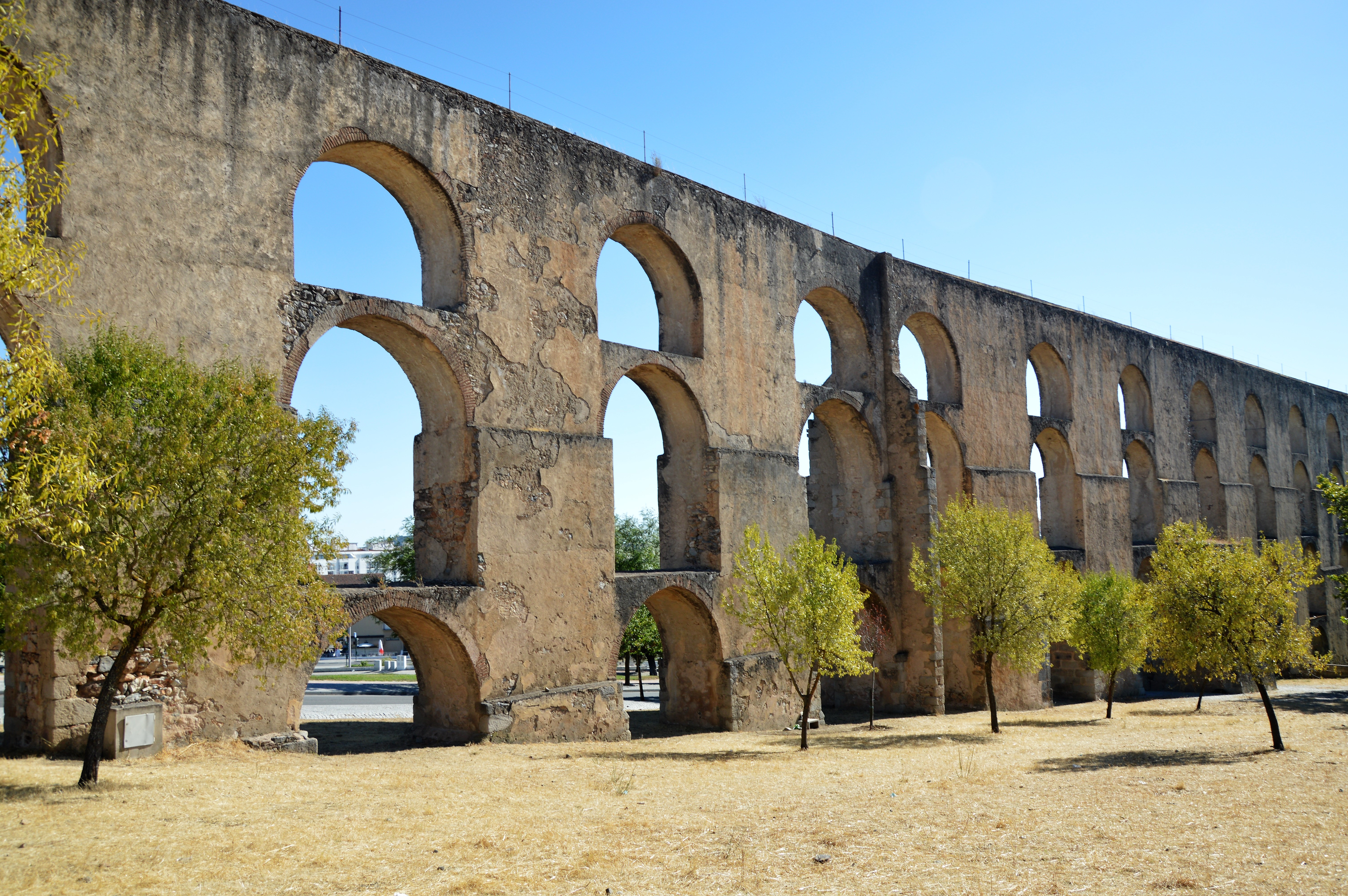

General information
- Type: Aqueduct
- Architectural style: Medieval
- Location: Assunção, Ajuda, Salvador e Santo Ildefonso, Elvas, Portugal
- Coordinates: 38°52′40.8″N 7°10′20.6″W
- Opened: 1498
- Owner: Portuguese Republic

Technical details
- Material: Mortared stone masonry

Design and construction
- Architect: Afonso Álvares (1573)

Portuguese National Monument
- Type: Non-movable
- Criteria: National Monument
- Designated: 16 June 1910
- Reference no.: IPA.00003217

Amoreira Aqueduct
UNESCO World Heritage Site
- Interactive map of Amoreira Aqueduct
- Official name: Garrison Border Town of Elvas and its Fortifications
- Location: Elvas, Portalegre District, Alentejo, Portugal
- Criteria: Cultural: (iv)
- Reference: 1367bis
- Inscription: 2012 (36th Session)
- Extensions: 2013
- Area: 179.356 ha (443.20 acres)
- Buffer zone: 690 ha (1,700 acres)
- Coordinates: 38°52′50.23″N 7°9′47.96″W

The Amoreira Aqueduct (Aqueduto da Amoreira) is a 16th-century aqueduct (begun in 1537) that spans the Portuguese municipality of Elvas, bringing water into the fortified seat.

== History ==
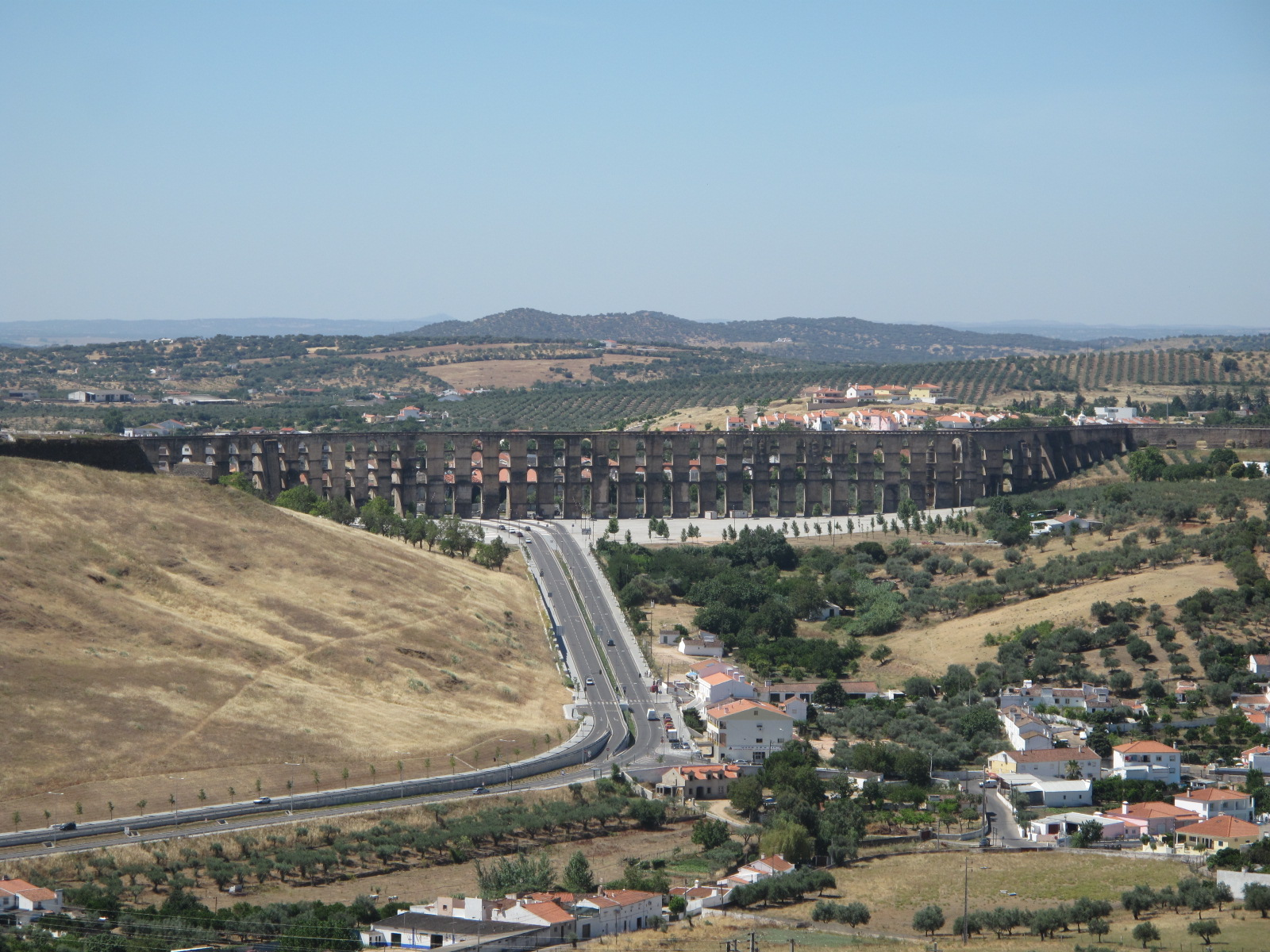
Segment of the aqueduct at the entranceway to the town

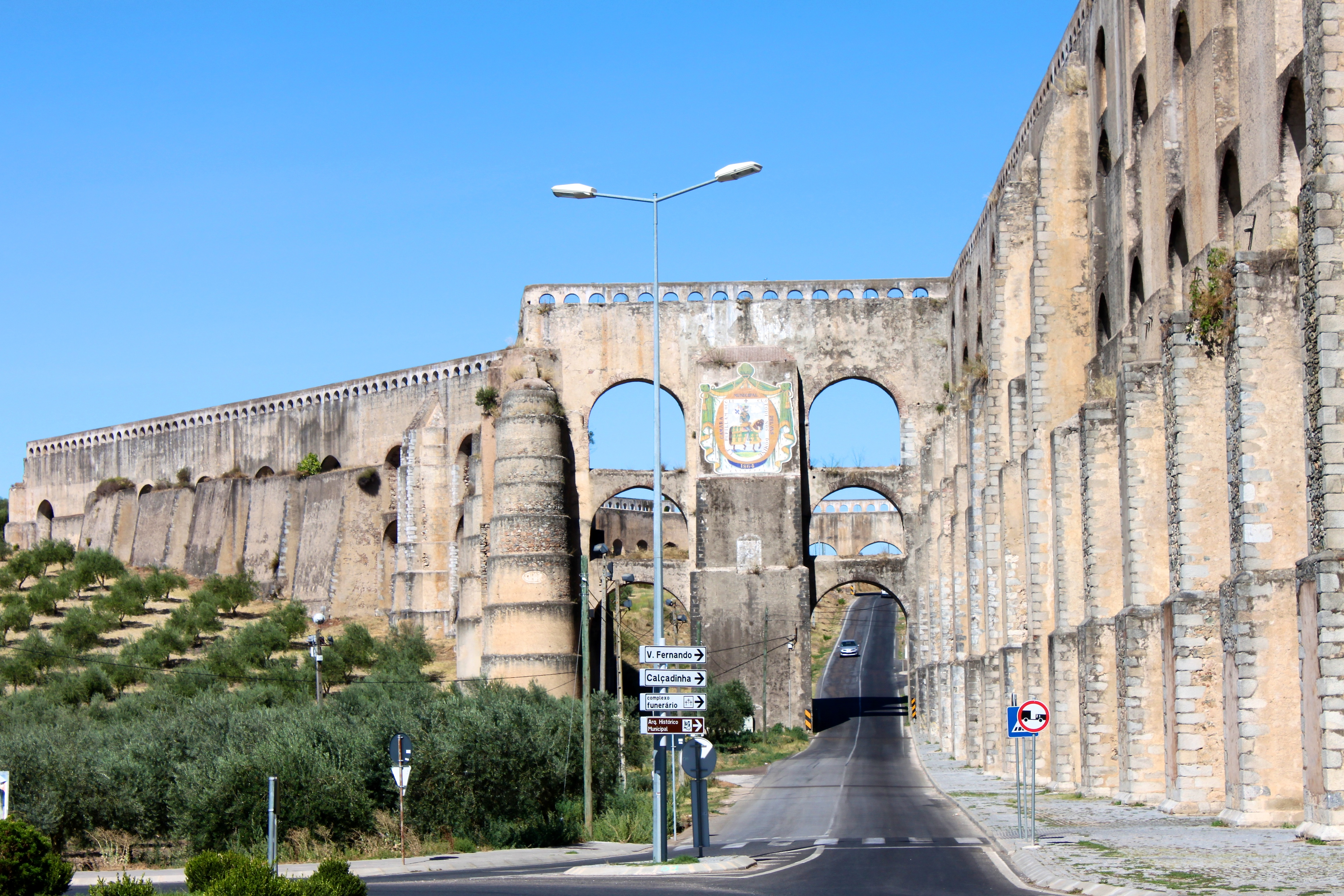
The kink and roadway of the Amoreira Aqueduct showing one of the 1864 azulejo tiles

By around 1498, the only fountain and source of potable water since the Moorish occupation had been the Poço de Alcalá, alongside the Porta do Bispo. As the well had already begun drying-up, and owing to the difficulty of gathering water from the wells surrounding the town, King D. Manuel authorized a tax (the Real de Água) to fix the Poço de Alcalá. Yet, the attempts did not meet with success, and an idea developed to collect water from Amoreira, some 8 kilometres (5.0 mi) away. Consequently, in 1529 the first works to build the aqueduct were begun. In 1537, then King John III intervened by sending architect Francisco de Arruda to Elvas, to make changes to the primitive plan. Owing to the lack of funds for such a project, the King then authorized the diversion of monies from fines and sales associated with the sale of municipal lands for the project, including some loans from the children's orphanages in Elves and Estremoz.

These early problems with the aqueduct's construction, were portents of future problems. Sometime during 1533, the work done by Lourenço Domingues (the receiver for the public works in Elvas, Campo Maior and Olivença) must have been unsatisfactory, for he was discharged on 9 September. Following various diversions of water, the post of Visitador do Cano (Seer of Pipe) was established in 1542. A year later, Diogo Mendes was responsible for the maintenance of the aqueduct, receiving 6000 reais, paid by the town. But, by 1547, the construction was suspended due to a lack of funds, but were re-initiated in 1571. But, on 20 March 1558, Queen D. Catherine recommended that the town work on the aqueduct. King D. Sebastian later authorized the application of a levy on the residents of Elvas, considered equivalent to each's income. Later that year, on 23 August, Sebastian personally inspected the aqueduct and finding the works incomplete, he ordered the Senate (on 29 May 1573) to correct the remaining sections, along with Afonso Álvares. The King's successor would have similar problems with this project; in 1579, Cardinal King Henrique solicited the bishops of Elvas to participate monetarily in the aqueduct's construction.

=== Philippian dynasty ===
With the Castilian invasion in 1580, priority was given to the city's fortifications and it was decided, if necessary, to drop the project. One of the conditions made by the Portuguese, during the surrender negotiations of the city, was that the Amoreira Aqueduct be complete. The city looked into new springs in the foothills, sometime around 1602, in order to improve the water pressure/volume. The aqueduct project was restarted in 1606, with the imposition of a new Real de Água tax. But, following various stops on the project, on 5 March 1610, the municipal council solicited the King to re-continue the aqueduct's construction, while proposing alterations in the project in order to provide water to the higher settlements of the region. King Philip II authorized the continuation of project on 11 July 1610, and sent Diogo Marques Lucas to study the plan in order to improve its efficiency on 26 July. Lucas determined the need to elevate the aqueduct an additional 25 palms (1 palm = 22 centimeters) in order to better improve water delivery to the Largo da Misericórdia.

The first waters reached into the city gates in 1620, to a provisionary fountain at the Church of Madalena. On 23 June 1622, the aqueduct and Fonte da Misericórdia were inaugurated, but, owing to structural problems with the "completed" project, interventions were needed. In 1625, it was decided to construct hollowed buttresses, filled in with dirt and loose stone. Ancillary projects began to develop following the completion of the main project, including diversion of water down the Rua de São Lourenço, a lengthy project owing to the rock substrata. These projects resulted in the extension of the taxes on 1 August 1627, for another two years, that included the construction of city's fountains. By 1628, the aqueduct was successfully fed the Fonte da Misericórdia, Chafariz da Madalena, Chafariz de São Lourenço, Chafariz de São Domingos, Chafariz de São Vicente and the Chafariz da Alameda, and construction of fountains of Biquinha, Cavaleiros and São José were underway.

=== Independence ===
In 1641, King D. John IV authorized the demolition of the aqueduct in order to construct a new fortification. Martinho Afonso de Melo, Count of São Lourenço, proposed the construction of a cistern, in order that most of the aqueduct could be maintained functioning. It was not until 1650 that the huge cistern was built beneath Elvas, under the direction of Nicholas de Langres, allowing for the storage of water capable of providing enough for the entire population for four months, when rationed judiciously. Two arches of the aqueduct were destroyed following a tempest in 1646, and two years earlier Castilian forces had already destroyed or damaged segments of the vital resource. Therefore, it came as no surprise that in May 1648 a discussion began on whether destroying the aqueduct was necessary, in order to improve the city's defences. In 1652, the Count of Soure ordered the construction of subterranean pipe to feed the city water, thereby maintaining the city's defences (but also resulting in the partial loss of the aqueduct). Three years later, Governor André de Albuquerque Ribafria also requested that that aqueduct be demolished, and that the segments that corresponded with the citadel be converted to subterranean passages.

During the 1663 Castilian invasions by John Joseph of Austria, the aqueduct suffered some damage. In order to remedy its vulnerability, two redoubts were constructed in Outeiro dos Pobres and Outeiro de São Francisco, reinforced by a zone that crossed the two by casements of canon emplacements.

A new plan for the aqueduct was drafted in 1683 by Francisco Álvares Ribeiro, that included 7,790 metres (25,560 ft) system. On 30 March 1689, Manuel Moniz was nominated to the position of master-builder for the aqueduct, on the death of Francisco Ferreira (who exercised this post), receiving a stipend of 12,000 reis annually. In 1698, there was a rupture that linked the hospital.

By the beginning of the 18th century water pressure was already much reduced, due to the accumulation of calcium (a problem that persisted until the 19th century). A sedimentation arch was constructed at the Borracha spring to alleviate some of these problems. João Fernandes Cordeiro was named master-builder, and on 20 June 1702, Francisco Martins was named "master of pipe" for the Amoreira Aqueduct, following the death of Manuel Moniz, receiving 12,000 reis annually. In 1708, protests resulted in damage to the structure. King John V suggested substituting the piping to a fountain system (or inverted siphon system). But, the municipal authority could only decide on reconstructing the arches, since the system was impractical in case of ruptures, requiring opening-up the entire network in case of localizing the problem. Alternately, the structure was reinforced with piers and in 1715, the system was expanded with waters from the Poço do Concão, later nine assorted springs, including one from the Serra do Bispo region. On 5 June 1727, João Fernandes Cordeiro was confirmed as the new aqueduct master-builder. The system was also expanded in 1733 with the waters from the nine springs situated in the Herdade de Trinta-Alferes, reinforced in 1739 with the exploration of the Poço do Gorgulhão in 1743. On 17 March 1745, José Ramalho Rogado took over the position of aqueduct master-builder, responsible for expanding the water supply with the piping to the Poço Seco spring. In January 1796, an earthquake destroyed two arches in the Outeiro dos Pobres, which was quickly repaired. In 1825, the discovery of new springs in the Herdade de Trinta-Alferes, resulted in the exploration by Lieutenant Francisco de Paulo de Sousa Pegado. This man later directed new repairs on the aqueduct between 1825 and 1827. Between 26 and 27 February 1846, a seasonal storm destroyed a buttress.

The first municipal azulejos were erected in 1864, and were later supported with alternates dating to 1873. In 1870, the aldermen requested that the Cortes provide funding to repair and clean the structure, as well as construct a supplementary canal to facilitate future cleaning. During these motions, it was indicated that calcium buildup in the pipes should be removed every ten years, to remedy these problems.

During the 19th century, the exploration of the Herdade dos Vales de Santarém springs was initiated.

Between 1872 and 1890, the aqueduct underwent important public works to conserve and restore the aqueduct, that included the construction of a secondary pipe and construction of 462 supplementary arches. By 1902, the springs were considered impotable, except those at Ruy de Mello and São Lourenço, and continued to feed the aqueduct. In the 1980s, the aqueduct continued to feed the city of Elvas, by way of the cistern, using waters raised from the Trinta-Alferes and Algaravenha springs. Repair and cleaning of the piping occurred in 1995.

== Architecture ==
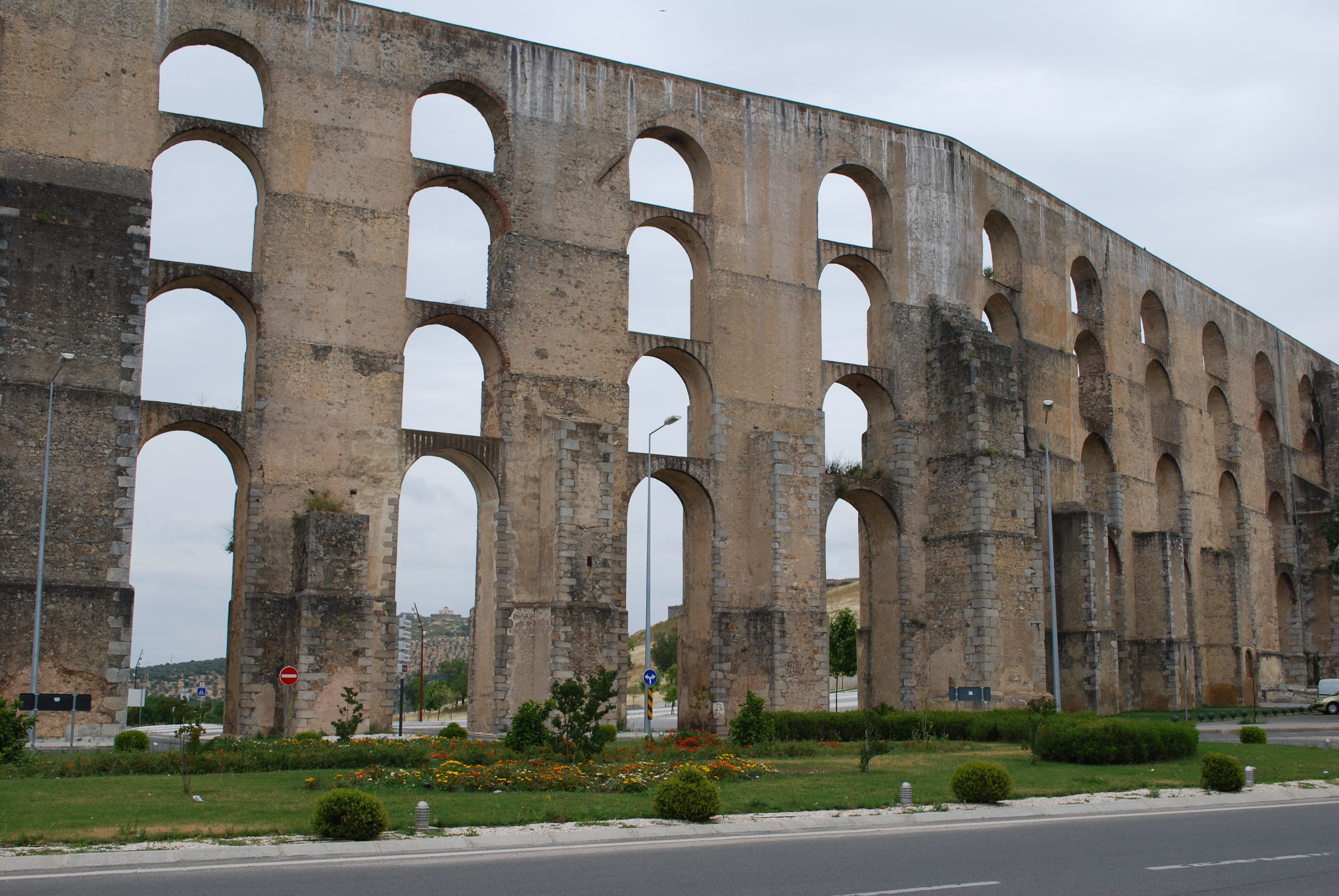
The four registers of the waterway at the extreme height

The aqueduct crosses the rural-urban divide, covering the plains across the valley of São Francisco and Rossio, encountering the springs at Fonte da Amoreira (in the Serra do Bispo) and terminating at the Fonte da Misericórdia. In front of the Elvas portion of the aqueduct is the Municipal Gardens, while to the south is the link to the Convent of São Francisco, protected in the southwest by a ravelin.

The aqueduct has a length of 7,054 metres (23,143 ft) from its spring in the Serra do Bispo until the Chafariz do Jardim, and another 450 metres (1,480 ft) to the town fountain. Its track includes 1,367 metres (4,485 ft) subterranean segments, 4,049 metres (13,284 ft) at ground level, while 1,683 metres (5,522 ft) include arcade segments. From Outeiro de São Francisco is the second canal, which redirects waters to Outeiro dos Pobres, identifiable in the arcade at Rossio. In total there are 833 arches, with at most four registers at any one time (diminishing size at higher altitudes), supported by rectangular pillars and strengthened by semi-circular and pyramidal buttresses. The structure includes the municipal coat-of-arms constructed of marble or azulejo. A reservoir is located in Horta de Trinta-Alferes, a rounded arch in the São Gonçalo downtown (Herdade da Serra do Bispo), as well as an arch and tank at the spring of Borracha.
