= André de Albuquerque Ribafria =

His Lordship André de Albuquerque Ribafria
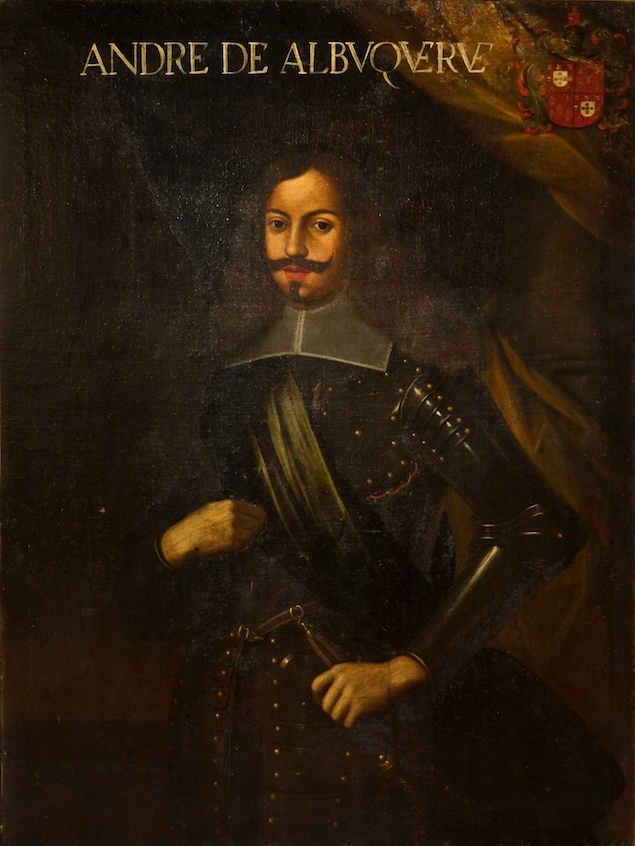
- Portrait by Feliciano de Almeida, c. 1673–1675

Personal details
- Born: 1621 Sintra, Portugal
- Died: 14 January 1659 Elvas, Portugal
- Resting place: Chapel of St. Antony, Church of St. Francis of Capuchos

André de Albuquerque Ribafria (1621 – 14 January 1659) was a 17th-century Portuguese nobleman and military leader. Orphaned at a young age, Ribafria won fame as a commander during the Portuguese Restoration War, fighting in several notable battles before being killed in action at the Battle of the Lines of Elvas.

== Biography ==
Ribafria was born in Sintra, Portugal on 30 May 1621. He and his family were part of the Portuguese noble class, and when his remaining parent died in 1636, Ribafria and his three siblings were placed under the care of Antão de Almada, Count of Avranches.

In 1638, Ribafria was deployed to the Portuguese colony of Brazil to fight against forces of the Dutch Republic; at the time, Portugal was indirectly ruled (via the Iberian Union) by King Philip IV of Spain, who was engaged in a decades-long war with the Dutch. Ribafria returned to Portugal the following year, and was immersed in the increasingly-prominent calls for the restoration of the Portuguese monarchy.

On 1 December 1640, a cadre of Portuguese noblemen (later known as the Forty Conspirators) revolted against Spanish rule and crowned John IV of Portugal as king of an independent Portugal. His guardian was one of the conspirators, and so Ribafria quickly joined the pro-independence faction inside Portugal, eventually being granted a command in the reformed Portuguese army.

During the Restoration War, Ribafria fought in numerous engagements on the Spanish-Portuguese border. Ribafria was praised for his bravery and leadership abilities, and was commended as a highly effective cavalry commander. During an engagement near the Spanish city of Badajoz in 1668, Ribafria became ill, and was forced to withdraw to the Portuguese town of Elvas. While convalescing there, the town was besieged by a large Spanish army. Though still stricken with illness, Ribafria helped to coordinate the defense of the town. After several weeks of siege, a Portuguese relief force (commanded by António Luís de Meneses) arrived and assaulted the Spanish siege works, beginning the Battle of the Lines of Elvas. Limping into battle and wielding a cane, Ribafria encouraged the garrison of Elvas to sally from the town and attack the Spanish besiegers. During this action, he was shot below the arm and mortally wounded.

Following his death Ribafria's body was buried in the Chapel of St. Antony in the Church of St. Francis of Capuchos.
