= Rondão Almeida =

Portuguese politician (born 1945)

- Rondão Almeida in 2007

Mayor of Elvas
- Incumbent
- Assumed office 27 September 2021
- Preceded by: Nuno Mocinha
- In office 12 December 1993 – 29 September 2013
- Preceded by: João Carpinteiro
- Succeeded by: Nuno Mocinha

Member of the Elvas City Council
- Incumbent
- Assumed office 12 December 1993

Personal details
- Born: 21 December 1942 (age 83) Elvas, Portugal
- Party: Independent (since 2015)
- Other political affiliations: Socialist Party (until 2015)
- Awards: Order of Prince Henry (2013)

José António Rondão Almeida ComIH (born 21 December 1942) is a Portuguese politician.

== Biography ==
Almeida is Mayor (president of the Municipal Chamber) of Elvas since 27 September 2021. He was also Mayor between 4 January 1993 and 12 October 2013 (reelected in 1997, 2001, 2005 and 2009).

Rondão Almeida was forced to step down as Mayor after the 2013 local election because the new electoral law made him unable to seek another consecutive reelection. He was succeeded by Nuno Mocinha, who was Deputy Mayor under him, and continued working in the City Hall on a different role.

In May 2016, after falling apart with Mayor Mocinha, Rondão Almeida announced he was going to run again to the position of Mayor as an independent. His party was second in the 2017 elections. However, he ran again in the 2021 elections, and won.

Some important structures built in Elvas (using public funds) during his terms are named after him, including the main concert hall, the underground car park, an entire neighbourhood in a nearby village, a care home, some main roads, and there are plaques all over the municipality with his name on every new or refurbished structure inaugurated by him.

== See also ==
- Elvas
