= Battle of the Lines of Elvas =

Battle in the Portuguese Restoration War

- Part of the Portuguese Restoration War
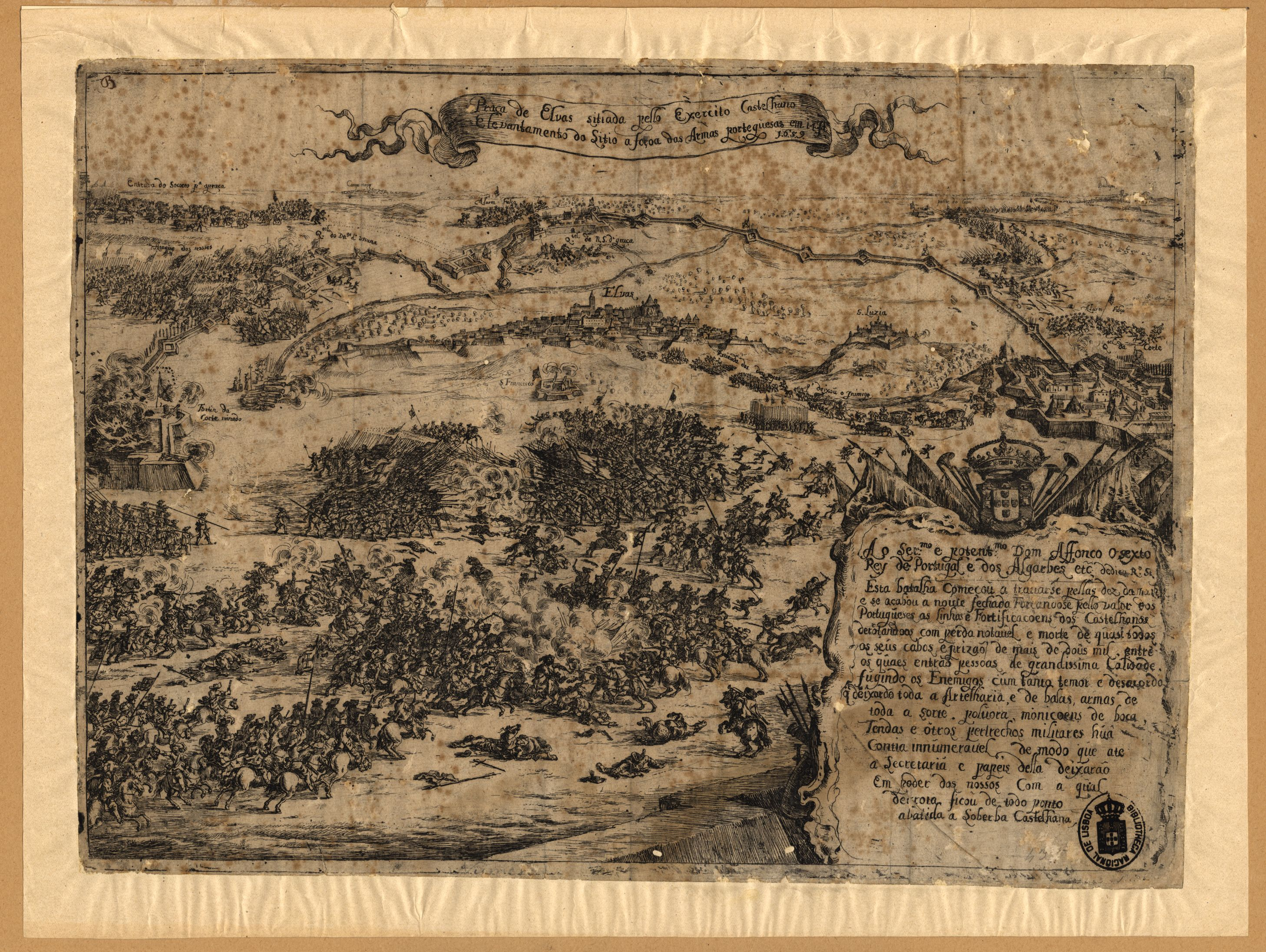
- Praça de Elvas sitiada pello Exercito Castelhano e levantamento do Sitio a forçoa das armas porteguesas em. 14.Ja. 1.6.5.9., engraving by Dirk Stoop, c. 1662
Date	14 January 1659
Location	Elvas, Portalegre District, Portugal 38°53′27″N 7°10′37″W
Result	Portuguese victory

Belligerents
Portugal	Spain

Commanders and leaders
António Meneses; André Ribafria †	Luis de Haro

Strength
10,500; 50 cannons	15,800; 10 cannons

Casualties and losses
898 killed, wounded and captured	11,200 killed, wounded and captured
- Location within Portugal Battle of the Lines of Elvas (Spain) Battle of the Lines of Elvas (Mediterranean)

The Battle of the Lines of Elvas (Portuguese pronunciation: [ˈɛlvɐʃ]), was fought on 14 January 1659, in Elvas, between Portugal and Spain during the Portuguese Restoration War. It ended in a decisive Portuguese victory achieved by commanders António Meneses and André Ribafria.

The battle took place during the Spanish siege of Elvas under the lead of Luis de Haro; the Portuguese garrison under the leadership of Ribafria was later supported by a field Portuguese army under Meneses, which attacked the Spanish besiegers from the rear while the garrison attacked from the front. Ribafria was the one who reformed the Portuguese cavalry into a formidable force. While skillfully exercising his command, he was killed in this clash. In addition, the Spaniards had very few cannons compared to the Portuguese garrison and field force. Thus, the Spanish army was decisively assaulted from both sides and routed.

== Background ==
By 1659, the Portuguese Restoration War which began in 1640 had degenerated into a stalemate. Other than cross border raids, little fighting had occurred and neither the Spanish or Portuguese armies could achieve a decisive battlefield victory. Philip IV of Spain sought to end the conflict by laying siege to and capturing a major Portuguese position, thereby luring out and destroying any Portuguese army that tried to aid the embattled garrison.

The town of Elvas was chosen as a target due to the threat it posed to the Spanish city of Badajoz, as seen during the Battle of Montijo in 1644 when a Portuguese army based at Elvas had crossed the border, raided Spanish towns, and attacked a Spanish army. The capture of Elvas and Fort Santa Luzia would also allow the Spanish Army to proceed down the Estremoz road to the Portuguese capital of Lisbon if they so chose. The Portuguese court was aware of the Spanish threat to the city and had greatly reinforced the strength of the city's defensive fortifications during the course of the war. However, years of only minor military action in the area had degraded the readiness of the garrison, and the city was unprepared for a siege. In addition, though the Spanish preparation for the offensive was detected, the vast majority the Portuguese Army was deployed in the north of the country in preparation for a suspected Spanish attack there.

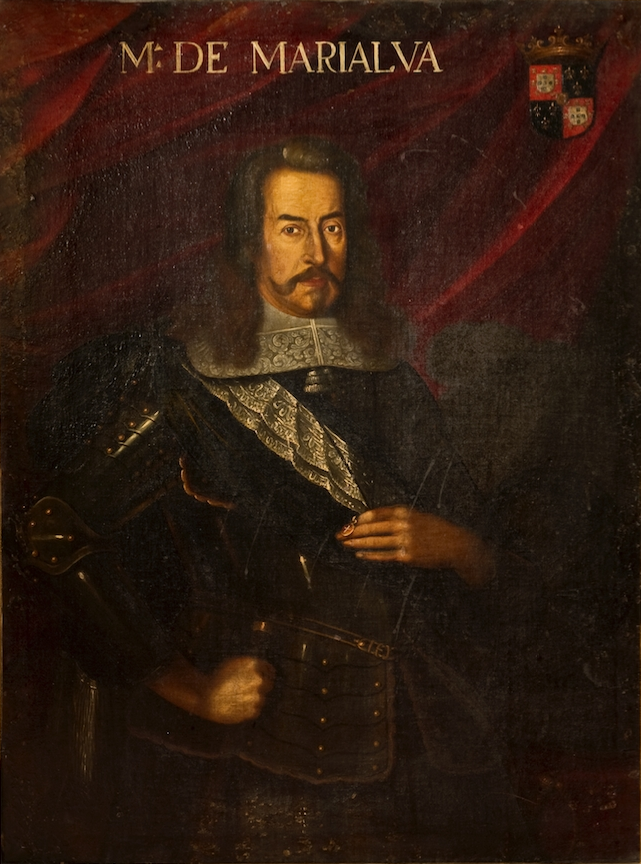
Portrait of the Marquis of Marialva by Feliciano de Almeida, c. 1673–1675

In December 1658 a Spanish army commanded by D. Grandee Luis de Haro camped in the frontier of the Caia River with 14,000 infantry, 3,500 cavalry, and several pieces of artillery. The Spanish preparation for the siege of Elvas took several days, time which the Portuguese used to further prepare the city defenses and call for aid. De Haro distributed his troops in trenches, giving orders to kill everyone that approached the city, and prepared his army to confront the relief force the Portuguese would inevitably send. The Spanish bombarded the city, causing panic and casualties among the civil population, while disease claimed 300 lives a day inside the walls. The siege would persist for several weeks. The only way the situation could turn in favor of the Portuguese was with the help of a relief army. Queen-Mother Luisa de Guzman decided to call for António Luís de Meneses, Count of Cantanhede, and gave him the command of all Portuguese troops in Alentejo. She also transferred to the same theater of operations Sancho Manoel de Vilhena, who assumed the post of field marshal.

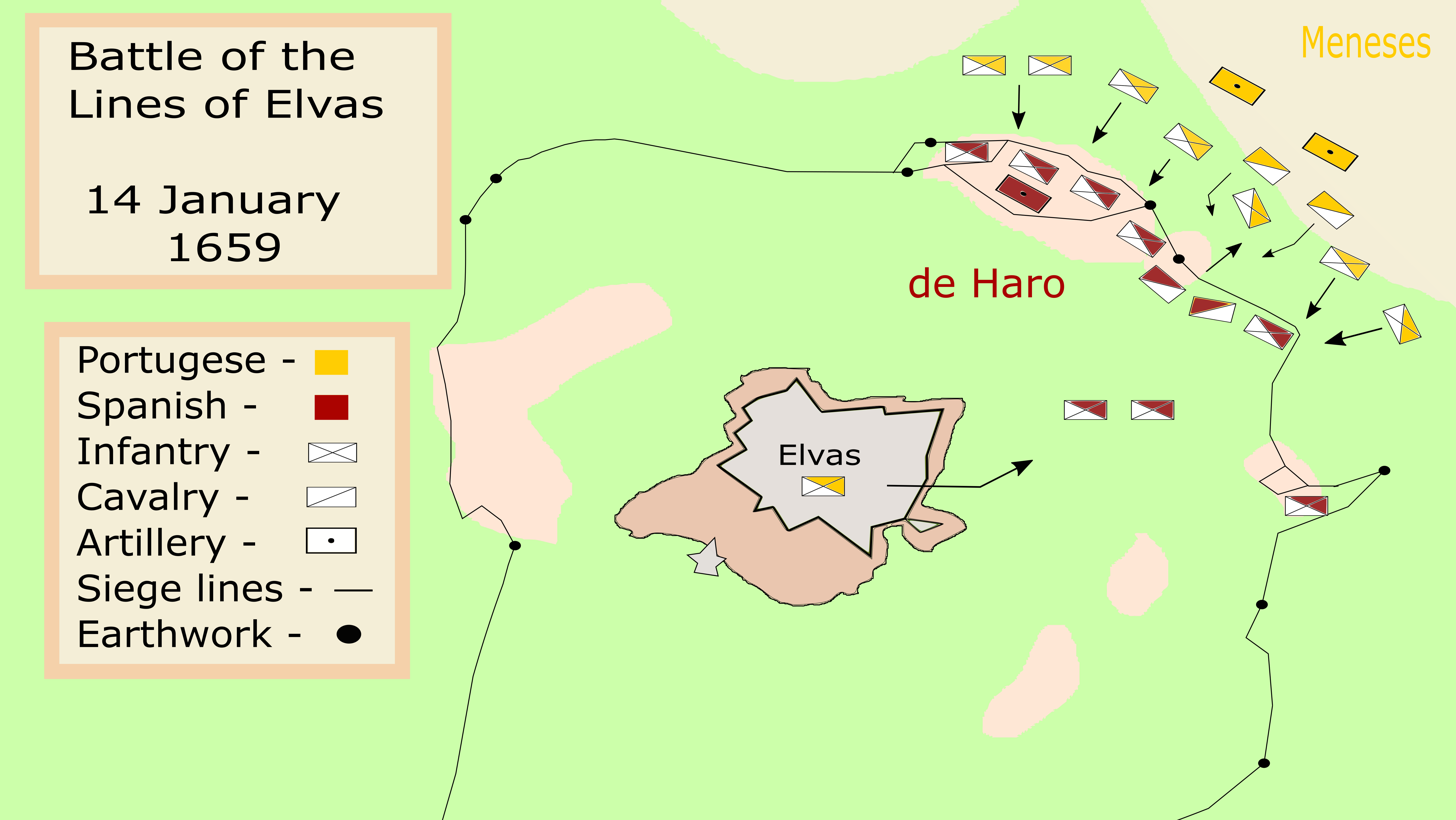
Plan of the battle

Meneses, although facing extremely poor logistical conditions, gathered an army in Estremoz. He organized recruitment efforts in Viseu and in the Madeira islands and united the garrisons of Borba, Juromenha, Campo Maior, Vila Viçosa, Monforte, and Arronches into a single army. The gathered army had 8,000 infantry, 2,500 cavalry, and seven cannon. The Portuguese cavalry were notably led by General André de Albuquerque Ribafria, who was considered the most capable commander of the war and credited with reforming the Portuguese cavalry into an elite force. The Portuguese army left Estremoz in early January, marching to the east towards the besieged city. Rather than take the flatter main road between Estremoz and Elvas, the Portuguese instead moved to the north and east of the city. On the night of 16 January the army arrived and occupied the hills to the northeast of Elvas, from where they could see the city and the enemy lines.

== Battle ==
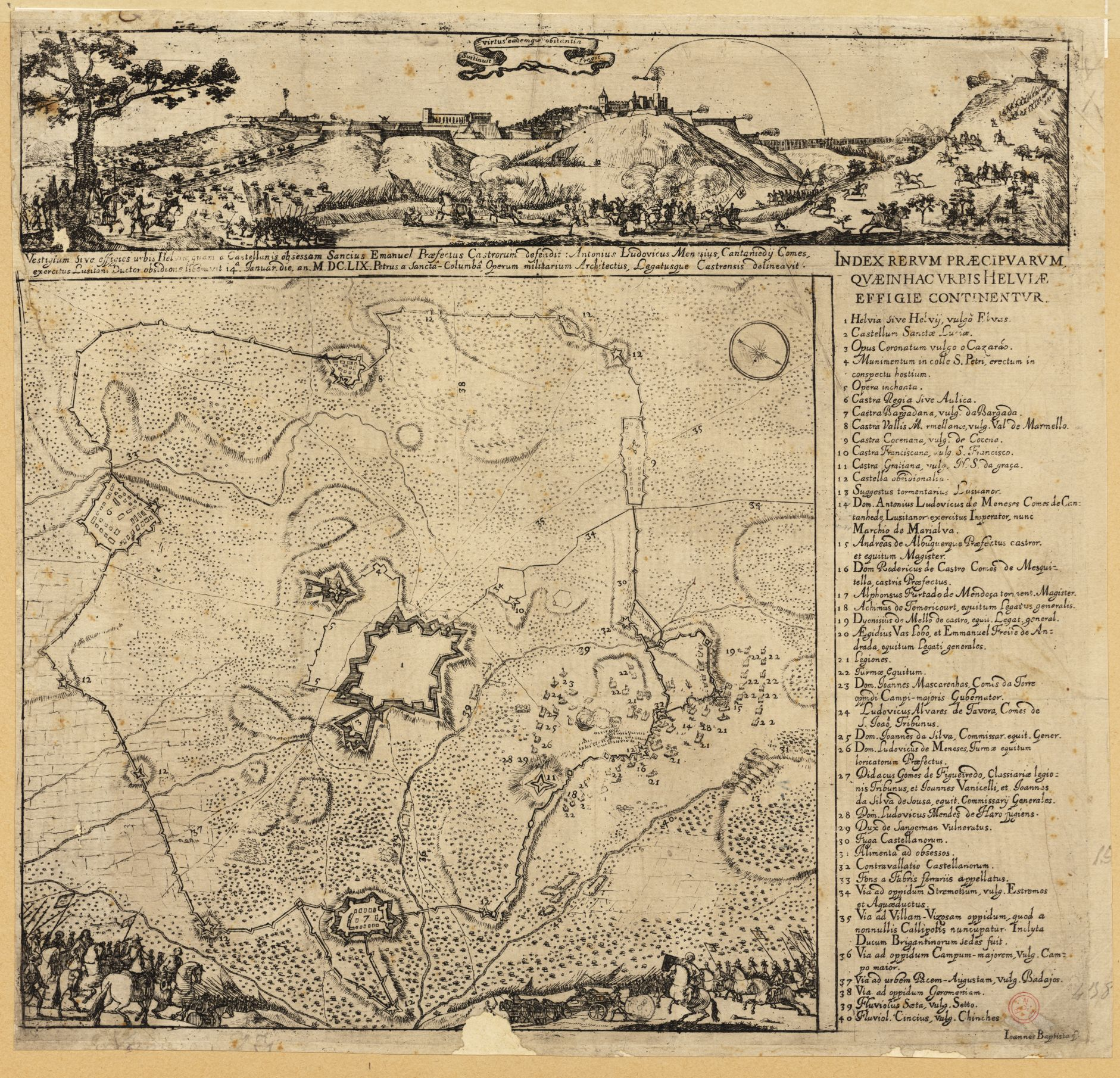
Vestigium sive effigies urbis Helviæ..., 1662 plan of the battle by João Batista

On 17 January, around 8 o'clock in the morning, the Portuguese army occupied the hill of Assomada and from there began to advance on the Spanish siege lines. The advancing forces were shrouded by a thick fog as they moved into the valley in front of the Spanish lines. Around 8 o'clock in the morning, the Portuguese attacked the Spanish army near the village of Murtais (possibly by a stream of the same name), where the Portuguese infantry fought with such ferocity that the Spanish were driven from that segment of their trenches. When the Spanish cavalry moved to intervene, the Portuguese cannon fired into them. Using his infantry in conjunction with his artillery, Meneses was able to stall several Spanish cavalry charges.

The Portuguese cavalry was then ordered to counter-charge the retreating Spanish cavalry, and, despite the superior Spanish numbers, routed them. This victory was in no small part due to the personal initiative and leadership of General Ribafria, who was keen on crushing the Spanish cavalry while they were on the defensive. With these early actions won, Meneses divided his army, drawing up one part to attack the Spanish trenches while sending the other around the Spanish army's right flank. Having lost most of his cavalry, De Haro was left unaware of this movement. From his position on Assomada hill, Meneses then signaled the Elvas garrison to sally forth from their defenses and join the attack. Meanwhile, De Haro continued to conduct a pitched defensive battle centered on his static trench line, and failed to deal with the encircling Portuguese forces. By mid afternoon the Spanish were valiantly defending their lines, but after some time Meneses's dual flanking maneuver began to wear down the defenders, who were now under attack from multiple directions.

De Haro abandoned his strategy too late in the day, and the Spanish lines eventual broke, with thousands of soldiers fleeing in panic. Meneses wasted no time in his pursuit of the Spanish, and harried them for the next three days as they retreated across the border to Badajoz. Many Spaniards became trapped against the Caia river and were forced to surrender. The rout was so total that the Spanish artillerymen were unable to spike (disable) their cannons before the Portuguese captured them, and Cantanhede came into possession of 22 assorted artillery pieces among other loot.

Spanish casualties were heavy; Of the 17,500 men commanded by De Haro, only 5,000 infantry and 1,300 cavalry managed to reach Badajoz. The Portuguese suffered some 200 killed and 700 wounded. The most notable Portuguese casualty was Ribafria, who was killed while leading an assault on a hard point in the Spanish trenches.

After his success in the battle, Meneses, Count of Cantanhede, received among several honours the title of Marquis of Marialva on 11 June 1661. Six years later at the Battle of Montes Claros, Meneses used a strategy similar to the one he used at the Battle of the Lines to repulse a similar Spanish cavalry charge.

A commemorative monument stands on the site of the battlefield. The Garrison Border Town of Elvas and its Fortifications were declared a World Heritage Site in 2012.

== Pictures ==
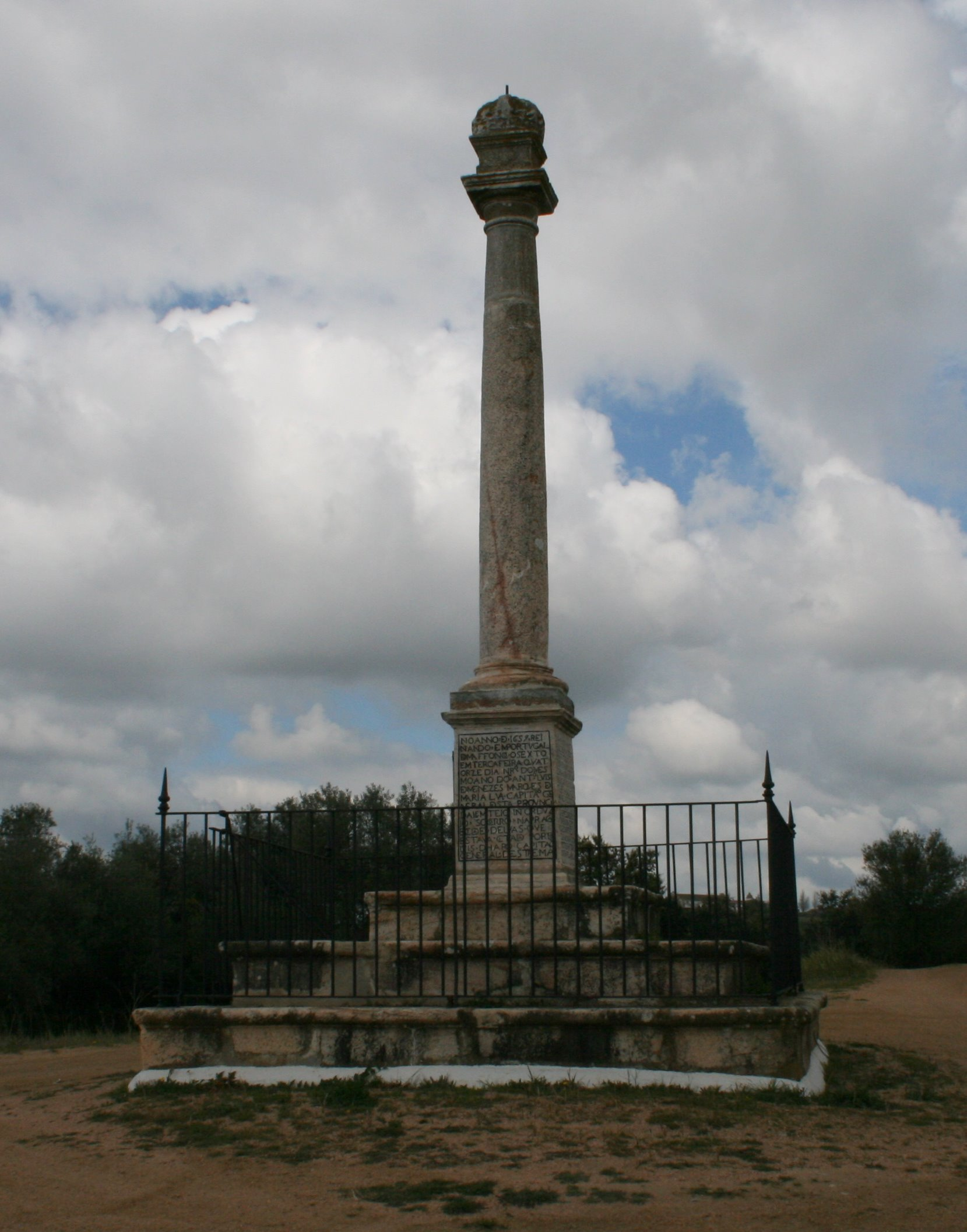

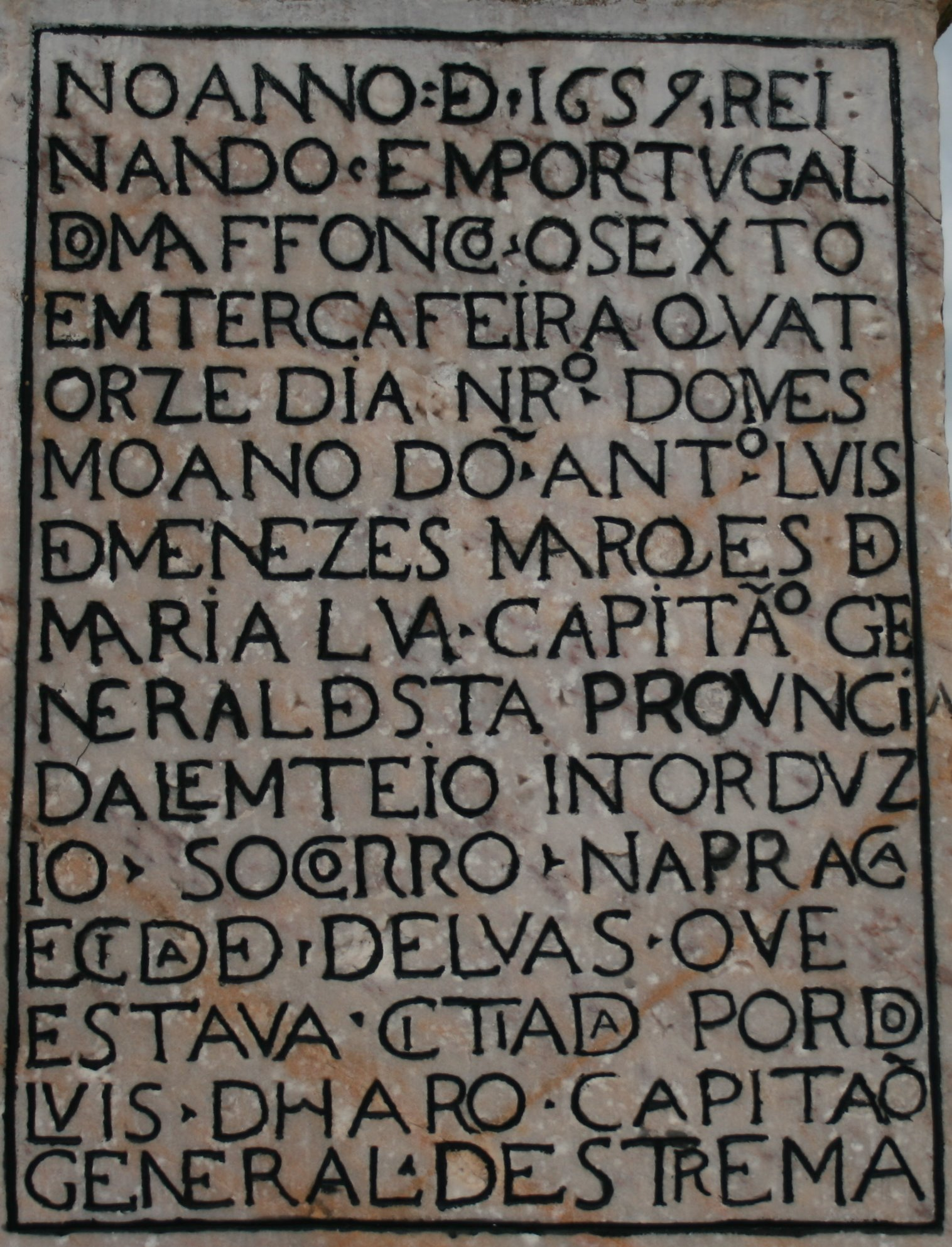

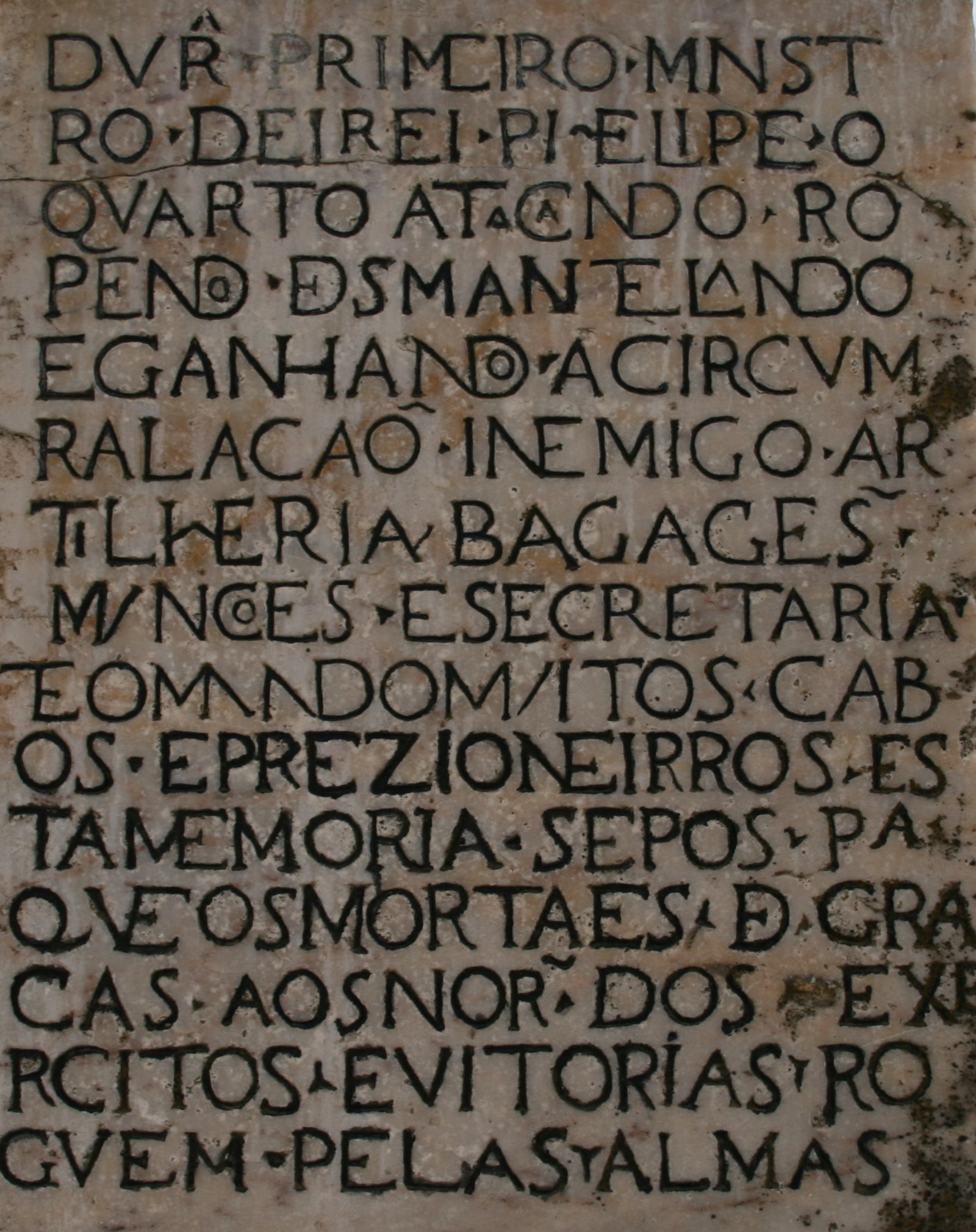

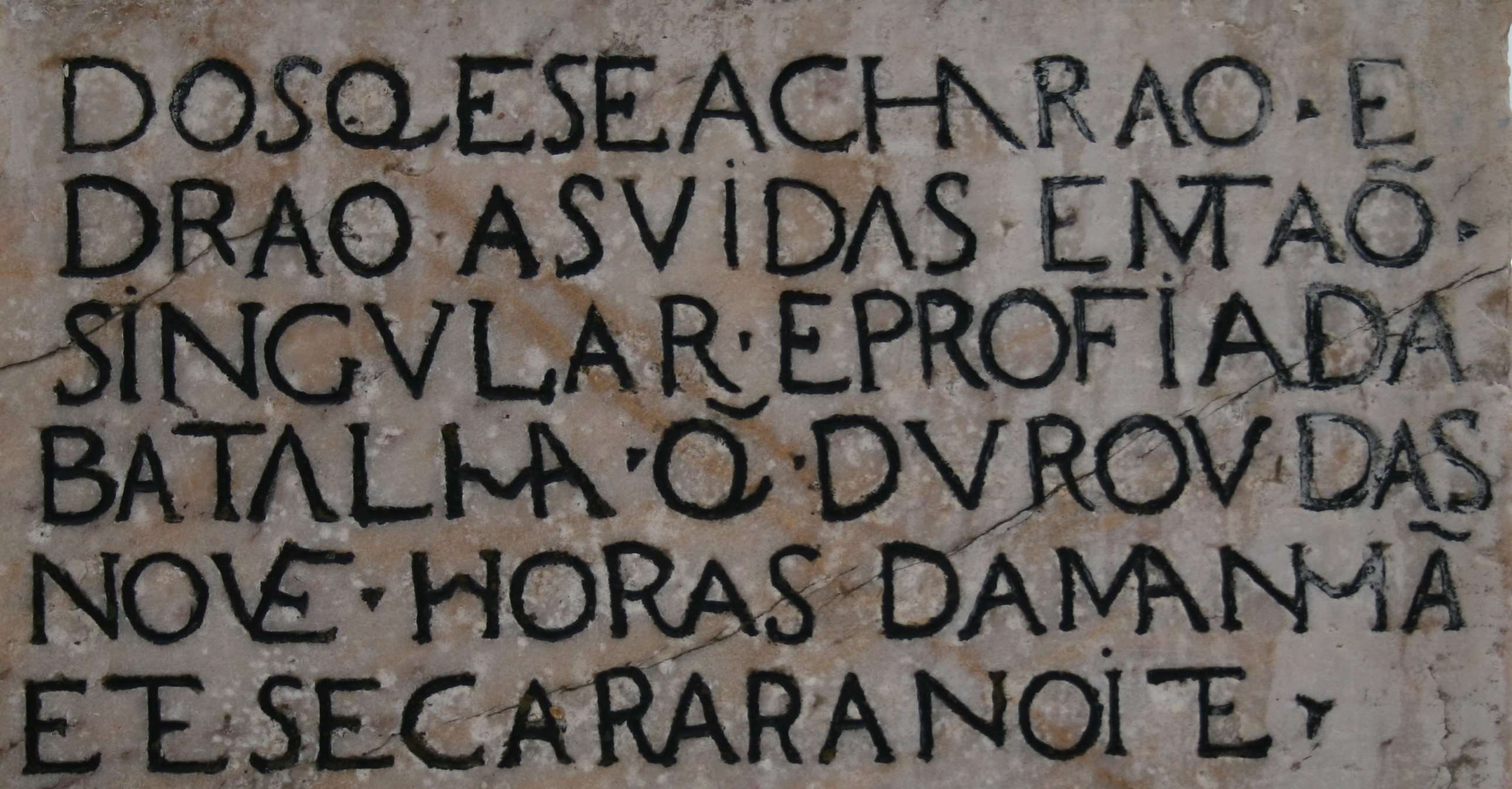

== Sources ==
- Conde da Ericeira, Luis de Menezes (1751). Historia de Portugal Restaurado; 1657-1662 (in Portuguese).
- Jacques, Tony (2007). Dictionary of Battles and Sieges: A Guide to 8,500 Battles from Antiquity through the Twenty-first Century, Volume 1, A-E. Greenwood. ISBN 978-0-313-33537-2.
- Ribeiro, Ângelo (2004). História de Portugal: A Restauração da Independência-O Início da Dinastia de Bragança (in Portuguese). ISBN 989-554-110-4.
- Stearns, Peter N; Langer, William Leonard (1960). The Encyclopedia of World history: ancient, medieval, and modern, chronologically arranged (2001 ed.). Houghton Mifflin Harcourt. ISBN 978-0395652374.
- White, Lorraine (2002). "The Experience of Spain's Early Modern Soldiers: Combat, Welfare and Violence". War in History. 9 (1): 1–38. doi:10.1191/0968344502wh248oa. JSTOR 26014120. PMID 20191681. S2CID 2651000.
