= Elvas =

- Municipality
- City of Elvas
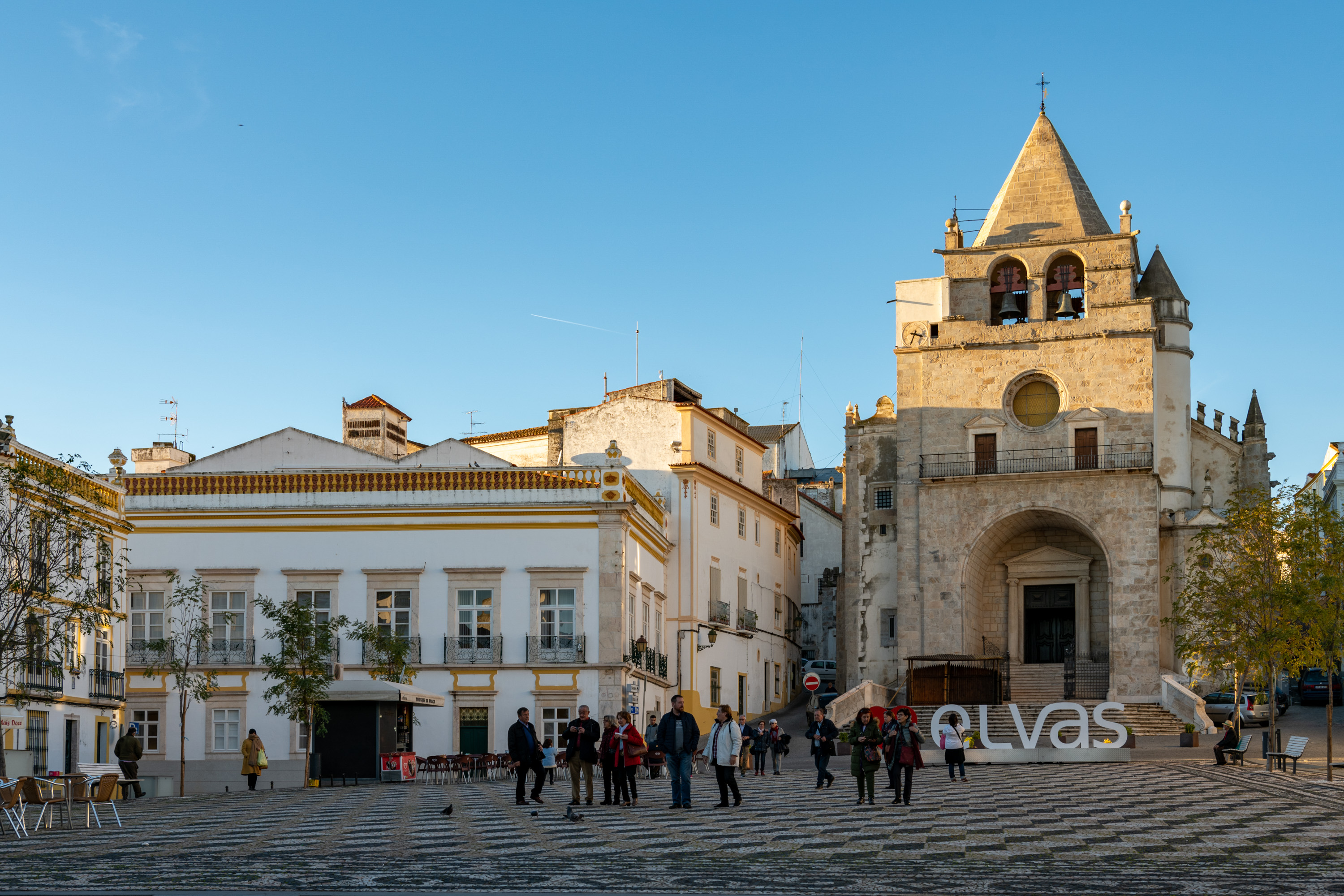
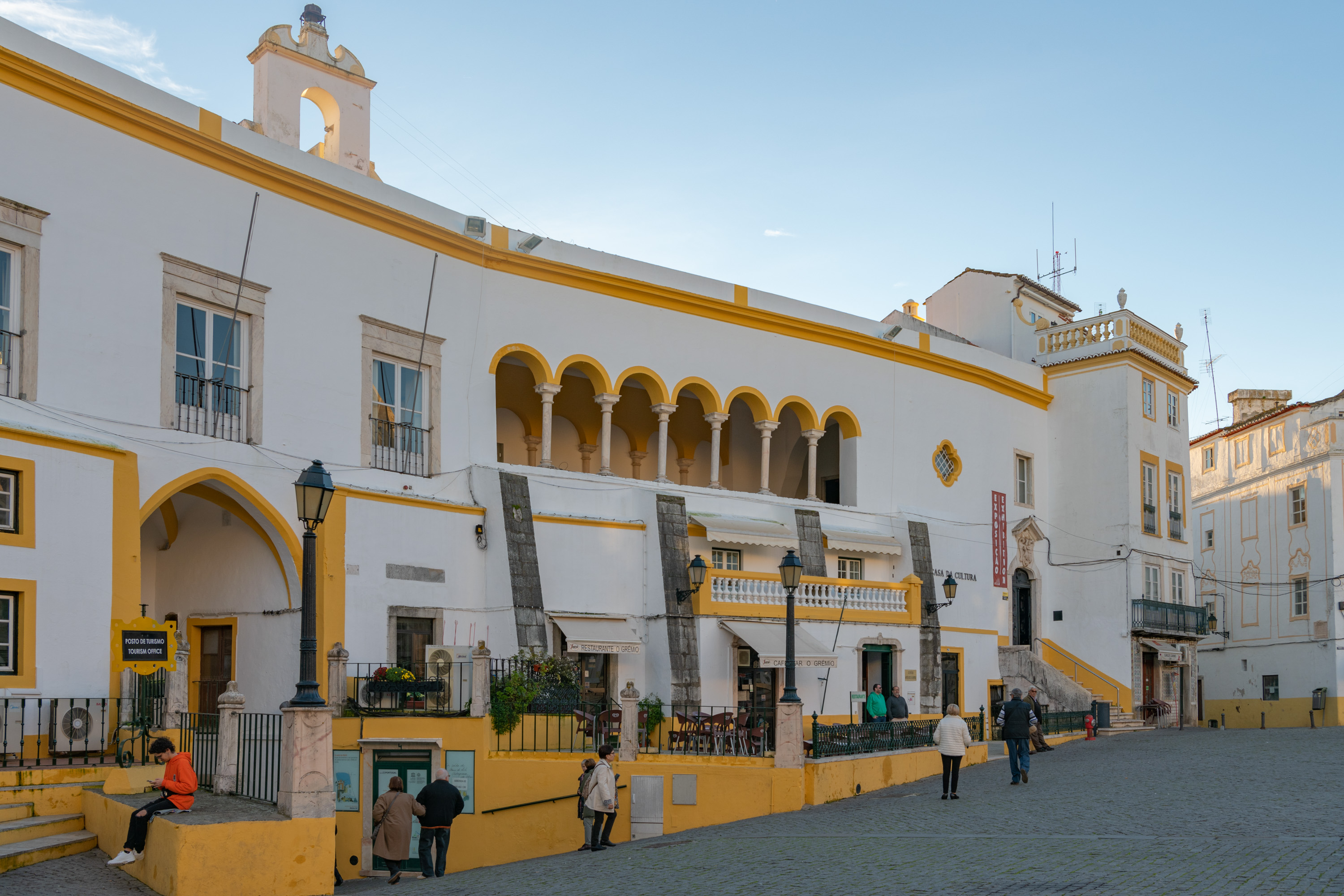
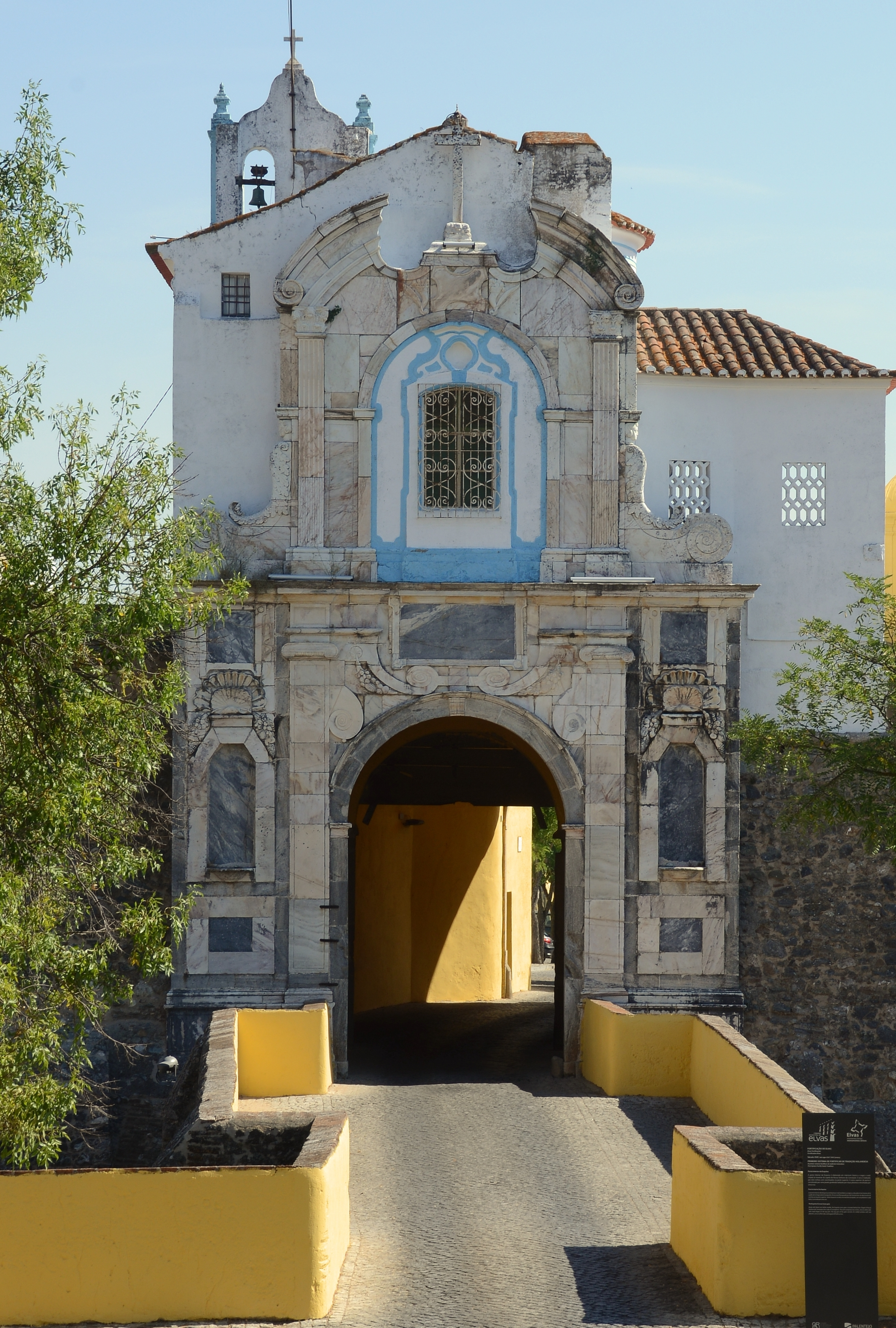
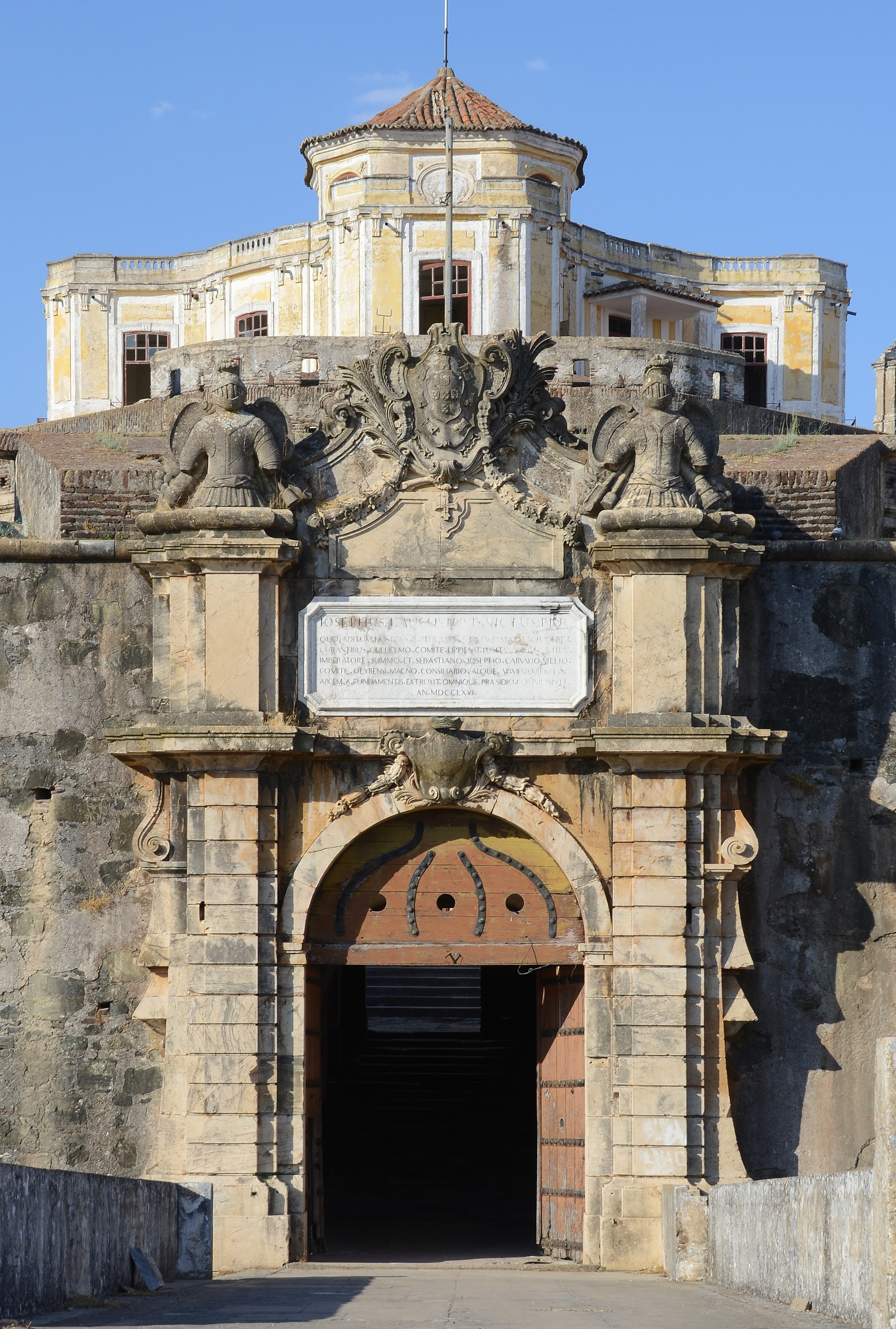
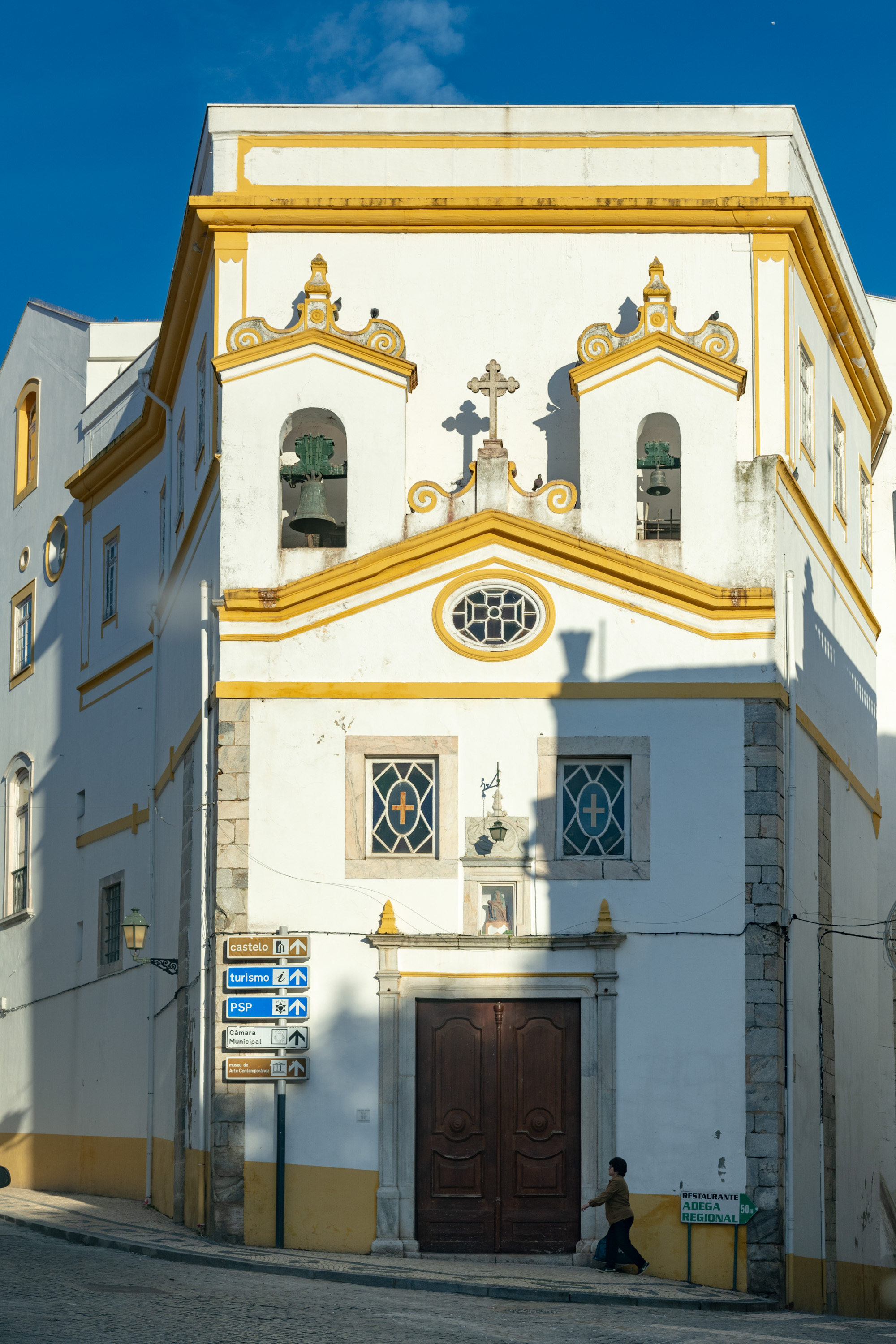
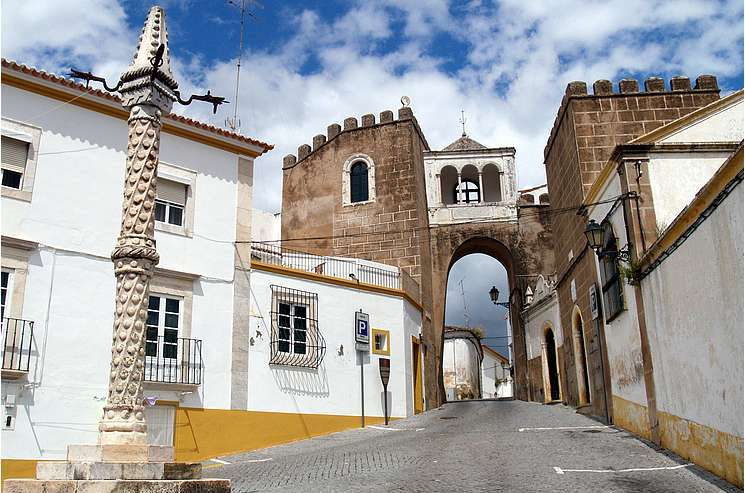
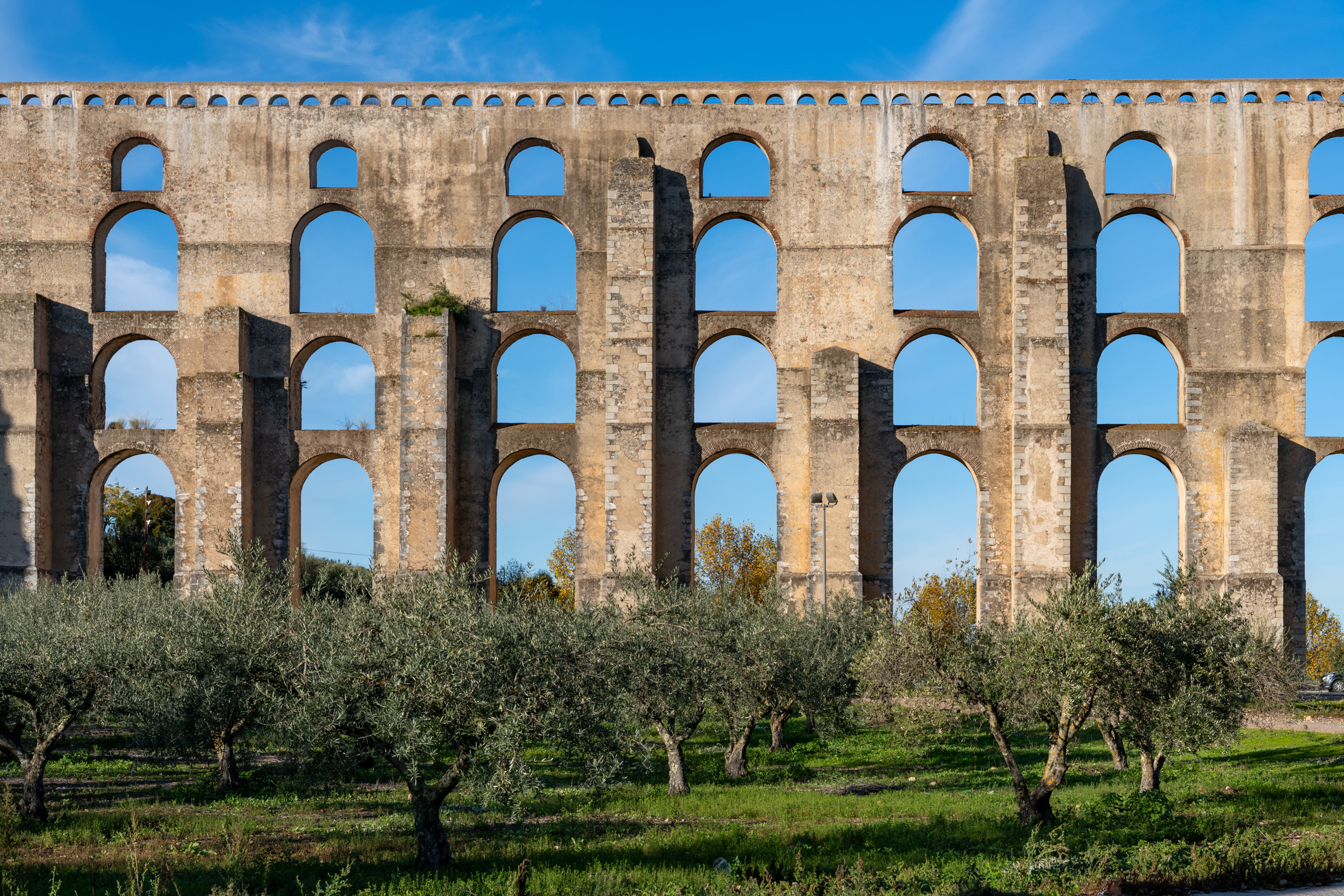

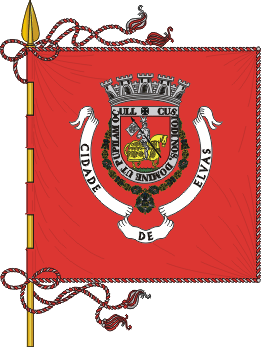
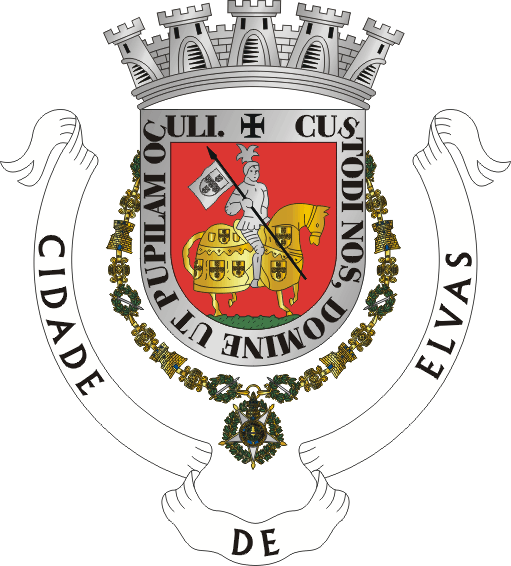
- Flag Coat of arms
- Interactive map of Elvas
- Location in Portugal
- Coordinates: 38°52′N 7°09′W
- Country: Portugal
- Region: Alentejo
- Intermunic. comm.: Alto Alentejo
- District: Portalegre
- Parishes: 7

Government
  - President: Rondão Almeida (Independent)

Area
  - Total: 631.29 km^{2} (243.74 sq mi)

Population (2011)
  - Total: 23,078
  - Density: 36.557/km^{2} (94.682/sq mi)
- Time zone: UTC+00:00 (WET)
  - Summer (DST): UTC+01:00 (WEST)
- Local holiday: January 14
- Website: http://www.cm-elvas.pt

UNESCO World Heritage Site
- Official name: Garrison Border Town of Elvas and its Fortifications
- Criteria: Cultural: iv
- Reference: 1367
- Inscription: 2012 (36th Session)
- Area: 179.356 ha (443.20 acres)

Elvas (Portuguese pronunciation: [ˈɛlvɐʃ]), officially the City of Elvas (Portuguese: Cidade de Elvas), is a Portuguese municipality, former episcopal city and frontier fortress of easternmost central Portugal, located in the district of Portalegre in Alentejo. It is situated about 200 kilometres (120 mi) east of Lisbon, and about 8 kilometres (5.0 mi) west of the Spanish fortress of Badajoz, by the Madrid-Badajoz-Lisbon railway. The municipality population as of 2011 was 23,078, in an area of 631.29 square kilometres (243.74 sq mi). The city itself had a population of 16,640 as of 2011.

Elvas is among the finest examples of intensive usage of the trace italienne (star fort) in military architecture, and including is old town, has been a World Heritage Site since 30 June 2012.

== History ==
Elvas lies on a hill 8 kilometres (5.0 mi) northwest of the Guadiana river. The Amoreira Aqueduct, 6 kilometres (3.7 mi) long, supplies the city with clean water; it was begun early in the 15th century and completed in 1622. For some distance it includes four tiers of superimposed arches, with a total height of 40 metres (130 ft).

The city was wrested from the Moors by Afonso I of Portugal in 1166 but was temporarily recaptured before its final occupation by the Portuguese in 1226. In 1570 it became an episcopal see, the Roman Catholic Diocese of Elvas, until 1818. The late Gothic Our Lady of the Assumption Cathedral, which has many traces of Moorish influence in its architecture, dates from the reign of Manuel I of Portugal (1495–1521).

It was defended by seven bastions and the two forts of Santa Luzia and the Nossa Senhora da Graça Fort. From 1642 it was the chief frontier fortress south of the Tagus, which withstood sieges by the Spanish in 1659, 1711, and 1801. Elvas was the site of the Battle of the Lines of Elvas in 1659, during which the garrison and citizens of the city assisted in the rout of a Spanish Army. The Napoleonic French under Marshal Junot took it in March 1808 during the Peninsular War, but evacuated it in August after the conclusion of the Convention of Sintra. The fortress of Campo Maior 15 kilometres (9.3 mi) to the northeast is known for its Napoleonic era siege by the French and relief by the British under Marshal Beresford in 1811, an exploit commemorated in a ballad by Sir Walter Scott.

== UNESCO World Heritage site ==
Elvas
UNESCO World Heritage Site
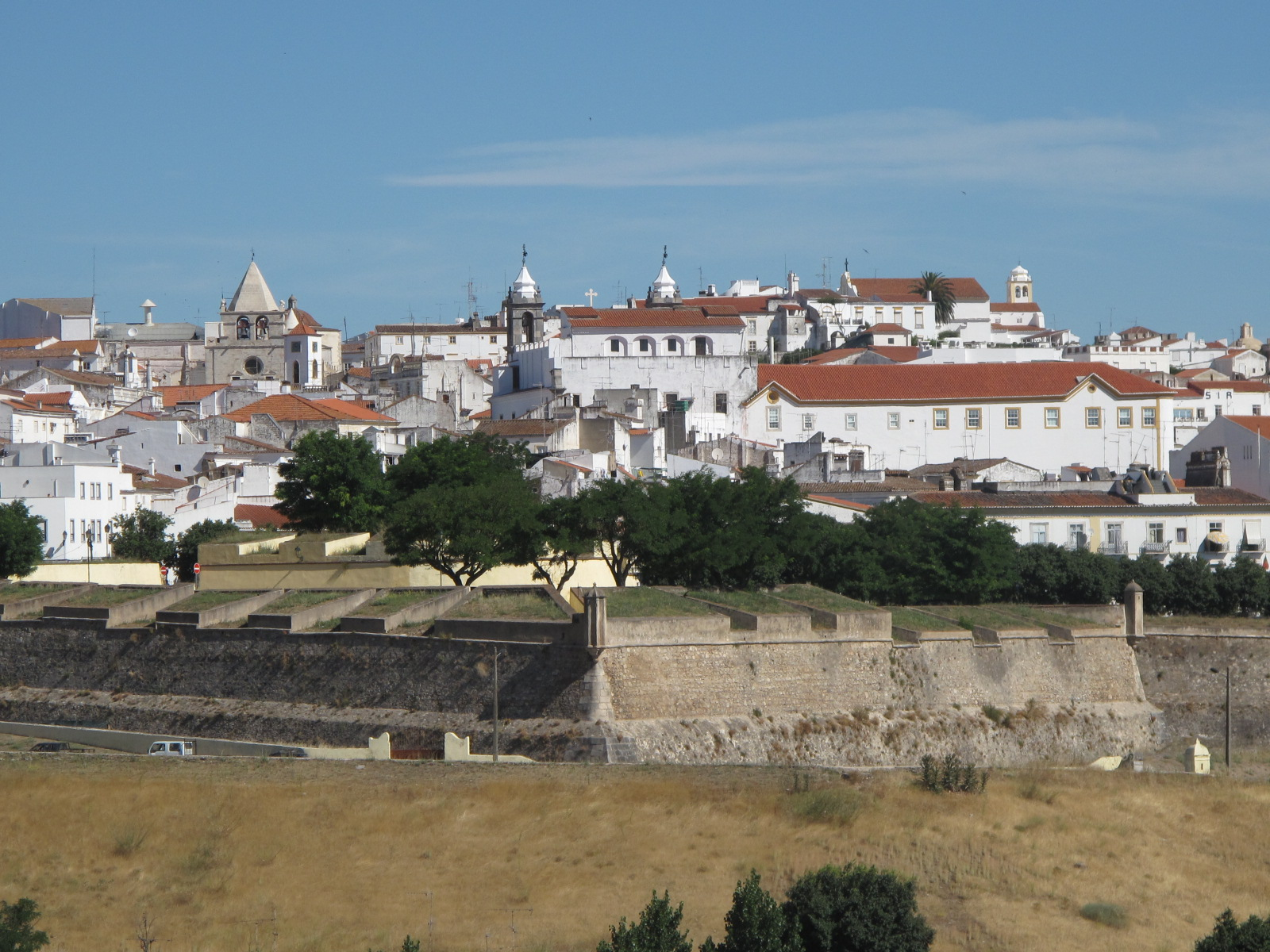
- Walls and fortifications of Elvas
- Interactive map of Elvas
- Official name: Garrison Border Town of Elvas and its Fortifications
- Location: Elvas, Portalegre District, Alentejo, Portugal
- Criteria: Cultural: (iv)
- Reference: 1367bis
- Inscription: 2012 (36th Session)
- Extensions: 2013
- Area: 179.356 ha (443.20 acres)
- Buffer zone: 690 ha (1,700 acres)
- Coordinates: 38°52′50.23″N 7°9′47.96″W

The Garrison Border Town of Elvas and its Fortifications were added to the list of UNESCO World Heritage Sites in 2012.

The site, extensively fortified from the 17th to 19th centuries, represents the largest bulwarked dry ditch system in the world. Within its walls, the town contains barracks and other military buildings as well as churches and monasteries. While Elvas contains remains dating back to the 10th century, its fortification began during the Portuguese Restoration War. The fortifications played a major role in the Battle of the Lines of Elvas in 1659. The fortifications were designed by Dutch Jesuit Padre João Piscásio Cosmander and represent the best surviving example of the Dutch school of fortifications anywhere. The site consists the following:

1. Amoreira Aqueduct, built to withstand long sieges.
2. Historic Centre
3. Fort of Santa Luzia and the covered way
4. Nossa Senhora da Graça Fort
5. Fortlet of São Mamede
6. Fortlet of São Pedro
7. Fortlet of São Domingos

== Climate ==
Elvas has a hot summer mediterranean climate (Köppen climate classification: Csa) with mild winters, although occasionally temperatures may drop below 0 °C (32 °F) and very hot, dry summers, where temperatures occasionally exceed 40 °C (104 °F). Elvas climate is quite similar to that of Badajoz, being slightly cooler and more humid due to its higher altitude and greater influence from the Atlantic Ocean. Precipitation varies from 500 to 600 mm (20 to 24 in) throughout the year, with an average of about 534 mm (21.0 in) annually. It is one of the hottest cities in Portugal during the summer, with an average maximum temperature close to 35 °C (95 °F).

Climate data for Elvas, (1991-2020 normals), extremes (1981-present)
Month	Jan	Feb	Mar	Apr	May	Jun	Jul	Aug	Sep	Oct	Nov	Dec	Year
Record high °C (°F)	22.6 (72.7)	24.1 (75.4)	30.8 (87.4)	35.3 (95.5)	39.4 (102.9)	43.2 (109.8)	45.8 (114.4)	45.1 (113.2)	43.5 (110.3)	36.1 (97.0)	29.2 (84.6)	22.0 (71.6)	45.8 (114.4)
Mean daily maximum °C (°F)	13.9 (57.0)	15.9 (60.6)	19.2 (66.6)	21.6 (70.9)	26.0 (78.8)	31.2 (88.2)	34.8 (94.6)	34.6 (94.3)	30.1 (86.2)	24.2 (75.6)	17.9 (64.2)	14.5 (58.1)	23.7 (74.6)
Daily mean °C (°F)	9.0 (48.2)	10.3 (50.5)	13.2 (55.8)	15.2 (59.4)	18.9 (66.0)	23.1 (73.6)	25.8 (78.4)	25.9 (78.6)	22.7 (72.9)	18.2 (64.8)	12.9 (55.2)	9.9 (49.8)	17.1 (62.8)
Mean daily minimum °C (°F)	4.1 (39.4)	4.7 (40.5)	7.1 (44.8)	8.8 (47.8)	11.8 (53.2)	15.0 (59.0)	16.8 (62.2)	17.1 (62.8)	15.2 (59.4)	12.3 (54.1)	8.0 (46.4)	5.3 (41.5)	10.5 (50.9)
Record low °C (°F)	−7.0 (19.4)	−5.0 (23.0)	−2.0 (28.4)	−1.5 (29.3)	1.5 (34.7)	6.0 (42.8)	9.7 (49.5)	8.0 (46.4)	4.0 (39.2)	−1.0 (30.2)	−4.5 (23.9)	−5.5 (22.1)	−7.0 (19.4)
Average precipitation mm (inches)	56.7 (2.23)	48.9 (1.93)	54.2 (2.13)	53.4 (2.10)	41.6 (1.64)	16.8 (0.66)	1.9 (0.07)	5.3 (0.21)	24.6 (0.97)	76.7 (3.02)	81.0 (3.19)	73.3 (2.89)	534.4 (21.04)
Average precipitation days (≥ 1 mm)	7.4	6.3	7.0	7.3	5.5	1.9	0.5	0.9	3.2	7.2	7.9	7.6	62.7
Mean monthly sunshine hours	154.3	161.8	212.1	224.6	275.4	316.2	366.6	339.2	252.2	198.6	164.8	129.4	2,795.2
Source: Instituto de Meteorologia (Sunshine 1971-2000)

Climate data for Vila Fernando, 1971-2000 normals and extremes, elevation: 360 m (1,180 ft)
Month	Jan	Feb	Mar	Apr	May	Jun	Jul	Aug	Sep	Oct	Nov	Dec	Year
Record high °C (°F)	20.0 (68.0)	22.6 (72.7)	27.5 (81.5)	31.0 (87.8)	34.5 (94.1)	42.0 (107.6)	42.5 (108.5)	40.6 (105.1)	41.2 (106.2)	33.6 (92.5)	26.5 (79.7)	22.5 (72.5)	42.5 (108.5)
Mean daily maximum °C (°F)	12.2 (54.0)	13.8 (56.8)	16.7 (62.1)	18.3 (64.9)	22.3 (72.1)	27.8 (82.0)	32.0 (89.6)	31.8 (89.2)	28.1 (82.6)	21.7 (71.1)	16.3 (61.3)	13.1 (55.6)	21.2 (70.1)
Daily mean °C (°F)	8.4 (47.1)	9.7 (49.5)	11.7 (53.1)	13.0 (55.4)	16.2 (61.2)	20.6 (69.1)	23.9 (75.0)	23.6 (74.5)	21.4 (70.5)	16.6 (61.9)	12.2 (54.0)	9.6 (49.3)	15.6 (60.0)
Mean daily minimum °C (°F)	4.7 (40.5)	5.6 (42.1)	6.7 (44.1)	7.7 (45.9)	10.1 (50.2)	13.3 (55.9)	15.7 (60.3)	15.5 (59.9)	14.6 (58.3)	11.5 (52.7)	8.1 (46.6)	6.0 (42.8)	10.0 (49.9)
Record low °C (°F)	−5.0 (23.0)	−5.0 (23.0)	−1.0 (30.2)	−1.0 (30.2)	2.0 (35.6)	6.0 (42.8)	9.0 (48.2)	8.0 (46.4)	4.0 (39.2)	1.5 (34.7)	−0.5 (31.1)	−3.0 (26.6)	−5.0 (23.0)
Average rainfall mm (inches)	64.3 (2.53)	54.6 (2.15)	41.7 (1.64)	54.0 (2.13)	39.2 (1.54)	23.2 (0.91)	7.6 (0.30)	4.5 (0.18)	23.8 (0.94)	58.6 (2.31)	72.9 (2.87)	88.2 (3.47)	532.6 (20.97)
Average precipitation days (≥ 0.1 mm)	11.0	9.2	7.6	9.1	7.1	4.0	1.5	1.0	3.9	8.2	9.3	10.1	82
Source: Instituto de Meteorologia

== Civil parishes ==
Administratively, the municipality is divided in seven civil parishes (freguesias):

- Assunção, Ajuda, Salvador e Santo Ildefonso
- Barbacena e Vila Fernando
- Caia, São Pedro e Alcáçova
- Santa Eulália
- São Brás e São Lourenço
- São Vicente e Ventosa
- Terrugem e Vila Boim

== Notable people ==
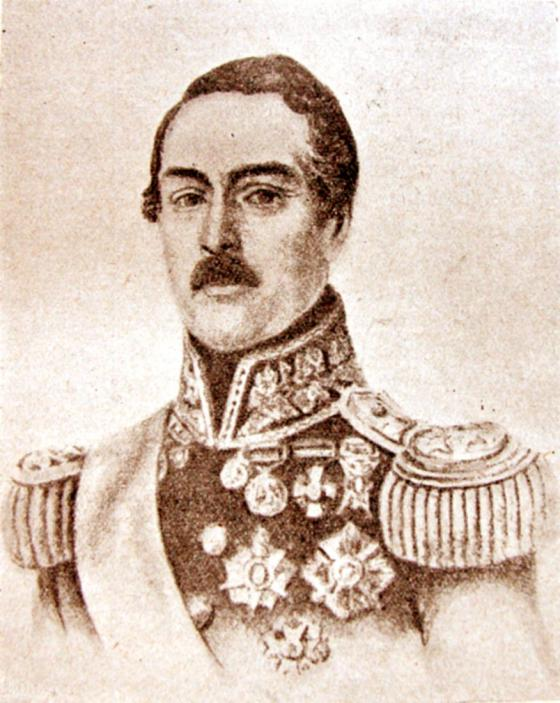
José Travassos Valdez, Conde de Bonfim, circa 1850

- Manuel Rodrigues Coelho (ca. 1555 – 1635) a Portuguese organist and composer.
- João de Fontes Pereira de Melo (1780–1856) a politician, a general and twice colonial governor of Cape Verde
- José Travassos Valdez, 1st Count of Bonfim (1787–1862) a Portuguese soldier and statesman.
- Fortunato José Barreiros (1797–1885) a colonial governor of Cape Verde and military architect.
- Adelaide Cabete (1867–1935) a Portuguese feminist and republican.
- Virgínia Quaresma (1882–1973) an early radical, feminist, lesbian journalist
- Sofia Pomba Guerra (1906–1976) a feminist, opponent of the Estado Novo government in Portugal and an activist in the anti-colonial movements of Mozambique and Guinea-Bissau.
- José António Rondão Almeida (born 1942) a Portuguese politician & Mayor of Elvas
- Toni Vidigal (born 1975), Jorge Vidigal (born 1978) & André Vidigal (born 1998) Angolan football brothers
- Raquel Guerra (born 1985) a Portuguese singer and actress.
- Henrique Sereno (born 1985) a Portuguese former footballer with 236 club caps

== Sister cities ==
- Badajoz, Extremadura, Spain
- Olivença, Disputed
- Campo Maior, Alentejo, Portugal
