= Vidigal =

Vidigal may refer to:

- Vidigal (favela) - A Rio de Janeiro favela

Vidigal is a surname, and may also refer to the following footballing brothers:

- Beto Vidigal, retired Angolan midfielder;
- Lito Vidigal, retired Angolan defender;
- José Luís Vidigal, retired Portuguese-Angolan midfielder;
- Toni Vidigal, retired Portuguese-Angolan midfielder;
- Jorge Filipe Vidigal, Portuguese-Angolan defender.
- Edson Vidigal, Brazilian politician and lawyer.
- Sandro Vidigal (born 2007), Portuguese footballer
