= South Zone (Rio de Janeiro) =

Area of Rio de Janeiro

Coordinates: 22.974199°S 43.199444°W

The South Zone (Portuguese: Zona Sul; Portuguese pronunciation: [ˈzonɐ ˈsuw]) is an area of the city of Rio de Janeiro situated between the Tijuca Massif, the Atlantic Ocean and Guanabara Bay. Most of it is made up of neighborhoods along the Atlantic coastline, such as São Conrado, Vidigal, Leblon, Ipanema, Copacabana, and Leme.

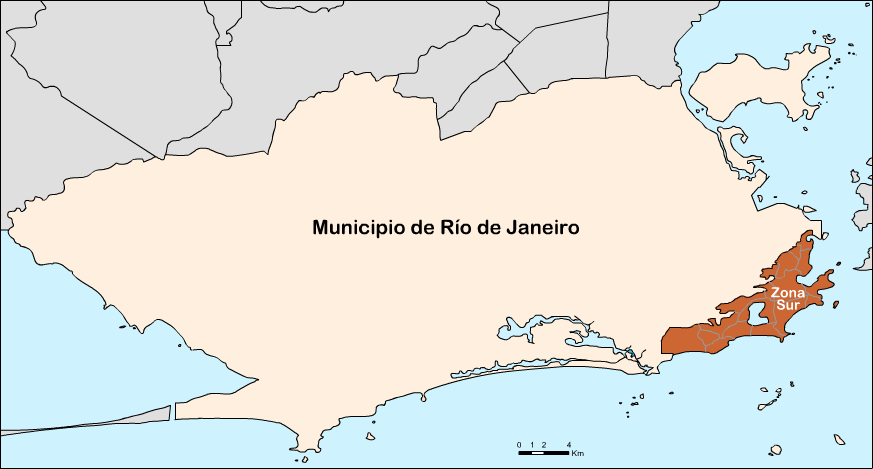
Location of the South Zone in the Municipality of Rio de Janeiro.

It also includes the neighborhoods of Urca, Botafogo, Flamengo and Glória, on Guanabara Bay, and Santa Teresa, Catete, Laranjeiras, Cosme Velho, Humaitá, Lagoa, Jardim Botânico and Gávea, bordering on Tijuca Forest to the West or North. Zona Sul includes a number of favelas, such as Rocinha, close to São Conrado, Vidigal, close to Leblon, Cantagalo and Ladeira dos Tabajaras, in Copacabana, and Morro Dona Marta, in Botafogo.

It is in this region that the majority of the city's balneario beaches and hotels are located, as are the Rodrigo de Freitas Lagoon, much of the Tijuca National Park, the Sugarloaf Mountain, with its cable car, the Corcovado hill, where the statue of Christ the Redeemer stands, and other natural wonders and tourist attractions. It is the richest region of the city and is visited by thousands of tourists from different parts of the world throughout the year.

== List of neighborhoods ==
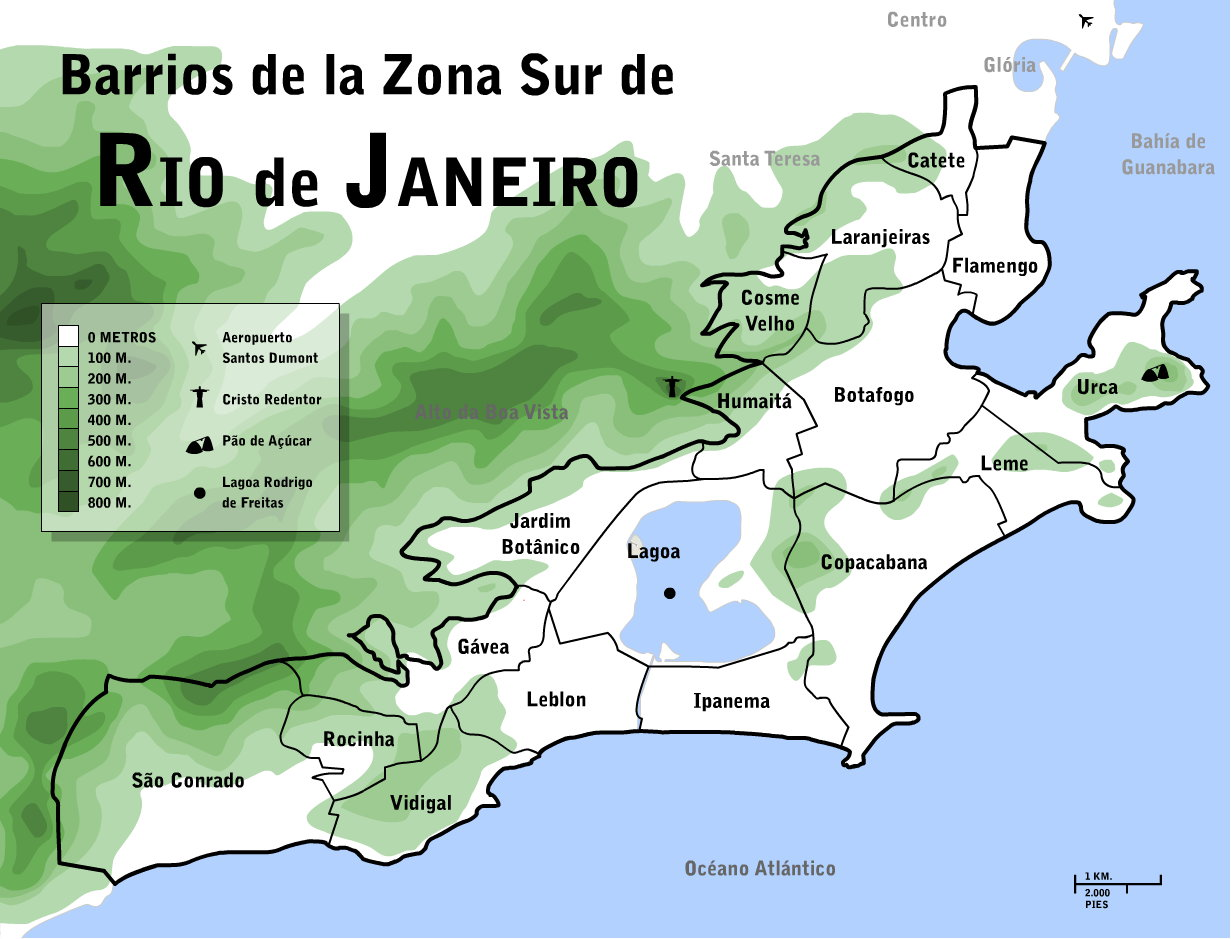
Neighborhoods of the South Zone.

- Botafogo
- Catete
- Copacabana
- Cosme Velho
- Flamengo
- Gávea
- Glória
- Humaitá
- Ipanema
- Jardim Botanico
- Lagoa
- Laranjeiras
- Leblon
- Leme
- Rocinha
- São Conrado
- Urca
- Vidigal
