= Urquiza (disambiguation) =

Justo José de Urquiza was an Argentine general and politician.

Urquiza, a Basque surname, may also refer to:

== Places ==
- General Urquiza, a village and municipality in Misiones Province, Argentina
- Villa Urquiza, a neighborhood of Buenos Aires
- Villa Urquiza, Entre Ríos, a town in Entre Ríos Province, Argentina
- Parque Urquiza (Rosario), a public urban park in Rosario, Argentina

== Transport ==
- Ferrocarril General Urquiza, a commuter train line in northeast Argentina
- General Justo José de Urquiza Airport, Paraná, Entre Ríos Province, Argentina
- Rua General Urquiza, Rio de Janeiro, Brazil

== Sports ==
- JJ Urquiza, a sports club sited in Loma Hermosa, Tres de Febrero, Greater Buenos Aires, Argentina
- UAI Urquiza, a sports club sited in Villa Lynch, General San Martín Partido, Greater Buenos Aires, Argentina

== People ==
- Manolo Urquiza (1920–1987), media personality in Cuba and Puerto Rico
- Nicolás Urquiza (born 1969), Argentine artist and designer

== Other ==
- 11711 Urquiza, main-belt asteroid
