= Fonte da Saudade =

Region in the South Zone of Rio de Janeiro, Brazil

Coordinates: 22°57′49″S 43°12′08″W

Fonte da Saudade is a region in the South Zone of Rio de Janeiro, which is not officially recognized as a neighbourhood. It is located in the neighborhood of Lagoa.
