= Humaitá, Rio de Janeiro =

Humaitá
- Neighborhood
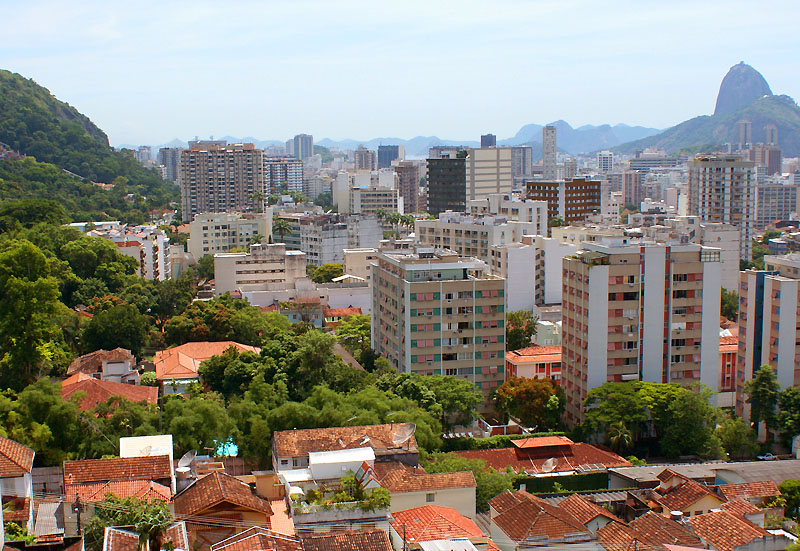

- Location in Rio de Janeiro Humaitá (Brazil)
- Coordinates: 22°57′22″S 43°12′10″W
- Country: Brazil
- State: Rio de Janeiro (RJ)
- Municipality/City: Rio de Janeiro
- Zone: South Zone
- Administrative Region: Botafogo

Area
  - Total: 105.45 ha (260.6 acres)

Population (2010)
  - Total: 13,285
  - Density: 12,598/km^{2} (32,630/sq mi)

Humaitá is a residential district in the South Zone of Rio de Janeiro, Brazil. It is situated between the foot of Corcovado Mountain and the Rodrigo de Freitas Lagoon. Neighbouring districts are Botafogo, Lagoa and Jardim Botânico.

The name of the district commemorates the Siege of Humaitá in southern Paraguay, fought during the Paraguayan War in August 1868.

In 1657, Father José Martins de Matos, Vicar of the Bishopric dedicated a chapel (then recently constructed, on the wooded lower slopes of Corcovado, a site at the end of the street now called Rua Viuva Lacerda) and opened the "Caminho Novo" (new path/way) to São Clemente (St. Clement). Nowadays this path has become a major thoroughfare, Rua São Clemente, which passes through Botafogo and Humaitá.

In September 2004 the Mayor of Rio de Janeiro created a "Polo Gastronômico" (Gastronomy Precinct) in the area bounded by the Streets São Clemente, Humaitá, Visconde Silva, Visconde de Caravelas, Pinheiro Guimarães, Real Grandeza, Mena Barreto, São João Batista and Voluntários da Pátria, all within Humaitá and neighbouring Botafogo.
