= Gávea =

- Neighborhood
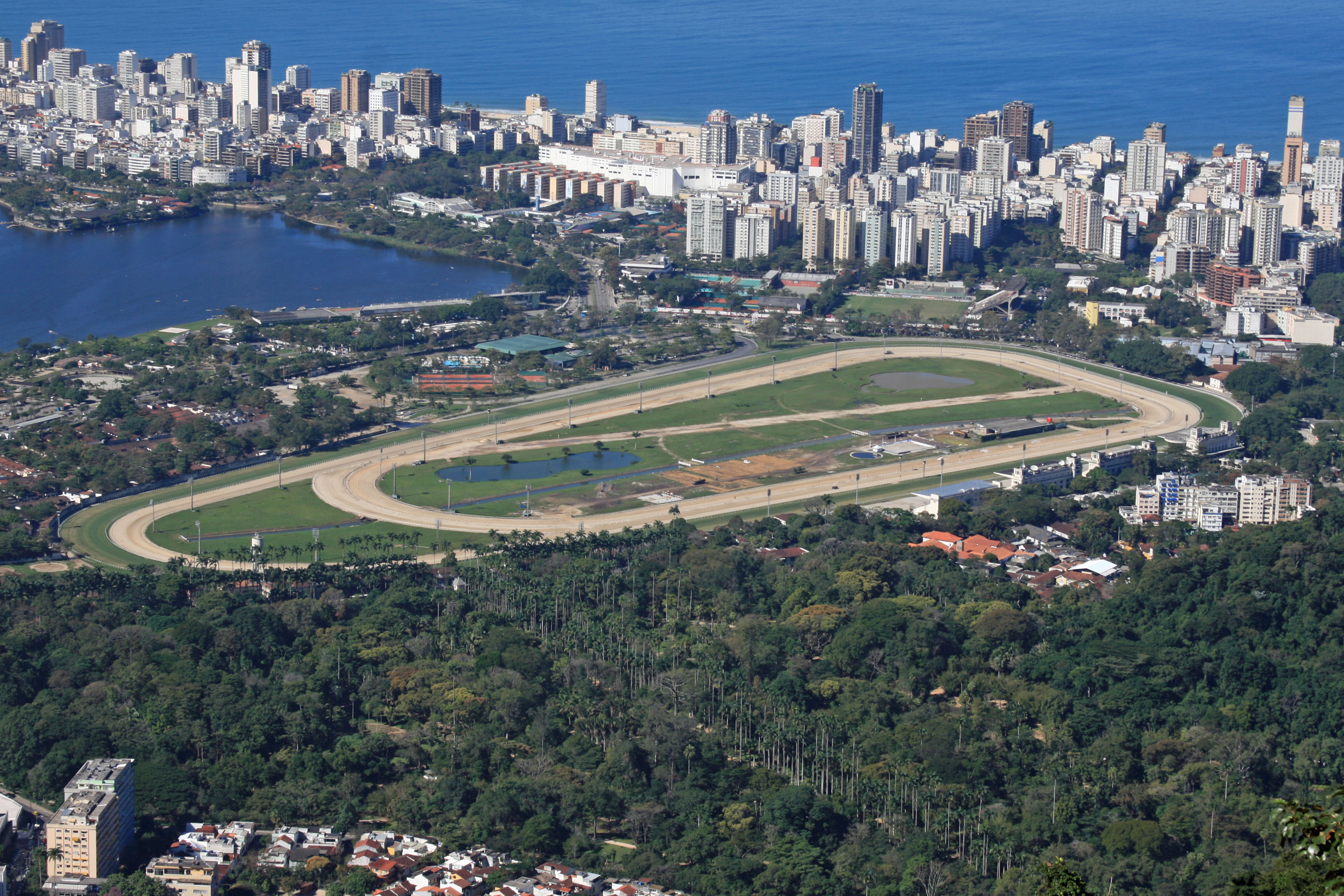
- The Hipódromo da Gávea

- Location in Rio de Janeiro Gávea (Brazil)
- Coordinates: 22°58′47″S 43°14′27″W
- Country: Brazil
- State: Rio de Janeiro (RJ)
- Municipality/City: Rio de Janeiro
- Zone: South Zone

Area
  - Total: 2.58 km^{2} (1.00 sq mi)

Population (2010)
  - Total: 17,415
  - Density: 6,750/km^{2} (17,500/sq mi)

Gávea is an affluent residential neighborhood located in the South Zone of the city of Rio de Janeiro, Brazil. It borders São Conrado, Leblon, Lagoa and Jardim Botânico neighborhoods and is famous for its high concentration of artists. PUC-Rio, as well as several schools, are located in the neighborhood. Gávea is well known because of the "Baixo Gávea" area, which is considered a Bohemian quarter.

The first Europeans to have lived in what would become the neighborhood were the French, who came to extract Brazilwood. On July 16, 1565, the neighbourhood was named Gávea for the first time, by Estácio de Sá.

== Etymology ==
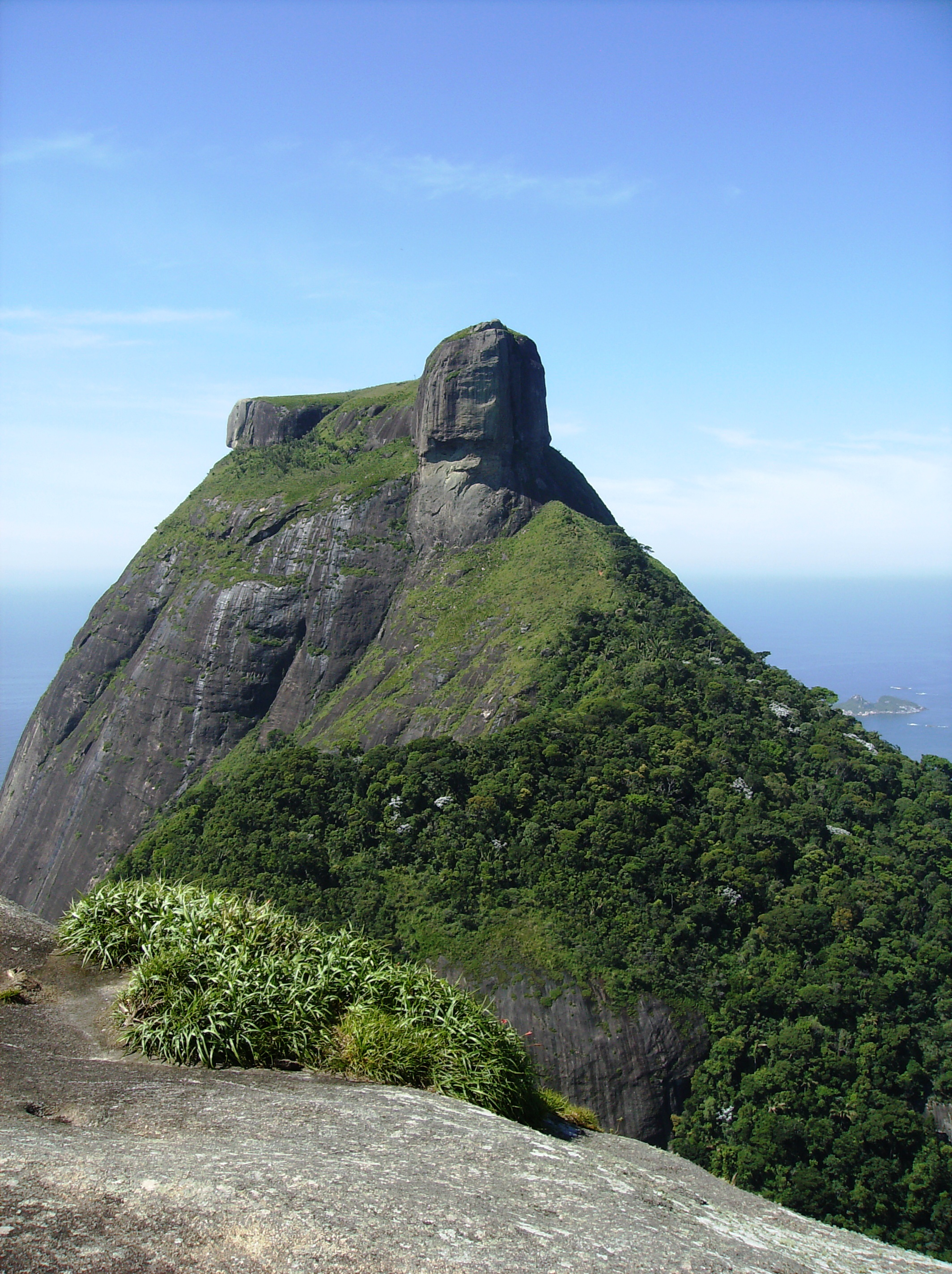
Pedra da Gávea, Rio de Janeiro

The neighborhood is named Gávea (which means topsail in Portuguese) because of an 852 m peak (Gávea Rock, or Pedra da Gávea) that resembles the topsail of the carrack, a sailing ship.

== Sports ==
The Hipódromo da Gávea is a horse racing venue located in the neighborhood. Estádio da Gávea the home of CR Flamengo football club, despite being named after the neighborhood, is located in the Lagoa neighborhood. Gávea was the site of a street circuit that hosted Grand Prix racing in the 1930s and 1940s.

== Notable people ==
- Yasmin Brunet, model
- Vinicius de Moraes, poet, diplomat, lyricist
