= André Vidigal =

Association football player

Personal information
- Full name: André Filipe Cunha Vidigal
- Date of birth: 17 August 1998 (age 28)
- Place of birth: Elvas, Portugal
- Height: 1.76 m (5 ft 9 in)
- Position: Winger

Team information
- Current team: Alverca
- Number: 7

Youth career
- 2007–2015: O Elvas
- 2015–2017: Académica

Senior career*
| Years | Team | Apps | (Gls) |
| 2017 | Académica | 6 | (0) |
| 2017 | → Fortuna Sittard (loan) | 13 | (7) |
| 2018–2021 | Fortuna Sittard | 26 | (5) |
| 2019–2020 | → APOEL (loan) | 22 | (2) |
| 2020–2021 | → Estoril (loan) | 32 | (6) |
| 2021–2023 | Marítimo | 65 | (9) |
| 2023–2026 | Stoke City | 39 | (6) |
| 2026 | Wycombe Wanderers | 13 | (2) |
| 2026– | Alverca | 3 | (0) |

International career^{‡}
| 2016 | Portugal U18 | 5 | (0) |
| 2017 | Portugal U19 | 2 | (0) |
| 2017 | Portugal U20 | 6 | (2) |
| 2018 | Portugal U21 | 1 | (0) |
| 2025– | Angola | 1 | (0) |
- * Club domestic league appearances and goals as of 5 September 2026 ‡ National team caps and goals as of 09:31, 26 March 2025 (UTC)

André Filipe Cunha Vidigal (born 17 August 1998) is a professional footballer who plays as a winger or forward for Primeira Liga club Alverca. Born in Portugal, he plays for the Angola national team.

Vidigal began his professional career with Académica before moving to Dutch club Fortuna Sittard in July 2017. After helping them gain promotion from the Eerste Divisie he moved on loan to Cypriot club APOEL and then returned to Portugal with Estoril in September 2020. After gaining promotion with Estoril, Vidigal signed for Primeira Liga club Marítimo in June 2021. Following Marítimo's relegation in 2022–23, Vidigal moved abroad again in July 2023, joining English EFL Championship club Stoke City. In 2026, he played for EFL League One side Wycombe Wanderers.

== Club career ==
=== Académica ===
Born in Elvas, Vidigal began his career as a youth with his local club O Elvas before joining Académica in 2015. He made his professional debut on 8 January 2017 in a LigaPro match against FC Porto B, coming on as a 70th-minute substitute for Rui Miguel in a 2–1 away loss. He made five more appearances for Académica in 2016–17, all off the bench.

=== Fortuna Sittard ===
On 7 July 2017, Vidigal moved to Dutch Eerste Divisie side Fortuna Sittard on loan for the 2017–18 season. He made his debut on 18 August in a season-opening 5–1 home win over Dordrecht, scoring within ten minutes of coming on in place of Gavin Vlijter. The deal was made permanent on 19 December 2017, effective from the new year. Vidigal played a big role for Fortuna as he scored 10 goals in 29 games as the team returned to the Eredivisie for the first time since 2002, as runners-up to Jong Ajax; this included hat-tricks in wins away to Telstar and Almere City. Vidigal added another hat-trick on 25 September 2018 in the first round of the KNVB Cup, a 5–0 win at second-tier Helmond Sport.

After struggling for game time at Fortuna following promotion, Vidigal was loaned to Cypriot First Division side APOEL on 31 January 2019 for a year-and-a-half. He made his debut ten days later in a 2–0 win at Enosis Neon Paralimni, and scored within five minutes as a late substitute. He helped the team retain the title and finished cup runners-up to AEL Limassol; in September they took the Super Cup as well.

On 3 September 2020, Vidigal returned to Portugal's second tier on loan to Estoril. He scored eight times in 39 total games for the Canarinhos, including six in their league-winning campaign and was named as best young player in the Liga Portugal 2.

=== Marítimo ===
On 11 June 2021, Vidigal signed a three-year contract with Primeira Liga club Marítimo. He scored his first goal in his country's top flight on 16 August to open a 2–1 win at Belenenses SAD. Vidigal made 35 appearances in 2021–22 as Marítimo finished in 10th position. On 4 September 2022, he received a straight red card early in the second half of a 3–1 loss at Santa Clara. In 2022–23, Vidigal played 38 times, scoring eight goals but was unable to help prevent Marítimo suffering relegation, losing the play-offs to Estrela da Amadora on penalties.

=== Stoke City ===
Vidigal joined English Championship side Stoke City on 24 July 2023, signing a three-year contract for an undisclosed fee. He scored twice on his debut in a 4–1 win against Rotherham United on 5 August, and three later he scored the winning goal against West Bromwich Albion in the first round of the EFL Cup, adding the only goal against Watford on 19 August. He then drifted in and out of the team as the season progressed being mainly used as a substitute. He made 31 appearances for Stoke in 2023–24, scoring seven goals as the team avoided relegation finishing in 17th. Vidigal struggled for game time in 2024–25, only making ten Championship appearances, all as a substitute. Vidigal was not given a squad number by Mark Robins ahead of the 2025–26 season. He left Stoke by mutual consent in January 2026.

=== Wycombe Wanderers ===
Vidigal joined Wycombe Wanderers on 2 February 2026 following a trial period with the club. He was offered a new contract at the end of the season, but no deal was signed and he became a free agent.

=== Alverca ===
On 21 August 2026, Vidigal returned to the Portuguese top tier by signing with Alverca.

== International career ==
Vidigal earned 14 caps for Portugal at youth level, scoring twice in friendlies for the under-20 team in late 2017. His only appearance for the under-21 team was on 25 May 2018, playing the last two minutes of a 3–2 win over Italy in Estoril.

In March 2025, Vidigal received a call-up to the Angola national team for a set of 2026 FIFA World Cup qualification matches. He made his debut as a substitute in a 1–2 loss to Cape Verde on 25 March.

== Personal life ==
His Angolan father Beto and his uncles Lito, Luís, Jorge and Toni were all professional footballers. Born in Portugal, Vidigal is of Angolan descent and holds both passports; he had relatives who were full internationals for each country's national teams.

== Career statistics ==
As of match played 2 May 2026

Appearances and goals by club, season and competition
| Club | Season | League | | | National cup (Note: Includes Cypriot Cup, FA Cup, KNVB Cup and Taça de Portugal) | | League cup (Note: Includes EFL Cup and Taça da Liga) | | Other | | Total | |
| Club | Season | Division | Apps | Goals | Apps | Goals | Apps | Goals | Apps | Goals | Apps | Goals |
|---|---|---|---|---|---|---|---|---|---|---|---|---|
| Académica | 2016–17 | Liga Pro | 6 | 0 | 0 | 0 | 0 | 0 | — | | 6 | 0 |
| Fortuna Sittard | 2017–18 | Eerste Divisie | 29 | 10 | 3 | 0 | — | | — | | 32 | 10 |
| Fortuna Sittard | 2018–19 | Eredivisie | 10 | 2 | 3 | 3 | — | | — | | 13 | 5 |
| Fortuna Sittard | 2019–20 | Eredivisie | 0 | 0 | 0 | 0 | — | | — | | 0 | 0 |
| Fortuna Sittard | 2020–21 | Eredivisie | 0 | 0 | 0 | 0 | — | | — | | 0 | 0 |
| Fortuna Sittard | Total | | 39 | 12 | 6 | 3 | — | | — | | 45 | 15 |
| APOEL (loan) | 2018–19 | Cypriot First Division | 9 | 1 | 5 | 2 | — | | 0 | 0 | 14 | 3 |
| APOEL (loan) | 2019–20 | Cypriot First Division | 13 | 1 | 2 | 0 | — | | 4 (Note: One appearance in Cypriot Super Cup and three in UEFA Champions League) | 0 | 19 | 1 |
| APOEL (loan) | Total | | 22 | 2 | 7 | 2 | — | | 4 | 0 | 33 | 4 |
| Estoril (loan) | 2020–21 | Liga Portugal 2 | 32 | 6 | 5 | 2 | 1 | 0 | — | | 38 | 8 |
| Marítimo | 2021–22 | Primeira Liga | 33 | 1 | 1 | 0 | 1 | 0 | — | | 35 | 1 |
| Marítimo | 2022–23 | Primeira Liga | 32 | 8 | 1 | 0 | 3 | 0 | 2 (Note: Appearances in Primeira Liga relegation play-offs) | 0 | 38 | 8 |
| Marítimo | Total | | 65 | 9 | 2 | 0 | 4 | 0 | 2 | 0 | 73 | 9 |
| Stoke City | 2023–24 | EFL Championship | 29 | 6 | 1 | 0 | 1 | 1 | — | | 31 | 7 |
| Stoke City | 2024–25 | EFL Championship | 10 | 0 | 1 | 0 | 1 | 0 | — | | 12 | 0 |
| Stoke City | 2025–26 | EFL Championship | 0 | 0 | 0 | 0 | 0 | 0 | — | | 0 | 0 |
| Stoke City | Total | | 39 | 6 | 2 | 0 | 2 | 1 | — | | 43 | 7 |
| Wycombe Wanderers | 2025–26 | EFL League One | 13 | 2 | 0 | 0 | 0 | 0 | — | | 13 | 2 |
| Career total | | | 215 | 36 | 22 | 7 | 7 | 1 | 6 | 0 | 250 | 44 |

== Honours ==
APOEL

- Cypriot First Division: 2018–19
- Cypriot Super Cup: 2019

Estoril

- Liga Portugal 2: 2020–21
