= Caiçaras Club =

Private leisure club in Rio de Janeiro, Brazil

Founded in 1931, Caiçaras Club is a private leisure club in Rio de Janeiro, Brazil. Located on an island of 33,000 m2 in Lagoa Rodrigo de Freitas, the club held the Pan American Games Rio 2007 Water Ski competitions.
