= Beto Vidigal =

Angolan footballer and coach (1964–2019)

Personal information
- Full name: Norberto Deolindo Vidigal
- Date of birth: 9 June 1964
- Place of birth: Huíla, Angola
- Date of death: 19 December 2019 (aged 55)
- Place of death: Arronches, Portugal
- Position: Midfielder

Youth career
- O Elvas

Senior career*
Years	Team	Apps	(Gls)
1983–1988	O Elvas	116	(6)
1988–1990	Louletano	51	(10)
1990–1993	União Leiria	71	(5)
1993–1994	O Elvas	28	(5)
1994–1995	Naval	11	(2)
1995–1996	Vila Real	19	(0)
1996–2003	O Elvas		

Managerial career
- 2005–2009: O Elvas (assistant)
- * Club domestic league appearances and goals

Norberto Deolindo Vidigal (9 June 1964 – 19 December 2019) was an Angolan professional football midfielder and coach.

== Career ==
Vidigal was born Huíla, Portuguese Angola, and played for five clubs over a 20-year senior career. He started out at O Elvas CAD, achieving Primeira Liga promotion in 1986 and spending two seasons with the Alentejo side in that competition – their first and only.

After five years in the Segunda Liga, with Louletano DC (two seasons) and U.D. Leiria (three), Vidigal returned to Elvas, with the team now in the third tier. He then left for one-season stints with Associação Naval 1º de Maio and SC Vila Real in the same league, then returned to his main club to close out his career, eventually representing it in all five major levels of Portuguese football; he retired at the age of 39.

Vidigal later worked as assistant coach with O Elvas for four years, with the club in the fourth division.

== Personal life and death ==
Vidigal had eight brothers and four sisters, four of the former also being footballers: Luís, Lito, Toni and Jorge. The first represented Portugal internationally, whilst the second opted to appear for Angola; his son, André, was also involved in the sport professionally.

Vidigal died on 19 December 2019 in Arronches, aged 55.
