= General Urquiza =

- Municipality and village
- Interactive map of General Urquiza
- Country: Argentina
- Province: Misiones Province

Population (2001)
  - Total: 247
- Time zone: UTC−3 (ART)

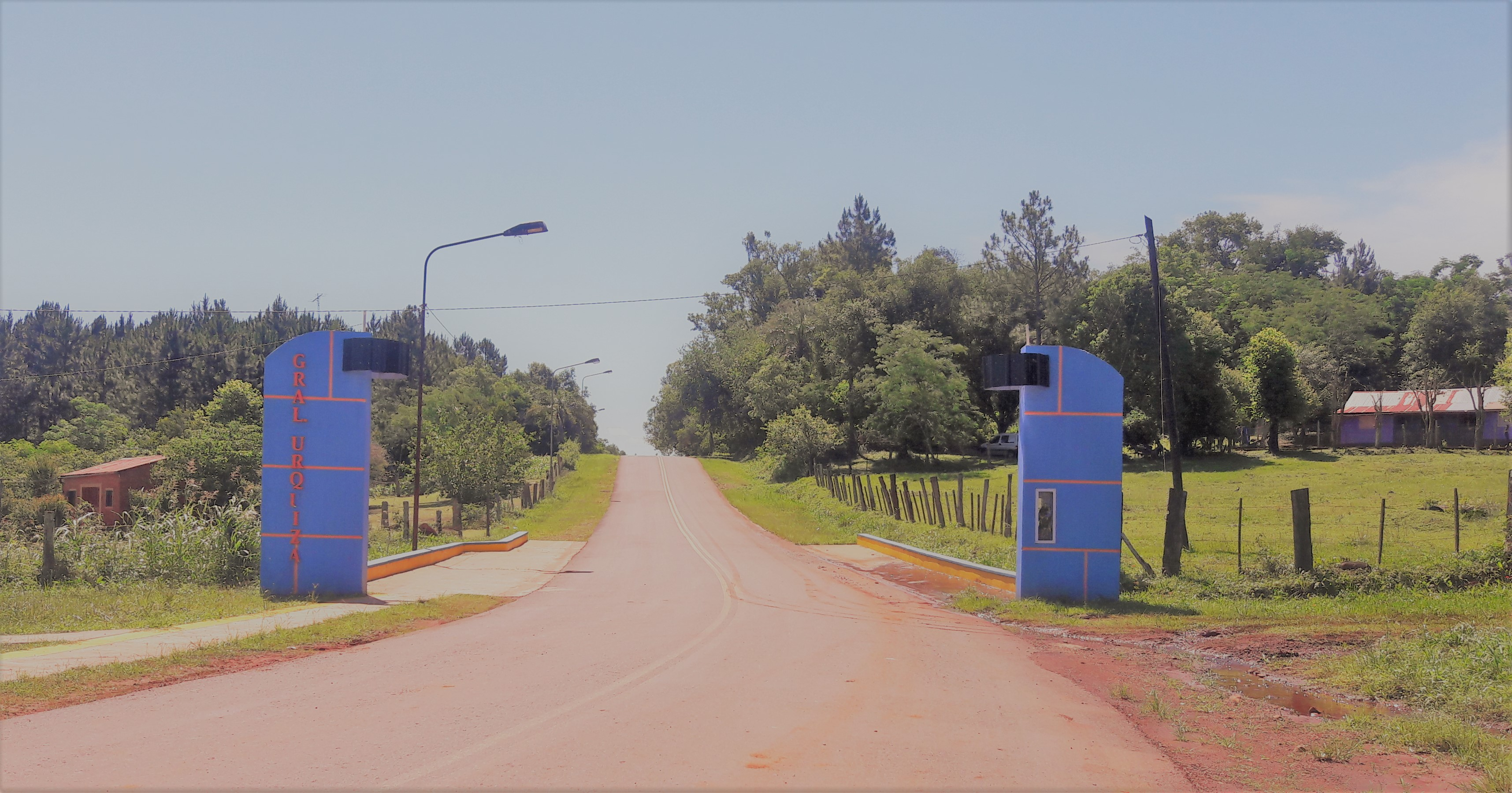
General Urquiza

General Urquiza is a village and municipality in Misiones Province in north-eastern Argentina. It is located within the department San Ignacio. The town runs from the coast of Paraná River and the National Road No. 12. General Urquiza is located on the coast of Paraná and settled the major population centers: Puerto Menocchio, Port of Spain, Puerto Lapacho and Gisela Cologne. However, the decline in the use of the river as a transport medium promoted the formation of a settlement located just 1.5 miles of Route 12, in what is known as Barrio Industrial and building housing the municipality of General Urquiza. For this reason this settlement is now known as General Urquiza. According to the 2001 census, the population center is only the latter, the others being considered as dispersed rural population.

The municipality was created in 1954 by the name of Juan Domingo Perón, then president of Argentina, with its first office in the town of Puerto Menocchio current, 12 kilometers from the current location. The next year's military coup renamed the newly created municipality by General Urquiza, in honor of Justo José de Urquiza.

The Industrial district which sits the town since 2006, is formed from the company premises Pipoil, broken in the early 21st century and revived a few years later. This move is that the ports on the Parana that formed the main means of communication (in the municipality stood Puerto Lapacho, and entered egresaba where most of the consumption and production) stopped working, causing a natural Scroll to the area near Route 12, vialmente better communicated with the rest of the province.

== Economy ==
The main economic activities of the municipality are the cultivation of yerba mate industry and forestry. It also highlights plantations snuff, tea, citrus and cattle.

== Population ==
The municipality has a population of 1,335 inhabitants according to the 2001 census (INDEC). The town of General Urquiza had 247 inhabitants (INDEC, 2001), 2% less than 253 inhabitants (INDEC, 1991) of the previous census.
