= Nicolás Urquiza =

Argentine artist and designer (born 1969)

Nicolás Grasso Urquiza (born February 5, 1969) is an Argentine artist and designer. His figurative artwork, as well as his fashion pieces, often make use of erotic and provocative imagery strongly influenced by the nature and culture of the Alto Paraná Atlantic forests and Salvador de Bahia. His decorative work for interiors and events incorporates rich floral design and a meticulous selection of vintage furniture. Urquiza is currently based in New York City.

== Early life and career ==
Nicolás Urquiza was born in Paraná, Entre Ríos. His father, Raul Grasso Urquiza, was a doctor and great-grandson of Justo José de Urquiza, president of the Argentine Confederation from 1854 to 1860. He began to develop his interest in art when very young, winning the first prize of an art competition sponsored by the local art museum at the age of 15. He studied Industrial Design at the University of Buenos Aires for two years before finding his vocation at the private art school of Sara García Uriburu under the guidance of Carlos Bisolino. His first exhibition was singled out for criticism by the Catholic Church, which tried to censor it, eventually taking the issue to a notable television show. With his third show cancelled and his work confiscated by the police because of its content, Urquiza left the country travelling to Paris, London, Berlin, Kenya and Egypt, moving then to Brazil on account of a lifelong fascination with bossa nova and tropicalismo. His art was there readily accepted by what he perceived as a more openminded and tolerant society.

== Art Photography and Fashion design ==
In 1997 Urquiza settled in Manhattan where he worked at the renovations of a popular cafe and met Puerto Rican fashion designer and model Adrian Alicea. They became business partners and creative collaborators, establishing the brand Nico & Adrian of avant-garde couture and a ready-to-wear diffusion line. During the next years the duo would successfully develop a provocative style drawing inspiration from their travels, playing with sexual ethnic and class stereotypes around Latino aesthetic. At the same time Urquiza familiarized with contemporary fashion photography through which he diversified his artwork. His art, photography and fashion work, have been published internationally in many publications such as Vogue Italia, Preferences Magazine, Beautiful Vision, Playboy, Vibe, L'uomo Vogue, In Style, Tetu, Numero, and BUTT Magazine

== Interior and event design ==
Urquiza involved first with architectural decoration while living in Bahia, but only in the late 2000s he would start taking commissions in New York City from event companies, primarily at the Plaza Hotel, where he specialized in large scale floral arrangements. His work with wedding planner David Tutera lead him to expand its services and relate to the field of interior design. Since 2007 he has teamed with other designers to lead several renovation projects, mainly in private residences of the Northeastern United States and Buenos Aires historic district.

== Style and themes ==
Urquiza's artwork deals specially with taboos around eroticism and nature. He often depicts nudes with a clear appeal to arouse, while other of his pieces explore decadence in an ambiguous manner as a crossroad of subversion and despair.
