= São Conrado =

- Neighborhood
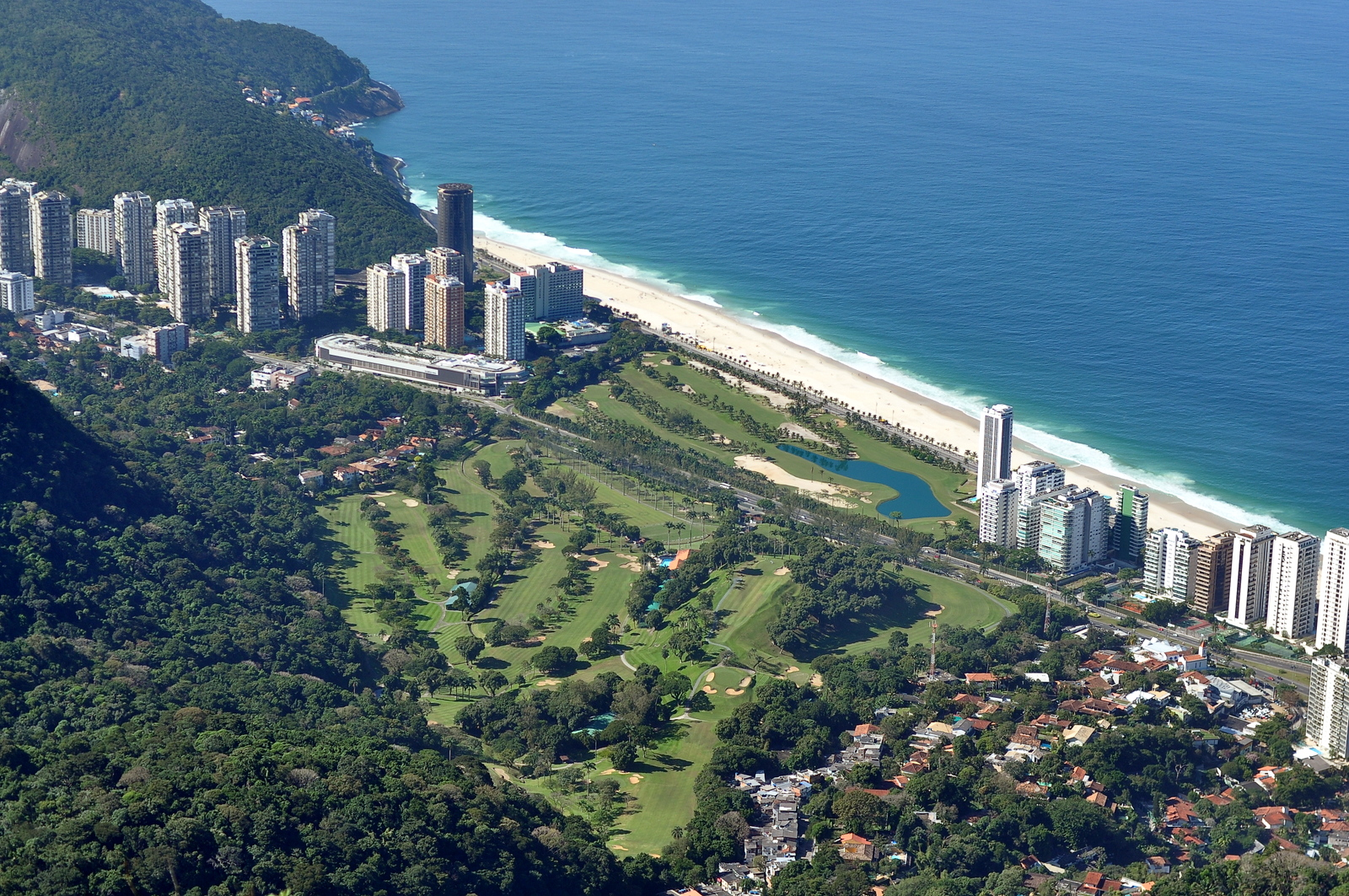
- São Conrado aerial view

- Location in Rio de Janeiro São Conrado (Brazil)
- Coordinates: 22°59′29″S 43°16′00″W
- Country: Brazil
- State: Rio de Janeiro (RJ)
- Municipality/City: Rio de Janeiro
- Zone: South Zone

Population (2010)
  - Total: 10,980

São Conrado (Portuguese: /sɐ̃w̃ kõˈʁadu/) is a neighborhood in the South Zone of the city of Rio de Janeiro, Brazil. It is nestled in between the neighborhoods of Barra da Tijuca to the southwest and Leblon to the northeast. The neighborhood takes its name from a small church, Igreja de São Conrado (Church of São Conrado), which was constructed early in the 20th century by Conrado Jacob Niemeyer (1831–1905). São Conrado, which ranks as one of the areas with the highest Human Development Index in Brazil, presents a stark contrast to Rocinha on its border, which is one of the largest and poorest favelas in Brazil.

São Conrado is famous for its hang gliding (popular with locals and tourists alike), Fashion Mall which houses over 150 stores carrying national and international designers, and golf course. The neighborhood, or bairro, is made up of sophisticated residential buildings, night clubs, and elegant restaurants. The famous Morro Dois Irmãos, or Two Brothers Mountain, featured in movies, television shows, and postcards from the city, separates the neighborhood from the rest of the South Zone. It is also noted for the mansions on the foot of the Pedra da Gávea, the largest seaside granite rock on Earth, which separates São Conrado from the West Zone. The House at Canoas (Casa das Canoas), the private home of Oscar Niemeyer (1907–2012), is located on Estrada das Canoas and is considered a masterpiece of Mid-century modern residential architecture.

São Conrado is a high-income residential neighborhood in Rio de Janeiro, known for high property values and notable residents, including public figures such as entertainer Xuxa and former municipal officials. Real estate in the area ranks among the highest in valuation in South America.

== Notable residents ==
- Marcello Alencar, Governor of Rio de Janeiro (1995–1999), Mayor of Rio de Janeiro (1983–1986, 1989–1993)

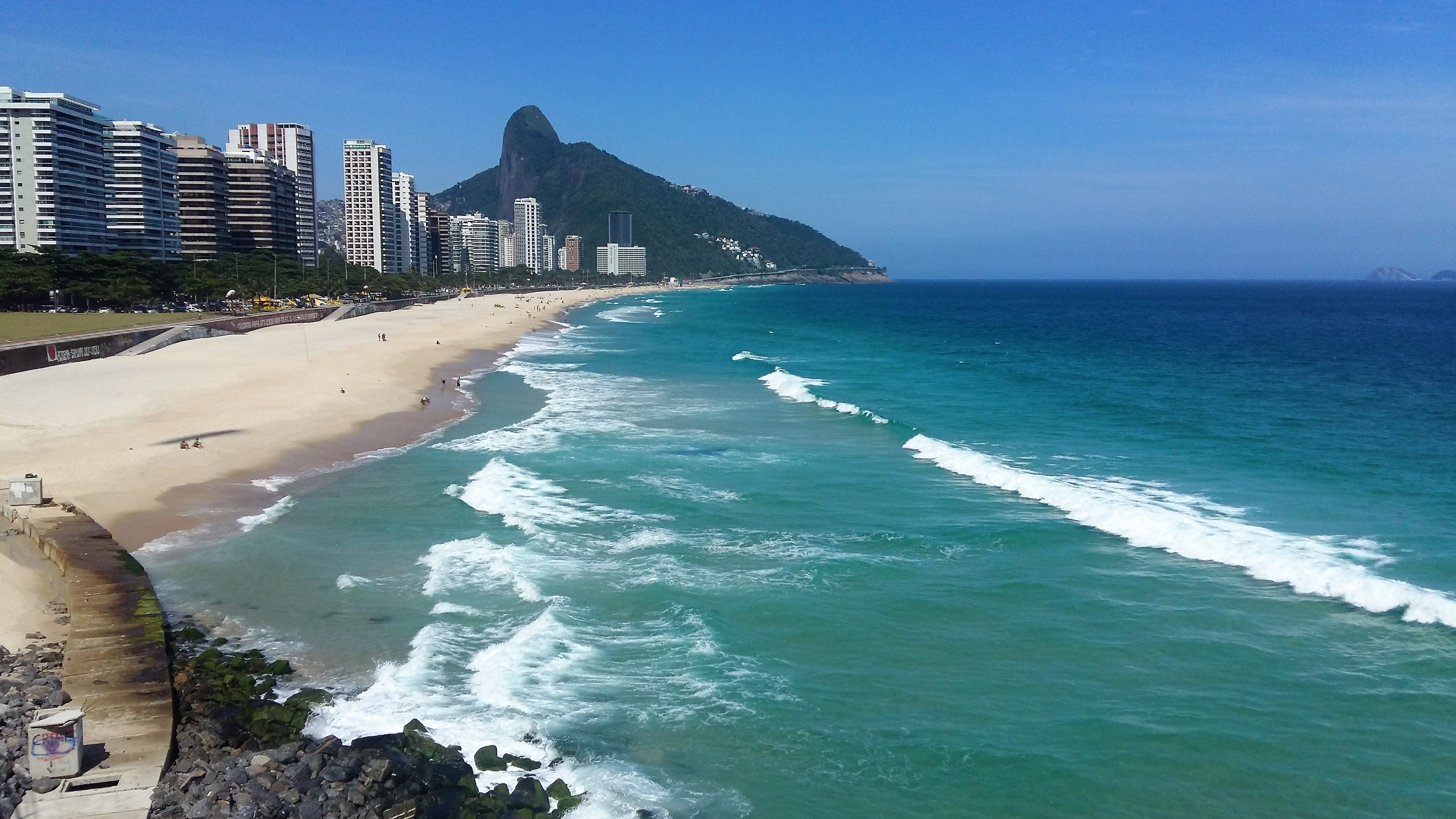
São Conrado coast with cycling route 'Ciclovia Tim Maia' and mountain Morro Dois Irmãos, seen from west.
