= José Luís Vidigal =

Angolan-born Portuguese footballer

Luís Vidigal
Personal information
- Full name: José Luís da Cruz Vidigal
- Date of birth: 15 March 1973 (age 53)
- Place of birth: Sá da Bandeira, Angola
- Height: 1.84 m (6 ft 0 in)
- Position: Defensive midfielder

Youth career
- 1984–1992: O Elvas

Senior career*
Years	Team	Apps	(Gls)
1992–1994	O Elvas	60	(3)
1994–1995	Estoril	27	(0)
1995–2000	Sporting CP	110	(5)
2000–2004	Napoli	86	(8)
2004–2005	Livorno	30	(3)
2005–2006	Udinese	23	(1)
2006–2008	Livorno	35	(1)
2008–2009	Estrela Amadora	15	(3)
Total		369	(23)

International career
1995–1996	Portugal U21	7	(1)
1996	Portugal U23	7	(0)
2000–2002	Portugal	15	(0)
Medal record
Men's football
Representing Portugal
UEFA European Championship
Bronze medal – third place	2000 Belgium-Netherlands
- * Club domestic league appearances and goals

José Luís da Cruz Vidigal (born 15 March 1973) is a Portuguese former professional footballer who played as a defensive midfielder.

During his extensive career, the no-nonsense midfield battler spent more years abroad (Italy, eight) than in his country of adoption (seven), where he represented mainly Sporting CP.

A Portugal international for two years, Vidigal appeared with the national team at Euro 2000, helping them to third place.

== Club career ==
=== Early career and Sporting CP ===
Born in Sá da Bandeira, Portuguese Angola, Vidigal moved to Portugal at an early age, and started his footballing career with amateurs O Elvas CAD, joining Segunda Liga club G.D. Estoril-Praia in summer 1994.

The following year, Vidigal signed with another team from the Lisbon area, Sporting CP of the Primeira Liga. After tentative beginnings, he became an essential defensive unit, contributing a career-best (in Portugal) 32 games in the 1999–2000 season as the Lions won their first title in 18 years, his only career trophy.

=== Italian spell ===
At 27, Vidigal moved to Italy, where he would remain the following eight years. He started out at SSC Napoli after signing along Sporting teammates Facundo Quiroga and Abdelilah Saber, but only played four Serie A matches in his first year and the team was also relegated. His best individual year – 33 appearances, five goals in the 2002–03 campaign – was incidentally spent in the Serie B, but they narrowly avoided another relegation after ending 16th.

Napoli finished higher in 2003–04, but were finally relegated off the pitch. Upon this, Vidigal moved to fellow top-flight side AS Livorno Calcio, starting throughout most of the season and helping to a comfortable ninth position.

Vidigal was irregularly used in his final three years, often from the bench, representing Udinese Calcio (one year) and returning to Livorno where he played until 2008.

=== Return to Portugal ===
Vidigal returned to his country aged 35, joining modest C.F. Estrela da Amadora where his older brother Lito was coach. In his first game, on 28 September 2008, he scored twice to help beat C.D. Nacional 2–1; however, he missed most of the season due to injury as the capital-based club was also immerse in a severe financial crisis – eventually being relegated from the top flight to the third tier; he retired shortly after.

== International career ==
Vidigal earned 15 caps for Portugal, his first being on 23 February 2000 in a 1–1 friendly draw with Belgium at Charleroi. Selected for UEFA Euro 2000, he had to battle for position with Paulo Bento and Costinha (Paulo Sousa was also called, but was injured), but managed to take part in four games for the national team, including the semi-final loss against France.

Vidigal's last appearance was on 12 October 2002 in the 1–1 draw with Tunisia played in Lisbon, in another friendly. He also represented the nation at the 1996 Summer Olympics, playing all the matches en route to fourth place.

== Personal life ==
Vidigal was the second of 13 children, four of his brothers also being footballers: Beto, Lito (whom represented Angola internationally), Toni and Jorge. His nephew, André, was also involved in the sport professionally.

== Honours ==
Sporting CP

- Primeira Liga: 1999–2000
- Supertaça Cândido de Oliveira: 1995
