= Rua General Urquiza =

Street perpendicular to Leblon's beach in Rio de Janeiro, Brazil

Rua General Urquiza (Portuguese for General Urquiza Street) is located in the neighbourhood of Leblon, in the city of Rio de Janeiro, Brazil. The street is perpendicular to Leblon’s beach, starting in the Avenue Delphin Moreira and finishing in the staircase that gives access to the Capitao Cesar de Andrade street. It intersects with General San Martin avenue, Ataulfo de Paiva avenue, Professor Artur Ramos street, João de Barros street, Humberto de Campos street, Dias Ferreira street, Desembargador Alfredo Russel street and Antero de Quental square.

Its name is a homage to General Justo José de Urquiza, president of Argentina from 1853 to 1860. Before that, the street was known only as the 15th street.

At first sight, the intense arborization gives an impression of homogeneity to the street, but when you walk along the street this sensation quickly disappears. The different height and style of the buildings is clearly heterogeneous. The street has a narrow one-directional road, and presents parking in both sides in almost all its extension. The sidewalk that used to present different widths along the street, is now being partially rectified by using fences, making walking along General Urquiza much less pleasant. The reason for the fences is to give security to the inhabitants against the increasing violence in Rio de Janeiro.

The buildings present very different dates of construction, architectural styles and number of floors. From buildings preserved as part of the historic patrimony to buildings recently constructed due to property speculation. The number of floors ranges from buildings with two floors to buildings with even 13 floors. From simple flats with 50m² to luxurious attics of even 600m². Flats on the side next to the beach are more expensive that the one located on the other side.

The General Urquiza street has non-residential buildings (stores, restaurants, banks, post offices and doctor offices), buildings for multiple use, that have stores at ground level and strictly residential at the others levels. Traffic in General Urquiza is usually calmed, only in the block from Antero de Quental square there is more movement. This is because of the location of 3 bus-stops in this block. These stops are also a good point for the street. These buses go across the downtown to the other zone of the city, providing the inhabitants with an important medium of transport. All this variety that the street presents makes it a place for inhabitants of different social levels and economic levels.

General Urquiza Street is also a meeting point for young people in the Leblon beach. A common nickname for this street is "GU". Another important meeting point is the corner with Dias Ferreira Street.
