= Lito Vidigal =

Angolan footballer and coach (born 1969)

Personal information
- Full name: José Carlos Fernandes Vidigal
- Date of birth: 11 July 1969 (age 57)
- Place of birth: Luanda, Angola
- Height: 1.78 m (5 ft 10 in)
- Position: Defender

Youth career
- 1983–1987: O Elvas

Senior career*
Years	Team	Apps	(Gls)
1987–1988	Fronteirense		
1988–1989	O Elvas	3	(0)
1989–1991	Estrela Portalegre		
1991–1995	Campomaiorense	95	(5)
1995–2002	Belenenses	144	(3)
2002–2003	Santa Clara	6	(0)
2003–2004	O Elvas		

International career
1996–2001	Angola	17	(0)

Managerial career
- 2004–2005: Portosantense
- 2006–2007: Pontassolense
- 2007–2008: Ribeirão
- 2008: Estrela Amadora
- 2009: Portimonense
- 2009–2010: União Leiria
- 2011–2012: Angola
- 2012–2013: Al-Ittihad
- 2013: AEL Limassol
- 2014–2015: Belenenses
- 2015–2017: Arouca
- 2017: Maccabi Tel Aviv
- 2017–2018: Aves
- 2018–2019: Vitória Setúbal
- 2019: Boavista
- 2020: Vitória Setúbal
- 2020: Marítimo
- 2021: Moreirense
- 2024: Feirense
- 2025: Boavista
Medal record
Men's football
Representing Angola(as manager)
African Nations Championship
Runner-up	2011 Sudan
- * Club domestic league appearances and goals

José Carlos Fernandes Vidigal (born 11 July 1969), commonly known as Lito Vidigal, is an Angolan professional football manager and former player who played as a defender.

He spent his entire playing career in Portugal, mainly with Belenenses in the Primeira Liga. An Angola international for five years, he was part of the squad at the 1998 Africa Cup of Nations.

Vidigal managed eight clubs in Portugal's top flight, including Belenenses. He also led his nation at the 2012 Africa Cup of Nations.

== Playing career ==
Born in Luanda, Portuguese Angola, Vidigal spent his entire career in Portugal, representing at the professional level O Elvas, Campomaiorense, Belenenses and Santa Clara and retiring in 2004 at the age of 35, totalling 214 matches between the Primeira Liga and the Segunda Liga.

Internationally, Vidigal played with Angola at the 1998 Africa Cup of Nations, earning 17 caps.

== Coaching career ==
Vidigal took up coaching immediately after retiring, starting with lowly Pontassolense and Ribeirão. In 2008, he moved to Estrela da Amadora – coaching his younger brother Luís after he returned from a lengthy spell in Italy – and joined second-tier Portimonense in February of the following year.

In late October 2009, as Manuel Fernandes bought out his contract at União de Leiria to return to his favourite club Vitória de Setúbal, Vidigal was named his successor. On 8 January 2011, he was appointed coach of the Angola national side. The Black Antelopes qualified for the 2012 Africa Cup of Nations in October, and were eliminated at the group stage of the final tournament in Gabon and Equatorial Guinea.

With the stated aim of winning titles abroad rather than avoiding relegation in Portugal, Vidigal remained in Africa and signed with Libya's Al-Ittihad from December 2012. In April in 2013, he left Tripoli due to political instability.

Dismissed by AEL Limassol of the Cypriot First Division at the start of the season, Vidigal returned to Belenenses late into 2013–14, replacing Marco Paulo at the helm of the bottom-placed team and becoming their third coach of the season. Even though he did not finish the following campaign, being replaced by Jorge Simão with nine matches to go, the side eventually qualified for the UEFA Europa League after finishing sixth.

Vidigal repeated the feat in 2015–16 after leading Arouca to a best-ever classification of fifth, in only the club's third year in the top flight. Previously, in March 2016, he renewed his contract for two years.

In February 2017, Vidigal left Arouca for Maccabi Tel Aviv on an 18-month contract with the option of a further year. Despite leading the team to the runners-up position behind Hapoel Be'er Sheva, he was relieved of his duties by director Jordi Cruyff at the end of the season.

Vidigal returned to Portugal's main division in October 2017 when he was hired by Aves, but left shortly after following disputes with the board. Ahead of the following campaign, he signed a two-year deal at Vitória de Setúbal, and again parted before its conclusion. Days later, he replaced the sacked Jorge Simão at struggling Boavista.

On 17 December 2019, having taken 18 points from 14 league fixtures, Vidigal was dismissed. He returned to Setúbal in July 2020, three points above the drop zone with four games to play. Having succeeded in that task, he moved on to Marítimo to replace José Gomes.

On 4 December 2020, with the Madeiran club in 15th place, Vidigal was replaced by under-23 manager Milton Mendes. He took over from João Henriques at Moreirense on 29 November of the following year, but left after only one month.

Vidigal returned to active on 3 April 2024, on a deal at second-division side Feirense. He managed to avoid relegation in the playoffs, defeating Lusitânia 3–1 on aggregate.

Vidigal rejoined Boavista, bottom of the top tier, on 9 February 2025. Less than two months later, having overseen six matches with only one win and with the team still in that position, he was relieved of his duties.

== Personal life ==
Vidigal had 12 brothers and sisters, four of his male siblings being footballers: Beto, Luís (who played for Sporting CP and in the Serie A, represented Portugal and was coached in the 2008–09 campaign by Lito), Toni and Jorge. His nephew, André, was also involved in the sport professionally.

== Managerial statistics ==
As of match played 3 January 2022

Managerial record by team and tenure
Team	From	To	Record								Ref
Team	From	To	G	W	D	L	GF	GA	GD	Win %	Ref
União Leiria	23 October 2009	1 July 2010	29	9	6	14	33	44	−11	31.03	
Angola	10 January 2011	12 April 2012	14	6	5	3	16	11	+5	42.86	
AEL Limassol	1 July 2013	22 October 2013	6	3	2	1	8	5	+3	50.00	
Belenenses	20 March 2014	17 March 2015	42	17	13	12	51	49	+2	40.48	
Arouca	1 June 2015	11 February 2017	72	27	20	25	81	84	−3	37.50	
Maccabi Tel Aviv	11 February 2017	30 June 2017	19	13	1	5	31	12	+19	68.42	
Aves	2 October 2017	22 January 2018	15	6	2	7	22	24	−2	40.00	
Vitória Setúbal	30 June 2018	25 January 2019	24	7	5	12	27	33	−6	29.17	
Bovista	27 January 2019	17 December 2019	32	13	7	12	35	36	−1	40.63	
Vitória Setúbal	7 July 2020	31 July 2020	4	1	1	2	3	3	+0	25.00	
Marítimo	3 August 2020	4 December 2020	9	3	1	5	12	15	−3	33.33	
Moreirense	30 November 2021	5 January 2022	5	1	0	4	3	7	−4	20.00	
Career totals			271	106	63	102	322	323	−1	39.11	

== Honours ==
=== Manager ===
Angola

- African Nations Championship runner-up: 2011
