= Toni Vidigal =

Portuguese footballer

Personal information
- Full name: António Leonel Vidigal
- Date of birth: 1 March 1975 (age 51)
- Place of birth: Elvas, Portugal
- Height: 1.66 m (5 ft 5 1/2 in)
- Position: Midfielder

Youth career
- 1988–1992: O Elvas

Senior career*
Years	Team	Apps	(Gls)
1992–1994	O Elvas	66	(4)
1994–1999	Estoril	87	(11)
1995–1996	→ Vitória Setúbal (loan)	23	(2)
1999–2000	Penafiel	29	(2)
2000–2004	Varzim	85	(6)
2004–2006	Portosantense	34	(6)
2006–2009	O Elvas		
2009–2010	Sintra Football		
- * Club domestic league appearances and goals

António Leonel Vidigal (born 1 March 1975) is a Portuguese retired professional footballer who played as a central midfielder.

== Career ==
Born in Elvas, Portalegre District, Vidigal made his senior debut at only 16, with O Elvas C.A.D. in the third division. In 1994 he signed for G.D. Estoril Praia in the Segunda Liga, going on to remain the following seven years at that level, also representing Vitória de Setúbal, F.C. Penafiel and Varzim SC, achieving Primeira Liga promotion with the latter in 2001.

After two seasons with Varzim in the top flight (45 games, one goal) and a third in division two, Vidigal joined third-tier C.D. Portosantense. Aged 31, he returned to his first senior club, now in the fourth division, closing out his career in 2010 after a brief spell with amateurs Club Sintra Football.

== Personal life ==
Vidigal had four brothers who were also footballers (from a total of 13 siblings): Beto, Luís, Lito and Jorge. The second represented Portugal internationally, whilst the third opted to appear for Angola; his nephew, André, was also involved in the sport professionally.
