= Jorge Vidigal =

Angolan footballer

Personal information
- Full name: Jorge Filipe Vidigal
- Date of birth: 29 January 1978 (age 48)
- Place of birth: Elvas, Portugal
- Height: 1.76 m (5 ft 9 in)
- Position: Right-back

Youth career
- 1987–1993: O Elvas
- 1993–1994: Fronteirense
- 1994–1997: O Elvas

Senior career*
Years	Team	Apps	(Gls)
1997–1998	O Elvas	23	(0)
1998–2000	Estoril	36	(0)
2000–2002	Sporting CP B	65	(6)
2002	Sporting CP	1	(0)
2002–2003	O Elvas	18	(4)
2003–2006	Olhanense	100	(13)
2006–2008	Beira-Mar	27	(1)
2008–2009	União Madeira	13	(0)
2009–2012	Caála		
Total		283	(24)

International career
2011	Angola	1	(0)
- * Club domestic league appearances and goals

Jorge Filipe Vidigal (born 29 January 1978) is an Angolan former professional footballer who played as a right-back.

== Club career ==
Born in Elvas, Portugal, Vidigal played most of his career in the country's lower leagues, representing hometown club O Elvas CAD (two spells), G.D. Estoril Praia, S.C. Olhanense and C.F. União. He also spent two years at Sporting CP, but appeared almost exclusively for its reserves.

Vidigal's only full Primeira Liga experience came with S.C. Beira-Mar, who signed the player from Olhanense – where he also appeared as a defensive midfielder – on a two-year contract. He only appeared in 11 matches in his debut season, and the Aveiro team were relegated.

In the summer of 2008, following a brief stint in Madeira with União, Vidigal joined C.R. Caála, returning to the land of his ancestors.

== International career ==
With his older brother Lito as coach, Vidigal earned one international cap for Angola on 27 August 2011, as a substitute in a 2–1 friendly loss to DR Congo in Dundo.

== Personal life ==
Vidigal was the youngest of 13 brothers and sisters, four of his male siblings also being footballers: Beto, Lito – who represented Angola as a player and coach – Luís (played for Sporting and Portugal with success, spent several years in Italy and was coached by Lito at C.F. Estrela da Amadora) and Toni. His nephew André was also involved in the sport professionally.

== Honours ==
Sporting CP

- Primeira Liga: 2001–02
- Taça de Portugal: 2001–02
