= Lagoa, Rio de Janeiro =

Neighborhood in Rio de Janeiro, Rio de Janeiro, Brazil

Lagoa
- Neighborhood
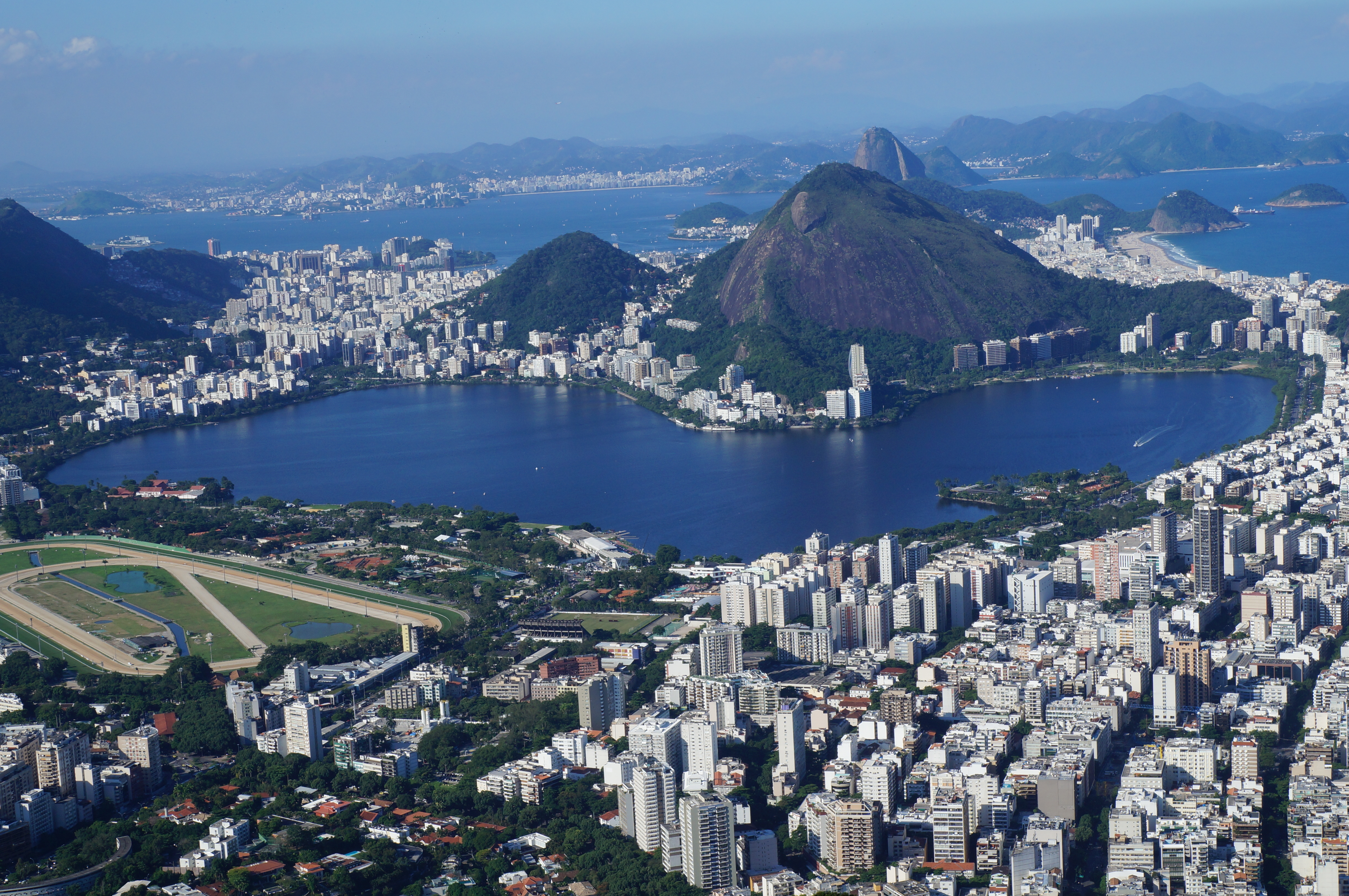
- View of Lagoa neighborhood and Lagoa Rodrigo de Freitas

- Location in Rio de Janeiro Lagoa (Brazil)
- Coordinates: 22°58′13″S 43°12′38″W
- Country: Brazil
- State: Rio de Janeiro (RJ)
- Municipality/City: Rio de Janeiro
- Zone: South Zone

Population (2010)
  - Total: 21,198

Lagoa (English: Lagoon) is an affluent residential neighborhood in Rio de Janeiro, Brazil located around the Rodrigo de Freitas Lagoon. It borders the neighborhoods of Ipanema, Leblon, Copacabana, Gávea, Jardim Botânico, and Humaitá.

It is the third most expensive neighborhood to live in South America. It is also one of the few places in Rio de Janeiro without a favela. The population is about 18,200 inhabitants. Around Rodrigo de Freitas Lagoon, there is a 7.5 km long cycleway and many parks.
