= Jardim Botânico, Rio de Janeiro =

Jardim Botânico
- Neighborhood
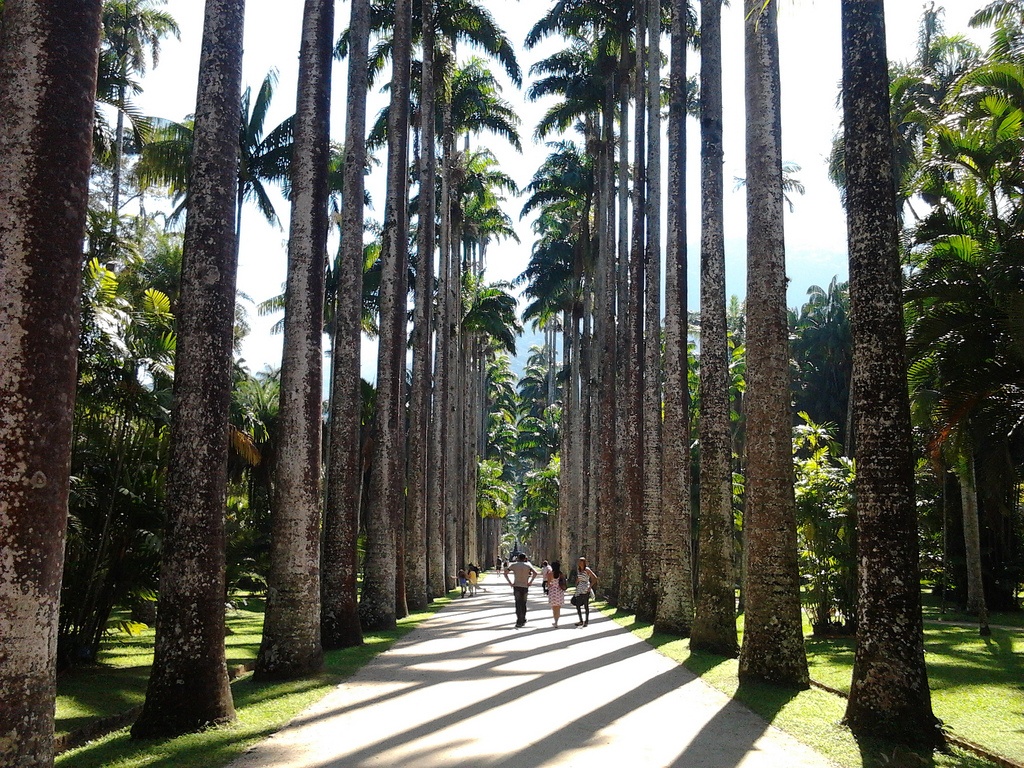
- Rio de Janeiro Botanical Garden

- Location in Rio de Janeiro Jardim Botânico (Brazil)
- Coordinates: 22°57′48″S 43°13′20″W
- Country: Brazil
- State: Rio de Janeiro (RJ)
- Municipality/City: Rio de Janeiro
- Zone: South Zone

Jardim Botânico (English: Botanical Garden) is an affluent residential neighborhood of Rio de Janeiro, Brazil, located north of Ipanema and Leblon, just across Lagoa Rodrigo de Freitas and east of Gávea. Jardim Botânico lies in the South Zone of Rio de Janeiro.

The district got its name as it grew around the city's Botanical Garden. The residents are generally upper-middle to upper-class and do not live near a favela, which is rare in the city. It differs from most of Rio's neighborhoods due to the large number of large detached houses, again not that common in the densely populated south zone. It is home to many Brazilian celebrities and the headquarters of the nationwide television network, Rede Globo. Many of Rede Globo's studios are in the neighbourhood.

The main road in the borough is the Rua Jardim Botanico (Jardim Botanico Street). The neighborhood leads to Rio de Janeiro's large Tijuca Forest, using a road that winds up through the mountainous forest.

One of Rio de Janeiro's most famous carnival blocs parades annually through the streets of Jardim Botanico. The bloc calls itself "Suvaco do Cristo", which translates to "Armpit of the Christ" because Jardim Botânico lies underneath the right armpit of Rio de Janeiro's most prominent landmark, Cristo Redentor (Christ the Redeemer) statue.
