= Leblon =

- Neighborhood
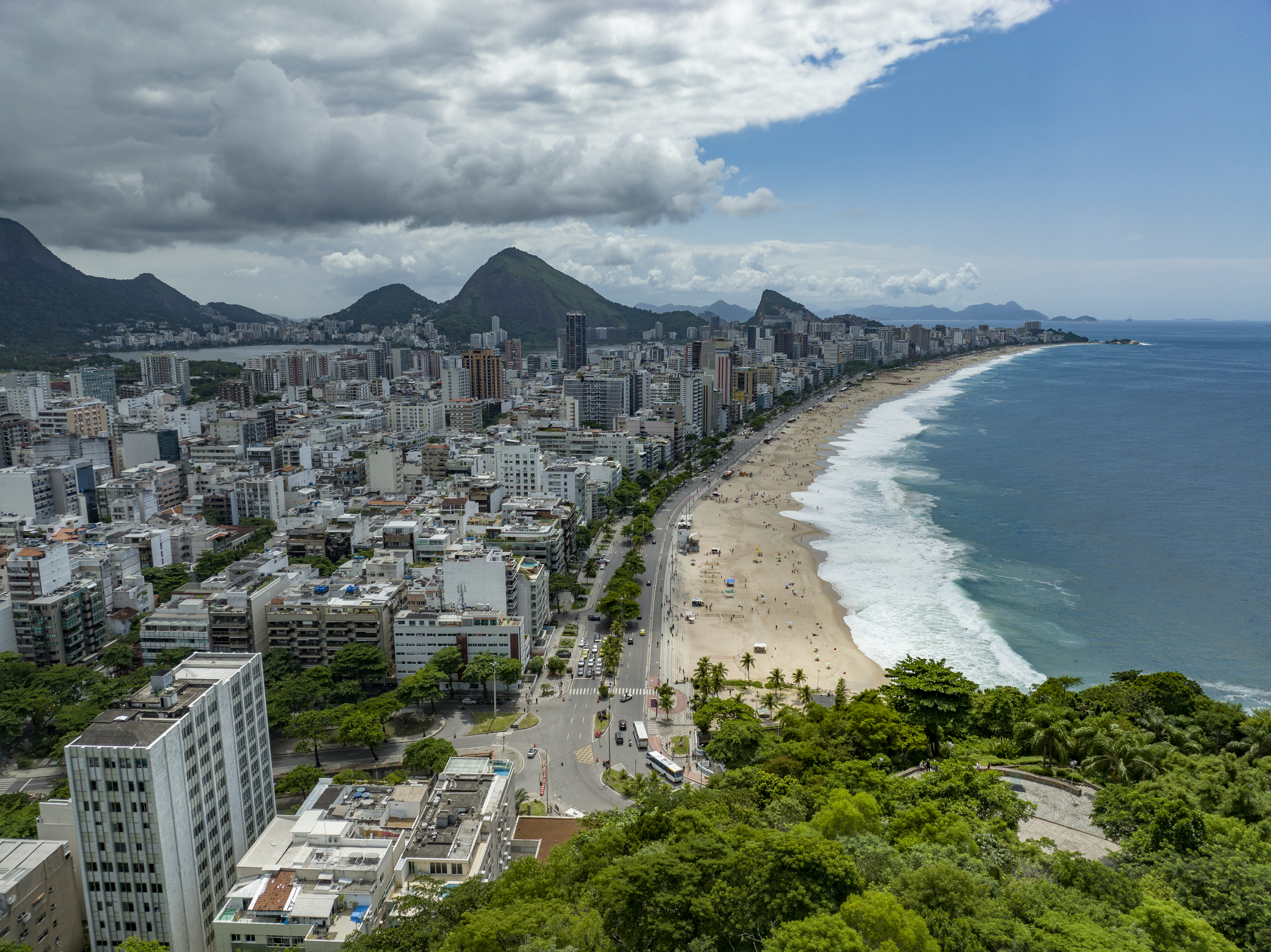
- Panoramic view of Leblon

- Location in Rio de Janeiro Leblon (Brazil)
- Coordinates: 22°59′00″S 43°13′33″W
- Country: Brazil
- State: Rio de Janeiro (RJ)
- Municipality/City: Rio de Janeiro
- Zone: South Zone
- Administrative Region: Lagoa

Area
  - Total: 2.15 km^{2} (0.83 sq mi)

Population (2010)
  - Total: 46,044

Leblon (Portuguese pronunciation: [leˈblõ]) is a neighborhood of Rio de Janeiro, Brazil. It is also the name of the local beach. The neighborhood is located in the South Zone of the city, between Lagoa Rodrigo de Freitas, Morro Dois Irmãos and the Jardim de Alah channel, bordering the Gávea, Ipanema, Lagoa, and Vidigal neighborhoods. It is regarded as a very affluent area and featured in lots of Brazilian popular culture.

Leblon began as a quilombo of escaped slaves created by a Portuguese abolitionist landowner.

== Etymology ==
The neighborhood is named for Carlos Leblon, a whaling empresario of French origin who possessed a chácara in the region since 1845. Before the area was urbanized it was known as Campo do Leblon (Leblon's Field).

== Early history ==
The Quilombo of Leblon was a quilombo (settlement of escaped African slaves) that existed at the end of the 19th century in the present-day region of Clube Campestre da Guanabara and surroundings from what is now Rua Timothy Da Costa to Morro Dois Irmãos (in English "Two Brothers Hill") in Rio de Janeiro.

The creator of the quilombo was the Portuguese José de Seixas Magalhães, who dedicated himself to the manufacture and trade of suitcases. and pod bags on Rua Gonçalves Dias, at the center of the city. His bags were made in a factory with steam engine. In addition to the luggage factory, Seixas also owned a farm in Leblon where he cultivated flowers with the help of slaves fugitives. Seixas hid the fugitives in the Leblon farm with the help of the main abolitionists from the capital of Empire, many of them members of Abolitionist Confederation. The Seixas flower farm was known as the "quilombo Leblon", a name that referred to the former owner of the region, the Frenchman Carlos Leblon. It was in the Quilombo do Leblon that Seixas cultivated his famous camellias, which were the symbol of the abolitionist movement.

The Quilombo do Leblon had the protection of Princess Isabel. As a token of gratitude, Seixas regularly supplied camellias to Isabel Palace, the princess’s residence in Laranjeiras (today, the seat of the government of the State of Rio de Janeiro). The camellias of Seixas adorned the Princess’s work table and her private chapel, where she made her prayers. In addition to the camellias, Seixas also offered the golden penalty to the Princess Regent who, later, on 13 May 1888, would be used to sign the Golden Law. The quilombo gave rise to the current name of the neighborhood of Leblon.

== Economy ==
The average nominal monthly income of people aged 10 or over (with income) in Leblon is R$6,844.63 (according to the 2010 census by the Brazilian Institute of Geography and Statistics). Leblon is one of the most sought-after neighborhoods in the city and the one that increases in value each year. It has the most expensive square meter in the country, costing R$18,332. In areas close to the beach, however, this value can reach R$20,000.

== Characteristics ==
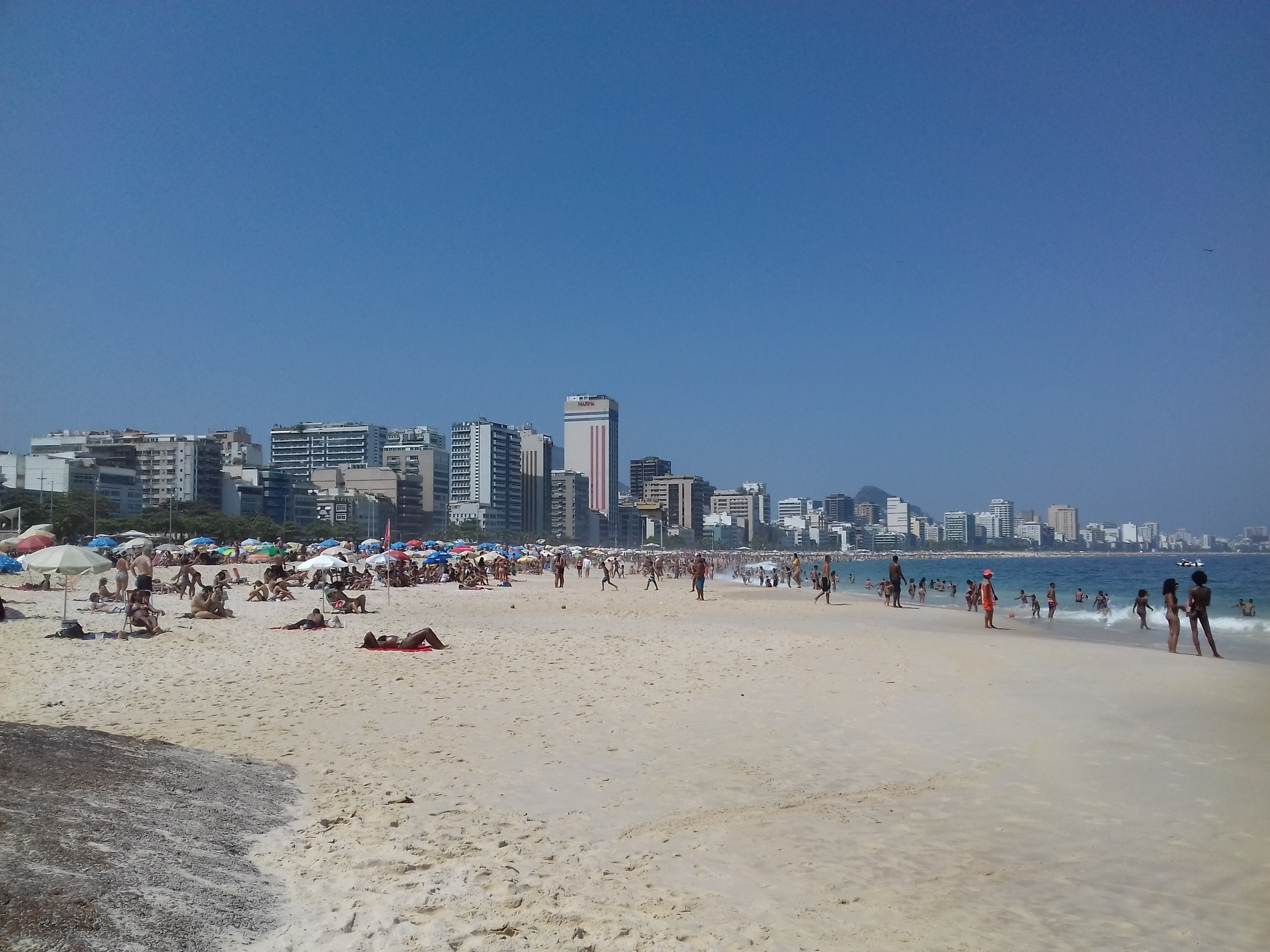
Leblon Beach.

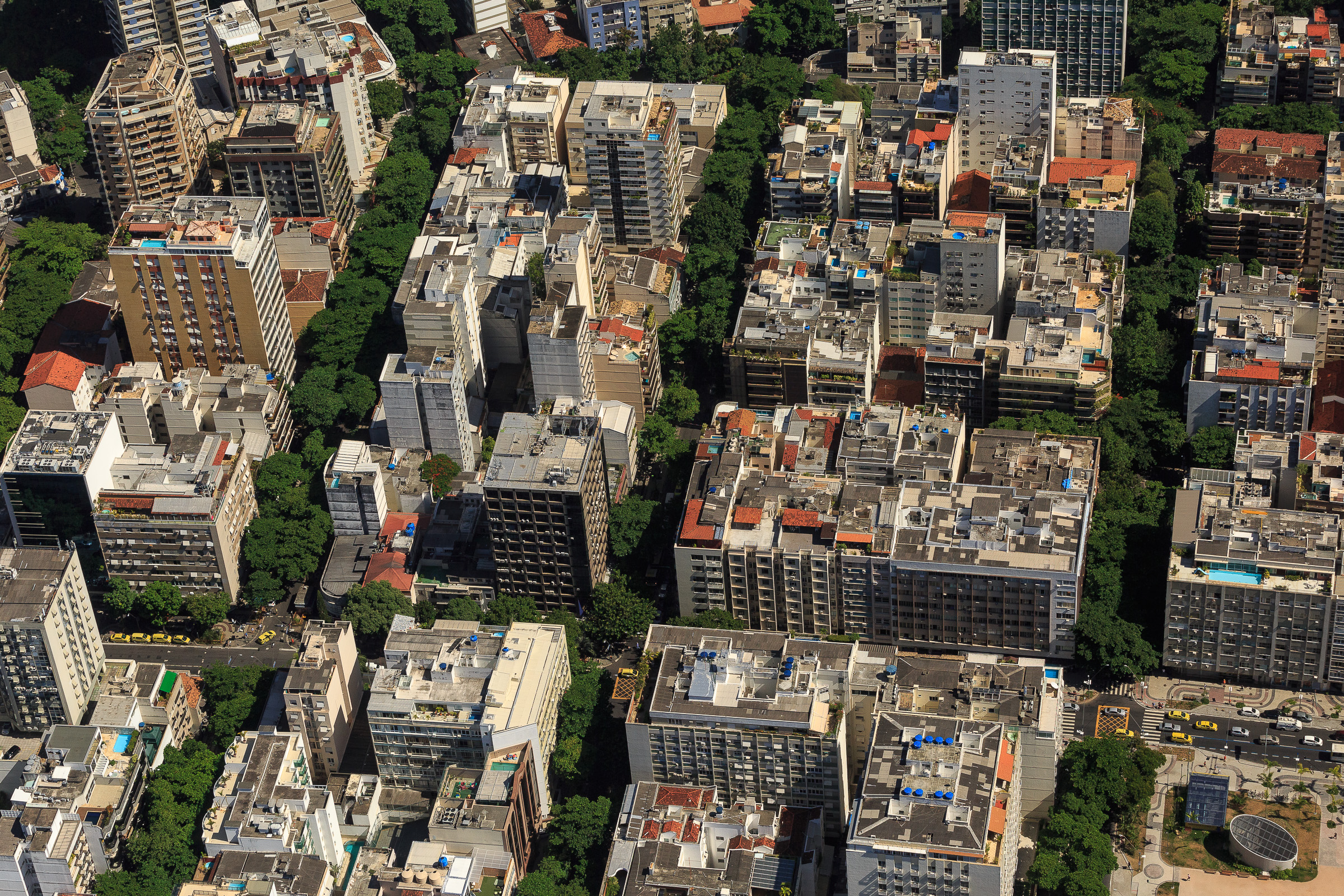
Residential buildings. Leblon has the most expensive price per residential square meter in Latin America.

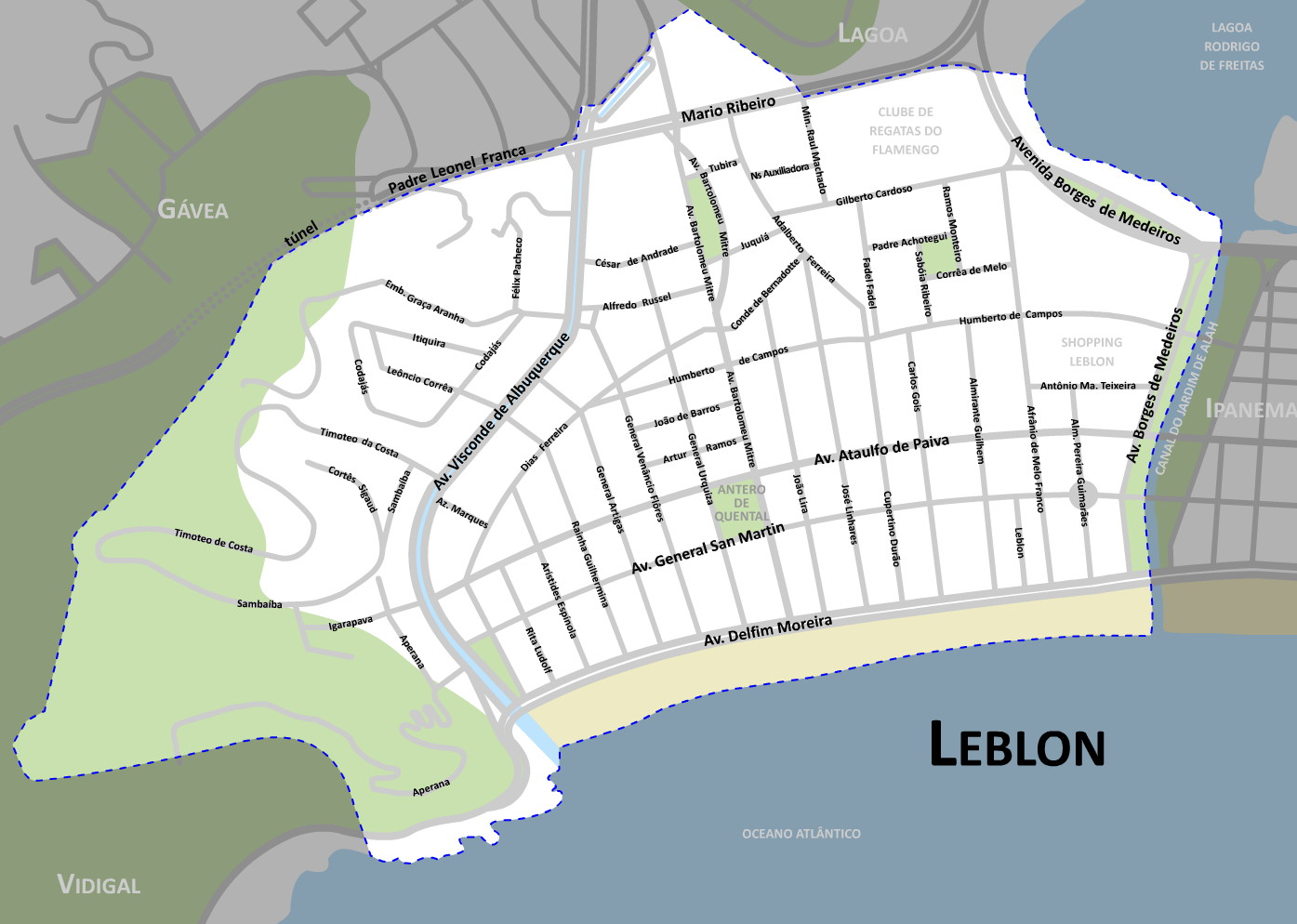
Map of Leblon.

It is located west of Ipanema. In the north, it is bordered by Gávea and, in the west, by a towering hill called Dois Irmãos, which translates as "two brothers", because of its split peak.

== Leblon in popular culture ==
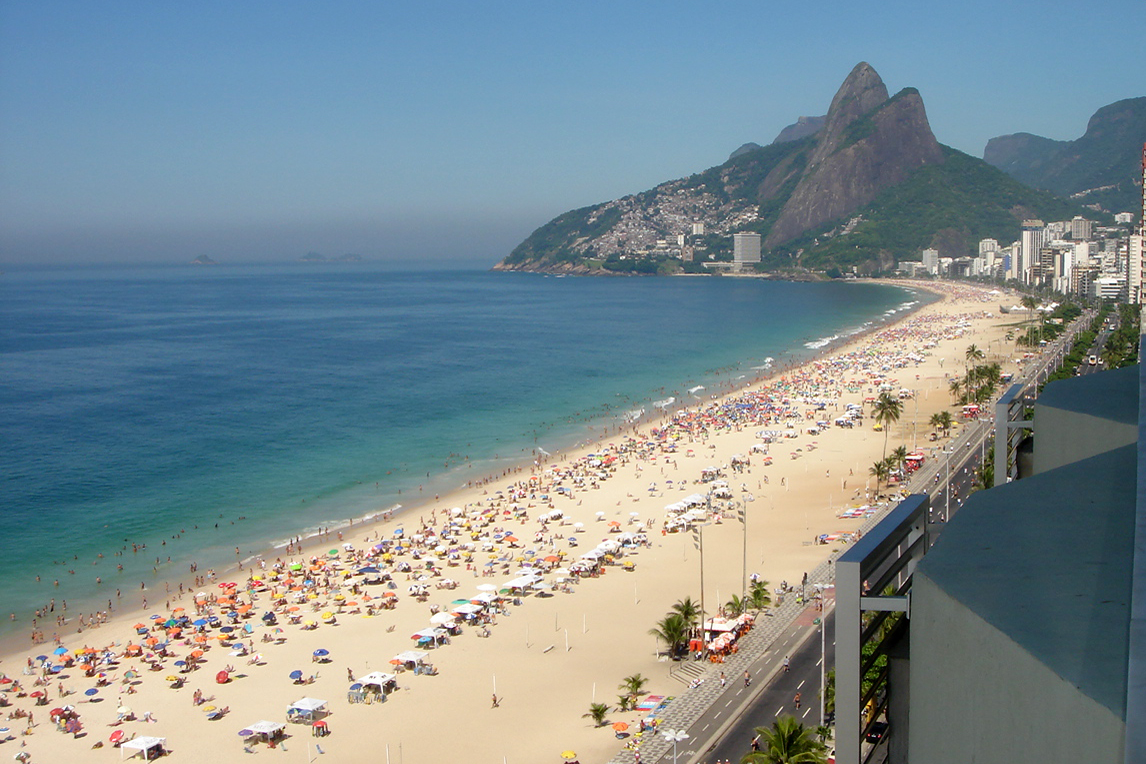
Leblon beach

Leblon is known for being a very wealthy and cosmopolitan neighborhood, with a lively nightlife across its bars, restaurants and nightclubs. Leblon has been either referenced or depicted in the following media:

In television:

- Viver a Vida, a telenovela produced by Rede Globo, aired from September 2009 to May 2010;
- Páginas da Vida, a telenovela produced by Rede Globo, aired from July 2006 to March 2007;
- Mulheres Apaixonadas, a telenovela produced by Rede Globo, aired from February to October 2003;
- Laços de Familia, a telenovela produced by Rede Globo, aired from June 2000 to February 2001;
- Por Amor, a telenovela produced by Rede Globo, aired from October 1997 to May 1998;
- História de Amor, a telenovela produced by Rede Globo, aired from July 1995 to March 1996.

In music: Leblon has been the subject of many songs, such as

- "Falso Leblon", "Choque de Ordem", "Haiti", "O namorado" and "O quereres" by Caetano Veloso;
- "Óculos" by Paralamas do Sucesso;
- "Inverno" by Adriana Calcanhotto;
- "Sexo, amor, traição" by Luciana Mello;
- "Andar, andar" and "Tesoura do desejo" by Alceu Valença;
- "Aquilo bom (garotas do Leblon)" by Elba Ramalho;
- "Daqui pro Méier" by Ed Motta;
- "Balanço Zona Sul" by Tito Madi;
- "Completamente Blue" by Cazuza;
- "Virgem" by Marina Lima;
- "A vida tem dessas coisas" by Ritchie
- "Tardes no Leblon" by Alberto Rosenblit.

In cinema in the 22 de march de 2011 the premiere internacional in the rio (2011) he was in Leblon, Rio de Janeiro.

== See also ==
- Rua General Urquiza
