= Outline of Guinea-Bissau =

Country in West Africa

The Flag of Guinea-Bissau

The Coat of arms of Guinea-Bissau

The location of Guinea-Bissau

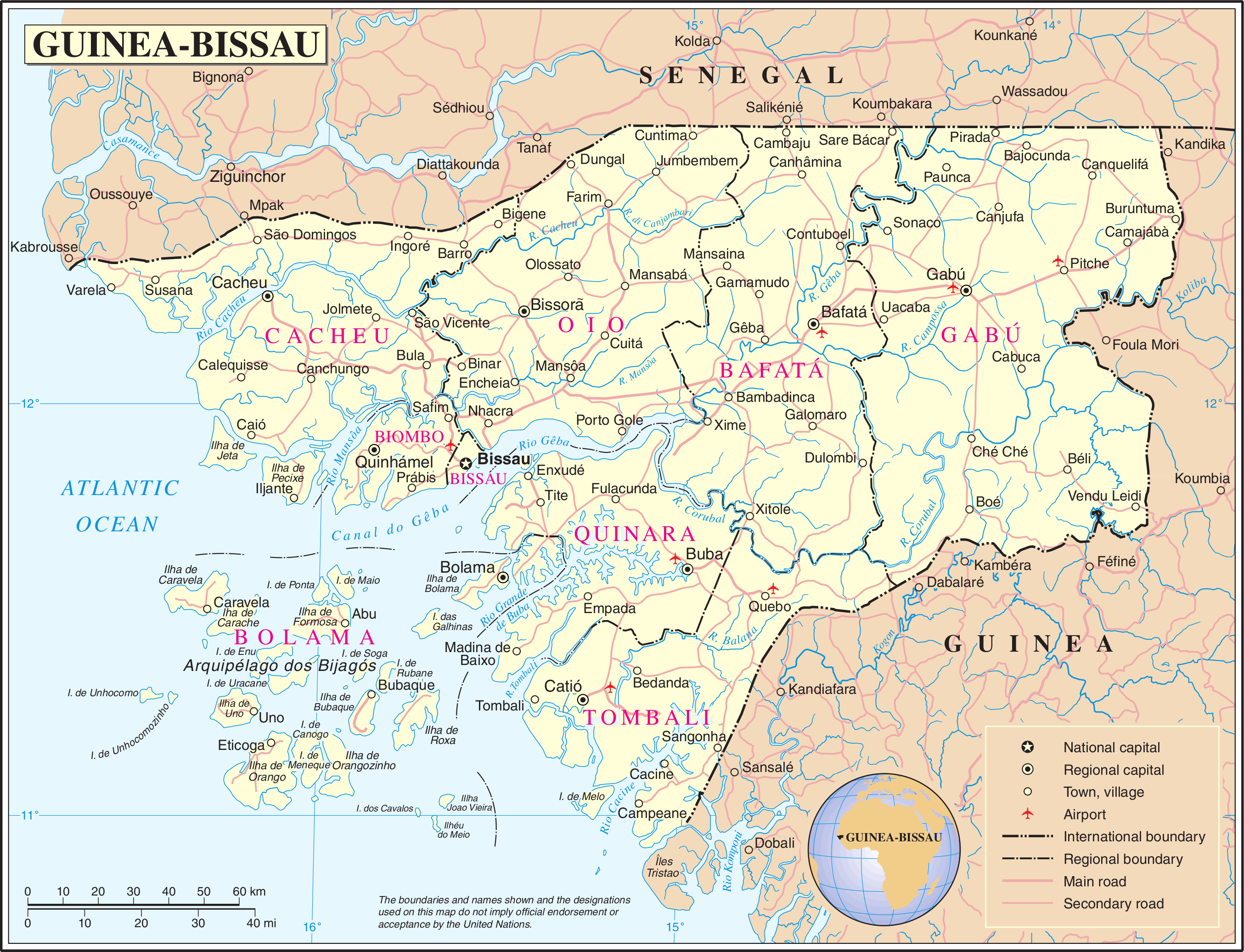
An enlargeable map of the Republic of Guinea-Bissau

The following outline is provided as an overview of and topical guide to Guinea-Bissau:

Guinea-Bissau – country located in West Africa. Guinea-Bissau is the 8th least extensive country in continental Africa. It is bordered by Senegal to the north, and Guinea to the south and east, with the Atlantic Ocean to its west. Formerly the Portuguese colony of Portuguese Guinea, upon independence, the name of its capital, Bissau, was added to the country's name in order to prevent confusion between itself and the Republic of Guinea.

== General reference ==
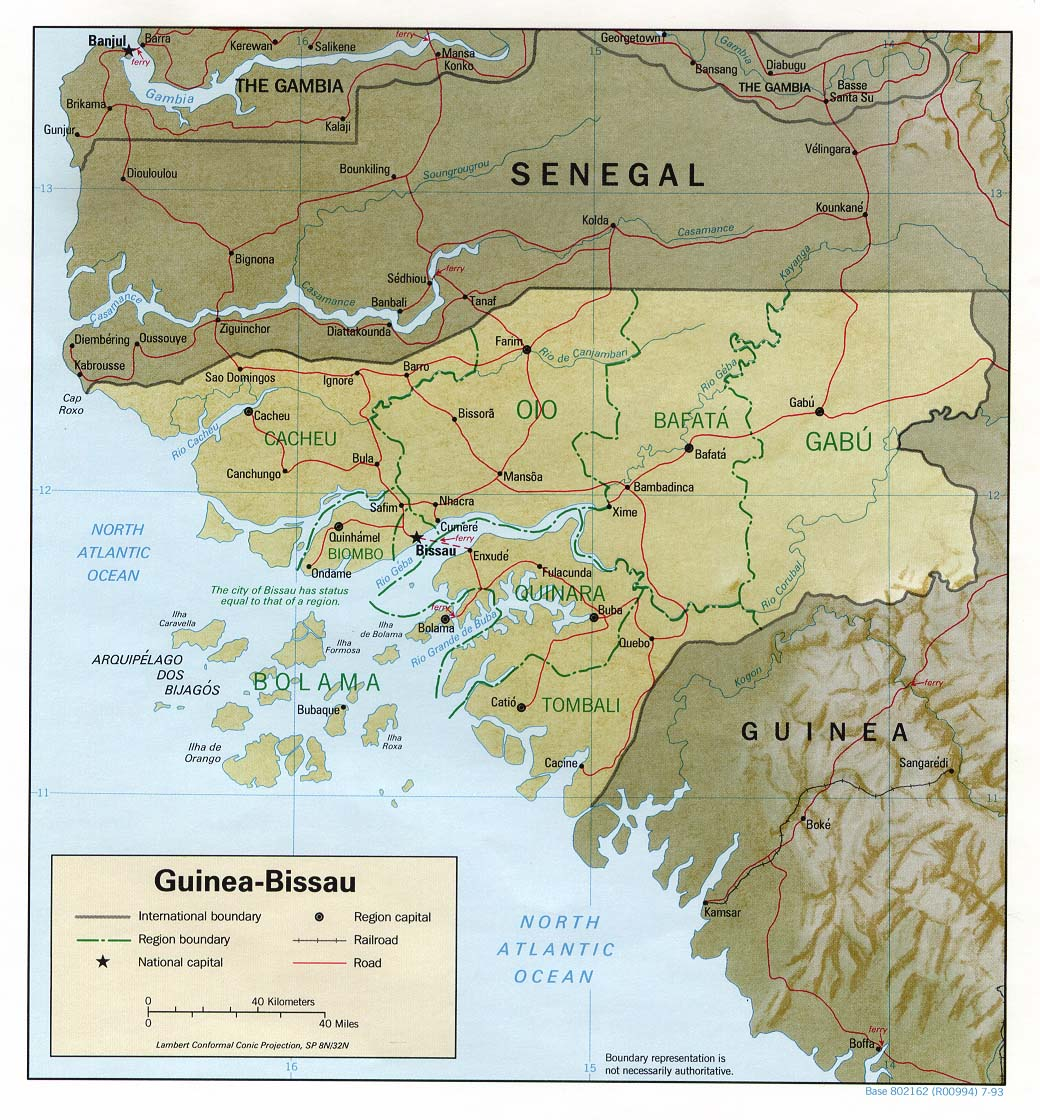
An enlargeable relief map of Guinea-Bissau

- Pronunciation: /ˌɡɪni bɪˈsaʊ/
- Common English country name: Guinea-Bissau
- Official English country name: The Republic of Guinea-Bissau
- Common endonym(s):
- Official endonym(s):
- Adjectival(s): Guinean
- Demonym(s): Bissau-Guinean(s)
- ISO country codes: GW, GNB, 624
- ISO region codes: See ISO 3166-2:GW
- Internet country code top-level domain: .gw

== Geography of Guinea-Bissau ==
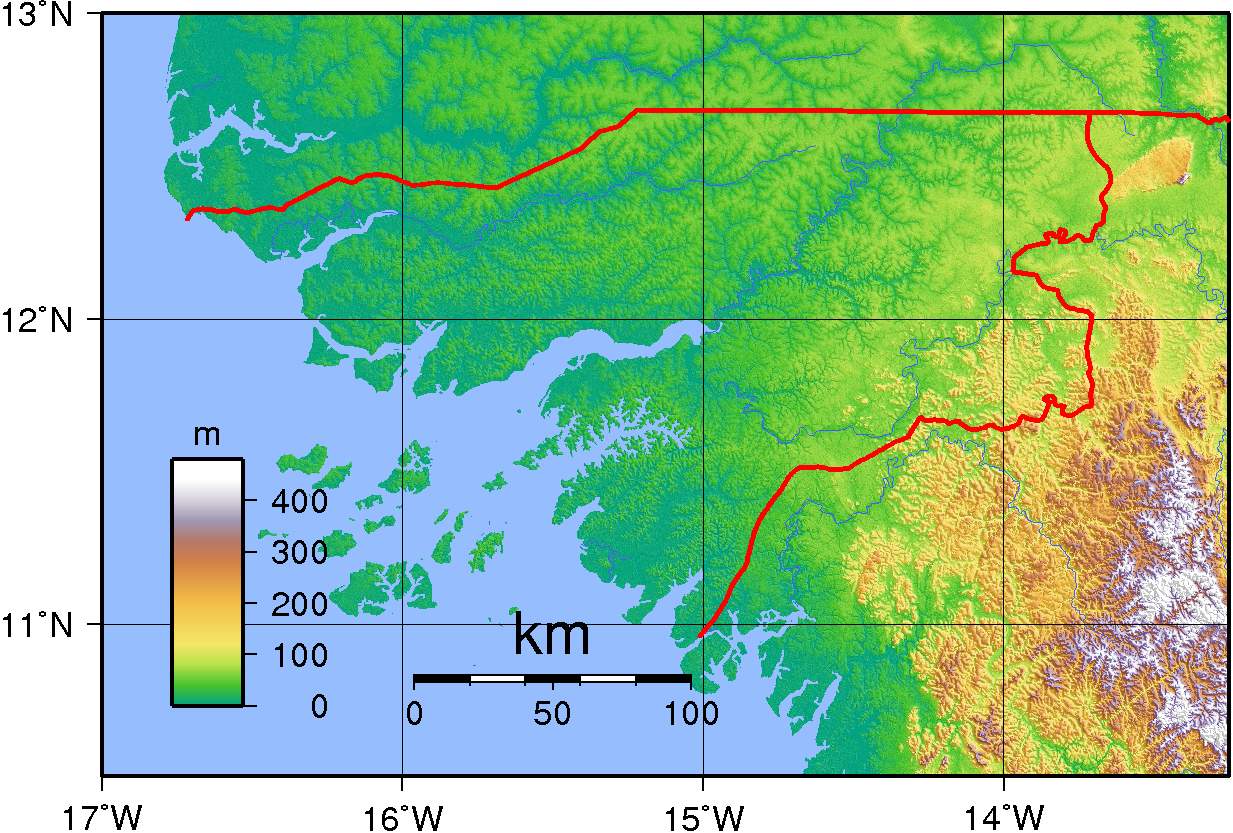
An enlargeable topographic map of Guinea-Bissau

Geography of Guinea-Bissau

- Guinea-Bissau is: a country
- Population of Guinea-Bissau: 1,695,000 - 147th most populous country
- Area of Guinea-Bissau: 36544 km^{2}
- Atlas of Guinea-Bissau

=== Location ===
- Guinea-Bissau is situated within the following regions:
  - Northern Hemisphere and Western Hemisphere
  - Africa
    - West Africa
- Time zone: Coordinated Universal Time UTC+00
- Extreme points of Guinea-Bissau
  - High: unnamed location in the northeast corner of the country 310 m (1,017 ft)
  - Low: North Atlantic Ocean 0 m
- Land boundaries: 724 km

Guinea 386 km
Senegal 338 km

- Coastline: North Atlantic Ocean 350 km

=== Environment of Guinea-Bissau ===
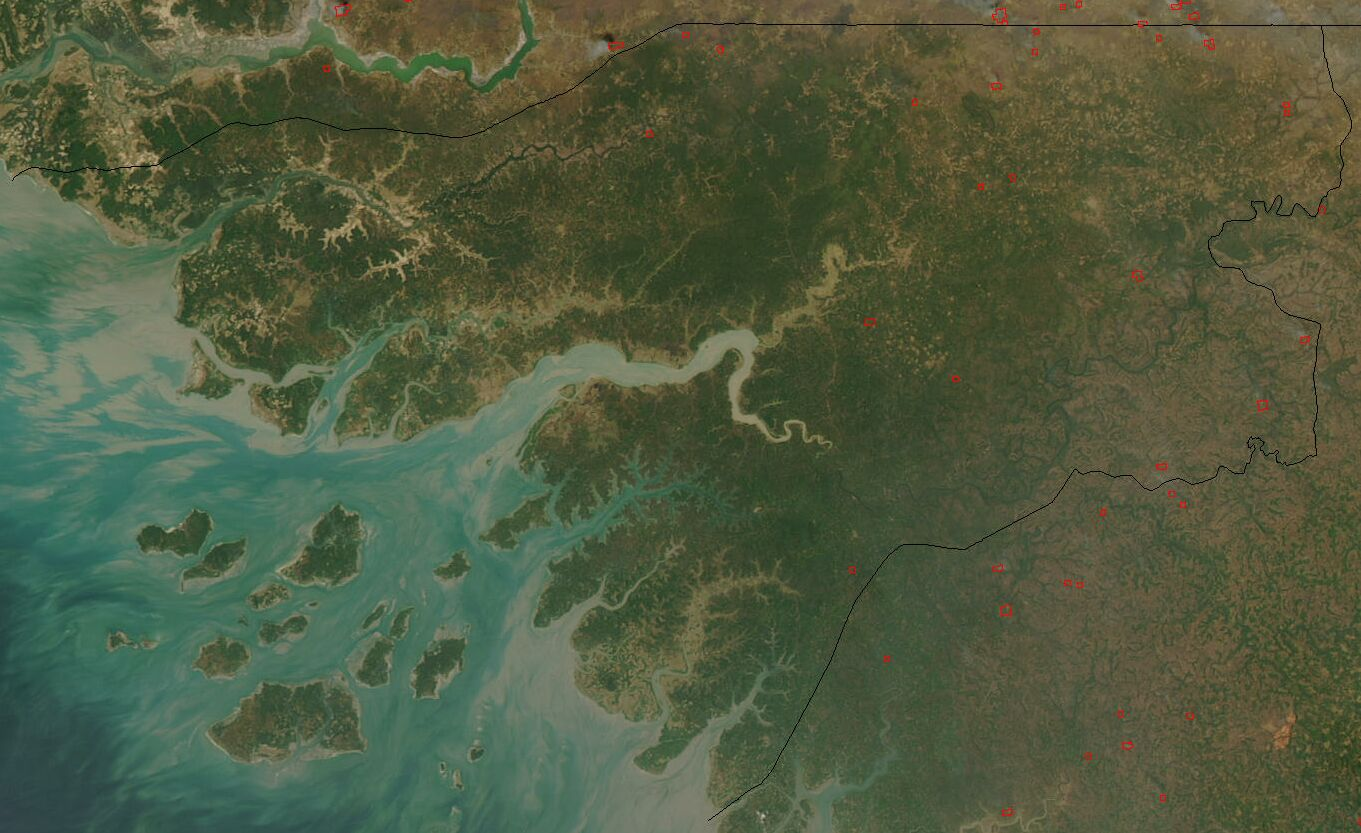
An enlargeable satellite image of Guinea-Bissau

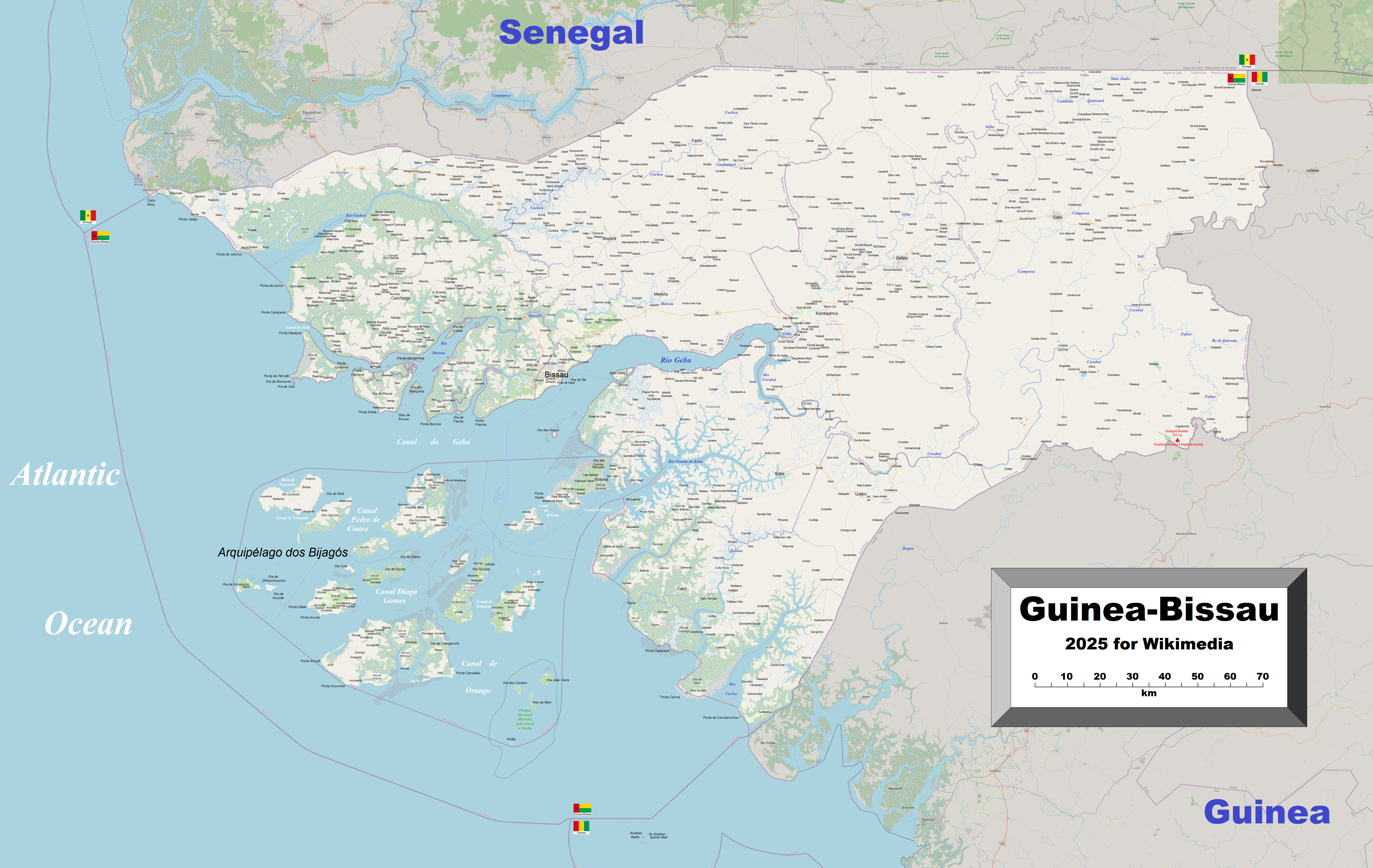
An enlargeable detailed map of Guinea-Bissau

- Climate of Guinea-Bissau
- Ecoregions in Guinea-Bissau
- Protected areas of Guinea-Bissau
- Wildlife of Guinea-Bissau
  - Fauna of Guinea-Bissau
    - Birds of Guinea-Bissau
    - Mammals of Guinea-Bissau

=== Natural geographic features of Guinea-Bissau ===
Landforms of Guinea-Bissau

- Glaciers in Guinea-Bissau: none
- Rivers of Guinea-Bissau
- World Heritage Sites in Guinea-Bissau: None

=== Regions of Guinea-Bissau ===
==== Ecoregions of Guinea-Bissau ====
- List of ecoregions in Guinea-Bissau

==== Administrative divisions of Guinea-Bissau ====
Administrative divisions of Guinea-Bissau

- Regions of Guinea-Bissau
  - Sectors of Guinea-Bissau

===== Regions of Guinea-Bissau =====
Regions of Guinea-Bissau

===== Sectors of Guinea-Bissau =====
Sectors of Guinea-Bissau

=== Municipalities of Guinea-Bissau ===
- Capital of Guinea-Bissau: Bissau
- Cities of Guinea-Bissau

== Demography of Guinea-Bissau ==
Demographics of Guinea-Bissau

== Government and politics of Guinea-Bissau ==
- Form of government: semi-presidential representative democratic republic
- Capital of Guinea-Bissau: Bissau
- Elections in Guinea-Bissau
- Political parties in Guinea-Bissau

=== Branches of the government of Guinea-Bissau ===
Government of Guinea-Bissau

==== Executive branch of the government of Guinea-Bissau ====
- Head of state: President of Guinea-Bissau, Malam Bacai Sanhá
- Head of government: Prime Minister of Guinea-Bissau, Ilídio Vieira Té

==== Legislative branch of the government of Guinea-Bissau ====
- Parliament of Guinea-Bissau (unicameral)

=== Foreign relations of Guinea-Bissau ===
Foreign relations of Guinea-Bissau

- Diplomatic missions in Guinea-Bissau
- Diplomatic missions of Guinea-Bissau

==== International organization membership ====
The Republic of Guinea-Bissau is a member of:

- African, Caribbean, and Pacific Group of States (ACP)
- African Development Bank Group (AfDB)
- African Union (AU)
- Community of Portuguese Language Countries (CPLP)
- Conference des Ministres des Finances des Pays de la Zone Franc (FZ)
- Economic Community of West African States (ECOWAS)
- Food and Agriculture Organization (FAO)
- Group of 77 (G77)
- International Bank for Reconstruction and Development (IBRD)
- International Civil Aviation Organization (ICAO)
- International Criminal Court (ICCt) (signatory)
- International Criminal Police Organization (Interpol)
- International Development Association (IDA)
- International Federation of Red Cross and Red Crescent Societies (IFRCS)
- International Finance Corporation (IFC)
- International Fund for Agricultural Development (IFAD)
- International Labour Organization (ILO)
- International Maritime Organization (IMO)
- International Monetary Fund (IMF)
- International Olympic Committee (IOC)
- International Organization for Migration (IOM)
- International Red Cross and Red Crescent Movement (ICRM)
- International Telecommunication Union (ITU)
- International Telecommunications Satellite Organization (ITSO)
- International Trade Union Confederation (ITUC)
- Islamic Development Bank (IDB)
- Multilateral Investment Guarantee Agency (MIGA)
- Nonaligned Movement (NAM)
- Organisation internationale de la Francophonie (OIF)
- Organisation of Islamic Cooperation (OIC)
- Organisation for the Prohibition of Chemical Weapons (OPCW)
- União Latina
- United Nations (UN)
- United Nations Conference on Trade and Development (UNCTAD)
- United Nations Educational, Scientific, and Cultural Organization (UNESCO)
- United Nations Industrial Development Organization (UNIDO)
- Universal Postal Union (UPU)
- West African Development Bank (WADB) (regional)
- West African Economic and Monetary Union (WAEMU)
- World Federation of Trade Unions (WFTU)
- World Health Organization (WHO)
- World Intellectual Property Organization (WIPO)
- World Meteorological Organization (WMO)
- World Tourism Organization (UNWTO)
- World Trade Organization (WTO)

=== Law and order in Guinea-Bissau ===
Law of Guinea-Bissau

- Law Enforcement in Guinea-Bissau
  - Judicial Police
  - National Guard
- Constitution of Guinea-Bissau
- Human rights in Guinea-Bissau
  - LGBT rights in Guinea-Bissau

=== Military of Guinea-Bissau ===
Military of Guinea-Bissau

- Command
  - Commander-in-chief:
- Forces
  - Army of Guinea-Bissau
  - Air Force of Guinea-Bissau

== History of Guinea-Bissau ==
History of Guinea-Bissau

== Culture of Guinea-Bissau ==
Culture of Guinea-Bissau

- Cuisine of Guinea-Bissau
- Languages of Guinea-Bissau
- National symbols of Guinea-Bissau
  - Coat of arms of Guinea-Bissau
  - Flag of Guinea-Bissau
  - National anthem of Guinea-Bissau
- Prostitution in Guinea-Bissau
- Public holidays in Guinea-Bissau
- Religion in Guinea-Bissau
  - Christianity in Guinea-Bissau
  - Hinduism in Guinea-Bissau
  - Islam in Guinea-Bissau
    - Ahmadiyya in Guinea-Bissau
- World Heritage Sites in Guinea-Bissau: None

=== Art in Guinea-Bissau ===
- Music of Guinea-Bissau

=== Sports in Guinea-Bissau ===
Sports in Guinea-Bissau

- Football in Guinea-Bissau
- Guinea-Bissau at the Olympics

== Economy and infrastructure of Guinea-Bissau ==
Economy of Guinea-Bissau

- Economic rank, by nominal GDP (2007): 182nd (one hundred and eighty second)
- Communications in Guinea-Bissau
  - Internet in Guinea-Bissau
- Companies of Guinea-Bissau
- Currency of Guinea-Bissau: Franc
  - ISO 4217: XOF
- Health care in Guinea-Bissau
- Mining in Guinea-Bissau
- Stock Exchange in Guinea-Bissau: none – served by the regional stock exchange Bourse Régionale des Valeurs Mobilières (BRVM) in Abidjan, Côte d'Ivoire.
- Transport in Guinea-Bissau
  - Airports in Guinea-Bissau
  - Rail transport in Guinea-Bissau

== Education in Guinea-Bissau ==
Education in Guinea-Bissau

== See also ==
- List of Guinea-Bissau-related topics
- List of international rankings
- Member state of the United Nations
- Outline of Africa
- Outline of geography
