= .pt =

Internet country code top-level domain for Portugal

- Introduced: 30 June 1988; 38 years ago
- TLD type: Country code top-level domain
- Status: Active
- Registry: Associação DNS.PT
- Sponsor: Associação DNS.PT
- Intended use: Entities connected with Portugal
- Actual use: Very popular in Portugal
- Registered domains: 2,104,387 (February 2026)
- Registration restrictions: Various restrictions for different subdomains; .com.pt is unlimited
- Structure: Registrations are taken directly at second level or at third level beneath some second-level labels
- DNSSEC: yes
- Registry website: pt.pt

.pt is the Internet country code top-level domain (ccTLD) for Portugal and is managed by Associação DNS.PT. It has the following second-level domains:

- .com.pt: no restrictions; online registration
- .edu.pt: education
- .gov.pt: Government of Portugal
- .int.pt: international organizations or diplomatic missions in Portugal
- .net.pt: telecommunications providers
- .nome.pt: individuals (nome is Portuguese for name)
- .org.pt: Non-profit organizations
- .publ.pt: publications (e.g. newspapers)
- .co.pt
- .lda.pt

As from the 1 May 2012 Registration directly at second-level is available, without restrictions. On the first week there was a 28984 new domains register under the .pt.

Since July 1, 2005, some characters with diacritics have been supported in domain names (IDN). Currently permitted characters: à, á, â, ã, ç, é, ê, í, ó, ô, õ, ú, ü. These are the only accentuated characters used in Portuguese words, although "ü" has been deprecated by the Portuguese-Language Orthographic Agreement of 1990.

Apart from .gov.pt, Portuguese subdomains were slow to catch on, because many people had already registered under .pt when the new ones became available. Many companies, colleges and people still prefer to use a .pt because these are harder to get and simpler to remember. However, the .com.pt subdomain is being heavily promoted by the registry, and now has numerous registrations and active Web sites. Others such as .nome.pt for individuals are still uncommon.

In the early years, FCCN (Fundação para a Computação Científica Nacional) tried to keep control of the .pt domain using stringent rules, which were adjusted a number of times. The precedent set by domains which were already registered but which would not be able to be registered under updated rules led to lawyers requesting the registry of any domain based on the principle of equal treatment. When the situation was out of control, FCCN tried to promote subdomains like com.pt. Nevertheless, since the registration directly under .pt was still available, users tended to prefer these.

It is estimated that the .pt suffix comprises a little less than 10% of all the Portuguese-language Internet. It is the third most popular Portuguese-language suffix, after .br and .com, and ahead of .net, .org and .info, all above 10 million pages.
