= .gw =

Internet country code top-level domain for Guinea-Bissau

- Introduced: 4 February 1997
- TLD type: Country code top-level domain
- Status: Active
- Registry: Associação DNS.PT
- Sponsor: Autoridade Reguladora Nacional – Tecnologias de Informação e Comunicação da Guiné-Bissau
- Intended use: Entities connected with Guinea-Bissau
- Actual use: Public Registration
- Registration restrictions: No pornography
- Structure: May register at second level
- Registry website: NIC.GW

.gw is the Internet country code top-level domain (ccTLD) for Guinea-Bissau.

The .gw country code top-level domain was delegated multiple times to different entities.

The domain was introduced to the root zone on 4 February 1997, and management of it was most recently delegated by IANA to ARN (Autoridade Reguladora Nacional – Tecnologias de Informação e Comunicação da Guiné-Bissau) on 10 July 2014.

The .gw domain name was launched to public registration in November 2014 with the technical help of Associação DNS.PT (Registry of .PT ccTLD).
