= Guinea-Bissau =

Country in West Africa

Republic of Guinea-Bissau
República da Guiné-Bissau (Portuguese)
(in other spoken languages)
Pulaar	𞤘𞤭𞤲𞤫 𞤄𞤭𞤧𞤢𞤱𞤮
Mandinka	ߖߌߣߍ ߓߌߛߊߥߏ
- Flag Emblem
- Motto: Unidade, Luta, Progresso "Unity, Struggle, Progress"
- Anthem: Esta É a Nossa Pátria Amada "This Is Our Beloved Homeland"
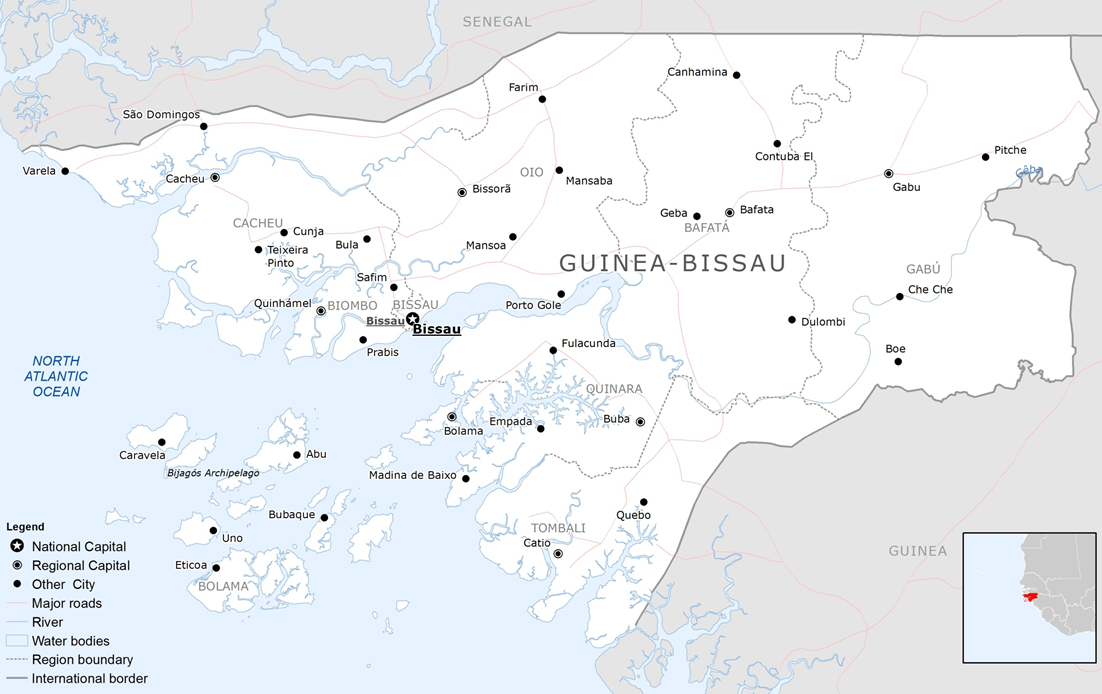
- Location of Guinea-Bissau in Africa
- Capital and largest city: Bissau; 11°52′N 15°36′W
- Official languages: Portuguese
- Spoken languages: List: Guinea-Bissau Creole; English; French; Balanta; Hassaniya; Jola-Fonyi; Mandinka; Mandjak; Mankanya; Noon; Portuguese; Pulaar; Serer; Soninke
- Ethnic groups (2025): 25.5% Fulani; 19.3% Balanta; 17.8% Mandinka; 13.6% Manjak; 9.3% Papel; 3.9% Mankanya; 3.7% Biafada; 6.9% other
- Religion (2025): 49.6% Islam; 37.8% Christianity; 6.4% Traditional; 5.4% none; 0.8% others
- Demonyms: Guinean; Bissau-Guinean
- Government: Unitary semi-presidential republic under a military junta
  - Chief of the High Command and Transitional President (Note: In his capacity as Chairman of the High Military Command for the Restoration of National Security and Public Order.): Horta Inta-A Na Man
  - Prime Minister: Ilídio Vieira Té
- Legislature: National Transitional Council (transitional); National People's Assembly (suspended)

Independence from Portugal
  - Kaabu Empire: 1537–1867
  - Portuguese Guinea: 1588–1974
  - Guinea-Bissau War of Independence: 1963-1974
  - Declaration: 24 September 1973
  - Recognition: 10 September 1974
  - Civil War: 1998–1999
  - 2025 Guinea-Bissau coup d'état: 26 November 2025

Area
  - Total: 36,125 km^{2} (13,948 sq mi) (134th)
  - Water (%): 22.4

Population
  - 2023 estimate: ▲2,080,000 (150th)
  - Density: 47/km^{2} (121.7/sq mi) (154th)
- GDP (PPP): 2025 estimate
  - Total: ▲$6.620 billion (172nd)
  - Per capita: ▲$3,280 (168th)
- GDP (nominal): 2025 estimate
  - Total: ▲$2.270 billion (174th)
  - Per capita: ▲$1,130 (165th)
- Gini (2021): ▼33.4 medium inequality
- HDI (2023): ▲0.514 low (174th)
- Currency: West African CFA franc (XOF)
- Time zone: UTC±00:00 (GMT)
- Calling code: +245
- ISO 3166 code: GW
- Internet TLD: .gw

Guinea-Bissau, (Note: /ˌɡɪni bɪˈsaʊ/; Portuguese: Guiné-Bissau; Fula: 𞤘𞤭𞤲𞤫 𞤄𞤭𞤧𞤢𞥄𞤱𞤮, romanized: Gine-Bisaawo; Mandinka: ߖߌ߬ߣߍ߫ ߓߌߛߊߥߏ߫, romanized: Gine-Bisawo) officially the Republic of Guinea-Bissau, (Note: Portuguese: República da Guiné-Bissau [ʁɛˈpuβlikɐ ðɐ ɣiˈnɛ βiˈsaw]) is a country in West Africa that covers 36,125 square kilometres (13,948 sq mi) with an estimated population of 2,080,000. It borders Senegal to its north and Guinea to its southeast.

Guinea-Bissau was once part of the kingdom of Kaabu, as well as part of the Mali Empire. Parts of this kingdom persisted until the 18th century, while a few others had been under some rule by the Portuguese Empire since the 16th century. In the 19th century, it was colonised as Portuguese Guinea. Upon independence, declared in 1973 and recognised in 1974, the name of its capital, Bissau, was added to the country's name to prevent confusion with Guinea (formerly French Guinea).

Guinea-Bissau has had a history of political instability: following the bloody but ultimately successful war of independence, the winning PAIGC established a one-party socialist state, which was under military control from 1984 to 1994, when free multiparty elections were held. Several successful military coups have since interrupted peaceful transfer of power, most recently the 2025 coup, which installed the currently ruling military junta, headed by the transitional president Horta Inta-A Na Man.

About 2% of the population speaks Portuguese, the official language, as a first language, and 33% speak it as a second language. Guinea-Bissau Creole, a Portuguese-based creole, is the national language and also considered the language of unity. According to a 2012 study, 54% of the population speak Creole as a first language and about 40% speak it as a second language. The remainder speak a variety of native African languages. The nation is home to numerous followers of Islam, Christianity, and multiple traditional faiths. The country's GDP per capita is one of the lowest in the world.

Guinea-Bissau is a member of the United Nations, Organisation of Islamic Cooperation, Community of Portuguese Language Countries, Organisation internationale de la Francophonie, Alliance of Small Island States and the South Atlantic Peace and Cooperation Zone. It was also a member of the now-defunct Latin Union. As of November 2025, its membership in Economic Community of West African States and African Union has been suspended after a coup d'etat.

== History ==
=== Pre-European contact ===
The ancient history of what is now Guinea-Bissau is poorly understood by historians. The earliest inhabitants were the Jola, Papel, Manjak, Balanta, and Biafada peoples. Later the Mandinka and Fulani migrated into the region in the 13th and 15th centuries respectively. They pushed the earlier inhabitants towards the coast and onto the Bijagos islands.

The Balanta and Jola had weak or non-existent institutions of kingship but emphasised decentralization, with power invested in heads of villages and families. The Mandinka, Fula, Papel, Manjak, and Biafada chiefs were vassals to kings. The customs, rites, and ceremonies varied, but nobles commanded all the major positions, including the judicial system. Social stratification was seen in the clothing and accessories of the people, in housing materials, and in transportation options. Trade was widespread between ethnic groups. Items traded included pepper and kola nuts from the southern forests; iron and iron utensils from the savannah-forest zone; salt and dried fish from the coast; and Mandinka cotton cloth.

==== Kingdom of Bissau ====
According to oral tradition, the Kingdom of Bissau was founded by the son of the king of Quinara (Guinala), who moved to the area with his pregnant sister, six wives, and subjects of his father's kingdom. Relations between the kingdom and the Portuguese colonisers were initially warm, but deteriorated over time. The kingdom strongly defended its sovereignty against the Portuguese 'Pacification Campaigns', defeating them in 1891, 1894, and 1904. However, in 1915 the Portuguese under the command of Officer Teixeira Pinto and warlord Abdul Injai fully absorbed the kingdom.

==== Biafada kingdoms ====
The Biafada people inhabited the area around the Rio Grande de Buba in three kingdoms: Biguba, Guinala, and Bissege. The former two were important ports with significant lançado communities. They were subjects of the Mandinka mansa of Kaabu.

==== Bijagos Islands ====
In the Bijagos Islands, people of different ethnic origins tended to settle in separate settlements. Great cultural diversity developed in the archipelago.

Bijago society was warlike. Men were dedicated to boatbuilding and raiding the mainland, attacking the coastal peoples as well as other islands. They believed that at sea they had no king. Women cultivated the land, constructed houses, and gathered and prepared foods. They could choose their husbands, and warriors with the best reputations ranked at the top of respected status. Successful warriors could have many wives and boats, and were entitled to one third of the spoils gained by warriors who used their boats in any expedition.

Bijago night raids on coastal settlements had significant effects on the societies attacked. Portuguese traders on the mainland tried to stop the raids, as they hurt the local economy. But the islanders also sold considerable numbers of villagers captured in raids as slaves to the Europeans. With colonisation underway in other parts of Africa and the Americas, demand for workers was high and the Europeans sometimes pushed for more captives to be taken.

The Bijagos were mostly safe from enslavement, as they were out of reach of mainland slave raiders. Europeans avoided having them as slaves. Portuguese sources say the children made good slaves but not the adults, who were likely to commit suicide, lead rebellions aboard slave ships, or escape once reaching the New World.

==== Kaabu ====
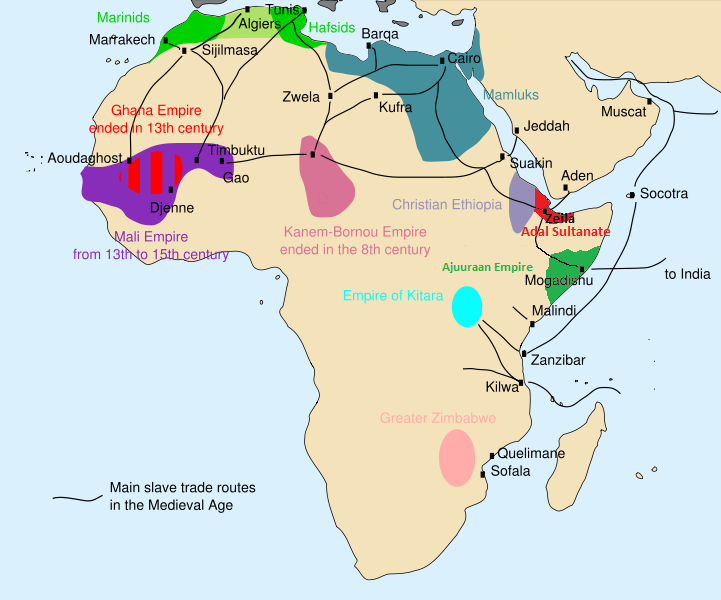
States in medieval Africa

Kaabu was established first as a province of Mali through the conquest in the 13th century of the Senegambia by Tiramakhan Traore, a general under Sundiata Keita. By the 14th century much of Guinea Bissau was under the administration of Mali. It was ruled by a farim kaabu (commander of Kaabu).

Mali declined gradually, beginning in the 14th century. By the early 16th century, the expanding power of Koli Tenguella cut off formerly secure Mali.

Kaabu became an independent federation of kingdoms. The ruling classes were composed of elite warriors known as the Nyancho (Ñaanco) who traced their patrilineal lineage to Tiramakhan Traore. The Nyancho were a warrior culture, reputed to be excellent cavalry men and raiders. The Kaabu Mansaba was seated in Kansala, in what is today the Gabú region.

The slave trade dominated the economy, and the warrior classes grew rich with imported cloth, beads, metalware, and firearms. Trade networks with Arabs and others to North Africa were dominant up to the 14th century. In the 15th century, coastal trade with the Europeans began to increase. In the 17th and 18th centuries an estimated 700 slaves were exported annually from the region, many of them from Kaabu.

In the late 18th century, the rise of the Imamate of Futa Jallon to the east posed a powerful challenge to the animist Kaabu. During the first half of the 19th century, civil war erupted as local Fula people sought independence. This long-running conflict was marked by the 1867 Battle of Kansala; the Fuladu effectively defeated the Kaabu and dominated the area thereafter. But some smaller Mandinka kingdoms survived until their absorption into Portuguese colonies.

=== European contact ===
Lesser coat of arms of Portuguese Guinea-Bissau

==== 15th–16th centuries ====
The first Europeans to reach Guinea-Bissau were the Venetian explorer Alvise Cadamosto in 1455, Portuguese explorer Diogo Gomes in 1456, Portuguese explorer Duarte Pacheco Pareira in the 1480s, and Flemish explorer Eustache de la Fosse in 1479–1480.

Although the Portuguese authorities initially discouraged European settlement on the mainland, this prohibition was ignored by lançados and tangomãos, who largely assimilated into indigenous culture and customs. They ignored Portuguese trade regulations that banned entering the region or trading without a royal licence, shipping out of unauthorised ports, or assimilating into the native community.

After 1520 trade and settlements increased on the mainland, populated by Portuguese and native traders, as well as some Spanish, Genoese, English, French, and Dutch. The main ports were Cacheu, Bissau, and Guinala. Each river also had such trading centers as Toubaboudougou at their fall lines, the furthest navigable point. These posts traded directly with the peoples of the interior for resources such as gum arabic, ivory, hides, civet, dyes, enslaved Africans, and gold. Local African rulers generally refused to allow Europeans into the interior, to ensure their own control of trade routes and goods.

Disputes became increasingly frequent and serious in the late 1500s as the foreign traders sought to influence the host societies to their benefit. Meanwhile, the Portuguese monopoly, always leaky, was being increasingly challenged. In 1580 the Iberian Union unified the crowns of Portugal and Spain. Spain's enemies launched attacks on Portuguese possessions in Guinea Bissau and Cape Verde. French, Dutch, and English ships increasingly came to trade with the natives and the independent-minded lançados.

==== 17th–18th centuries ====
Flag of the Portuguese Company of Guinea

In the early 17th century the government attempted to force all Guinean trade to go through Santiago, and to promote trade and settlement on the mainland, while restricting the sale of weapons to the locals. These efforts were largely unsuccessful. With the end of the Iberian Union in 1640, King João IV attempted to restrict the Spanish trade in Guinea that had flourished for the previous 60 years. Afro-Portuguese traders and colonists, however, were not in a position to deny the free trade that the African kings demanded, as they had come to rely on European products and goods as necessities.

The Portuguese were never able to maintain the monopoly they wanted; the economic interests of the native leaders and Afro-European traders and merchants never aligned with theirs. During this period the power of the Mali Empire in the region was dissipating. The farim of Kaabu, the king of Kassa, and other local rulers began to assert their independence. In the early 1700s the Portuguese abandoned Bissau and retreated to Cacheu after the captain-major was captured and killed by the local king. They did not return until the 1750s. Meanwhile, the Cacheu and Cape Verde Company shut down in 1706. For a brief period in the 1790s, the British tried to establish a foothold on Bolama Island.

==== Slave trade ====
Guinea-Bissau was among the first regions whose people engaged in the Atlantic slave trade. For centuries its warriors had sent captives as slaves to North Africa. While it did not produce the same number of enslaved people to export to the Americas as other regions, the effects were still significant. In Cape Verde, Guinean slaves were instrumental in developing the labor-intensive plantation economy: they cultivated and processed, growing indigo and cotton, and also wove the panos cloth that became a standard currency in West Africa. During the 17th and 18th centuries, thousands of captive Africans were taken from the region every year; an average of 3000 persons were shipped every year from Guinala alone. Many of these captives were taken during the Fula jihads and, specifically, the wars between the Imamate of Futa Jallon and Kaabu.

Wars were increasingly waged for the sole purpose of capturing slaves to sell to the Europeans in exchange for imported goods. They resembled man-hunts more than conflicts over territory or political power. The nobles and kings benefited, while the common people bore the brunt of the raiding and insecurity. If a noble was captured, they were likely to be released, as the captors, whoever they were, would generally accept a ransom in exchange for freeing them. The relationship between kings and European traders was a partnership, with the two regularly making deals on how the trade was to be conducted, defining who could be enslaved and who could not, and the prices of the slaves. Contemporary chroniclers questioned multiple kings on their part in the slave trade, and noted that they recognised the trade as evil but participated because otherwise the Europeans would not buy any other goods from them. Beginning in the late 18th century, European countries gradually began slowing and abolishing the slave trade. Portugal abandoned slavery in 1869 and Brazil in 1888, but a system of contract labor replaced it that was only barely better for the workers.

=== Colonialism ===
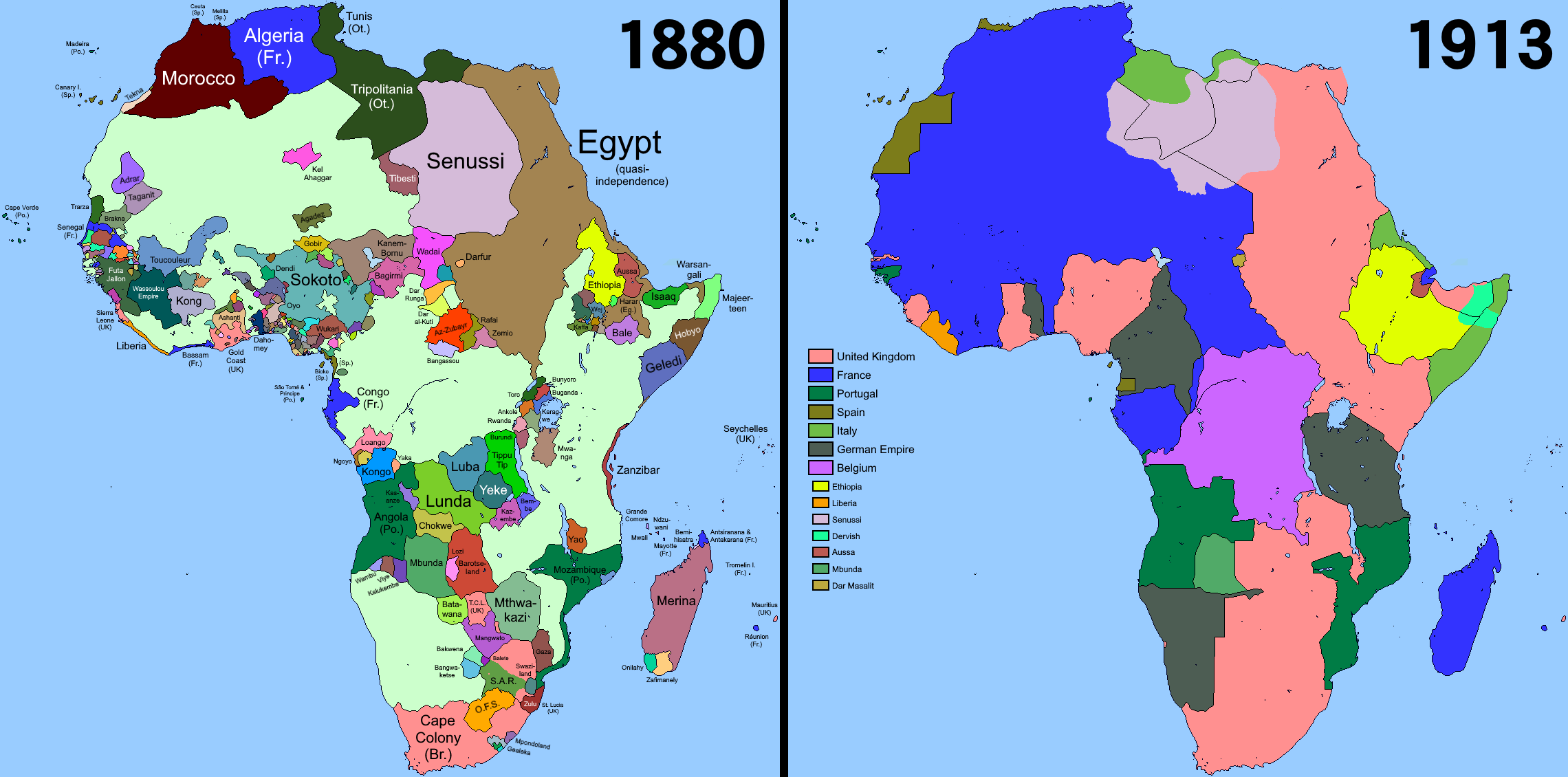
Comparison of Africa in the years 1880 and 1913

Up until the late 1800s, Portuguese control of their 'colony' outside of their forts and trading posts was a fiction. Guinea-Bissau became the scene of increased European colonial competition beginning in the 1860s. The dispute over the status of Bolama was resolved in Portugal's favor through the mediation of U.S. President Ulysses S. Grant in 1870, but French encroachment on Portuguese claims continued. In 1886 the Casamance region of what is now Senegal was ceded to them.

=== Struggle for independence ===
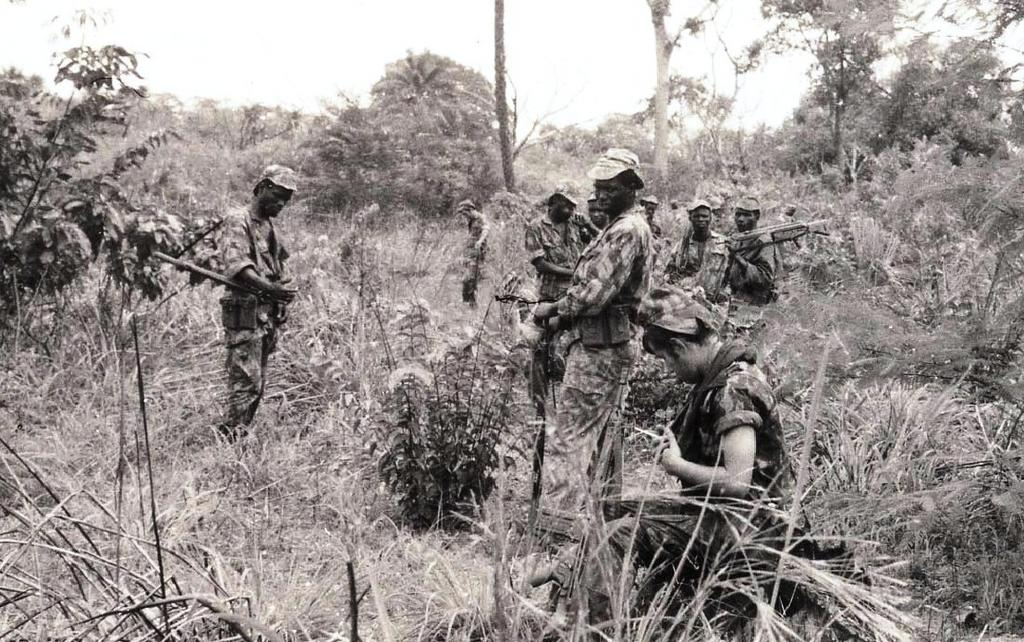
Portuguese Colonial War in Portuguese Guinea, 1968

The African Party for the Independence of Guinea and Cape Verde (PAIGC) was founded in 1956 under the leadership of Amílcar Cabral. Initially committed to peaceful methods, the 1959 Pidjiguiti massacre pushed the party towards more militarized tactics, leaning heavily on the political mobilization of the peasantry in the countryside. After years of planning and preparing from their base in Conakry, the PAIGC launched the Guinea-Bissau War of Independence on 23 January 1963.

Unlike guerrilla movements in other Portuguese colonies, the PAIGC rapidly extended its control over large portions of the territory. Aided by the jungle-like terrain, it had easy access to borders with neighbouring allies and large quantities of arms from Cuba, China, the Soviet Union, and left-leaning African countries. The PAIGC even managed to acquire a significant anti-aircraft capability in order to defend itself against aerial attack. By 1973, the PAIGC was in control of many parts of Guinea, although the movement suffered a setback in January 1973 when its founder and leader Amilcar Cabral was assassinated. After Cabral's death, party leadership fell to Aristides Pereira, who would later become the first president of the Republic of Cape Verde.

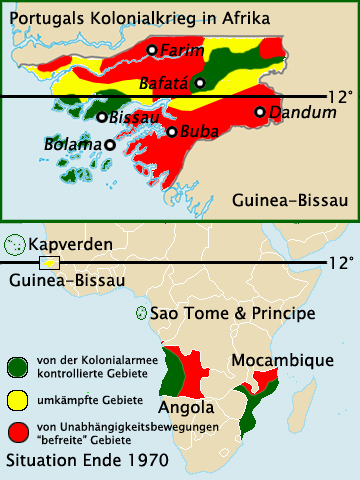
Portuguese-held (green), disputed (yellow) and rebel-held areas (red) in Portuguese-Guinea and other colonies 1970

=== Independence (1973–2000) ===
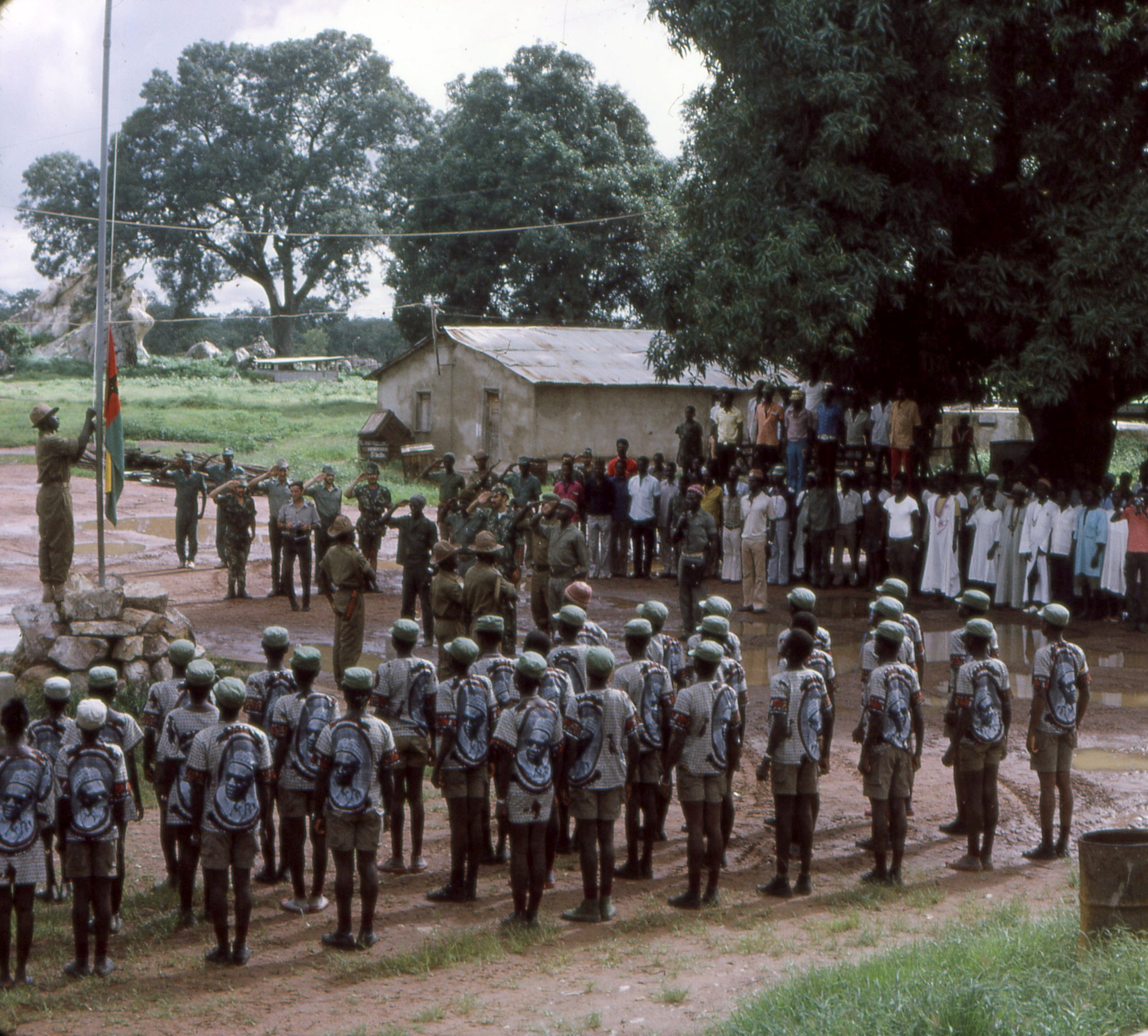
PAIGC forces raise the flag of Guinea-Bissau in 1974.

Independence was unilaterally declared on 24 September 1973, which is now celebrated as the country's Independence Day, a public holiday. The country was formally recognized as independent on 10 September 1974. Nicolae Ceaușescu's Romania was the first country to formally recognise Guinea-Bissau and the first to sign agreements with the African Party for the Independence of Guinea and Cape Verde.

Upon the nation's independence, it declared "Esta É a Nossa Pátria Amada" as its national anthem. Until 1996, this was shared with Cape Verde, which later adopted its own official national anthem "Cântico da Liberdade".

Luís Cabral, brother of Amílcar and co-founder of PAIGC, was appointed the first president of Guinea-Bissau. Independence had begun under the best of auspices. The Bissau-Guinean diaspora had returned to the country en masse. A system of access to school for all had been created. Books were free and schools seemed to have a sufficient number of teachers. The education of girls, previously neglected, was encouraged and a new school calendar, more adapted to the rural world, was adopted.

In 1980, economic conditions deteriorated significantly, leading to general discontent with the government in power. On 14 November 1980, João Bernardo Vieira, known as "Nino Vieira", overthrew President Luís Cabral. The constitution was suspended and a nine-member Military Council of the Revolution, chaired by Vieira, was established. Since then, the country has moved toward a liberal economy. Budget cuts have been made at the expense of the social sector and education.

The country was controlled by the military council until 1984. The first multi-party elections were held in 1994. An army uprising in May 1998 led to the Guinea-Bissau Civil War and the president's ousting in June 1999. Elections were held again in 2000, and Kumba Ialá was elected president.

=== 21st century ===
In September 2003, a military coup occurred. The military arrested Ialá on the charge of being "unable to solve the problems". After being delayed several times, legislative elections were held in March 2004. A mutiny in October 2004 over pay arrears resulted in the death of the head of the armed forces.

In June 2005, presidential elections were held for the first time since the coup that deposed Ialá. Ialá returned as the candidate for the PRS, claiming to be the legitimate president of the country, but the election was won by former president João Bernardo Vieira, deposed in the 1999 coup. Vieira beat Malam Bacai Sanhá in a run-off election. Sanhá initially refused to concede, claiming that tampering and electoral fraud occurred in two constituencies including the capital, Bissau. Foreign monitors described the elections as "calm and organized", despite some reports of arms entering the country prior to the election and few "disturbances during campaigning", including attacks on government offices by unidentified gunmen.

Three years later, Sanhá's PAIGC won a strong parliamentary majority, with 67 of 100 seats, in the parliamentary election held in November 2008. In November 2008, President Vieira's official residence was attacked by members of the armed forces, killing a guard but leaving the president unharmed.

On 2 March 2009, however, Vieira was assassinated by what preliminary reports indicated to be a group of soldiers avenging the death of the head of joint chiefs of staff, General Batista Tagme Na Wai, who had been killed in an explosion the day before. Vieira's death did not trigger widespread violence, but there were signs of turmoil in the country, according to the advocacy group Swisspeace. Military leaders in the country pledged to respect the constitutional order of succession. National Assembly Speaker Raimundo Pereira was appointed as an interim president until a nationwide election on 28 June 2009. It was won by Malam Bacai Sanhá, against Kumba Ialá as the presidential candidate of the PRS.

On 9 January 2012, President Sanhá died, and Pereira was again appointed as an interim president. On the evening of 12 April 2012, members of the country's military staged a coup d'état and arrested Pereira and a leading presidential candidate. Former vice chief of staff, General Mamadu Ture Kuruma, assumed control of the country in the transitional period and started negotiations with opposition parties.

The 2014 general election saw José Mário Vaz elected President of Guinea-Bissau. Vaz became the first elected president to complete his five-year mandate. In the 2019 presidential elections, Vaz was eliminated in the first round, and Umaro Sissoco Embaló was elected president. Embaló, the first president to be elected without the backing of the PAIGC, took office in February 2020.

On 1 February 2022, there was an attempted coup d'état against Embaló. On 2 February 2022, state radio announced that four assailants and two members of the presidential guard had been killed in the incident. The African Union and ECOWAS both condemned the coup. Six days after the attempted coup d'état, on 7 February 2022, there was an attack on the building of Rádio Capital FM, a radio station critical of the Bissau-Guinean government; this was the second time the radio station suffered an attack of this nature in less than two years. A journalist working for the station recalled, while wishing to stay anonymous, that one of their colleagues had recognized one of the cars carrying the attackers as belonging to the presidency.

In 2023, an attempted coup reportedly occurred in the capital, Bissau, leading Embaló to order the dissolution of the opposition-controlled parliament. On 11 September 2024, Embaló announced that he would not seek a second term in the upcoming presidential elections scheduled for November 2025. On 3 March 2025, Embaló said that he would run for a second term in November, contrary to his earlier vows to step down.

On 26 November 2025, soldiers announced on state television that they had seized power, three days after the 2025 general election. The military imposed a curfew, closed national borders, and suspended media outlets; Embaló and opposition leader Domingos Simões Pereira were arrested.

== Politics ==
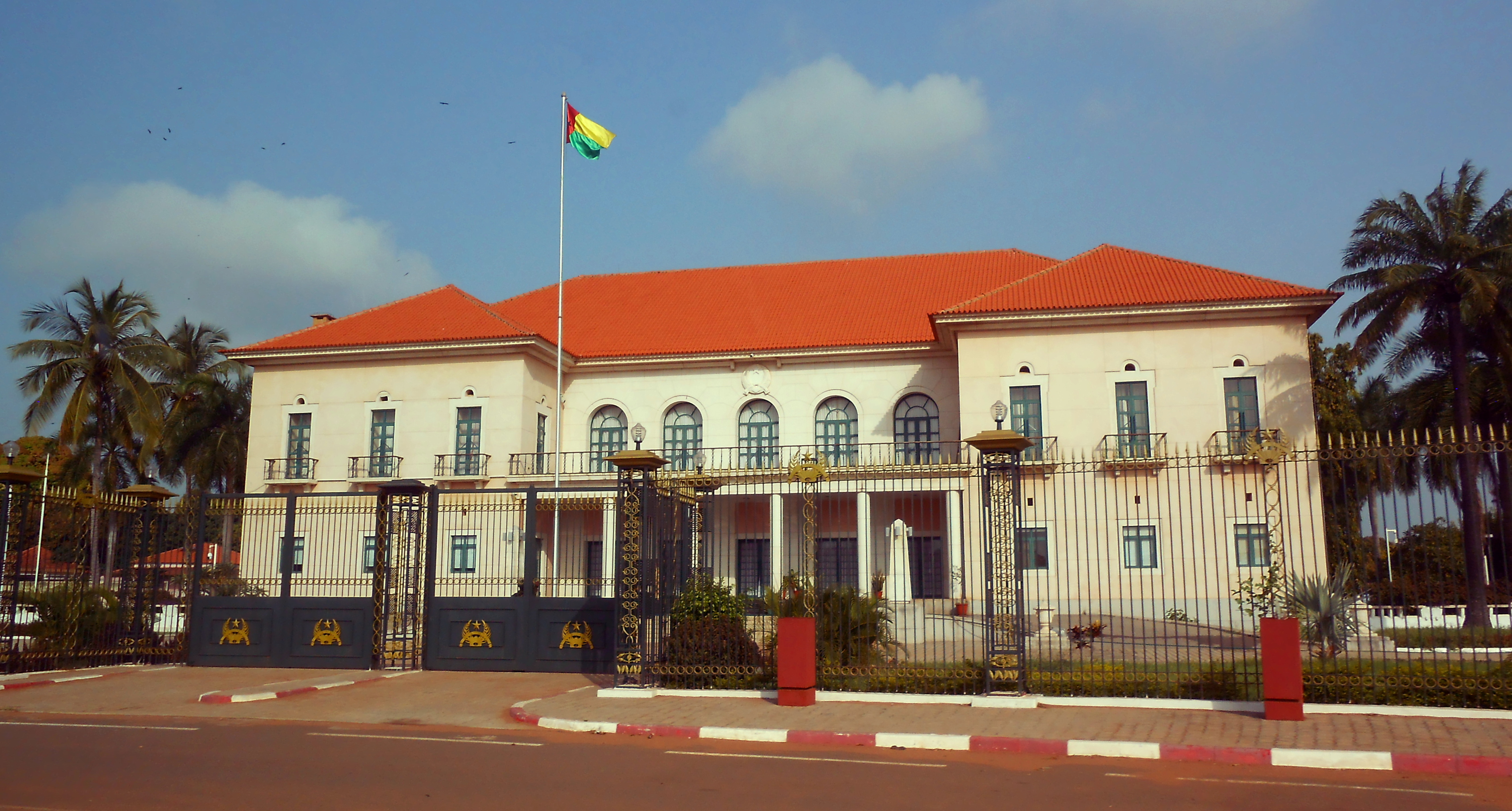
The Presidential Palace of Guinea-Bissau

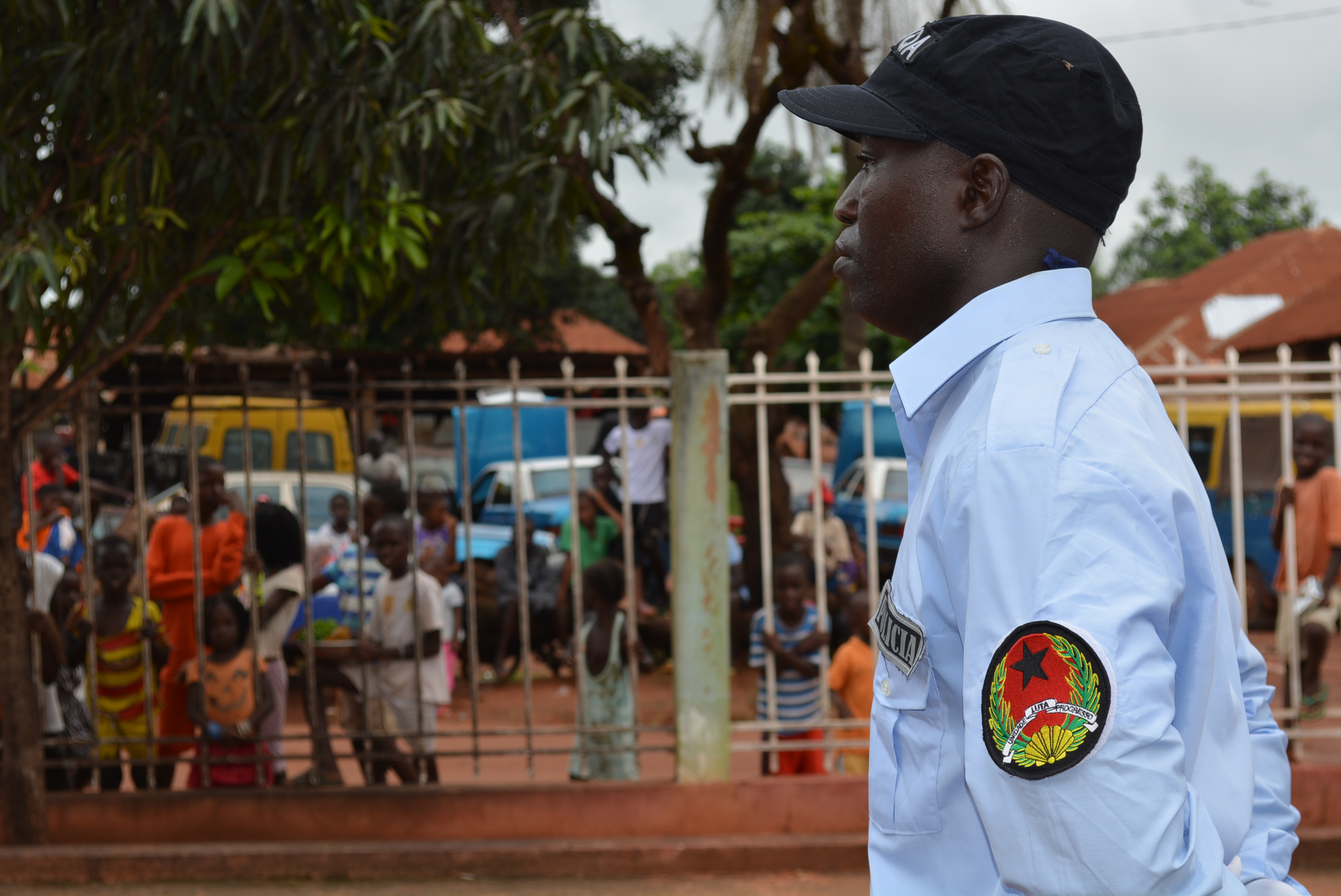
Public Order Police officer during a parade in Guinea-Bissau

Guinea-Bissau is a republic. In the past, the government had been highly centralized. Multi-party governance was not established until mid-1991. The president is the head of state and the prime minister is the head of government under the country's semi-presidential system. From independence in 1974, until Jose Mario Vaz ended his five-year term as president on 24 June 2019, no president successfully served a full five-year term.

At the legislative level, a unicameral Assembleia Nacional Popular (National People's Assembly) is made up of 100 members. They are popularly elected from multi-member constituencies to serve a four-year term. The judicial system is headed by a Tribunal Supremo da Justiça (Supreme Court), made up of nine justices appointed by the president; they serve at the pleasure of the president.

The two main political parties are the PAIGC (African Party for the Independence of Guinea and Cape Verde) and the PRS (Party for Social Renewal). There are more than 20 minor parties. Following a contested first round in the 2025 presidential election, the Army of Guinea-Bissau, led by the Brigadier General Dinis Incanha, organized a coup and took over the Guinean government on November 26th 2025. Since November 27, 2025, General Horta Inta-A Na Man has been serving as the Transitional President and as Chief of the High Command, which is the person leading the High Military Command for the Restoration of National Security and Public Order.

=== Foreign relations ===
Guinea-Bissau is a founding member state of the Community of Portuguese Language Countries (CPLP), also known as the Lusophone Commonwealth, an international organisation and political association of Lusophone nations where Portuguese is an official language.

=== Military ===
A 2019 estimate put the size of the Guinea-Bissau Armed Forces at around 4,400 personnel and military spending is less than 2% of GDP. In 2018, Guinea-Bissau signed the UN treaty on the Prohibition of Nuclear Weapons.

=== Administrative divisions ===
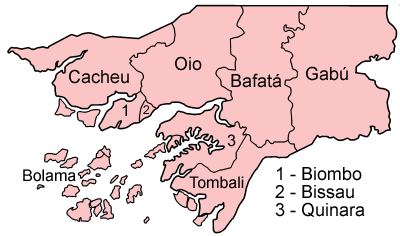
A clickable map of Guinea-Bissau exhibiting its eight regions and one autonomous sector.

Guinea-Bissau is divided into eight regions (regiões) and one autonomous sector (sector autónomo). These, in turn, are subdivided into 37 Sectors. The regions are:

- Bafatá
- Biombo
- Bissau (Note: Autonomous sector.)
- Bolama
- Cacheu
- Gabú
- Oio
- Quinara
- Tombali

== Geography ==
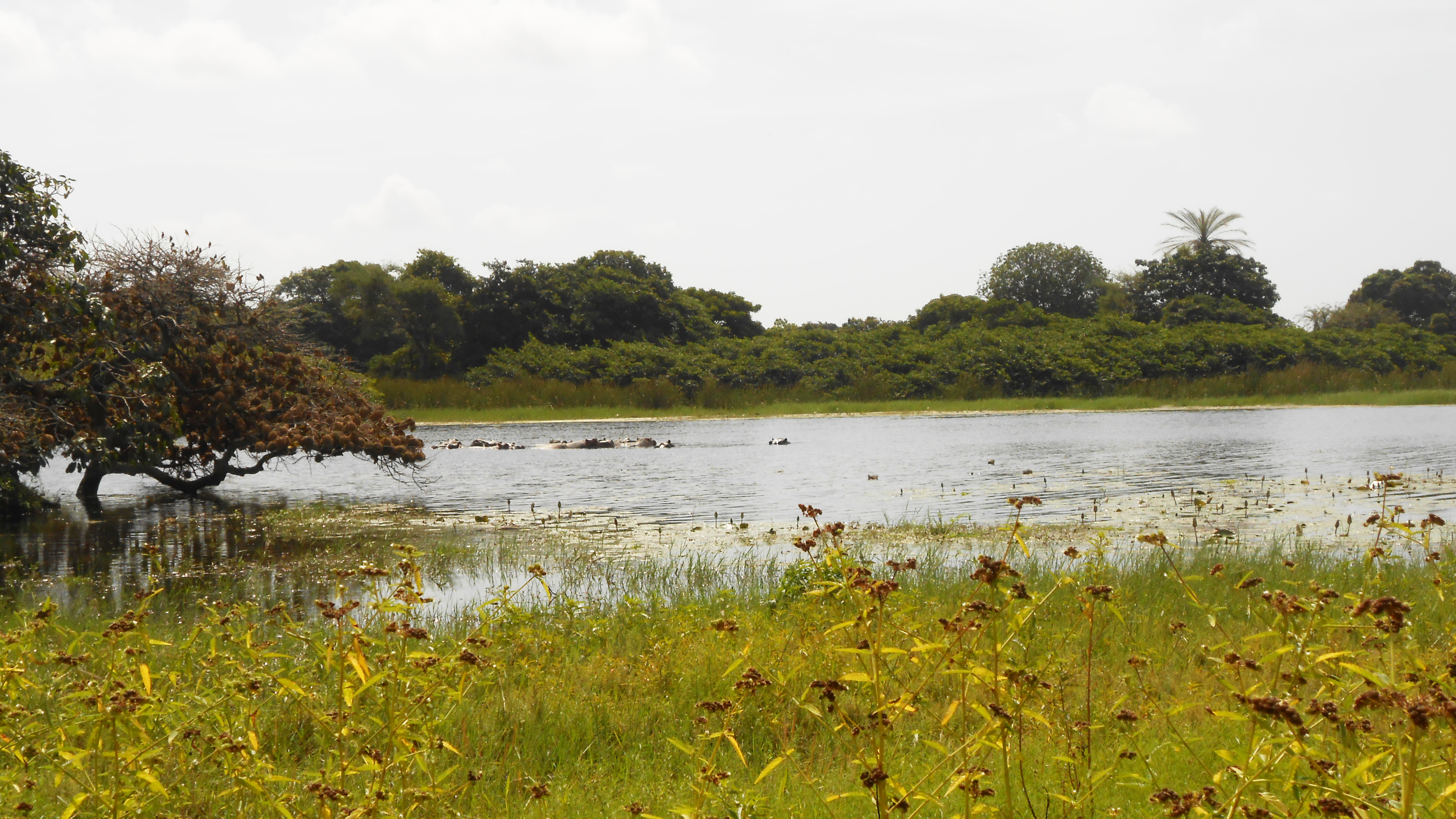
Rare salt water hippopotamuses on Orango Island

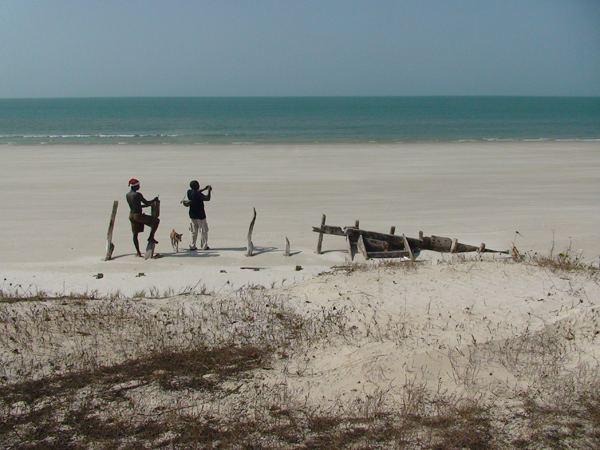
Caravela, Bissagos Islands

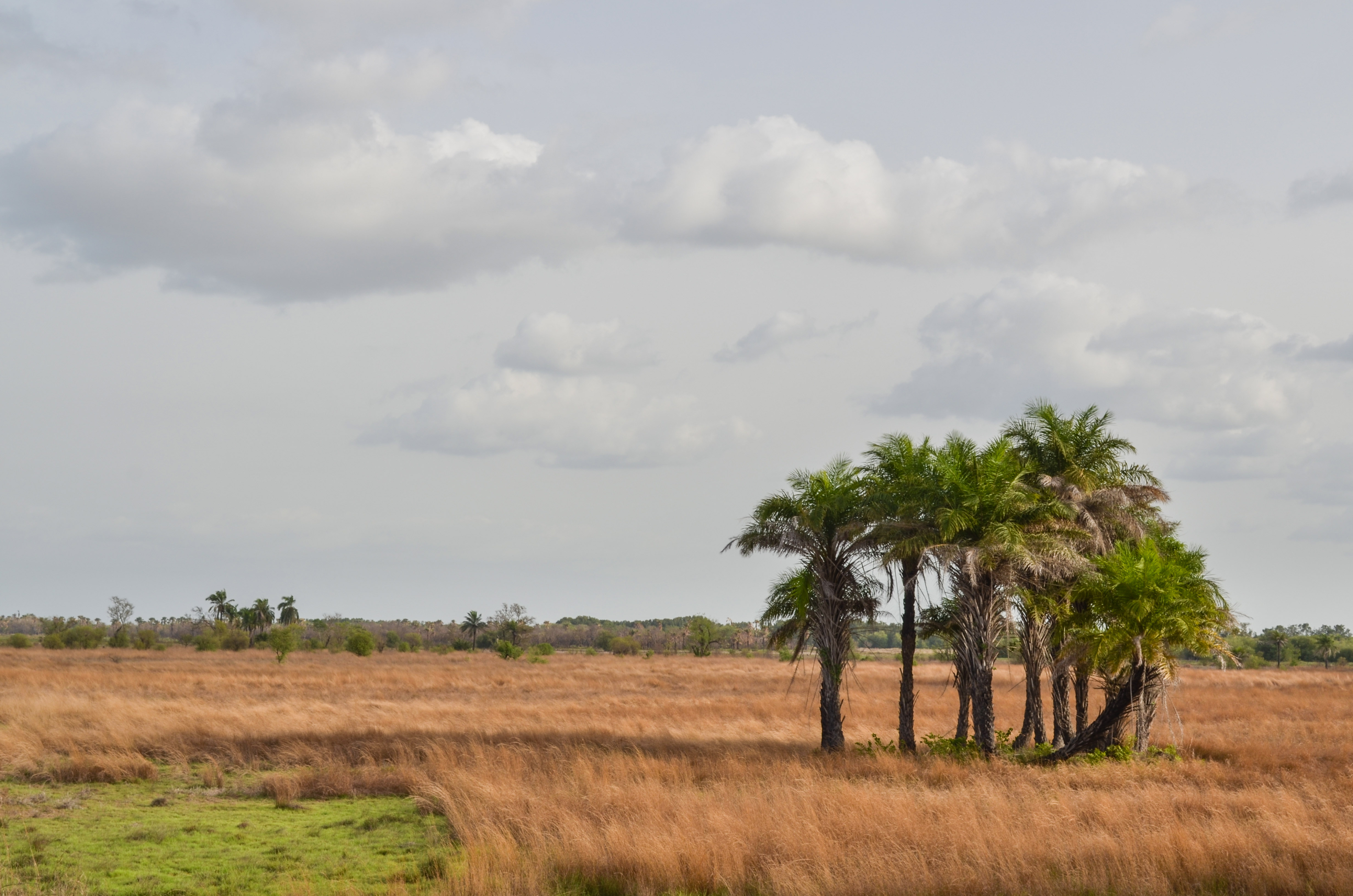
Typical scenery in Guinea-Bissau

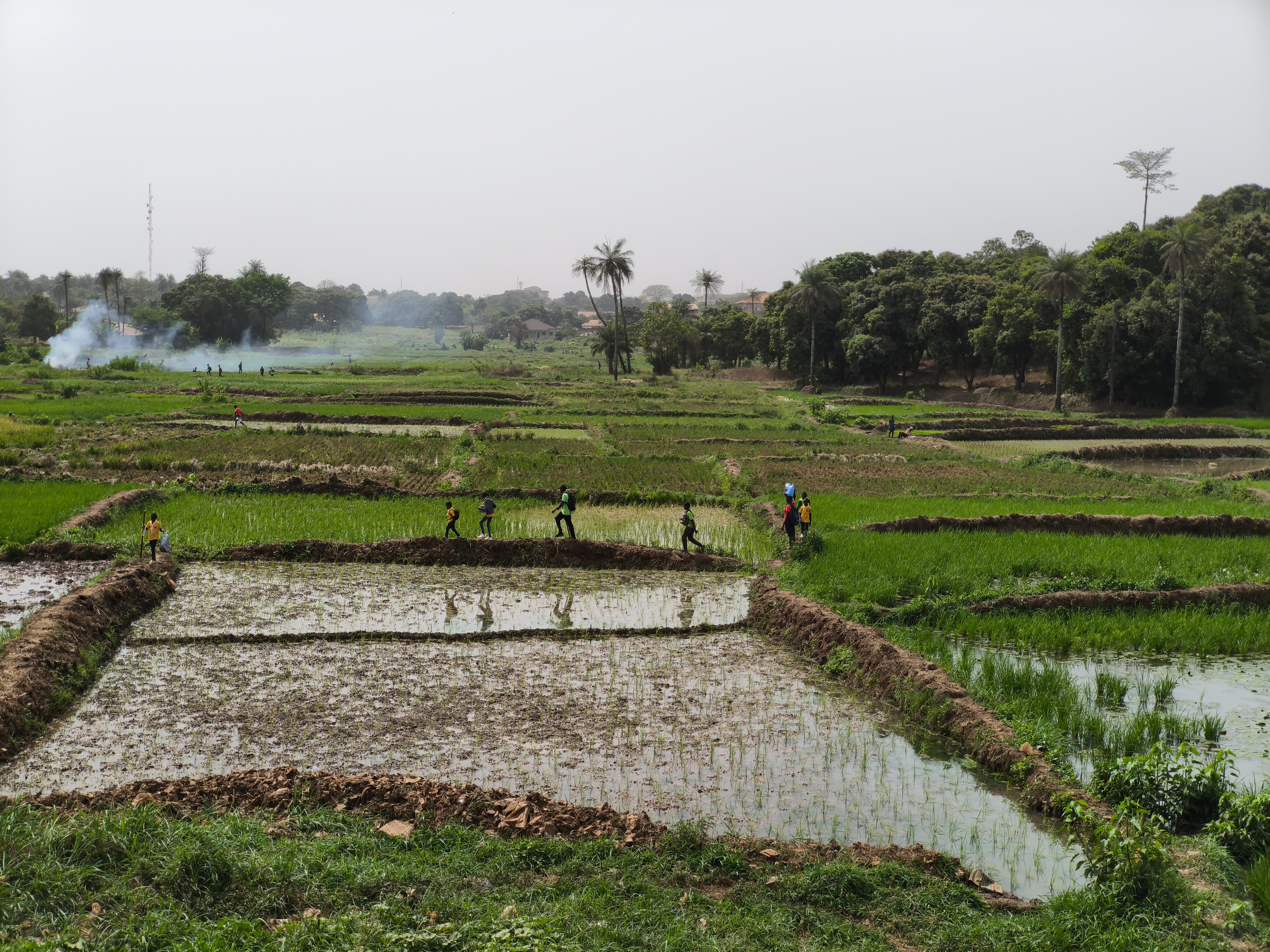
Landscape near Bissau

Guinea-Bissau is bordered by Senegal to the north and Guinea to the south and east, with the Atlantic Ocean to its west. It lies mostly between latitudes 11° and 13°N (a small area is south of 11°), and longitudes 11° and 15°W.

At 36,125 square kilometres (13,948 sq mi), the country is larger in size than Belgium. The highest point is Monte Torin with an elevation of 262 metres (860 ft). Its terrain is mostly low coastal plains with swamps of the Guinean mangroves rising to the Guinean forest–savanna mosaic in the east. Its monsoon-like rainy season alternates with periods of hot, dry harmattan winds blowing from the Sahara. The Bijagós Archipelago, comprising 88 islands and islets, lies off of the mainland. The country is home to two ecoregions: Guinean forest–savanna mosaic and Guinean mangroves.

=== Climate ===
Guinea-Bissau is warm all year with mild temperature fluctuations; it averages 26.3 °C (79.3 °F). The average rainfall for Bissau is 2,024 millimetres (79.7 in), although this is almost entirely accounted for during the rainy season which falls between June and September/October. From December through April, the country experiences drought.

== Economy ==
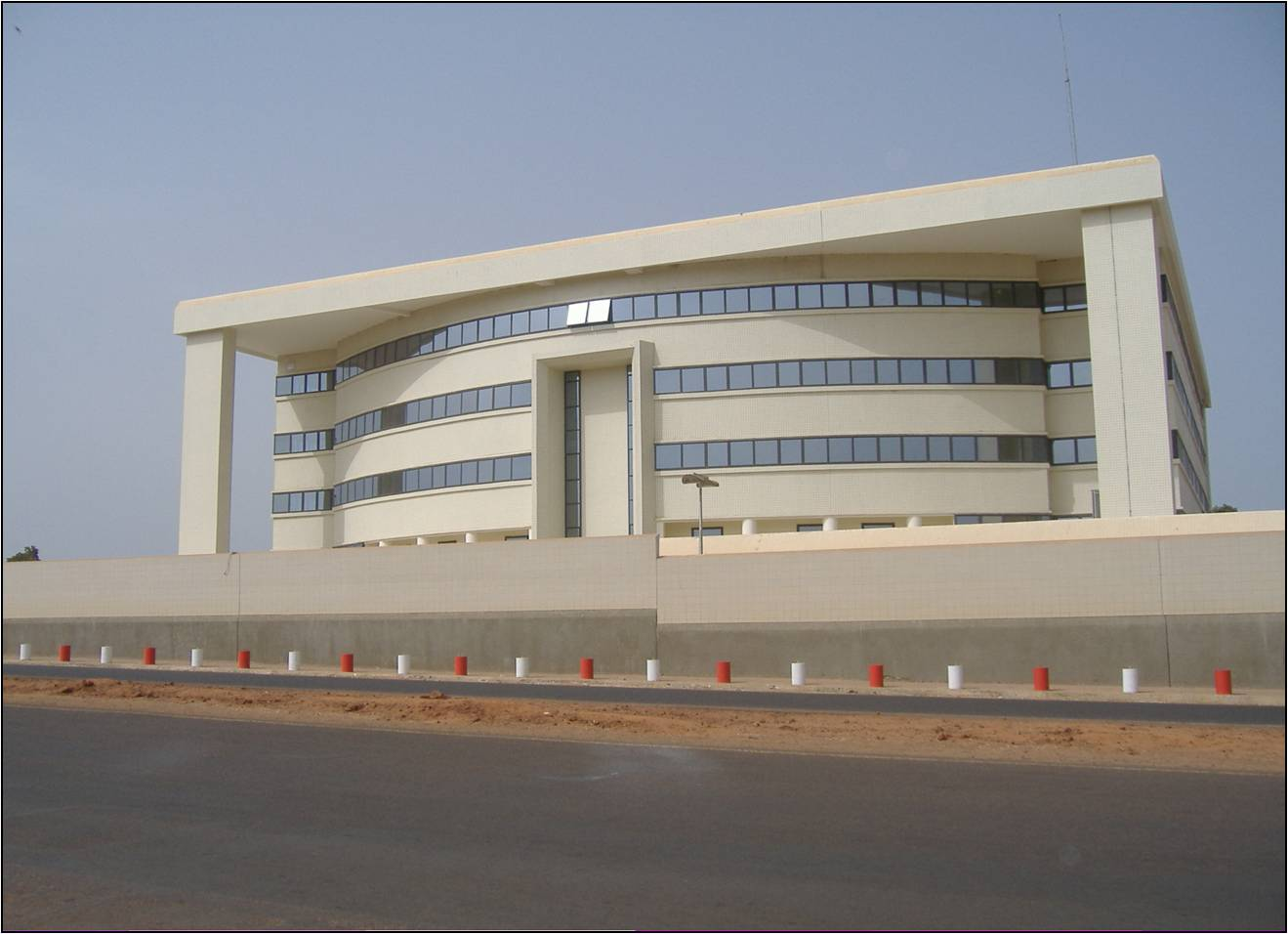
Seat of the Central Bank of Guinea-Bissau

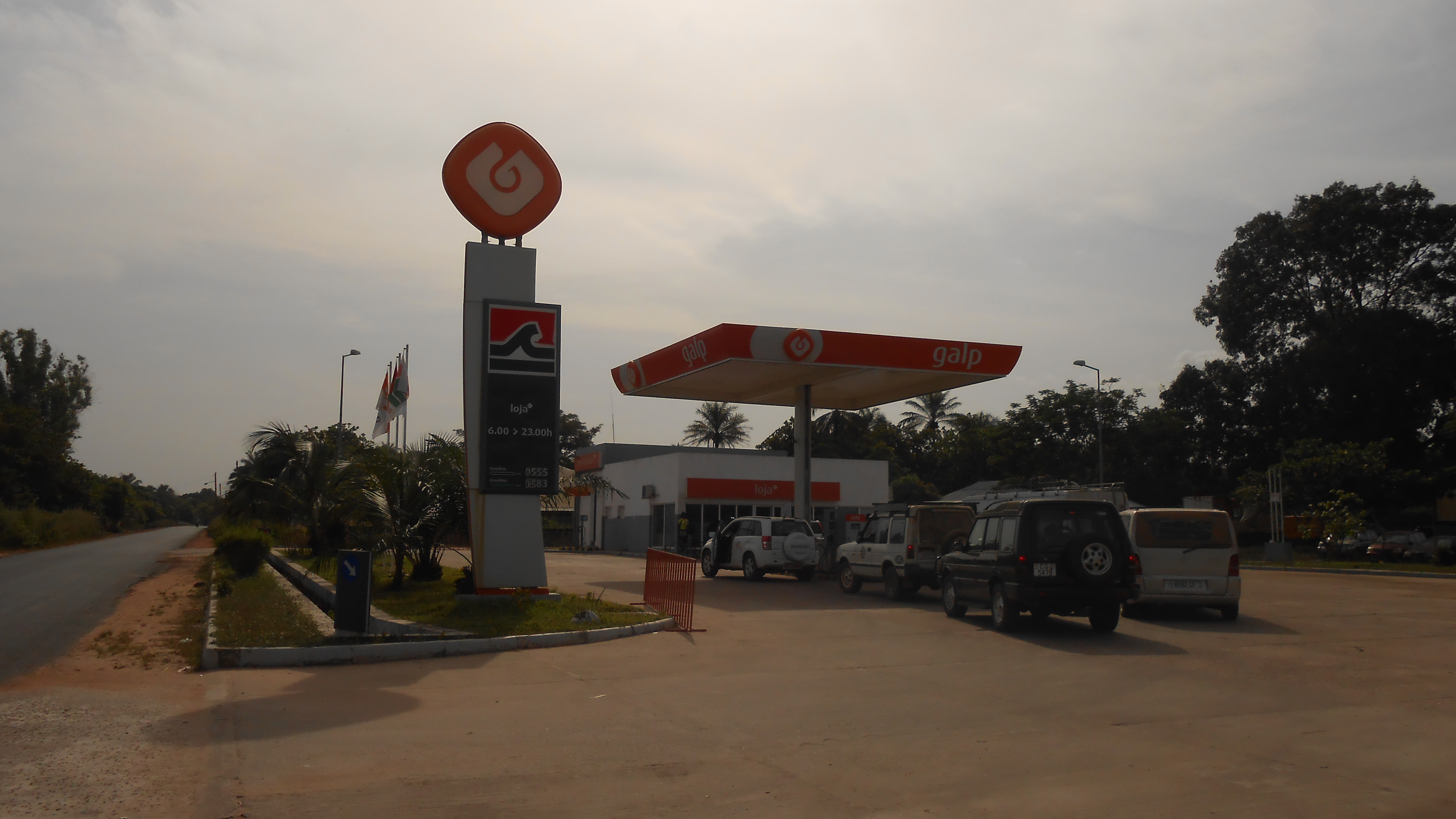
Petrol station in São Domingos

Guinea-Bissau's GDP per capita and Human Development Index are among the lowest in the world. More than two-thirds of the population lives below the poverty line. The economy depends mainly on agriculture; fish, cashew nuts, and ground nuts are its major exports.

A long period of political instability has resulted in depressed economic activity, deteriorating social conditions, and increased macroeconomic imbalances. It takes longer on average to register a new business in Guinea-Bissau (233 days or about 33 weeks) than in any other country in the world except Suriname.

Guinea-Bissau has started to show some economic advances after a pact of stability was signed by the main political parties of the country, leading to an IMF-backed structural reform program.

After several years of economic downturn and political instability, in 1997, Guinea-Bissau entered the CFA franc monetary system, bringing about some internal monetary stability. The civil war from 1998 to 1999, and a military coup in September 2003, again disrupted economic activity, leaving a substantial part of the economic and social infrastructure in ruins and intensifying the already widespread poverty. Following the parliamentary elections in March 2004 and presidential elections in July 2005, the country is trying to recover from the long period of instability, despite a still-fragile political situation.

Beginning around 2005, drug traffickers based in Latin America began to use Guinea-Bissau, along with several neighbouring West African nations, as a transshipment point to Europe for cocaine. The nation was described by a United Nations official as being at risk for becoming a "narco-state". The government and the military have done little to stop drug trafficking, which increased after the 2012 coup d'état. The government of Guinea-Bissau continues to be ravaged by illegal drug distribution, according to The Economist. Guinea-Bissau is a member of the Organization for the Harmonisation of Business Law in Africa (OHADA).

== Demographics ==
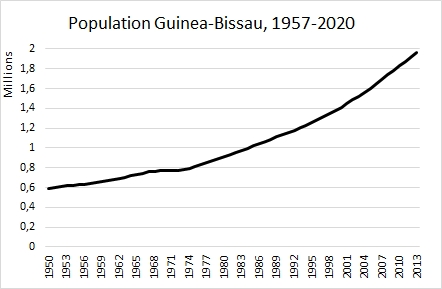
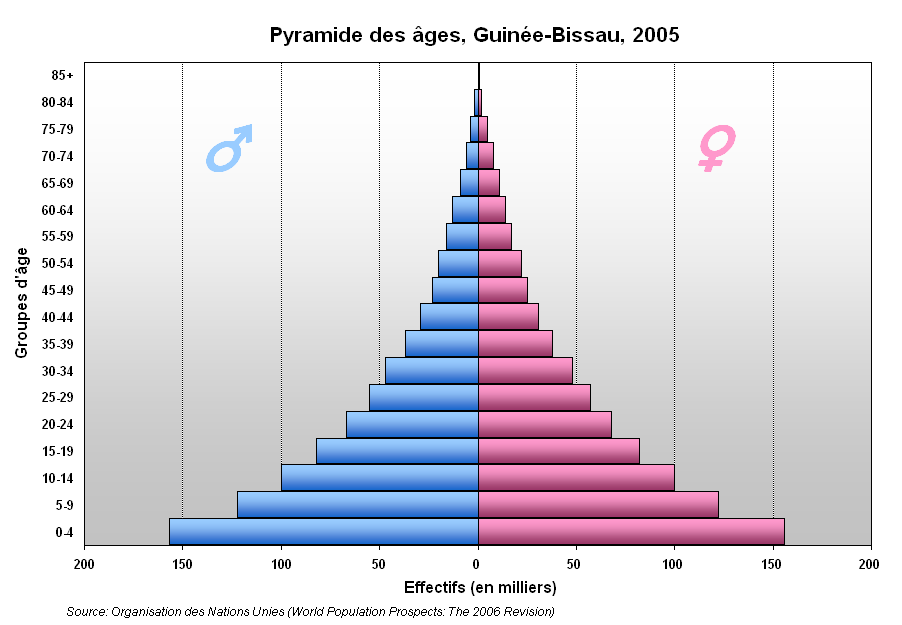
(Left) Guinea-Bissau's population between 1950 and 2020. (Right) Guinea-Bissau's population pyramid, 2005. In 2010, 41.3% of Guinea-Bissau's population were aged under 15.

According to the 2022 revision of the World Population Prospects, Guinea-Bissau's population was 2,060,721 in 2021, compared to 518,000 in 1950. The proportion of the population below the age of 15 in 2010 was 41.3%, 55.4% were aged between 15 and 65 years of age, while 3.3% were aged 65 years or older.

=== Ethnic groups ===
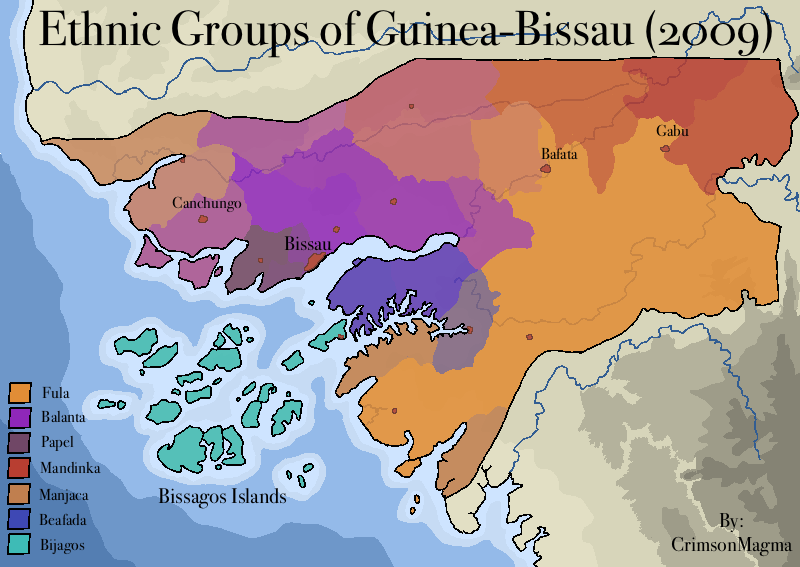
The major ethnic groups of Guinea-Bissau as of 2009. All red spots excluding in the northeast are cities.

Ethnic groups in Guinea-Bissau
Ethnic groups	percent
Fula	28.5%
Balanta	22.5%
Mandinka	14.7%
Papel	9.1%
Manjaca	8.3%
Beafada	3.5%
Mancanha	3.1%
Bijagós	2.1%
Felupe	1.7%
Mansoanca	1.4%
Balanta Mane	1%
Nalu	0.9%
Saracule	0.5%
Sosso	0.4%
Not Stated	2.2%

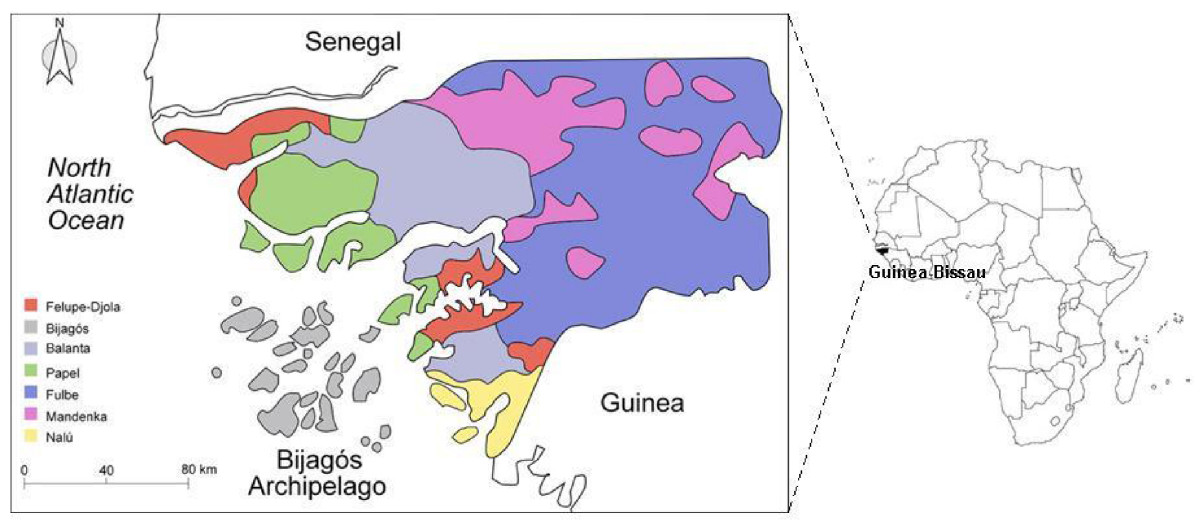
Guinea-Bissau present-day settlement pattern of the ethnic groups

The population of Guinea-Bissau is ethnically diverse and has many distinct languages, customs, and social structures.

Bissau-Guineans can be divided into the following ethnic groups:

- Fula and the Mandinka-speaking people, who constitute the largest portion of the population and are concentrated in the north and northeast;
- Balanta and Papel people, who live in the southern coastal regions; and
- Manjaco and Mancanha, who occupy the central and northern coastal areas.

Most of the remainder are mestiços of mixed Portuguese and African descent.

Portuguese natives are a very small percentage of Bissau-Guineans. After Guinea-Bissau gained independence, most of the Portuguese nationals left the country. The country has a tiny Chinese population. These include traders and merchants of mixed Portuguese and Cantonese ancestry from the former Portuguese colony of Macau. There are also small Cape Verdean, Lebanese and Jewish communities in the country. Portuguese people made up the largest white population during colonial period but there was also some Lebanese people, Italians, French people and English people.

=== Major cities ===
Main cities in Guinea-Bissau include:

Rank	City	Population	
Rank	City	2015 estimate	Region
1	Bissau	492,004	Bissau
2	Gabú	48,670	Gabú
3	Bafatá	37,985	Bafatá
4	Bissorã	29,468	Oio
5	Bolama	16,216	Bolama
6	Cacheu	14,320	Cacheu
7	Bubaque	12,922	Bolama
8	Catió	11,498	Tombali
9	Mansôa	9,198	Oio
10	Buba	8,993	Quinara

=== Languages ===
Languages in Guinea-Bissau
Languages	percent
Portuguese Creole	90.4%
Portuguese	32.1%
Fula	16.0%
Balanta	14.0%
French	7.1%
Mandinka	7.0%
Manjak	5.0%
Papel	3.0%
English	2.9%
Felupe	1.0%
Spanish	0.5%
Russian	0.1%
Other	1.8%

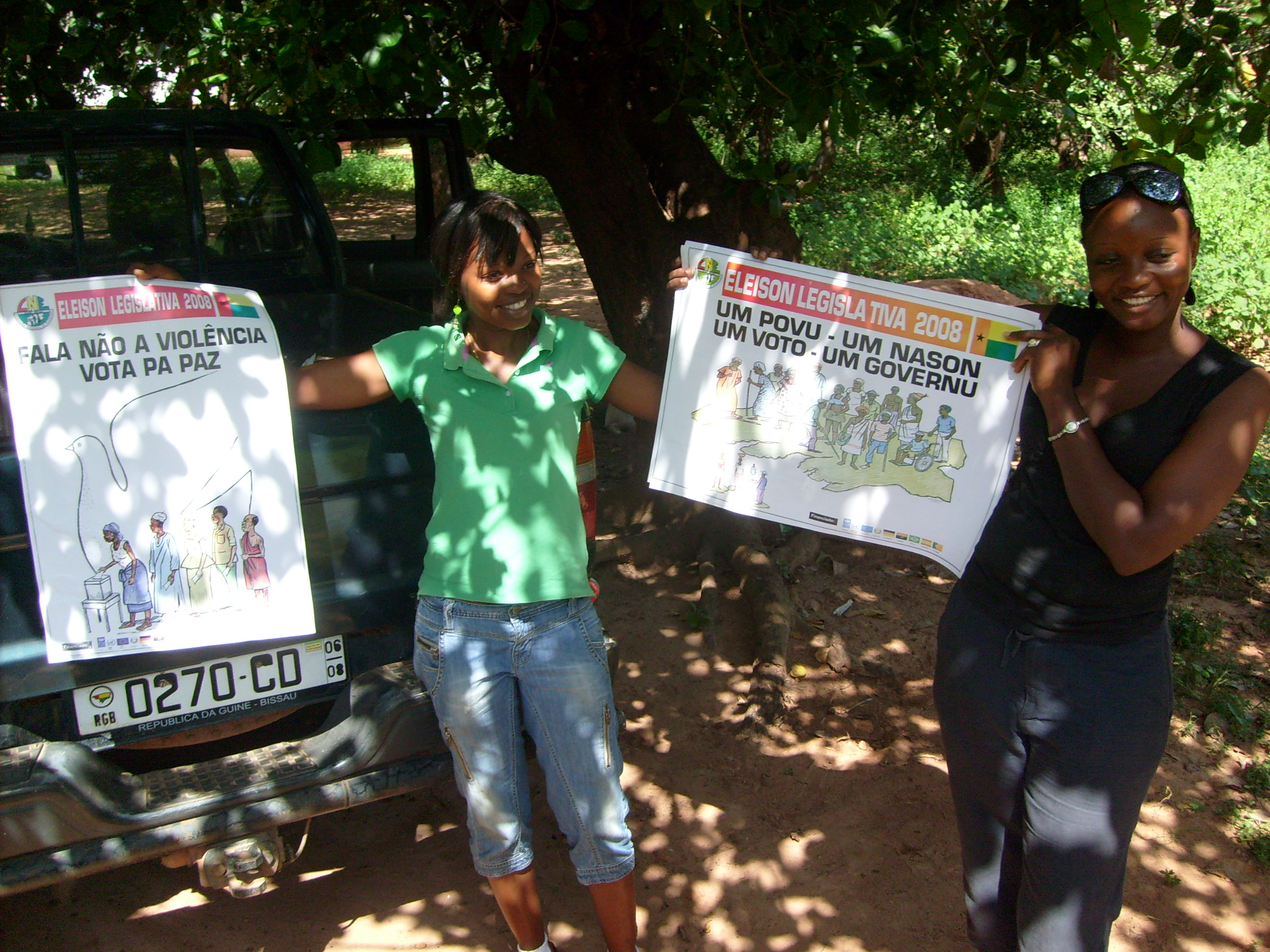
Voter education posters in Crioulo for Guinea-Bissau legislative election, 2008, Biombo region

Though a small country, Guinea-Bissau has several ethnic groups which are very distinct from each other, with their own cultures and languages. Colonisation and racial intermixing brought Portuguese and the Portuguese creole known as Kriol or crioulo.

The sole official language of Guinea-Bissau since independence, Standard Portuguese is spoken mostly as a second language, with few native speakers and its use is often confined to the intellectual and political elites. It is the language of government and national communication as a legacy of colonial rule. Schooling from the primary to tertiary levels is conducted in Portuguese, although only 67% of children have access to any formal education. Data suggests that the number of Portuguese speakers ranges from 11 to 15%. In the latest census (2009) 27.1% of the population claimed to speak non-creole Portuguese (46.3% of city dwellers and 14.7% of the rural population, respectively). Portuguese creole is spoken by 44% of the population and is effectively the lingua franca among distinct groups for most of the population. Creole's usage is still expanding, and it is understood by the vast majority of the population. However, decreolisation processes are occurring, due to undergoing interference from Standard Portuguese and the creole forms a continuum of varieties with the standard language, the most distant are basilects and the closer ones, acrolects. A post-creole continuum exists in Guinea-Bissau and crioulo 'leve' ('soft' creole) variety being closer to the Portuguese-language norm. A 2025 Afrobarometer survey in Guinea Bissau found 40% of the 1,200 respondents mainly spoke Creole at home, which makes it the most widely spoken home language in the country.

The remaining rural population speaks a variety of native African languages unique to each ethnicity: Fula (16%), Balanta (14%), Mandinka (7%), Manjak (5%), Papel (3%), Felupe (1%), Beafada (0.7%), Bijagó (0.3%), and Nalu (0.1%). Most Portuguese and Mestiços also have one of the African languages and Kriol as additional languages. Ethnic African languages are not discouraged, in any situation, despite their lower prestige. These languages are the link between individuals of the same ethnic background and daily used in villages, between neighbours or friends, traditional and religious ceremonies, and also used in contact between the urban and rural populations. However, none of these languages are dominant in Guinea-Bissau.

French is taught as a foreign language in schools, because Guinea-Bissau is surrounded by French-speaking nations. Guinea-Bissau is a full member of the Francophonie.

=== Religion ===
Religion in Guinea-Bissau (CIA, 2020 est.)
Religion	Percent
Islam	46.1%
Folk religions	30.6%
Christianity	18.9%
Other/unaffiliated	4.4%

Various studies suggest that slightly less than half of the population of Guinea-Bissau is Muslim, while substantial minorities follow folk religions or Christianity. The CIA World Factbook's 2020 estimate stated that the population was 46.1% Muslim, 30.6% following folk religions, 18.9% Christian, 4.4% other or unaffiliated. In 2010, a Pew Research survey determined that the population was 45.1% Muslim and 19.7% Christian, with 30.9% practicing folk religion and 4.3 other faiths. A 2015 Pew-Templeton study found that the population was 45.1% Muslim, 30.9% practicing folk religions, 19.7% Christian, and 4.3% unaffiliated. The ARDA projected in 2020 the share of the Muslim population to be 44.7%. It also estimated 41.2% of the population to be practitioners of ethnic religions and 13% to be Christians.

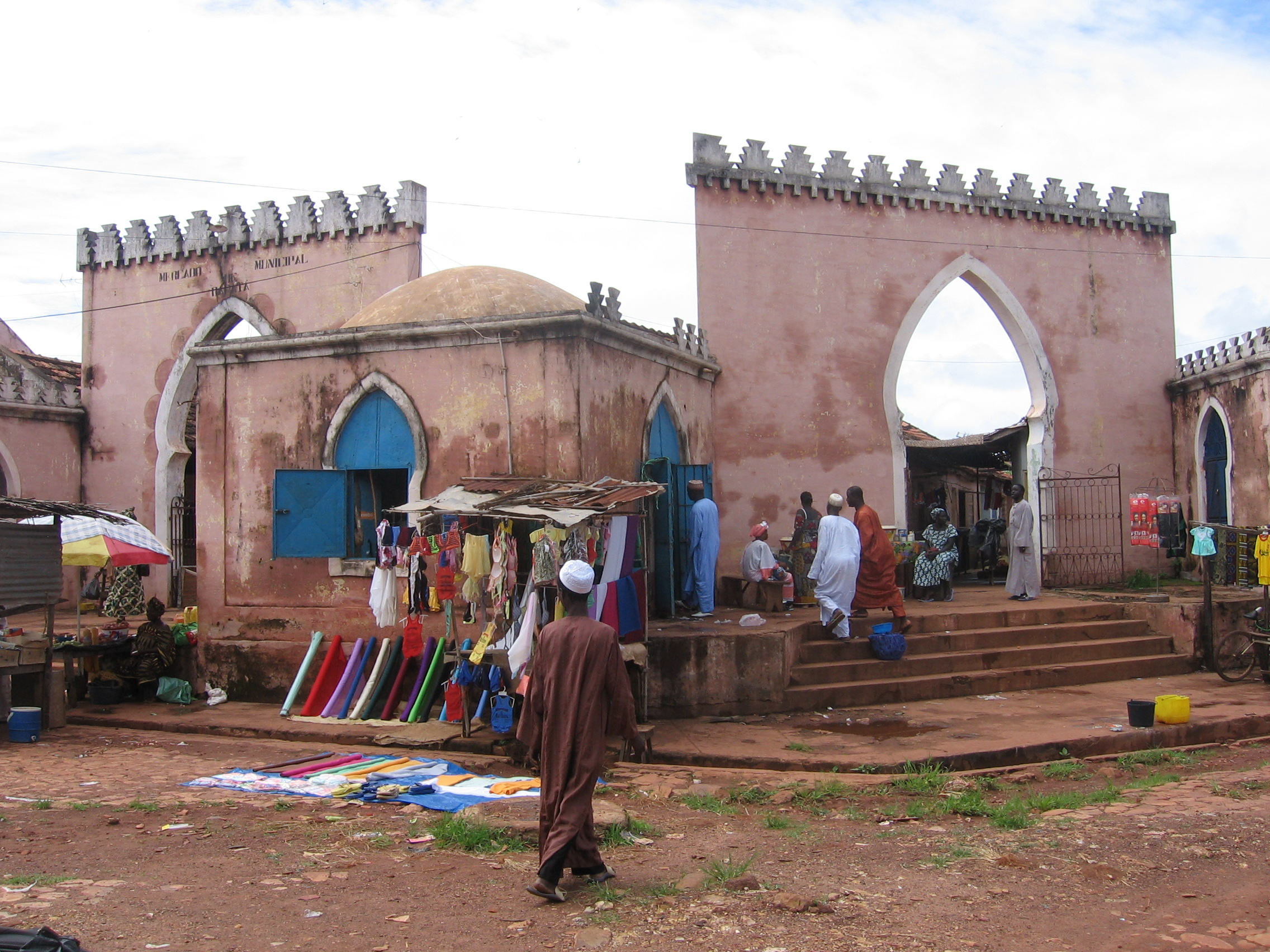
Men in Islamic garb, Bafatá, Guinea-Bissau

Concerning religious identity among Muslims, a Pew report determined that in Guinea-Bissau there is no prevailing sectarian identity. Guinea-Bissau shared this distinction with other Sub-Saharan countries like Tanzania, Uganda, Liberia, Nigeria and Cameroon.This Pew research also stated that countries in this specific study that declared to not have any clear dominant sectarian identity were mostly concentrated in Sub-Saharan Africa. Another Pew report, The Future of World Religions, predicts that from 2010 to 2050, practitioners of Islam will increase their share of the population in Guinea-Bissau.

Many residents practice syncretic forms of Islamic and Christian faiths, combining their practices with traditional African beliefs. Muslims dominate the north and east, while Christians dominate the south and coastal regions. The Roman Catholic Church claims most of the Christian community.

The 2021 US Department of State Report on International Religious Freedom mentions the fact that leaders of different religious communities believe that the existing communities are essentially tolerant, but express some concerns about rising religious fundamentalism in the country. An incident in July 2022, when a Catholic church in the overwhelmingly Muslim region of Gabú was vandalised, raised concern amongst the Christian community that Islamic extremism might be infiltrating the country. However, there have been no further similar incidents, and no direct links to Islamic extremists have surfaced.

=== Education ===
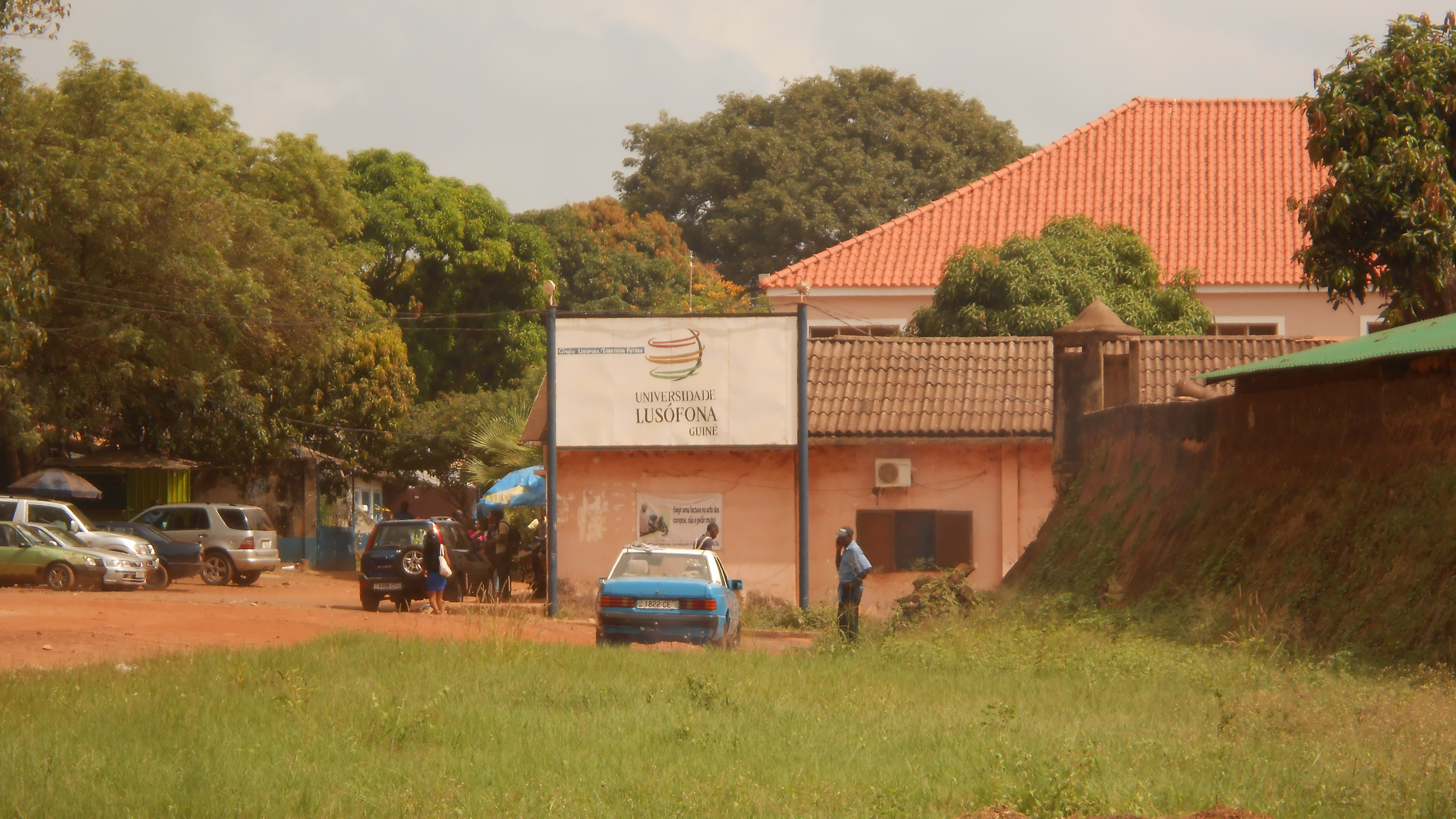

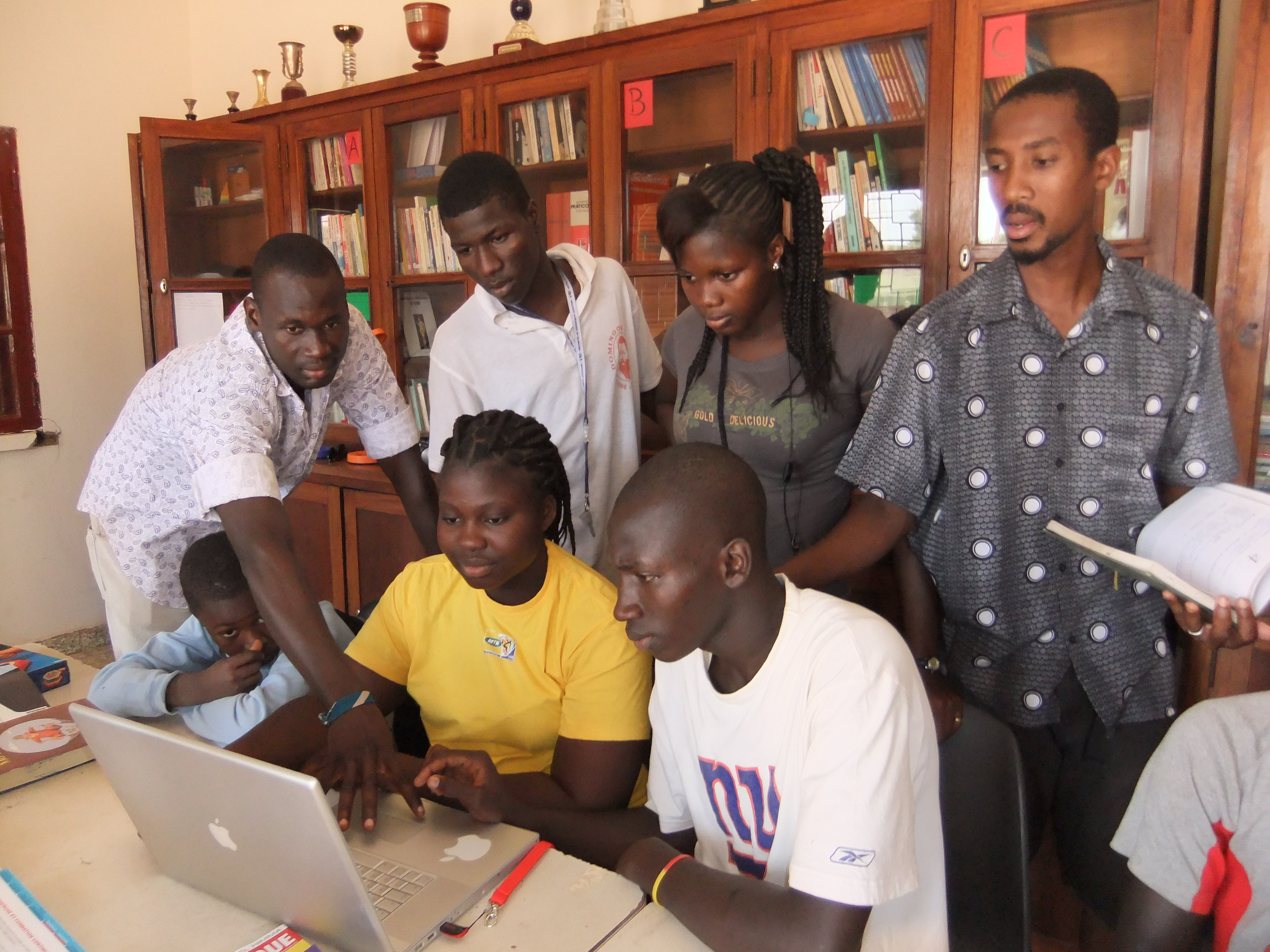
Universidade Lusófona of Bissau (up). Students at Biblioteca Jovem, Bairro da Ajuda, in Guinea-Bissau. (down)

Education is compulsory from the age of 7 to 13. Pre-school education for children between three and six years of age is optional and in its early stages. There are five levels of education: pre-school, elemental and complementary basic education, general and complementary secondary education, general secondary education, technical and professional teaching, and higher education (university and non-universities). Basic education is under reform, and now forms a single cycle, comprising six years of education. Secondary education is widely available and there are two cycles (7th to 9th classe and 10th to 11th classe). Professional education in public institutions is nonoperational, however private school offerings opened, including the Centro de Formação São João Bosco (since 2004) and the Centro de Formação Luís Inácio Lula da Silva (since 2011).

Higher education is limited and most prefer to be educated abroad, with students preferring to enroll in Portugal. A number of universities, to which an institutionally autonomous Faculty of Law as well as a Faculty of Medicine that is maintained by Cuba and functions in different cities.

Child labor is very common. The enrollment of boys is higher than that of girls. In 1998, the gross primary enrollment rate was 53.5%, with higher enrollment ratio for males (67.7%) compared to females (40%).

Non-formal education is centered on community schools and the teaching of adults. In 2011, the literacy rate was estimated at 55.3% (68.9% male, and 42.1% female).

== Culture ==
=== Music ===
The music of Guinea-Bissau is usually associated with the polyrhythmic gumbe genre, the country's primary musical export. However, civil unrest and other factors have combined over the years to keep gumbe, and other genres, out of mainstream audiences, even in generally syncretist African countries.

The calabash is the primary musical instrument of Guinea-Bissau, and is used in extremely swift and rhythmically complex dance music. Lyrics are almost always in Guinea-Bissau Creole, a Portuguese-based creole language, and are often humorous and topical, revolving around current events and controversies.

The word gumbe is sometimes used generically, to refer to any music of the country, although it most specifically refers to a unique style that fuses about ten of the country's folk music traditions. Tina and tinga are other popular genres, while extent folk traditions include ceremonial music used in funerals, initiations, and other rituals, as well as Balanta brosca and kussundé, Mandinga djambadon, and the kundere sound of the Bissagos Islands.

=== Cuisine ===
Common dishes include soups and stews. Common ingredients include yams, sweet potato, cassava, onion, tomato, and plantain. Spices, peppers, and chilis are used in cooking, including Aframomum melegueta seeds (Guinea pepper).

=== Film ===
Flora Gomes is an internationally renowned film director; his most famous film is Nha Fala (English: My Voice). Gomes's Mortu Nega (Death Denied) (1988) was the first fiction film and the second feature film ever made in Guinea-Bissau. (The first feature film was N'tturudu, by director Umban u'Kest in 1987.) At FESPACO 1989, Mortu Nega won the prestigious Oumarou Ganda Prize. In 1992, Gomes directed Udju Azul di Yonta, which was screened in the Un Certain Regard section at the 1992 Cannes Film Festival. Gomes has also served on the boards of many Africa-centric film festivals. The actress Babetida Sadjo was born in Bafatá, Guinea-Bissau.

=== Sport ===
Football is the most popular sport in Guinea-Bissau. The Guinea-Bissau national football team is under the authority of the Federação de Futebol da Guiné-Bissau. They are a member of the Confederation of African Football (CAF) and FIFA.

== See also ==
- Outline of Guinea-Bissau
