= Christianity in Guinea-Bissau =

Christianity and its followers in (Guinea-Bissau)

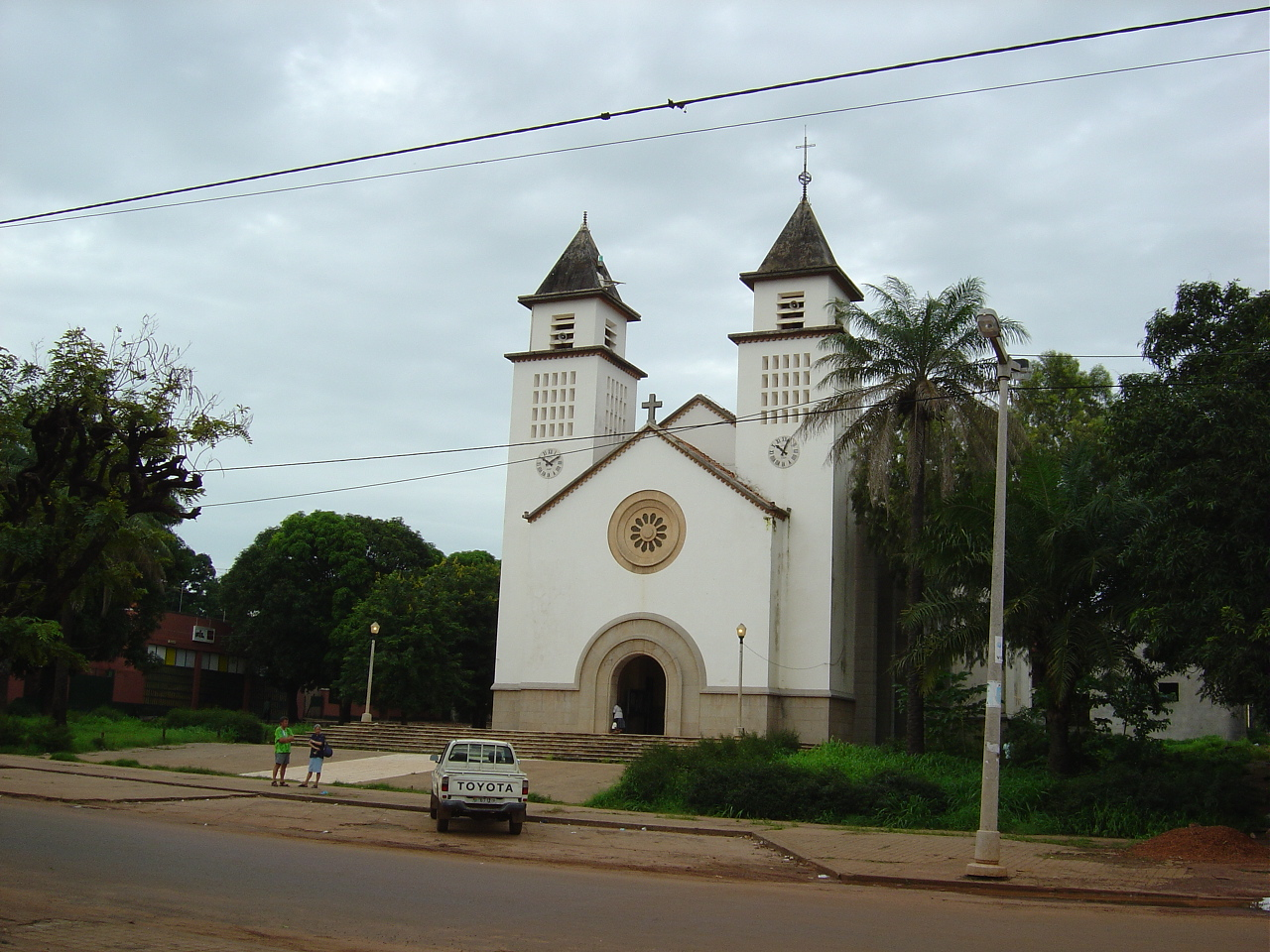
Cathedral in Bissau

Christianity is the third largest religion in Guinea-Bissau, constituting approximately 19% of the country's population according to a comprehensive 2020 study and report by the PEW. Various missionary groups operate freely throughout the nation.

Christians are present throughout the country but most heavily concentrated in Bissau and western regions. The Constitution sees freedom of conscience and religion as inviolable and provides for freedom of worship.

In 2023, the country scored 3 out of 4 for religious freedom.

== Roman Catholicism ==
In 2022, over 70% of Christians belong to the Roman Catholic Church (including the Portuguese Bissau-Guineans).

There are two dioceses:

- Bafatá
- Bissau

== See also ==
- Religion in Guinea-Bissau
- Islam in Guinea-Bissau
