= List of ecoregions in Guinea-Bissau =

The following is a list of ecoregions in Guinea Bissau, according to the Worldwide Fund for Nature (WWF).

== Terrestrial ecoregions ==
Guinea-Bissau is in the Afrotropical realm. Ecoregions are listed by biome.

=== Tropical and subtropical grasslands, savannas, and shrublands ===
- Guinean forest-savanna mosaic

=== Mangrove ===
- Guinean mangroves

== Freshwater ecoregions ==
By bioregion:

=== Nilo-Sudan ===
- Senegal-Gambia

=== Upper Guinea ===
- Northern Upper Guinea

== Marine ecoregions ==
- Gulf of Guinea
