= Associação DNS.PT =

Associação DNS.PT is a non-profit organisation responsible for administration, operation and maintenance of domain registrations in the .pt top-level domain. It was created on 1 June 2013.

Its founding members are the Foundation for Science and Technology, IP (FCT), the Association for Electronic Commerce and Interactive Advertising (ACEPI), and the Portuguese Association for Consumer Protection (DECO).

DNS.PT is the designated IANA representative as responsible entity for the delegation of the .pt ccTLD.
