= Public holidays in Guinea-Bissau =

This is a list of the ten holidays in Guinea-Bissau. Employers must compensate workers on these days. Other holidays can be declared at any time.

== Public holidays ==
Date	English name	Description
January 1	New Year's Day	
January 20	National Heroes' Day	
March 8	International Women's Day	Government
March or April	Good Friday	Government
March or April	Easter Sunday	Resurrection of Jesus
May 1	International Workers' Day	Labour Day
September 24	Independence Day	Independence from Portugal, 1974
November 2	All Souls' Day	Government
December 24	Christmas Eve	Government
December 25	Christmas Day	Birth of Jesus
December 31	New Year's Eve	Government
1 Shawwal	Korité	Festival of Breaking the Fast
10 Dhu al-Hijjah	Tabaski	Feast of the Sacrifice
