= Emblem of Guinea-Bissau =

Versions
- Armiger: Republic of Guinea-Bissau
- Adopted: 1973
- Shield: Gules, in chief a Mullet or five points Sable
- Supporters: Two wreathes of laurel proper
- Compartment: A seashell Or
- Motto: Unidade, Luta, Progresso (Portuguese: "Unity, Struggle, Progress")

The Emblem of Guinea-Bissau was adopted shortly after independence from Portugal in 1973.

== Design ==
Featured prominently is a black star, that is part of traditional Pan-African symbolism, and is often referred to as the Black star of Africa. A seashell at the bottom unites two symmetrical olive branches. The seashell is symbolism for the location of the country on the West coast of Africa.

The red banner contains the national motto of Guinea-Bissau: that translates to English as "Unity, Struggle, Progress".

== Historical coat of arms ==
In 1935, the Portuguese colonies were officially assigned coats of arms that followed a standard design pattern. (Note: published in the Diário do Govêrno)

A proposal for a coat of arms for the Portuguese Guinea, at the request of the General Agency of the Colonies, for the Portuguese Institute of Heraldry and prepared by Afonso Dornelas in June 1932.

Coat of arms of Portuguese Guinea between May 8, 1935 - June 11, 1951.

Coat of arms of Portuguese Guinea from June 11, 1951 to September 24, 1973.

Lesser coat of arms between May 8, 1935 - September 24, 1973.

Emblem of Guinea-Bissau (since 1973)

Variant of emblem
