= Religion in Guinea-Bissau =

Religion in Guinea-Bissau (Pew Research Centre, 2020)
1. Islam (56.0%)
2. Christianity (22.0%)
3. Other faiths (11.0%)
4. Unaffiliated (12.0%)

Religion in Guinea-Bissau (Afrobarometer 2025)
Religion	Percent
Islam	49.6%
Christianity	37.8%
Traditional	6.4%
None	5.4%
Other	0.8%

Religion in Guinea-Bissau is diverse, with country ranking as the seventh most religiously diverse in the world. Recent sources indicate Islam is the largest religion practised by approximately half the population, while followers of Christianity and traditional African religions also constitute major religious groups in the country. The relative share of Christians and Traditionalists in Guinea-Bissau is heavily disputed, and there exists little certainty on the precise religious demographics of the country. Syncretism is especially common in Guinea-Bissau among both Christians and Muslims, with some ethnic groups that have converted to Islam retaining animistic practices related to local spirits and ancestors.

Christians mostly live along the coastal regions and belong to the Roman Catholic Church (including Portuguese Bissau-Guineans) and various Protestant denominations. In 2017, Sunni Islam, including that of Sufi-oriented, were most concentrated in the northern and northeastern parts of the country, while practitioners of traditional indigenous religious beliefs generally live in all but the northern parts of the country.

Guinea-Bissau is legally defined as a secular state, though in practice politicians often consider the religious sentiments of the public. There has traditionally been a prevailing sense of national cohesion across ethnic and religious lines in the country, owing to the unifying effect of the war of independence and the common Creole language spoken by most of the population.

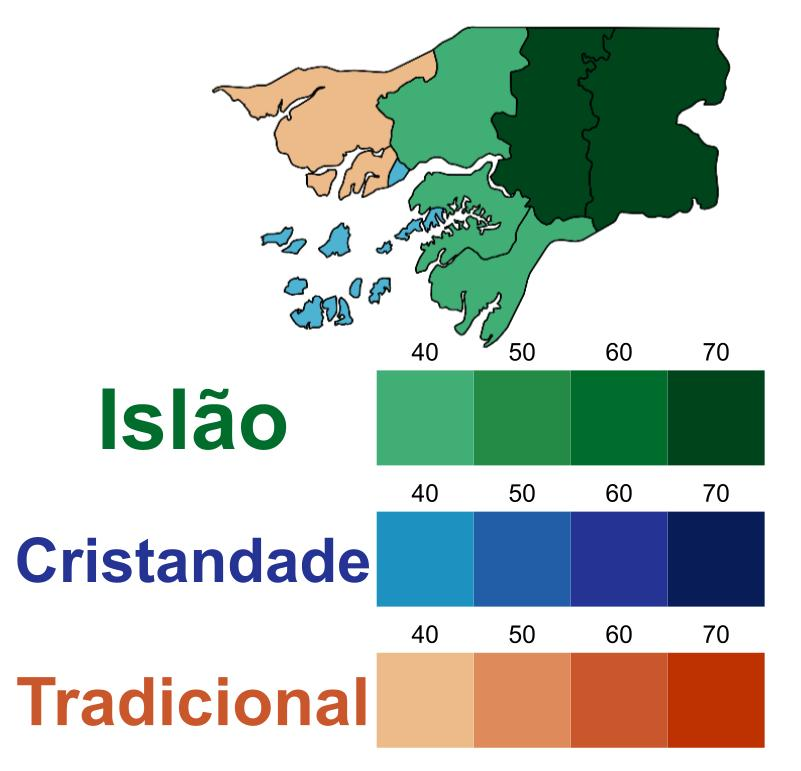
Religion in Guinea-Bissau according to the 2009 census

== Statistics ==
Religion in Guinea-Bissau (Pew Research Center 2010)
1. Christianity (62.0%)
2. Islam (38.0%)

In 2026, a new Pew Research Centre publication estimated that the religious composition of Guinea-Bissau was 56% Muslim, 22% Christian, 12% religiously unaffiliated, and 11% adherent to other religions (including traditional beliefs) as of 2020. The Pew Research Centre estimates that the religiously unaffiliated share of the Bissau-Guinean population has experienced the highest proportional growth between 2010 and 2020, rising from 2% to 12% of the total population. The 2025 Afrobarometer survey in Guinea-Bissau found 49.6% of the 1,200 adult respondents identified as Muslim, 37.8% as Christian, 6.4% as practitioners of traditional ethnoreligions, 5.4% as having no religion, and 0.8% as practising other faiths.

The United States Department mentions that estimates vary greatly and cites the Pew Forum data (2020) of 46% Muslim, 31% indigenous religious practices, and 19% Christian. The 2018 survey conducted by the Vozes do Povo found 47% of respondents identified as Muslim, 39% as Christian, and 9% as Traditionalists.

=== Censuses ===
The 2009 general population and housing census found 45.1% of the population were Muslim, 22.1% Christian, 14.9% Traditionalist, and 2% had no religion. A statistically significant share of the population (15.9%) chose not to respond to the census question on religion, which could be because religious affiliation is considered a very personal matter in Guinea-Bissau.

Religious affiliation
Religion	2009 Census	
Religion	Population	%
Islam	650,402	45.1
Christianity	318,021	22.1
Unanswered	228,718	15.9
Traditional	215,130	14.9
Other	414	0.0
No religion	29,542	2.0
Total	1,442,227	100

==== Religious geography ====
The eastern regions, Bafatá and Gabú, are majority Muslim, with three other regions having a Muslim plurality. Christians represent a plurality of the population in the autonomous sector of Bissau and Bolama region, consisting of the Bijagós Islands. In Cacheu and Biombo, adherents of traditional religions are the largest group though do not form the majority of the population in either region.

Over one in five residents of the Quinara, Oio, Biombo, and Bolama regions chose not to declare their religious affiliation on the census.

Religious composition of each region (2009 census)
Region	Muslim	Christian	Unanswered	Traditional	No religion	Other
Bafatá	77.1%	6.8%	11.3%	3.9%	0.9%	0.0%
Biombo	6.3%	30.2%	20.8%	40.1%	2.5%	0.1%
Bissau	34.2%	40.2%	14.4%	7.9%	3.3%	0.0%
Bolama	14.9%	30.7%	25.7%	24.6%	4.2%	0.0%
Cacheu	14.8%	30.7%	17.3%	34.0%	3.0%	0.2%
Gabú	86.5%	2.6%	10.5%	0.3%	0.1%	0.0%
Oio	42.1%	15.8%	20.5%	20.8%	0.9%	0.0%
Quinara	45.8%	19.4%	21.5%	6.2%	7.1%	0.0%
Tombali	43.0%	14.7%	17.8%	24.1%	0.4%	0.0%
Total	45.1%	22.1%	15.9%	14.9%	2.0%	0.0%

== Christianity ==
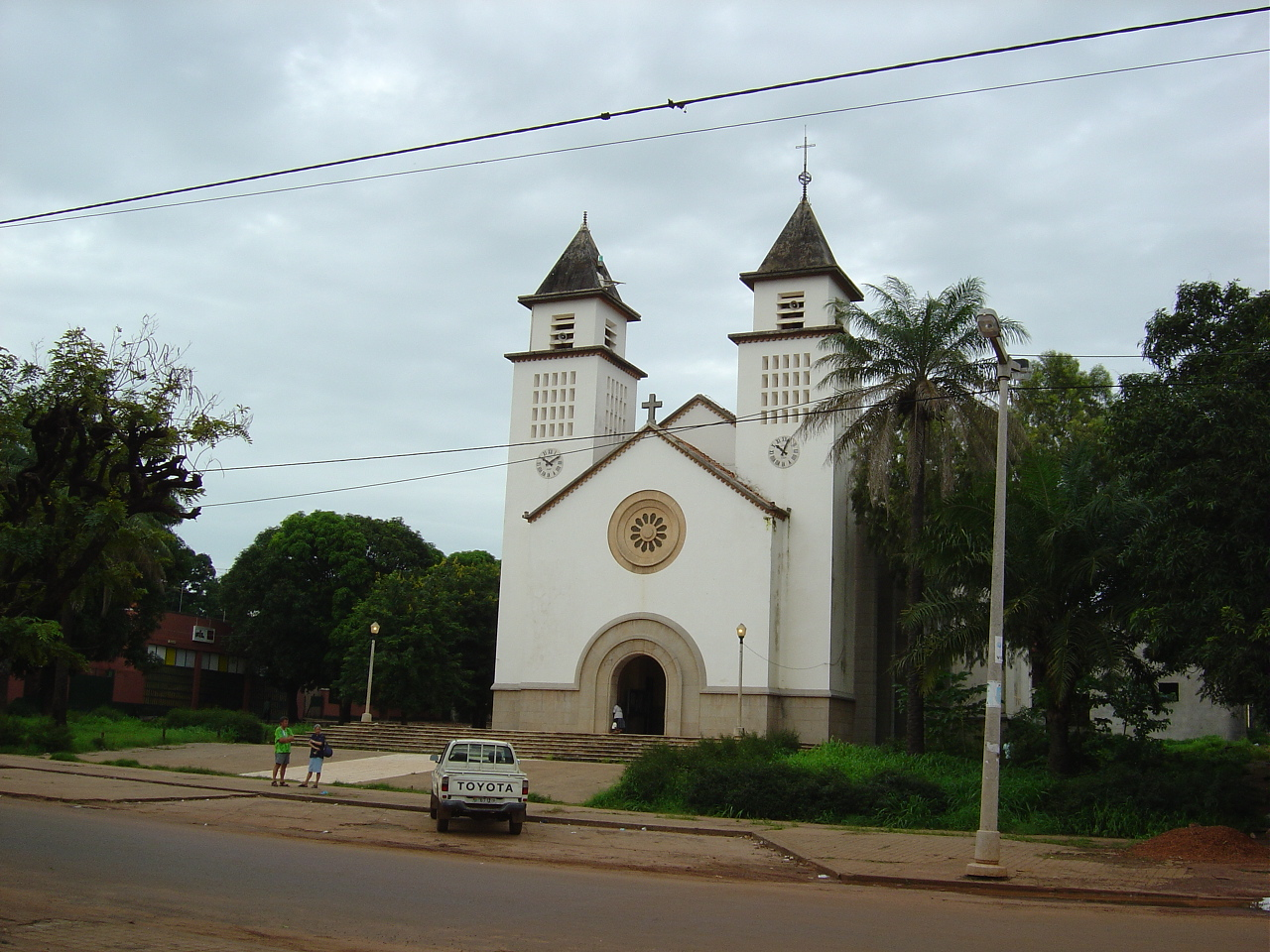
A Church in Bissau.

Christianity arrived in Guinea-Bissau with Portuguese traders and missionaries in the 15th century, but only in its coastal regions. Active missionary efforts started only in the 20th century, and in 1977 it became a diocese of the Holy See. Protestant mission arrived in Guinea-Bissau in 1939, and Evangelical churches have been active through the second half of the 20th century. The Christian missions became a target of destruction during the 1999 civil war in Guinea-Bissau.

According to the 2009 and 1991 censuses of Guinea-Bissau, the practice of Christianity has grown from 15% in 1991 to 22.1% of the total population in 2009; however, Christianity remains concentrated in the coastal regions of the country and the Christian community predominantly consists of the Papel, Manjak, Mankanya, Bijagos, Felupe, and Balanta ethnic groups. Catholics make up over half of the Christian population, whereas Brazilian Protestant denominations and other Protestant groups maintain numerous congregations and missions across the nation. Christianity is perceived to be expanding in Guinea-Bissau, particularly among adherents of traditional religions. It is projected that by 2050, Christians will constitute approximately 30% of the population in Guinea-Bissau.

== Islam ==
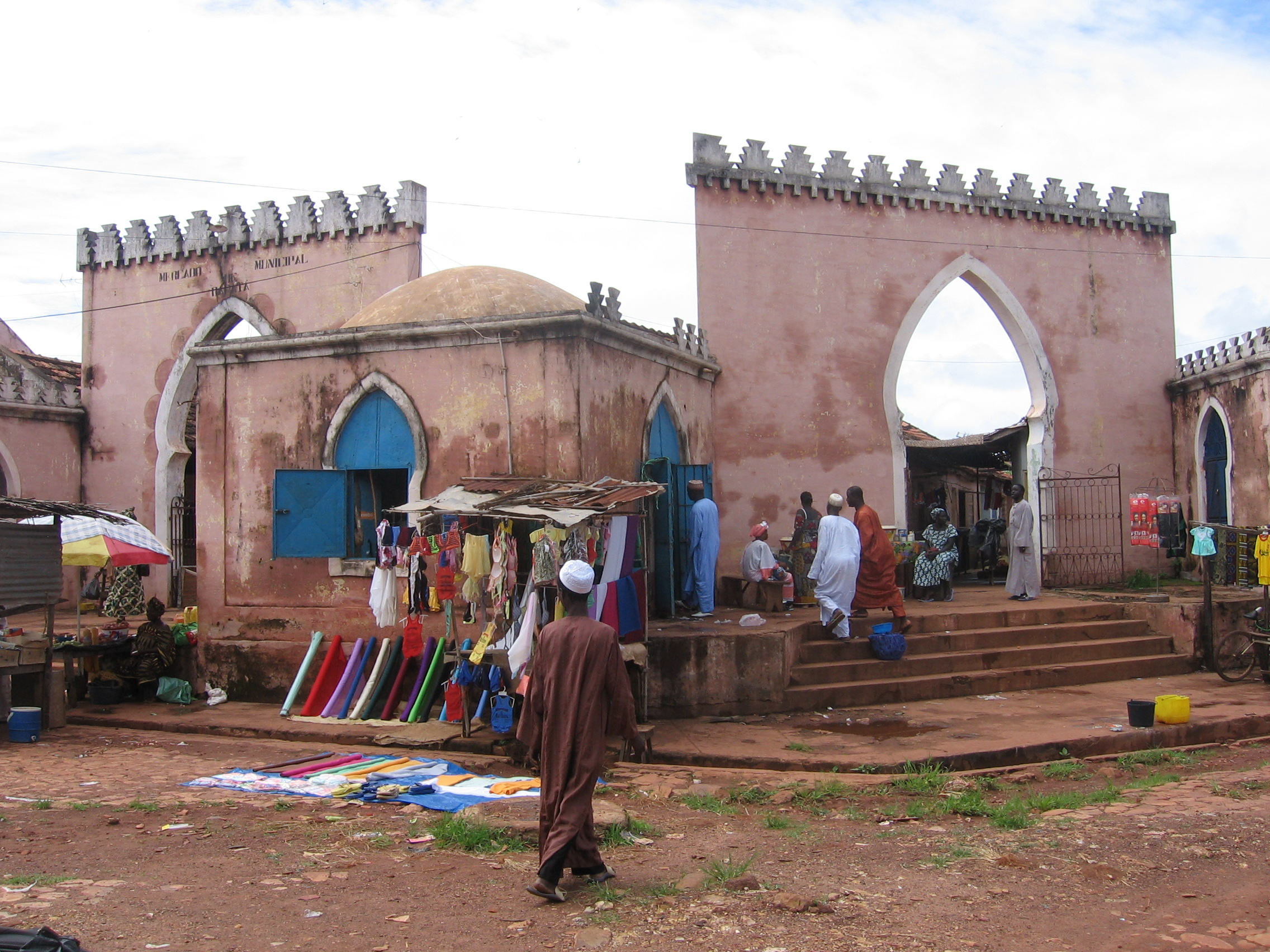
A mosque in Bafatá, Guinea-Bissau.

Most of Guinea-Bissau's Muslims belong to Sunni Islam and follow Sufi orders. Islam is practiced most widely by the Fula, Soninke, Nalu, Biafada, Susu, and Mandinka ethnic groups, and Muslims generally live in the north and northeast.

Islam arrived in Guinea-Bissau before the 12th-century with trans-Saharan traders. Initial growth of Islam was limited to the rulers and trading elites of Guinea-Bissau. Major expansion of Islam among the mainstream happened in the 18th and 19th centuries, after the invasion by Biafada kingdom, and the waves of Fulani jihads that arrived from the north led by Musa Ibrahim, Ibrahim Sori, El Hadj Umar Tall and Koli Tenguella. The share of Muslims is believed to be growing in Guinea-Bissau as a result of increased conversion to Islam, and immigration from neighboring Guinea-Conakry.

== Traditional religion ==
According to Pew Research Centre's 2010 report using a sample size of 1,000 Guinea-Bissau people, the country had 39% of its general population that believed in 6 or more tenants derived from tribal, traditional African, or Animist beliefs. Ancestor veneration is a common practice in the country, with many households containing shrines dedicated to their departed kin. Villages in Guinea-Bissau also often have shrines for guardian spirits, which are seen as important for religious festivals.

The traditional belief systems of Guinea-Bissau are generally animistic in that animals, plants, and other entities of the natural world are seen as possessing souls alongside human beings. Bissau-Guineans of different ethnic backgrounds have customarily safeguarded certain forests, believed to house local spirits (irãs). The increasing conversion of the population to Christianity and Islam has diminished the environmental protection afforded to these sacred forests, contributing to their decline.

== Freedom of religion ==
The Constitution sees freedom of conscience and religion as inviolable and provides for freedom of worship.

In 2023, the country scored 3 out of 4 for religious freedom.

== See also ==
- Christianity in Guinea-Bissau
- Islam in Guinea-Bissau
- Roman Catholicism in Guinea-Bissau
