= Islam in Guinea-Bissau =

The CIA World Factbook (2020 estimate) states that around 46.1% of the population are Muslims, 30.6% adhere to traditional faiths, 18.9% are Christians, and 4.4% are non-religious or practice other religions. Meanwhile, the US State Department mentions that estimates vary greatly and cites the Pew Forum data (2020) of 46% Muslim, 31% indigenous religious practices, and 19% Christian.

Christians are mostly found along the coastal regions, and belong to the Roman Catholic Church (including Portuguese Bissau-Guineans) and various Protestant denominations. In 2017, Sunni Islam, including that of Sufi-oriented, were most concentrated in the northern and northeastern parts of the country, while practitioners of traditional indigenous religious beliefs generally live in all but the northern parts of the country. The vast majority of Muslims in the country are Sunni of Maliki school of jurisprudence, with Sufi influences. Sizeable communities of Ahmadiyya Muslims also exist in some urban centers.

== Ahmadiyya ==
Ahmadiyya is an Islamic community in Guinea-Bissau, under the leadership of the caliph in London. First established in the country in 1995, during the era of the Fourth Caliphate, in 2012, the Community represented an estimated 2% of the country's Muslim population, corresponding to approximately 13,000 people.

== See also ==
- Religion in Guinea-Bissau
- Ahmadiyya in Guinea-Bissau
