= Timeline of Bissau =

Bissau is a city in Guinea-Bissau, a country in West Africa, formerly part of the kingdom of Kaabu and part of the Mali Empire.

== Prior to 20th century ==
- 1687 – Portuguese trading post established in region of Papel people.
- 1692 – Portuguese colonial Captaincy of Bissau founded.
- 1707 – Portuguese fort dismantled and abandoned.
- 1753 – Portuguese overcome Papel resistance, rebuild fort.
- 1775 – Fortaleza de São José da Amura (fort) built.
- 1859 – Municipal Council founded.
- 1863 – Bissau attains town status.
- 1869
  - Bissau becomes capital of the colonial district of Guinea.
  - Population: 573.

== 20th century ==
- 1917 – Bissau attains city status.
- 1935 – Bissau Cathedral built.
- 1936 – Sporting Clube de Bissau formed.
- 1937 – Estrela Negra de Bissau football club formed.
- 1941 – Capital of colonial Portuguese Guinea moves to Bissau from Bolama.
- 1944 – Sport Bissau e Benfica (football club) formed.
- 1948 – City Market construction begins.
- 1950s – Craveiro Lopes (airport) built.
- 1950 – Population: 18,309.
- 1959 – 3 August: Dockworkers strike at Porto Pidjiguiti; crackdown.
- 1960 – Canal do Impernal (channel) dries up; Bissau no longer an island in the Geba River estuary.
- 1968 – City besieged during the Guinea-Bissau War of Independence.
- 1971 – City besieged during the War of Independence.
- 1973 – Africa Bottling Company Lda in business.
- 1974 – City becomes capital of newly independent Guinea-Bissau.
- 1977 – Roman Catholic Diocese of Bissau established.
- 1979 – Population: 109,214.
- 1984 – National Library of Guinea-Bissau headquartered in city.
- 1985 – City joins the newly formed União das Cidades Capitais Luso-Afro-Américo-Asiáticas.
- 1989 – Estádio 24 de Setembro (stadium) opens.
- 1990 – 27 January: Catholic pope visits city.
- 1991
  - Instituto Nacional de Estatística (Guinea-Bissau) headquartered in city.
  - Population: 197,600.
- 1992 – Correio-Bissau newspaper begins publication.
- 1996 – Rádio Bombolom begins broadcasting.
- 1998
  - 7 June: Guinea-Bissau Civil War begins; residents flee from the city.
  - Hotel Hotti Bissau in business.
- 1999 – 10 May: Guinea-Bissau Civil War ends.

== 21st century ==
- 2002 – Population: 292,000.
- 2005 – National People's Assembly Palácio Colinas de Boé built.
- 2008 – TV Guiné-Bissau begins broadcasting.
- 2009
  - 2 March: Assassination of president Vieira.
  - Population: 387,909.
- 2010 – Hospital Amizade China-Guine-Bissau opens.
- 2012 – 12 April: 2012 Guinea-Bissau coup d'état.
- 2022 – 1 February: 2022 Guinea-Bissau coup d'état attempt

== See also ==
- Bissau history (de)
- List of governors of Portuguese Guinea, seated at Bissau 1941–1974
- History of Guinea-Bissau

== Bibliography ==
in English

- I. Lourenco-Lindell (1997). "Food for the poor, food for the city: the role of urban agriculture in Bissau". Geographical Journal of Zimbabwe (28). ISSN 1011-5919.
- Paul Tiyambe Zeleza; Dickson Eyoh, eds. (2003). "Bissau, Guinea-Bissau". Encyclopedia of Twentieth-Century African History. Routledge. ISBN 0415234794.
- Ilda Lourenço-Lindell (2004). "Trade and the politics of informalization in Bissau, Guinea-Bissau". In Karen Tranberg Hansen; Mariken Vaa (eds.). Reconsidering Informality: Perspectives from Urban Africa. Uppsala: Nordiska Afrikainstitutet. ISBN 978-91-7106-518-6. OCLC 654131452.
- Eric Young (2005). "Bissau, Guinea-Bissau". In Kwame Anthony Appiah; Henry Louis Gates (eds.). Africana: The Encyclopedia of the African and African American Experience (2nd ed.). Oxford University Press. p. 472. ISBN 978-0-19-517055-9.
- Roman A. Cybriwsky (2013). "Bissau". Capital Cities around the World: An Encyclopedia of Geography, History, and Culture. ABC-CLIO. pp. 52–53. ISBN 978-1-61069-248-9.
- Manuel Rambout Barcelos (2006). "Masked children in an urban scene: the Bissau Carnival". In Simon Ottenberg; David Aaron Binkley (eds.). Playful Performers: African Children's Masquerades. Transaction Publishers. ISBN 978-1-351-49950-7.

in other languages

- Esteves Pereira; Guilherme Rodrigues, eds. (1906). "Bissau". Portugal: Diccionario Historico... (in Portuguese). Vol. 2. Lisbon: Joao Romano Torres. hdl:2027/gri.ark:/13960/t6m081q3b. OCLC 865826167.
- Joel Frederico da Silveira (1989). "Spatialisation d'un rapport colonial: Bissau, 1900-1960". In Michel Cahen (ed.). Vilas et cidades: bourgs et villes en Afrique lusophone (in French). Paris: L'Harmattan. ISBN 2-7384-0431-6.
- François Mendy (2006). La ville de Bissau: amenagement et gestion urbaine (Ph.D.) (in French). Universite Cheikh Anta Diop de Dakar.
- Ana Vaz Milheiro; Eduardo Costa Dias (2009). "Arquitectura em Bissau e os Gabinetes de Urbanização colonial (1944–1974)" [Architecture in Bissau and the Colonial Urbanization Departments] (PDF). Arq.urb (in Portuguese) (2). São Paulo: Universidade São Judas Tadeu. ISSN 1984-5766.
