= Mankanya =

Mankanya may refer to:

- Mankanya language
- Mankanya people
