= Mass media in Guinea-Bissau =

Mass media in Guinea-Bissau includes print, radio, television, and the Internet. "The Conselho Nacional de Comunicação Social regulates the press." The government-run Guinea-Bissau National Radio began in 1973 and Guinea-Bissau Television began in 1987.

== Radio ==
- Guinea-Bissau National Radio
- Radio Bafata
- Rádio Bombolom
- Rádio Jovem
- Radio Mavegro
- Radio Nacional
- Radio Pindjiguiti
- Radio Sintcha Oco
- Rádio Sol Mansi

== Television ==
- Guinea-Bissau Television (TGB)
- RTP África
- TV Klelé (est. 2013)

== Publications ==
Print and online publications include:

- Banobero
- Bissau Digital
- Boletim Oficial da Guiné-Bissau
- Comdev Negocios
- Correio-Bissau
- Diario de Bissau
- Expresso de Bissau
- Fraskera
- Gazeta de Noticias
- Kansare
- Nô Pintcha
- Ultima Hora
- Voz de Bissau
- Wandan

== See also ==
- Telecommunications in Guinea-Bissau
- List of Bissau-Guinean films
- Telephone numbers in Guinea-Bissau

== Bibliography ==
- Toyin Falola; Daniel Jean-Jacques, eds. (2015). "Guinea-Bissau: Media". Africa: an Encyclopedia of Culture and Society. ABC-CLIO. ISBN 978-1-59884-666-9.
- "Guinea-Bissau", Freedom of the Press, USA: Freedom House, 2016, OCLC 57509361
