= Francisco Mendes =

Prime Minister of Guinea-Bissau from 1973 to 1978

- Chico Mendes at his wedding party in Ziguinchor, Senegal (1973)

1st Prime Minister of Guinea-Bissau
- In office September 24, 1973 – July 7, 1978
- President: Luís Cabral
- Succeeded by: Constantino Teixeira

Personal details
- Born: 7 February 1939 Enxude, Portuguese Guinea (present-day Guinea-Bissau)
- Died: 7 July 1978 (aged 39) Bissau, Guinea-Bissau
- Party: African Party for the Independence of Guinea and Cape Verde
- Occupation: Politician

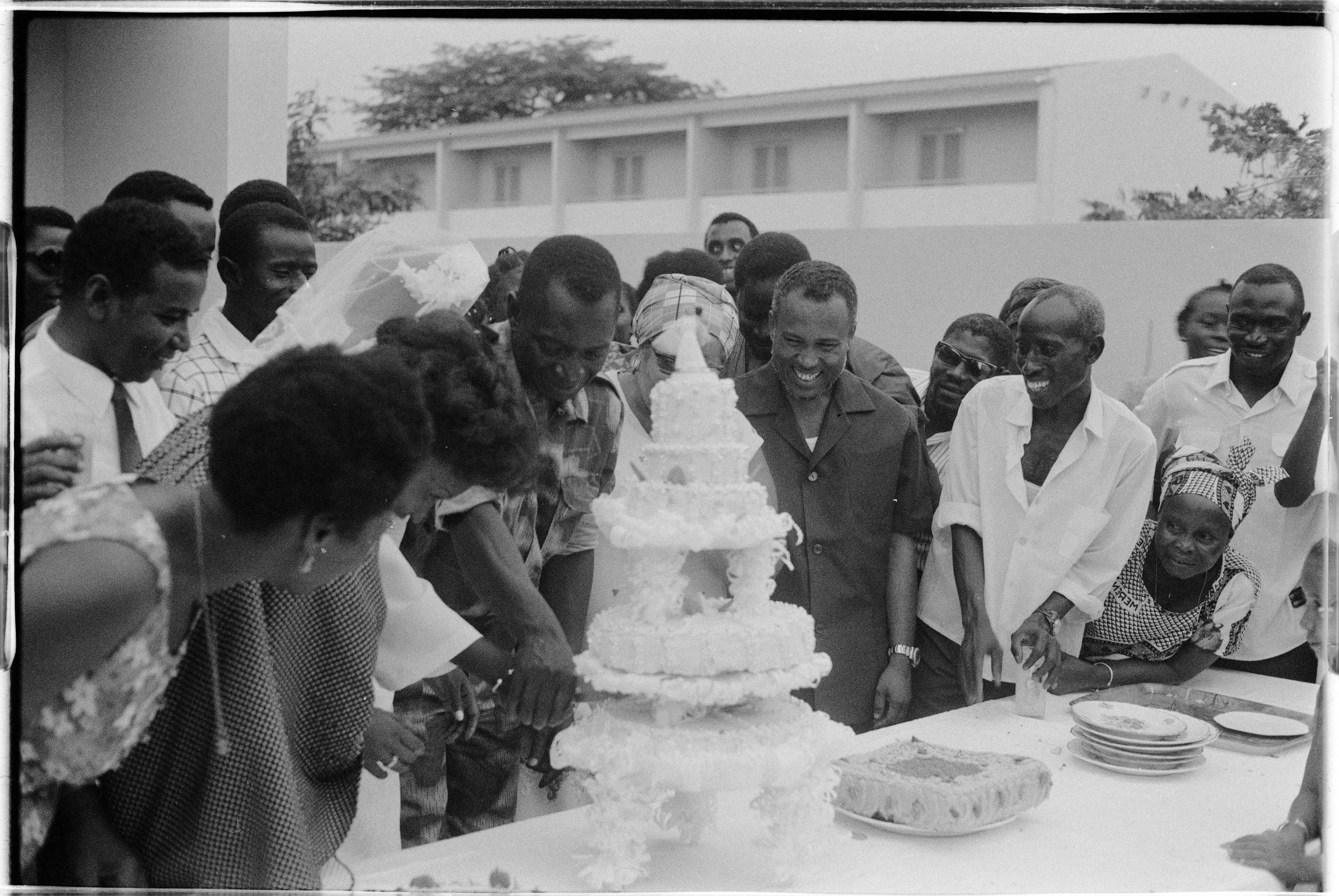
Chico Mendes' marriage party in Ziguinchor, Senegal with Luís Cabral to the right of the cake, 1973

Francisco Mendes, popularly known by his nom de guerre as Chico Té (February 7, 1939 – July 7, 1978), was a Bissau-Guinean politician and revolutionary. He was the country's first Prime Minister and held that position from September 24, 1973, until he died in a suspicious car accident on July 7, 1978.

== Early career ==
Mendes was born on February 7, 1939 in Enxude, Guinea-Bissau. In the early 1960s, the African Party for the Independence of Guinea and Cape Verde (PAIGC) launched an armed struggle against Portuguese imperialism which would last more than a decade. Mendes was one of the few Guinea-Bissau students in secondary education when he abandoned school to join the PAIGC. He rose through the ranks in the 1960s, becoming a political commissar of the Bafatá area in 1962. In the years 1963–1964 he held the same function on the Northern Front. He entered the Political Bureau in 1964 and he became a member of PAIGC's Council of War in 1965. In 1967 he was appointed delegate of the Council for the Northern Front.

== Prime minister ==
After negotiations between Portugal and PAIGC in early 1974, Portugal granted independence to Guinea-Bissau despite PAIGC having declared unilateral independence nearly a year prior. The PAIGC-led government was headed by Luís Cabral, half-brother of the PAIGC co-founder Amílcar Cabral whose assassination in Conakry on January 20, 1973, remains a mystery. Francisco Mendes was elected the country's first Prime Minister as Comissário Principal, and in this role was responsible for a series of socialism-inspired development programs and a four-year drive toward national reconciliation. Mendes' signature graced the first four banknotes (10, 50, 100 and 500 peso) issued in 1976 in Guinea-Bissau.

Although the causes behind his death on July 7, 1978, are still disputed, it is mostly accepted that PAIGC was involved in it. A widely accepted theory – though unverifiable as of 2006 – is that dissent among PAIGC leadership may have led to his assassination.

== Honours ==
As an African nationalist and a national figure in the struggle for independence, Francisco Mendes has been honoured both in Guinea-Bissau and Cape Verde. In addition to his face being featured on 500 Pesos Guineense (second (1983) and third (1990) issues), many schools and streets bearing his name can be found throughout Guinea-Bissau, and Francisco Mendes International Airport in Praia, Cape Verde was named in his honour.

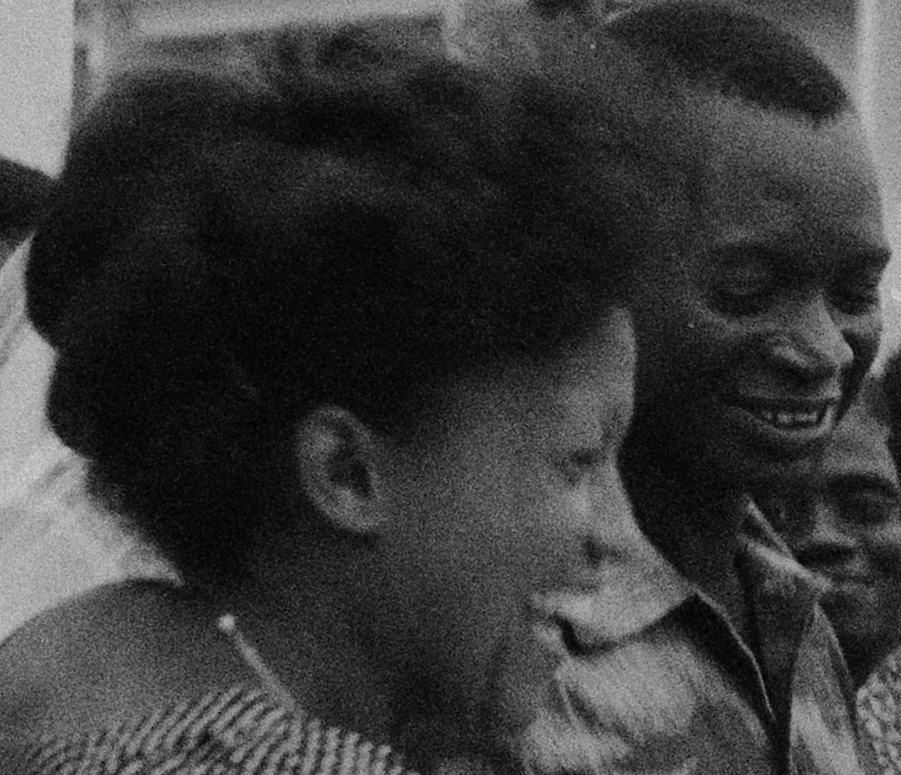
Chico Mendes and Luís Cabral's wife at Mendes' marriage in Ziguinchor, Senegal, 1973, detail

== Personal life ==
He married in 1973 in Ziguinchor, Senegal and left two sons and two daughters behind.
