= Telecommunications in Guinea-Bissau =

Telecommunications in Guinea-Bissau include radio, television, fixed and mobile telephones, and the Internet.

Guinea-Bissau is one of the poorest countries in the world. This reality is reflected in the state of the country's telecommunications development. It is estimated that in 2012 there were only 5000 fixed telephone lines serving the country's 1.6 million inhabitants and that only 2.9% of the population had access to and were regular users of the Internet.

== Radio and television ==
- Radio stations:
  - One state-owned radio station (Guinea-Bissau National Radio), several private radio stations, and some community radio stations; multiple international broadcasters are available (2007);
  - One AM, four FM, and no shortwave (2001).
- Radios: 49,000 (1997).
- Television stations: One state-owned TV station (Guinea-Bissau Television) and a second station, Radio e Televisao de Portugal África (RTP África), operated by Portuguese public broadcaster (RTP) (2007).

Private radio stations operate alongside the state-run broadcaster. Broadcasters face many challenges, not least the lack of a reliable power supply. The media experience "harsh treatment" from the authorities, security forces, and individuals with connections to the military and drug traffickers. A climate of fear has led to self-censorship among the media, which particularly affects reporting on drug trafficking.

Following the 12 April 2012 coup, the junta shut down all private radio stations and the national television station. They allowed only the national broadcaster, Guinea-Bissau National Radio, to broadcast intermittent military communiqués. On 15 April, the junta allowed the stations to reopen, but on 16 April warned them not to criticize the military or the coup or report on protests. These threats continued until 25 May when the civilian government was installed.

== Telephones ==
- Calling code: +245
- International call prefix: 00
- Main lines:
  - 5,000 lines in use, 210th in the world (2012);
  - 4,600 lines in use, 214th in the world (2008).
- Mobile cellular:
  - 1.1 million lines, 156th in the world (2012);
  - 500,200 lines, 155th in the world (2008).
- Telephone system: small system including a combination of microwave radio relay, open-wire lines, radiotelephone, and mobile-cellular communications; fixed-line teledensity is less than 1 per 100 persons; mobile-cellular teledensity approached 50 per 100 persons (2011).

== Internet ==
- Top-level domain: .gw
- Internet users:
  - 47,132 users, 181st in the world; 2.9% of the population, 196th in the world (2012);
  - 37,100 users, 177th in the world (2009).
- Fixed broadband: Unknown (2012).
- Wireless broadband: Unknown (2012).
- Internet hosts:
  - 90 hosts, 211th in the world (2012);
  - 82 hosts, 202nd in the world (2009).
- IPv4: 5,120 addresses allocated, less than 0.05% of the world total, 3.1 addresses per 1000 people (2012).

=== Internet censorship and surveillance ===
There are no government restrictions on access to the Internet or reports that the government monitors e-mail or Internet chat rooms without judicial oversight.

The constitution and law provide for freedom of speech and press; however, there are reports that the government does not always respect these rights. The constitution and law prohibit arbitrary interference with privacy, family, home, or correspondence, but the government does not always respect these prohibitions in practice. Police routinely ignore privacy rights and protections against unreasonable search and seizure.

== See also ==
- Guinea-Bissau National Radio, national broadcaster.
- Guinea-Bissau Television, national television
- Media of Guinea-Bissau
