= Portuguese Guinean escudo =

Currency of Portuguese Guinea between 1914 and 1975

ISO 4217
- Code: GWE until 1981; named Guinea EscudoISO 4217 Standard definition: "Data Standards, ISO 4217 - Currency Code Maintenance: Get the Correct Currency Code". www.six-group.com. SIX Group. 2022-10-01.; "List One: Currency, fund and precious metal codes" (XLS). www.six-group.com. SIX Group. 2022-09-23.; "List Two: Fund codes registered with the Maintenance Agency" (XLS). www.six-group.com. SIX Group. 2018-08-29.; "List Three: Codes for historic denominations of currencies and funds" (XLS). www.six-group.com. SIX Group. 2018-08-22.; "Overview Amendments" (XLSX). www.six-group.com. SIX Group. 2022-09-23.

Denominations
- Subunit
- 1/100: centavo
- Banknotes: 50, 100, 500, 1000 escudos
- Coins: 10, 20, 50 centavos, 1, 2 1/2, 5, 10, 20 escudos

Demographics
- User(s): Portuguese Guinea

Issuance
- Bank of issue: Banco Nacional Ultramarino
- This infobox shows the latest status before this currency was rendered obsolete.

The escudo was the currency of Portuguese Guinea between 1914 and 1973 and of independent Guinea-Bissau from 1973 to 1975. It was equal to the Portuguese escudo and replaced the real at a rate of 1000 réis = 1 escudo. The escudo was subdivided into 100 centavos. Portugal issued banknotes (starting in 1914) and coins (starting in 1933) for use in Portuguese Guinea. Following independence, the peso replaced the escudo at par.

== Coins ==
In 1933, coins were introduced in denominations of 5, 10, 20 and 50 centavos and 1 escudo. Coins of 2 1/2, 10 and 20 escudos were added in 1952, with 5 escudos coins introduced in 1973.

== Banknotes ==
In 1914, notes were issued by the Banco Nacional Ultramarino in denominations of 10, 20 and 50 centavos. In 1921, larger denominations, from 1 escudo up to 100 escudos, were introduced. 500 escudos notes were first issued in 1945, with 1000 escudos notes introduced in 1964.
