= National Broadcasting of Guinea-Bissau =

The National Broadcasting of Guinea-Bissau (RDN; in Portuguese: Radiodifusão Nacional da Guiné-Bissau), also known only as National Radio (in Portuguese: Rádio Nacional), is a public broadcasting company in Guinea-Bissau, whose head office is located in Bissau.

The RDN operates three radio stations in the country - Bissau (in city suburb of Nhacra), Catió and Gabu -, in addition to several regional stations and an international broadcast service. A network of transmitters allows the radio to cover about 80% of the country, in frequency modulation (91.5 / 104.0 FM).

The broadcasts are made mostly in Portuguese, and also have programs in the national languages of the country, namely: Creole, Fula, Balanta, Susso, Mankanya, Papel, Bijago, Felupe, Mandinka, Manjak, Beafada, Balanta Mané, Pajadinka and Nalu.

== Historic ==
The current RDN arose from the merger of two important broadcasting services that were installed in Guinea-Bissau still in the colonial period, which operated with clearly divergent objectives. The oldest was the public state broadcaster, called the "Official Broadcaster of Portuguese Guinea", started in 1944, and; the other broadcasting service was called "Radio Liberation", started in 1964 on the initiative of nationalist activists who were fighting for the independence of Guinea-Bissau.

The unification of services would only occur in post-independence, on 10 September 1974, under the administration of Agnelo Regalla.

Its staff entered a five-day strike period on August 6, 2018.

RDN was occupied by the military on December 4, 2023, while the station was broadcasting a news bulletin. The station was suspended until a second order.

== See also ==
- Guinea-Bissau Television
