= Portuguese Guinean real =

The real (plural réis) was the currency of Portuguese Guinea until 1914. It was equal to the Portuguese real. Paper money specifically for Portuguese Guinea was first issued in 1909, supplementing Portuguese currency. Denominations were between 1 000 an 50 000 réis.

The real was replaced by the escudo at a rate of 1 escudo = 1 000 réis.
