= Agnelo Regalla =

Bissau-Guinean politician

- Born: Agnelo Augusto Regalla; 9 July 1952 (age 73); Tombali Region, Guinea-Bissau
- Occupations: Poet, journalist, and politician

Agnelo Augusto Regalla, also known by his pseudonym Sakala (born 9 July 1952), is a Bissau-Guinean poet, journalist, and politician.

== Biography ==
Regalla was born in 1952 in the small town of Campeane in the Tombali Region. He studied journalism in France at the Journalist Training Center. He reorganized and directed the National Broadcasting of Guinea-Bissau organization from 1974 to 1977, and later founded the private station Bombolom FM in 1996.

He was director-general of the Ministry of Foreign Businesses from 1987 to 1990, and was the secretary of the state of information for the Ministry of Information from 1984 to 1985 and again from 1990 to 1991. He was the president of the Union for Change party was elected as a deputy from the party to the National People's Assembly from 1994 to 1998. Between September 2009 and January 2012, he was communication advisor and spokesman to then-president Malam Bacai Sanhá. In 2018, he was nominated by prime minister Aristides Gomes as president of the Council of Ministers and Parliamentary Subjects.

Regalla's texts have been published in various anthologies such as Mantenhas para quem Luta, a piece published by the National Council of Culture in 1993 by Regalla composed of Bissau-Guinean writers dubbed by Angolan poet Mário Pinto de Andrade as the "Meninos da Hora de Pindjiguiti". Regalla was one of the founders of the Writer's Association of Guinea-Bissau on 10 October 2013.
