= National Bank of Guinea-Bissau =

Former central bank of Guinea-Bissau

National Bank of Guinea-Bissau Banco Nacional da Guiné-Bissau
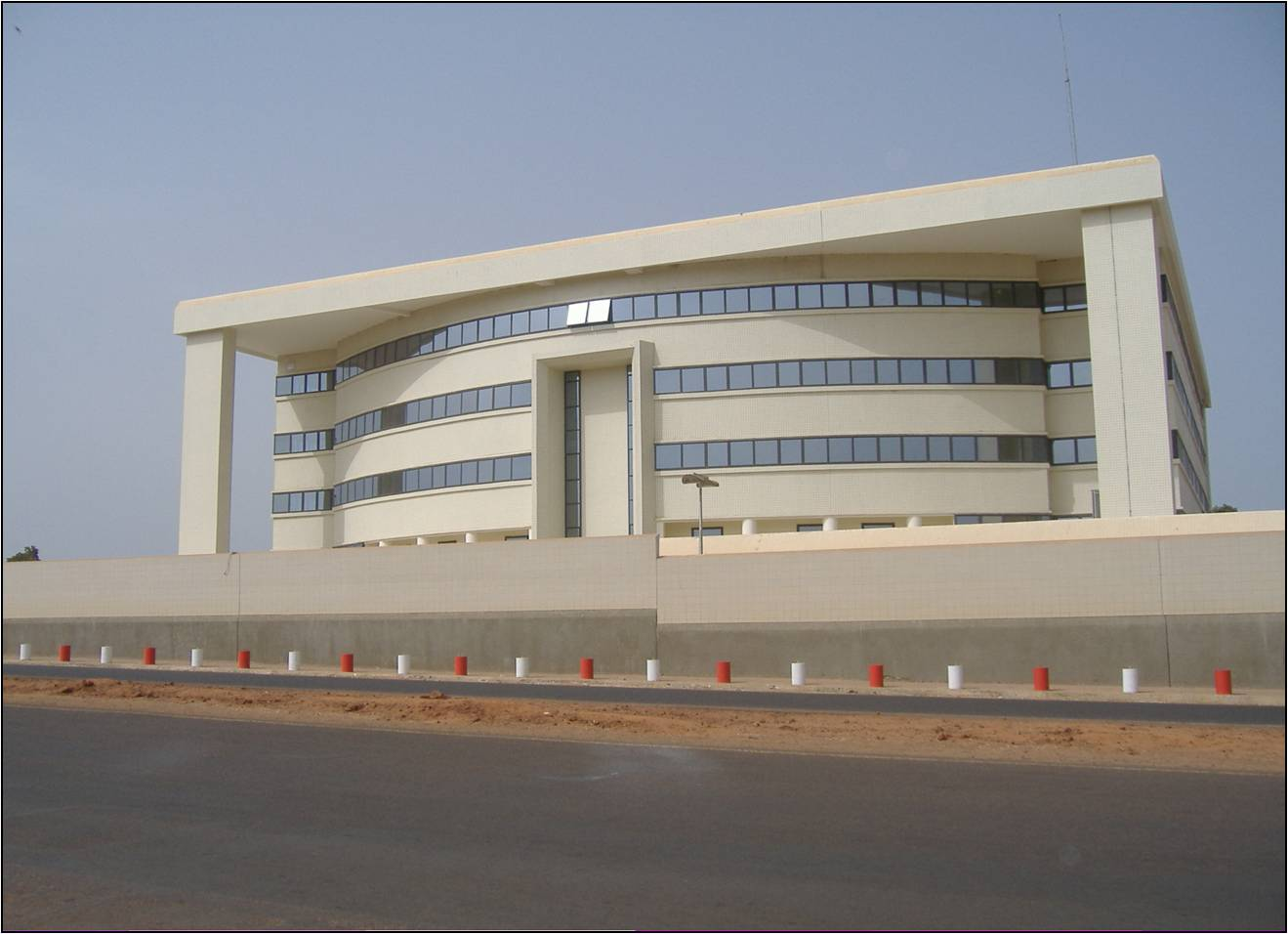
- National bank building in Bissau (photo taken in 2008)
- Headquarters: Bissau
- Established: February 1975
- Central bank of: Guinea-Bissau
- Currency: Guinea-Bissau peso (GWP); GWP (ISO 4217)
- National Bank of Guinea-Bissau was converted to a national branch of Central Bank of West African States

The National Bank of Guinea-Bissau (Portuguese: Banco Nacional da Guiné-Bissau or BNG) was the central bank of Guinea-Bissau from February 1975 until May 1997, when Guinea-Bissau joined the Central Bank of West African States.

== History ==
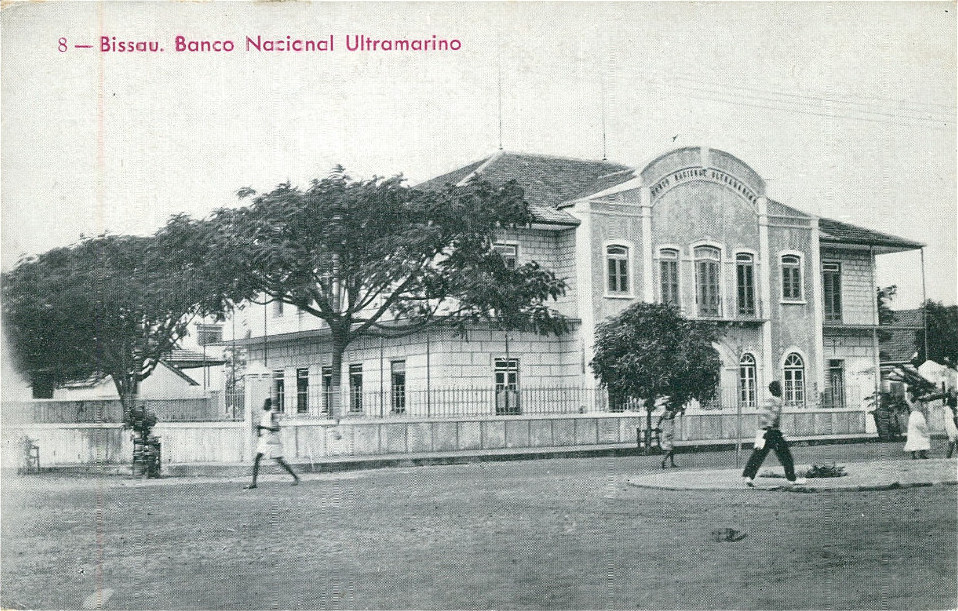
Banco Nacional Ultramarino building in Bissau, 1920s

At independence in February 1975, Guinea-Bissau nationalized the Banco Nacional Ultramarino, Portuguese bank's branch, and transformed it into the country's central bank. The currency, Portuguese escudo, was replaced with Guinea-Bissau peso. In 1990, the bank was renamed as the Central Bank of Guinea Bissau (Banco Central da Guiné-Bissau).

In May 1997 Guinea-Bissau joined the francophone West African Monetary Union Union Économique et Monétaire Ouest-Africaine (UEMOA). Consequently, National Bank of Guinea-Bissau was converted as a national branch of Central Bank of West African States (BCEAO), and national currency Guinea Bissau peso was replaced by West African CFA franc.

== Governors ==
Governors of the National Bank since independence

- Victor Freire Monteiro, February 1975 - July 1982
- Pedro A. Godinho Gomes, July 1982 - April 1992
- Luis Candido Ribeiro, April 1992 - March 1995
- de Sousa, March 1995 - July 1997

== See also ==
- Economy of Guinea-Bissau
- Minister of Finance (Guinea-Bissau)
- List of central banks of Africa
