= Francisco Mendes International Airport =

Former airport of Praia, Cape Verde (1961–2005)

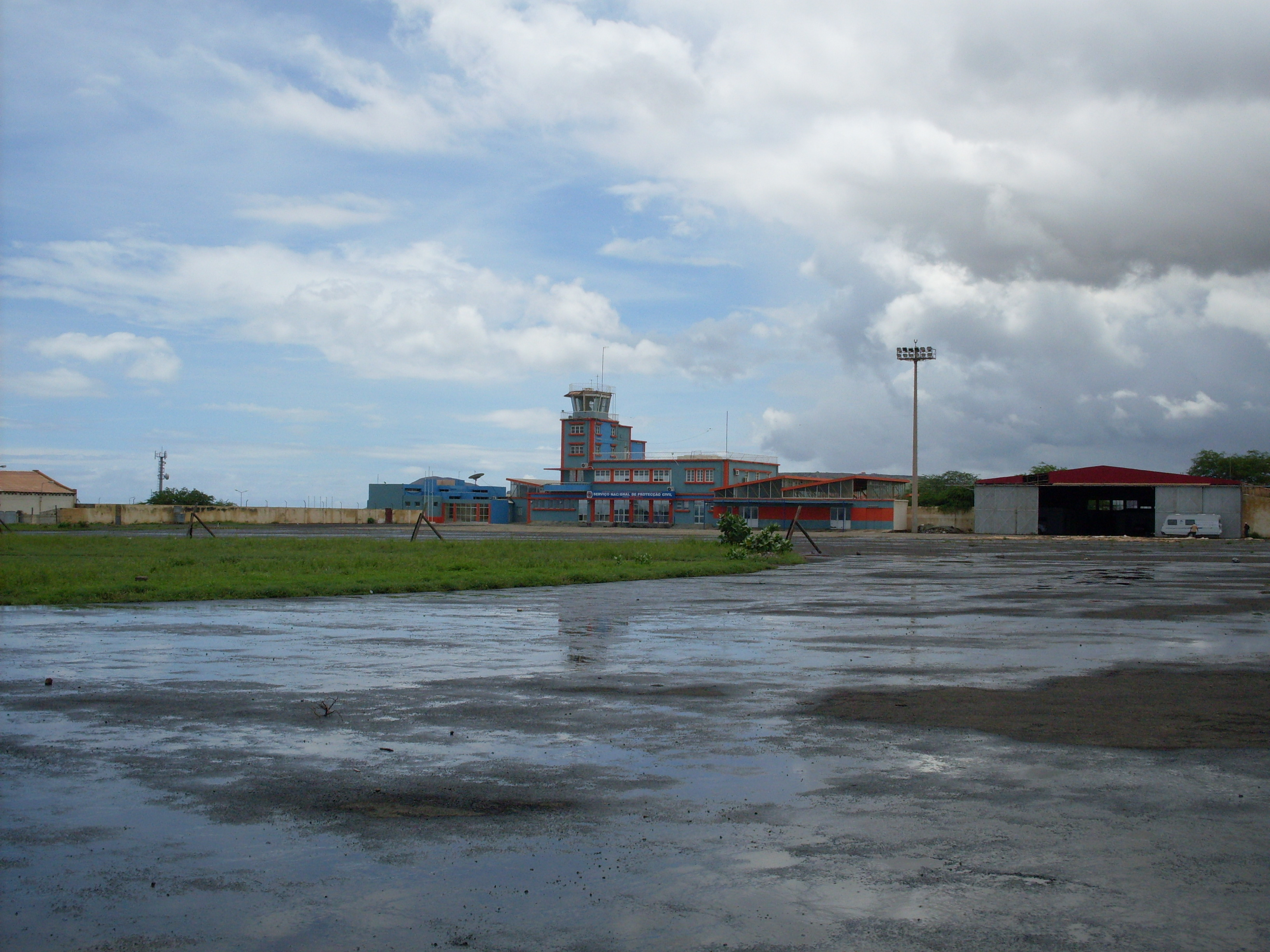
- IATA: RAI; ICAO: GVFM

Summary
- Airport type: Defunct
- Operator: Aeroportos e Segurança Aérea (ASA)
- Location: Praia, Cape Verde
- Opened: 1961
- Closed: 6 October 2005
- Coordinates: 14.9261°N 23.4948°W
- Interactive map of Francisco Mendes International Airport

Francisco Mendes International Airport (IATA: RAI, ICAO: GVFM) was an airport located on Santiago Island in Cape Verde. It was opened in 1961. It was located about 2 km (1.2 mi) east of central Praia in the southeastern part of the island of Santiago. After Cape Verdean independence, the airport was named after Francisco Mendes, a Guinea-Bissau independence activist and that country's first Prime Minister.

== History ==
On 28 September 1998, a TACV de Havilland Canada DHC-6 Twin Otter (registered D4-CAX) carrying Carlos Veiga, then Prime Minister of Cape Verde, 18 other passengers and three crew members crash-landed at the airport. There was one fatality (a bodyguard of the prime minister) and four people were injured.

== Closure ==
In late 2005, the airport was deactivated, and replaced by the new Praia International Airport (since 2012 Nelson Mandela International Airport).
