= Papel languages =

Dialect continuum of Guinea-Bissau, Senegal, and The Gambia

Papel
- Geographic distribution: The Gambia, Senegal (esp. Casamance) and Guinea-Bissau
- Linguistic classification: Niger–Congo?: Atlantic–Congo; Bak–Bijago; Bak proper; Jola–Papel; Papel
- Subdivisions: Mankanya; Mandjak; Papel

Language codes
- ISO 639-3: –
- Glottolog: manj1250

The Papel languages of southern Senegal, Gambia, and northwestern Guinea-Bissau are an uncontroversial cluster of the Bak languages and form a dialect continuum. All of these names are exonyms.

== Classification ==
Doneux (1975) classifies the Manjaku (Papel) languages as follows.

- Manjaku
  - Mankañ
    - Hula
    - Woo
  - Cur
  - Central
    - Bok
      - Lund
      - Bok
      - Tsaam
      - Siärär
    - Coastal
      - Yu
      - Sis
      - Pèpèl

== See also ==
- Proto-Manjaku reconstructions (Wiktionary)
