= Guinea-Bissau peso =

Former currency of Guinea-Bissau

peso da Guiné-Bissau (Portuguese)
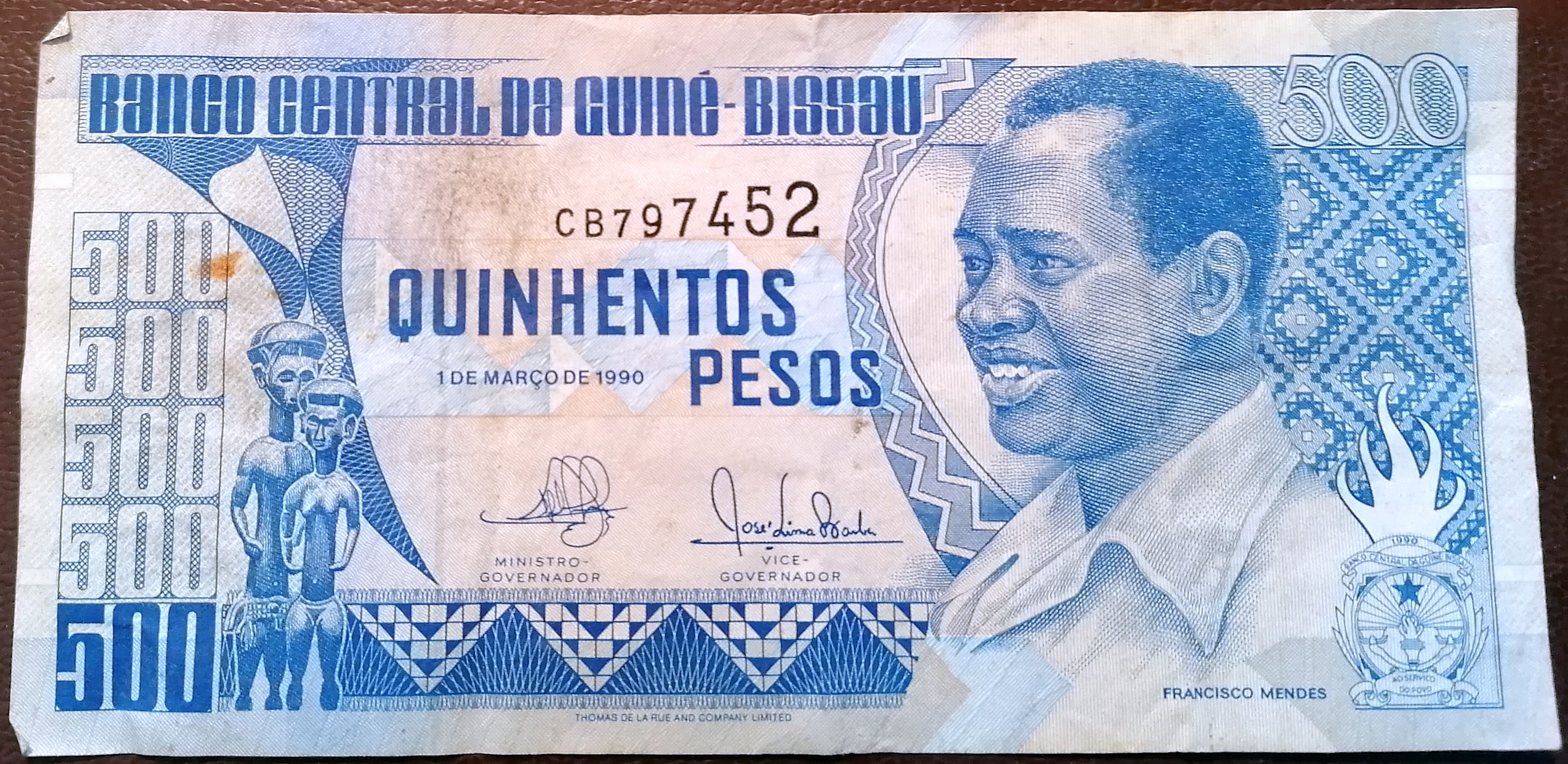
- 500 pesos banknote from 1990

ISO 4217
- Code: GWP

Denominations
- Subunit
- 1/100: centavos
- Banknotes: 50, 100, 500, 1000, 5000, 10,000 pesos
- Coins: 50 centavos, 1, 2 1/2, 5, 20 pesos

Demographics
- Date of introduction: 1975
- Replaced: Portuguese Guinean escudo
- Date of withdrawal: 1997
- User(s): Guinea-Bissau

Issuance
- Central bank: National Bank of Guinea-Bissau
- This infobox shows the latest status before this currency was rendered obsolete.

The peso was the currency of Guinea-Bissau from 1975 to 1997 and was divided into 100 centavos. It replaced the escudo at par. In 1997, in an effort to stop high inflation, Guinea-Bissau adopted the CFA franc, using a conversion rate of 65 pesos to the franc.

== History ==
The peso replaced the escudo in 1975. It was originally equivalent to the Portuguese escudo.

=== Historical exchange rates ===
- 1975–1976: fixed exchange rate with the Portuguese escudo at parity.
- 1976–1977: fixed exchange rate with the Portuguese escudo (0.85 GWP = 1.00 PTE)
- 1977–1978: fixed exchange rate with the Portuguese escudo (0.74 GWP = 1.00 PTE)
- 26 May 1978 – 22 December 1983: fixed exchange rate with the special drawing rights at a rate of 44 pesos per SDR.
- 23 December 1983: Peso devalued to 88 per SDR.
- 4 May 1987: Peso devalued to 650 per USD.

Continued rapid inflation had eroded the value of the peso. By 1996, the exchange rate had reached 225 pesos per Portuguese escudo.

The adoption of the CFA Franc in 1997 created a steep inflation, which in turn contributed to the social unrest that led to the 1998 coup.

== Coins ==
Coins were issued in denominations of 50 centavos, 1, 2 1/2, 5 and 20 pesos.

== Banknotes ==
Banknotes in denominations of 50, 100, and 500 pesos dated 24-9-1975 (24 September 1975) were issued on 2 March 1976. 1000 peso notes were introduced in 1978, followed by 5000 pesos notes in 1984 and 10,000 pesos notes in 1990.

Current Series
Image		Value	Main Colour	Description	
Obverse	Reverse	Value	Main Colour	Obverse	Reverse
		50 pesos	Reddish-purple	Pansau Na Isna	Villagers
		100 pesos	Khaki	Domingos Ramos	Central Bank building in Bissau
		500 pesos	Blue	Francisco Mendes	Slavery
		1000 pesos	Brown	Amílcar Cabral	"Apoteose ao Triunfo"
		5000 pesos	Purple and brown	Amílcar Cabral	Fieldwork
		10,000 pesos	Green	Amílcar Cabral	Fishermen

== See also ==
- Economy of Guinea-Bissau

Guinea-Bissau peso
Preceded by: Portuguese Guinean escudo Reason: independence Ratio: at par	Currency of Guinea-Bissau; 1975 – 1997	Succeeded by: West African CFA franc Reason: joining currency union and inflation Ratio: 1 franc = 65 pesos
