= Mining industry of Guinea-Bissau =

Mining in Guinea-Bissau is limited to small-scale production of construction materials, such as clays, granite, limestone, and sand and gravel. The country's prospective minerals include bauxite, diamond, gold, heavy minerals, petroleum, and phosphate rock.

== Phosphate ==
Phosphate deposits were identified about 40 years ago in the region of Farim. Feasibility studies were completed in the 1980s, but since then no company has been able to begin exploitation. The Farim phosphate rock deposit had estimated resources of more than 166 Mt at a grade of 29% P_{4}O_{10}.

Red Back Mining Inc. through its subsidiary Champion Industrial Minerals (CIM) held a mining lease and after completing a technical and market evaluation in 2003, the company concluded that the project had advanced to a stage where it required a level of developmental, operational, and marketing expertise that was beyond CIM's capacity; since that time, the company has attempted to either locate a suitable partner to develop the Farim deposit or to sell it. Over the past 10 years, licences changed hands between companies for reasons similar to those advanced by CIM, i.e. technical inability to perform required work. More recently, the licence has been held by GB Minerals which signed in 2009 a production agreement with the Guinea-Bissau government.

== Bauxite ==
Bauxite deposits have been identified near the city of Boé since the 1950s. At the time they were never commercially viable due to low world prices. As the economic prospects have become more enticing in the past decaden a lease was granted to a firm named Bauxite Angola in 2007, which has recently made announcements of investments of up to US$500 million.
