= Guinea-Bissau Television =

State television of Guinea-Bissau

Coordinates: 11.8758°N 15.5942°W

- Type: television station
- Branding: Televisão da Guiné-Bissau
- Country: Guinea-Bissau
- Availability: National
- Owner: Government of Guinea-Bissau

Guinea-Bissau Television (Portuguese: Televisão da Guiné-Bissau, or TGB) is the state television of the African country of Guinea-Bissau. The headquarters are in the capital city of Bissau. The station's main transmitter is located in Nhacra and covers the Bissau metropolitan area. The system also includes two relay towers, one in the east of the country, in Gabu, and another in the south, in Catió.

== History ==
The installation of the very first television network in Guinea-Bissau began in the 1980s following a public tender won by a Portuguese company. The first broadcasting service went on air in several experimental stages in October 1987, when the initial contract to create a state television was signed. Out of the three tenders (the other two were French and Cuban), the Portuguese one was selected.

The Portuguese plan was seen as the most complete. It envisioned national coverage, in a two-phase period, with the first phase given to technical training (including the installation of solar-powered television sets in areas without electricity) and the second phase oversaw the creation of a community network and infrastructure for 300 television sets, which ultimately was never achieved.

The television was officially launched in November 1989, under the name Televisão Experimental da Guiné-Bissau (TEGB), through the partnership agreement with Portuguese Radiotelevision (since renamed Rádio e Televisão de Portugal, or RTP). At the time, the country was ruled by João Bernardo Vieira who had seized power in a military coup in 1980, and the day chosen for the official launch coincided with the 9th anniversary of the coup, on 14 November 1989. Until then, Guinea-Bissau only had a radio broadcasting service.

The daily schedule lasted for four-and-a-half hours and programming content was divided between 50% local and 50% foreign. Due to limitations in the programming offer, telenovelas from Brazil and Portugal became the primary items of the schedule. At the beginning of the service, the news was limited to a nightly bulletin at 9pm, which had local news sourced from the Guinean-Bissau information services and international reports obtained from RTP news bulletins. The Portuguese adaptation of Sesame Street was also broadcast. Later on, more programs were being added, such as programs about road safety, content from the Transtel catalog and a newsmagazine made primarily from visits of the president at home or abroad.

The building was formally inaugurated in the second half of 1990. The channel's first broadcast was an interview between Cavaco Silva and Nino Vieira. The channel was also given the right to broadcast the 1990 FIFA World Cup.

In 1995 the broadcasting service was renamed Rádio e Televisão da Guiné-Bissau (RTGB). During the 1998–99 civil war the station survived, but after the fall of Vieira in 1999, the station began to experience difficulties, mainly financial, and was largely ignored by the new political leaders. In 2003 the station was renamed once again, becoming Televisão da Guiné-Bissau (TGB) with the radio section split into a separate company called Radiodifusão Nacional da Guiné-Bissau (RNGB).

In 2006, TGB, in partnership with the Guinean government, acquired the rights to broadcast 64 matches of the 2006 FIFA World Cup held in Germany. It was the first time in the history of the country's television that a Bissau-Guinean media company acquired the rights to broadcast a football world championship, and it was the first World Cup to feature three Portuguese-speaking national teams: Angola, Brazil and Portugal. TGB reportedly paid US$16,000 (€12,300) for the broadcasting rights.

Until 2006, the station traditionally aired only four hours of programming every day, from 6 pm until 10 pm. On 15 November 2006, a day after its 17th anniversary, the channel moved to a twelve-hour schedule, moving the start of daily broadcast to 10 am.

On April 12, 2011, following another coup, the director of TGB was replaced by journalist Francelino Cunha.

In 2014, the channel launched on satellite television operator Canal+ Afrique, encrypted. On October 1, 2021, however, its signal became free-to-air, enabling parts of the diaspora to have direct access to the channel. The channel was also gearing up for its conversion from analog to digital television, as TGB was the last to do so.

A partnership with UNICEF was signed on September 12, 2018, worth CFA 17 million. Alongside the transaction, a camera was donated to TGB.

TGB was occupied by the military on December 4, 2023. At around 2pm, with its signal suspended, its director left the facilities. The channel was only broadcasting music. Regular broadcasts resumed the following day.

== Criticism, controversies and strikes ==
Since its beginning, TGB has been plagued by censorship. The appearance of a new directorate in February 2017 reduced such conditions. In September 2017, a group of staff petitioned to the government a plan to end censorship, due to criticism of its news production.

On March 20, 2006, TGB staff initiated a three-day strike, to reclaim fifteen months of unpaid salaries, as well as CFA 43 million relative to subsidies from the 1999 election. TGB could not afford the means to carry the Casamance conflict, at the time in one of its highest points, due to the lack of a reporting van. On August 6, 2018, TGB's staff, as well as of other media outlets, began a five-day strike period.

== See also ==
- Media of Guinea-Bissau
- National Broadcasting of Guinea-Bissau
