= Telephone numbers in Guinea-Bissau =

Telephone numbers in Guinea-Bissau use the country calling code +245 and have nine-digit national numbers. The international call prefix is 00, and there is no domestic trunk prefix; calls within Guinea-Bissau are made by dialing the full nine-digit number, while calls from abroad use +245 followed by that number. Fixed-line geographic number ranges are allocated to Guiné Telecom, while mobile ranges are allocated to Orange Bissau, Spacetel Guiné-Bissau, and Guinétel.

== Dialing codes and prefixes ==
Country Code: +245
International Call Prefix: 00
Trunk Prefix: none

== Calling formats ==
To call from within Guinea-Bissau, use the full nine-digit number. For calls from outside Guinea-Bissau, prepend +245 to the nine-digit number.

== List of area codes and mobile operators in Guinea-Bissau ==
Phone Number Range	Geographic Area / Type	Operator
+245 44 30X XXXX	Bissau	Guiné Telecom
+245 44 31X XXXX	Bissau	Guiné Telecom
+245 44 320 XXXX	Bissau	Guiné Telecom
+245 44 321 XXXX	Bissau	Guiné Telecom
+245 44 322 XXXX	Santa Luzia	Guiné Telecom
+245 44 325 XXXX	Brá	Guiné Telecom
+245 44 331 XXXX	Mansoa	Guiné Telecom
+245 44 332 XXXX	Bissorã	Guiné Telecom
+245 44 334 XXXX	Manssabá	Guiné Telecom
+245 44 335 XXXX	Farim	Guiné Telecom
+245 44 341 XXXX	Bafatá	Guiné Telecom
+245 44 342 XXXX	Bambadinca	Guiné Telecom
+245 44 351 XXXX	Gabú	Guiné Telecom
+245 44 352 XXXX	Sonaco	Guiné Telecom
+245 44 353 XXXX	Pirada	Guiné Telecom
+245 44 354 XXXX	Pitche	Guiné Telecom
+245 44 370 XXXX	Buba	Guiné Telecom
+245 44 391 XXXX	Canchungo	Guiné Telecom
+245 44 392 XXXX	Cacheu	Guiné Telecom
+245 44 393 XXXX	São Domingos	Guiné Telecom
+245 44 394 XXXX	Bula	Guiné Telecom
+245 44 396 XXXX	Ingoré	Guiné Telecom
+245 44 397 XXXX	Bigene	Guiné Telecom
+245 950 XXX XXX	Mobile GSM	Orange Bissau
+245 951 XXX XXX	Mobile GSM	Orange Bissau
+245 952 XXX XXX	Mobile GSM	Orange Bissau
+245 953 XXX XXX	Mobile GSM	Orange Bissau
+245 954 XXX XXX	Mobile GSM	Orange Bissau
+245 955 XXX XXX	Mobile GSM	Orange Bissau
+245 956 XXX XXX	Mobile GSM	Orange Bissau
+245 957 XXX XXX	Mobile GSM	Orange Bissau
+245 958 XXX XXX	Mobile GSM	Orange Bissau
+245 959 XXX XXX	Mobile GSM	Orange Bissau
+245 960 XXX XXX	Mobile GSM	Spacetel Guiné-Bissau
+245 961 XXX XXX	Mobile GSM	Spacetel Guiné-Bissau
+245 962 XXX XXX	Mobile GSM	Spacetel Guiné-Bissau
+245 963 XXX XXX	Mobile GSM	Spacetel Guiné-Bissau
+245 964 XXX XXX	Mobile GSM	Spacetel Guiné-Bissau
+245 965 XXX XXX	Mobile GSM	Spacetel Guiné-Bissau
+245 966 XXX XXX	Mobile GSM	Spacetel Guiné-Bissau
+245 967 XXX XXX	Mobile GSM	Spacetel Guiné-Bissau
+245 968 XXX XXX	Mobile GSM	Spacetel Guiné-Bissau
+245 969 XXX XXX	Mobile GSM	Spacetel Guiné-Bissau
+245 977 0XX XXX	Mobile GSM	Guinétel
+245 977 1XX XXX	Mobile GSM	Guinétel
+245 977 2XX XXX	Mobile GSM	Guinétel
+245 977 3XX XXX	Mobile GSM	Guinétel
+245 977 4XX XXX	Mobile GSM	Guinétel
+245 977 5XX XXX	Mobile GSM	Guinétel
+245 977 6XX XXX	Mobile GSM	Guinétel
+245 977 7XX XXX	Mobile GSM	Guinétel
+245 977 8XX XXX	Mobile GSM	Guinétel
+245 977 9XX XXX	Mobile GSM	Guinétel
