= Mankanya people =

Ethnic group of the Senegambian region and Guinea

The Mankanya people (Portuguese: Mancanha; French: Mancagne; self-designed as Ba-hula) are an ethnic group native to West Africa, more precisely the Senegambian region and Guinea. They make up a notable ethnic group in the countries of the region, namely Senegal, The Gambia and Guinea-Bissau. Their religion is predominantly Roman Catholic, yet keep a strong tradition of animism. They speak Mankanya, a language belonging to the Bak group (Niger–Congo). They are also known as Bola, Brame, Mancagne, Mancanha, Mankagne, and Mankaya.
