= Papel language =

Bak language of Guinea-Bissau

Papel
- Oyum
- Native to: Guinea-Bissau, Senegal
- Ethnicity: Papel
- Native speakers: 160,000 (2022)
- Language family: Niger–Congo?: Atlantic–Congo; Senegambian; Bak; Manjaku–Papel; Papel
- Dialects: Bolau; Botor; Bojimza; Bosafim; Bonzula; Bontin; Bomzum; Bowoar; Borawis; Bosez; Bopuul; Bosalnka; Bojaal
- Writing system: Latin

Language codes
- ISO 639-3: pbo
- Glottolog: pape1239

Papel (Pepel, Papei), or Oium (Moium), is a Bak language of Guinea-Bissau.

Papel is the language spoken by the Papel people, who live in the central coastal regions of Guinea-Bissau, namely the Biombo Region where it is spoken by 136,000 Bissau-Guineans. Papel speakers are estimated to be around 140,000 in total globally.

Papel has 79,000 speakers living on Bissau Island (called (b)uhlawʔ or (b)usawʔ in Papel). Dialects include Biombo (Papel: uyomʔ) in the southwest and Safim (Papel: safli) in the northeast.

== Classification ==
Papel is part of the Bak language family based in the Senegal/Guinea-Bissau region, thus it is linguistically similar to the Mankanya and Mandjak languages, members of the 'Papel languages' a language sub-family. Today, Papel, along with its linguistic neighbours uses Latin-based script.

- - Bak proper
    - Balanta
    - - Jola languages (Diola)
      - Papel languages
  - Bijago
