= Mankanya language =

Bak language of Guinea-Bissau, Senegal and The Gambia

Mankanya
- Mancanha, Mancagne, Mankaañ
- Native to: Senegal, Guinea-Bissau, and the Gambia
- Region: Southwest Senegal coast
- Ethnicity: Mankanya
- Native speakers: 89,000 (2021–2022)
- Language family: Niger–Congo?: Atlantic–Congo; Senegambian; Bak; Manjaku–Papel; Mankanya
- Writing system: Latin

Language codes
- ISO 639-3: knf
- Glottolog: mank1251

The Mankanya language (Portuguese: Mancanha; French: Mancagne) is spoken by approximately 86,000 people in Guinea-Bissau, Senegal and Gambia primarily belonging to the ethnic group of the same name. It belongs to the Bak branch of the Atlantic–Congo language family.

Mancanha is spoken east of the Manjak language area and to the north of Bissau Island. It is also called Brame.

== Sociolinguistic situation ==
The language has status as a national language in Senegal, and an orthography has recently been developed for writing it. Mankanya is known as "Uhula" by the people themselves (the Mankanya people, or "Bahula"). The name 'Mankanya' is thought to have been conferred upon the people and their language by colonialists who mistook the name of their chief at the time of colonisation for the name of the people-group itself.

The language contains many loanwords from Kriol. There is also extensive bilingualism in Mandjak, a closely related language which is largely mutually comprehensible, as well as in other minority languages spoken in the area, such as Mandinka and Jola. Finally, Mankanya speakers in Senegal also know French, and those in Gambia know English.

== Literature ==
There is a translation of the Christian Bible in the Mankanya language, available via the YouVersion app. It includes a spoken recording (audio-bible).

== Phonology ==
Consonants
	Labial	Alveolar	Retroflex	Palatal	Velar
Plosive	p b	t d	ʈ	(c) ɟ	k g
Fricative	f	θ, (s)	ʂ		x
Nasal	m	n		ɲ	ŋ
Approximant	w	r, l		j	

- Every non-nasal consonant besides /s/ and /c/ can be prenasalised, however it is possible to analyse these consonants as nasal-consonant sequences instead of distinct phonemes.
- The phoneme /c/ is very rare, occurring only in ideophones and loanwords.
- The phoneme /s/ is only found in loanwords.
- Speakers born in Dakar tend to pronounce /θ/ as [s].
- /ʈ/ tends to be pronounced as an affricate [ʈʂ] word-finally.

Vowels
	Front	Central	Back
High	i iː		u uː
Near-high			ʊ ʊː
Mid	e eː	ə	o oː
Low		a aː	

- /a/ is in free variation with [ɜ] in closed syllables.

Stress is placed on the first syllable of the root. Mankanya is not tonal.

== Writing system ==
Mankanya uses the Latin alphabet. In Senegal, a decree of 2005 provides for an orthography for Mankanya.

Mankanya Alphabet (Senegal)
A	B	C	D	E	Ë	F	G	H	I	J	K	L	M	N	Ñ	Ŋ	O	P	R	S	Ş	T	Ŧ	Ţ	U	W	Y
a	b	c	d	e	ë	f	g	h	i	j	k	l	m	n	ñ	ŋ	o	p	r	s	ş	t	ŧ	ţ	u	w	y

== Grammar ==
=== Overview ===
The basic clausal structure of Mankanya has subject, verb, object constituent order, with the verb indexing the subject with prefixes agreeing in person, number, and noun class. Some object pronouns attach to the verb as well, but most are expressed as free pronouns or a full noun phrase, and nouns do not have different forms for subject vs object. Noun class agreement via prefixes which also indicate number is widespread, with most modifiers of nouns displaying agreement with the head noun. In addition to argument indexing, verbs are marked for negation, and to indicate a relative clause, and they can inflect for aspect in some contexts, but most marking of tense, aspect, and modality is done via auxiliary verbs, with the lexical verb appearing in a non-agreeing form. Clause chaining is common, in which multiple events with the same subject will only have the first verb take subject agreement, with subsequent verbs taking a fixed serial marker.

=== Noun classes and pronominals ===
Mankanya has a noun class system, with 10 classes. Nouns are prefixed with a morpheme that encodes both noun class and number (singular vs plural). Other elements of the clause, such as modifiers to the noun, and the verb if the noun is the subject, are marked to agree with the class and number of the noun. Some noun classes also display a further distinction between a general plural noun class prefix, and a counted plural prefix which is used if the noun is modified by a numeral. Class 1 is used for all people, with many nouns in it being agentives derived from verbs. Class 8 lacks number distinctions, and some nouns may be converted to class 8 to take on a mass-noun like meaning, like converting plaak "stone" to mlaak "gravel". Class 9 is used for recent loans, words that lack an inherent class like interrogative pronouns (Though the pronoun "who" triggers class 1 agreement), and a root which may occur with many different prefixes to mean "place", which has a very general meaning. Class 10 is singular only and used for diminutives; no nouns are inherently class 10, all in it are derived from nouns of other classes. A small number of nouns, mostly kin terms, can be possessed through the use of a pronominal suffix for certain possessors. There are 1st and 2nd person pronouns of both numbers, as well as pronouns marked for each noun class and number. Pronouns have subject, object, and possessive forms. The second person, first person plural exclusive, and class 1 singular object pronouns, are realised verb suffixes, while the others are independent. Independent object and possessive pronouns are mostly identical.

=== The noun phrase ===
The noun is the first element in noun phrases, being followed by other elements. Inalienable possessors, used mostly when the possessum is a kin term, and terms like "body", or "household" directly follow the head noun, while alienable possessors occur later in the noun phrase, after adjectives and numerals, and are preceded by a genitive particle -i that agrees in noun class and number with the head noun. Adjectives also agree with the head noun, as do lower numerals. Demonstratives follow after these elements and alienable possessors, also agreeing with the head, and display 3 degrees of distance, as well as a fourth form used in narratives. They may co-occur with a discourse anaphoric demonstrative, which does not agree. Demonstratives and adjectives both may head noun phrases, agreeing with an omitted head. Relative clauses occur at the end of the noun phrase, and have two different structures based on whether the noun is the subject of the relative clause or not. Both mark the verb in the relative clause with a "selectional" suffix of the form -uŋ, while subject relative clauses also prenasalise the first consonant of the verb stem, with non-subject relative clauses being preceded by an agreeing genitive particle instead, like an inalienable possessor. There are three prepositions, ji "like/similar to", na "with", and te "until", as well as a set of locatives, locative modifiers, and locative nouns. Locatives precede a noun phrase, distinguishing both two degrees of distance, and a contrast between an "at" vs "in" meaning. They are often accompanied by a locative modifier which occurs after the noun phrase, and display more specific locational meanings. Locative nouns instead function as the head of a noun phrase, being possessed by the noun they relate to, akin to English "the front of the house". Locative phrases are unspecified for directionality, with this being lexically specified by the verb (ie. there is no distinction in the marking on the noun between "to" and "from", instead this information is provided by the verb, as in "go" vs "come"). Proper nouns can serve as locative phrases without locational marking.

=== Verbal morphology ===
Verbs are marked to agree with their subject, either in person/number, or noun class/number, whether expressed by a noun phrase or not. The first person subject marker takes different allomorphs in some situations, notably an allomorph that triggers prenasalisation on the initial consonant of the verb stem in some subordinate clauses. There is a serial prefix a- used for non-first verbs in sequences when the subject remains the same, which replaces the subject prefix. Verbs (and clauses) are marked for negation by prenasalising the initial consonant of the stem, and lengthening the vowel of the subject prefix, along with a distinct intonation, though relative clauses are instead negated with a copula taking the relative clause morphology, along with negative nasalisation, followed by the lexical verb which takes subject agreement. The selectional suffix -uŋ is used in relative clauses, as mentioned previously, as well as structures likely derived from them and triggers irregular allomorphy/fusion with some other suffixes. There are derivational suffixes including a benefactive applicative and reciprocal which are homophonous in the form -ar for most verb roots, being distinguished by context, two causative suffixes, an instrumental applicative, a middle voice suffix which functions like a reflexive when used alone but like a passive when combined with the reciprocal, as well as reduplication which can indicated continuity or completeness, along with recent past with past marked verbs. Inflectional suffixes are not repeated on the reduplicant, while derivational ones are. There is an infinitive prefix that is required in some subordinate clauses, auxiliary constructions, and can function as an action nominal on its own, while a participle suffix can derive nouns or adjectives from verbs.

=== Tense, aspect, and mood ===
Tense, aspect, and mood marked in clauses partially by verb morphology, along with a number of different auxiliary verbs. A perfective vs imperfective distinction is unmarked in neutral sentences, while a prefix k- marks the imperfective in relative, serial, and negated clauses. There is also a completive suffix -i that marks a present resulting state for change of state verbs, such as turning "grow" into "be big". The imperative is marked with a suffix -an/ani, and the verb does not take a subject prefix if the subject is singular. The auxiliary verbs may also function as lexical verbs in other contexts. They take subject agreement prefixes, along with negation or selectional markers, and trigger different morphology on the lexical verb following them. Past tense is expressed with auxiliary bi "come", and the lexical verb is a bare stem; "come" can also be used, to mark the future, though ya "go", and another verb that may be derived from "look for", luŋ, can also be used. Whichever of the three is used in the future construction, the lexical verb is marked with the imperfective and serial prefixes. Other examples include (but are not limited to) auxiliary ji "say" used for the habitual, while hum "still be" or jon "stay" can be used for the persistive, and continuative, respectively; both similar to English "still", the first focusing more on the fact that the event has not ended, while the latter with more focus on the extended duration. The progressive uses the copula wo, followed by the proximal interior locative particle, and the lexical verb takes a nominal prefix. This is similar to the origin of the English continuous, "be at VERB-ing". In terms of modal meanings, the obligative mood uses the copula, followed by the genitive particle, and a lexical verb marked serial imperfective. If the lexical verb is marked with the infinitive instead, it is the epistemic mood. Both can be translated into English as "should", with the former being deontic "they should help out (because it's the right thing to do).", and the latter because of given knowledge "they should help out (I assume, because they said they would).". Auxiliaries can be combined in some cases, the combination of the ingressive, built from do "make/do" - elsewhere meaning "until" - and the past, yield a past "already" meaning, continuing to present if the lexical verb is marked serial imperfective.

=== Structure of the simple clause ===
Basic clausal word order is subject, verb, object. Subjects may be dropped when clear from context, and independent subject pronouns are typically only used for purposes of focus. Ditransitive clauses show no difference in marking between the direct and indirect objects, with the theme most commonly preceding the recipient. The verb ka "have" can be used without a subject to predicate the existence of its object; in this function, its subject prefixed is the class 2 singular u-. A copula verb wo is used to predicate some adjectives, noun phrases, genitive phrases to express possession, and locative phrases. Adjectives may be underlyingly derived from verbs, or a stem unspecified for part of speech, in which case they take the completive suffix when used as a predicate, while nominal derived adjectives do not, and use the copula instead. Adjectives do not agree in person, if their subject is a speech act participant, they agree as though their subject were a class 1 noun. There is a verbless presentative construction, as in "here is X", in which the particle a follows the referent whose existence is predicated. Some sentences mark the verb with the selectional suffix, elsewhere seen in relative clauses. This is akin to a cleft construction like English "The dog is what I saw", but this construction doesn't use the copula. This construction allows the object to precede the subject and verb. It is commonly used with content interrogative words, though they may remain in situ. Typically negation on the verb is sufficient to negate the clause, but for selectional suffix main clauses, and verbless clauses, the anaphoric demonstrative mënţ occurs at the start to negate them, without any typical marker of negation seen elsewhere in the language. Typically, the presence of a content interrogative word is sufficient to mark a clause as interrogative, though an optional content interrogative particle ba may occur at the end. Polar interrogatives are marked by the presence of a different final particle i. Imperative clauses are marked by a verbal suffix as mentioned prior.

=== Complex clauses ===
Both independent words, and bound verbal morphology can serve to link clauses together. Relative clauses use both the selectional suffix, along with either prenasalisation of the verb stem, or a preceding genitive particle, depending on whether the head is the subject of the relative clause or not. There are independent words këme "or", hënk "so that", ţiki "because", and bë "but", which appear between two linked clauses. There are also words jibi "like/because", and pa "in order to" that require the added clause to take the selectional prefix or the infinitive prefix, respectively. There are also conditional clause introducing words, wolii and le, meaning either "if" or "when", and an additional counterfactual adverb lah is used if the condition refers to a past event that did not come to be. Chains of serial marked verbs can follow an initial subject marked verbs to indicate multiple actions by the same subject, while a clause initial subject switch marker, kë can occur if the subject changes. In addition to the grammaticalised auxiliaries discussed prior, like the obligative, verbs jun "begin", ţañan "stop", do "make" (to form causatives), me "know", win "see", ŧiink "hear", şal "think", and ji "say", can introduce complement clauses, with either complementisers, or infinitive or serial marking on the verb in the complement clause. The verb ji "say" must be used to introduce a speech complement, sometimes following after other verbs of speech, marked serial. There are adverbial clause introducers te "until", wi "when", and ji "like", or "before".

=== Example sentences ===
Class 3 singular agreement is found on every element in this sentence other than the proper noun possessor, which is linked to its inalienable possessum via the genitive particle.

Ka-toh k-i Naala ka-wo ka-faaŧal
C3S-house C3S-GEN naala C3S-be C3S-white
"Naala's house is white"

A question is formed by the content interrogative hum "how (many)", and the final question particle ba. This sentence uses the copula and the preposition na "with" to express possession.

Na-wo na i-poom hum ba?
2P-be with C3P-bread how QUES
"How many loaves do you(plural) have?"

The first verb is marked imperative through a suffix, and does not index its subject as a result, but following verbs take the standard system of inflection. The auxiliary luŋ marks the future tense, along with serial and imperfective marking on the lexical verb. The lexical verb indexes the second person singular with a suffix, while the class 2 singular object is realised as an independent pronoun.

Naţ-i-in i-ñaay na u-ŧaak bŧi ţiki d-luŋ k-a-wul-u w-a.
stand-MID-IMP 2S-walk.about with C2S-country all because 1S-FUT IMPERF-SER-give-2S.OBJ C2S-OBJ
"Get up and walk about all this land, because I will give you it."

The independent possessive pronoun naan "mine" is used without an intervening genitive particle for an inalienable possessive relation. The verb root bi "come" is here derived with the benefactive suffix, resulting in a transitive verb "come to", which here takes a suffix indexing the first-person singular object.

Ba-ŧënţ naan ba-tëb ba-bi-ir-ën p-ñooţ b-ŧuh.
C1P-peer 1S.GEN C1P-two C1P-come-BEN-1S.OBJ INF-take C5S-fishing
"Two of my peers came to me to take me fishing"

Kë introduces a complement clause of perception, which uses the auxiliary bi "come", and a bare following verb, in this case hil "can/be able", which itself takes an infinitive complement to express ability.

Ŋ-win bnuura kë ba-am-bi hil p-neej d-u d-ko.
1P-see well COMP C1P-NEG-PAST be.able INF-enter EXT-LOC.DIST C9S-place
"We saw clearly that they had not been able to enter the place."

A relative clause, in which the subject of the relative clause is the shared argument, is formed by prenasalising the initial consonant of the verb stem, and adding the selectional suffix -uŋ.

D-win na-lët a-m-boman-uŋ b-laañ.
1S-see C1S-tailor C1S-COREF-make-SEL C5S-wrap
"I saw the tailor who made the dress."

Here the relative clause is formed with the selectional suffix, but with a genitive morpheme linking it to the head noun instead of the co-reference prenasalisation, as the shared argument is not the subject of the relative clause. This also shows the use of the auxiliary bi "come", to mark the future tense.

A-ŋal i-ko y-i ba-k-bi-iŋ k-a-nug.
C1S-like C3P-thing C3P-GEN C1P-IMPERF-FUT-SEL IMPERF-SER-buy
"She likes the things that they are going to buy."

Wi "when" is originally from the class 2 singular genitive morpheme, with an omitted head noun wal "time", so the clause it introduces is relativised, as can be seen by the verb taking the selectional suffix. Du is a locative, in the distal exterior form. The verb "find" is negated by lengthening the vowel of the prefix, and prenasalising the first consonant of the root. The class 9 singular object here means "there".

Wi Dama a-kak-uŋ d-u b-her a-an-ţënk d-a Şompi
when dama C1S-return-SEL EXT-LOC.DIST C5S-hole SER-NEG-find C9S-OBJ şompi
"When Dama returned to the hole, she didn't find Shompi there."
