= Portuguese Guinea =

1588–1974 Portuguese colony in West Africa

Coordinates: 2°11′N 102°23′E

Overseas Province of Guinea Província Portuguesa da Guiné (Portuguese)
- 1588–1974
- Flag (1910–1974) Coat of arms (1951–1974)
- Anthem: "Hymno Patriótico" (1808–26); Patriotic Anthem "Hino da Carta" (1826–1911); Hymn of the Charter "A Portuguesa" (1911–74); The Portuguese
- Status: Dependency of Portuguese Cape Verde (1588–1879); Colony of the Portuguese Empire (1879–1951); Overseas Province of Portugal (1951–1973); State of the Portuguese Empire (1973–1974)
- Capital: Bolama (1852–1942); Bissau (1942–1974)
- Common languages: Portuguese (official); Guinea-Bissau Creole; Balanta; Fula; Mandjak; Mandinka; Papel
- Monarch
  - 1588–1598: Philip I of Portugal
  - 1908–1910: Manuel II of Portugal
- President
  - 1910–1915: Teófilo Braga
  - 1974: António de Spínola
- Governor
  - 1615–1619 (first): Baltasar Pereira de Castelo Branco
  - 1974 (last): Carlos Fabião
- Historical era: Imperialism
  - Founding of Cacheu: 1588
  - Independence of Guinea-Bissau: 10 September 1974
- Currency: Portuguese real (1588–1909); Portuguese Guinean real (1909–1914); Portuguese Guinean escudo (1914–1975)
- ISO 3166 code: GN
Preceded by	Succeeded by
Kaabu; British Guinea	Liberated Zones (Guinea-Bissau)
- Today part of: Guinea-Bissau

Portuguese Guinea (Portuguese: Guiné Portuguesa), called the Overseas Province of Guinea from 1951 until 1972 and then State of Guinea from 1972 until 1974, was a Portuguese overseas province in West Africa from 1588 until 10 September 1974, when it gained independence as Guinea-Bissau.

== Early Portuguese period ==
Flag of the Casa da Guiné, a Portuguese company that traded in several commodities, including slaves, around the Guinea coast beginning in the 15th century

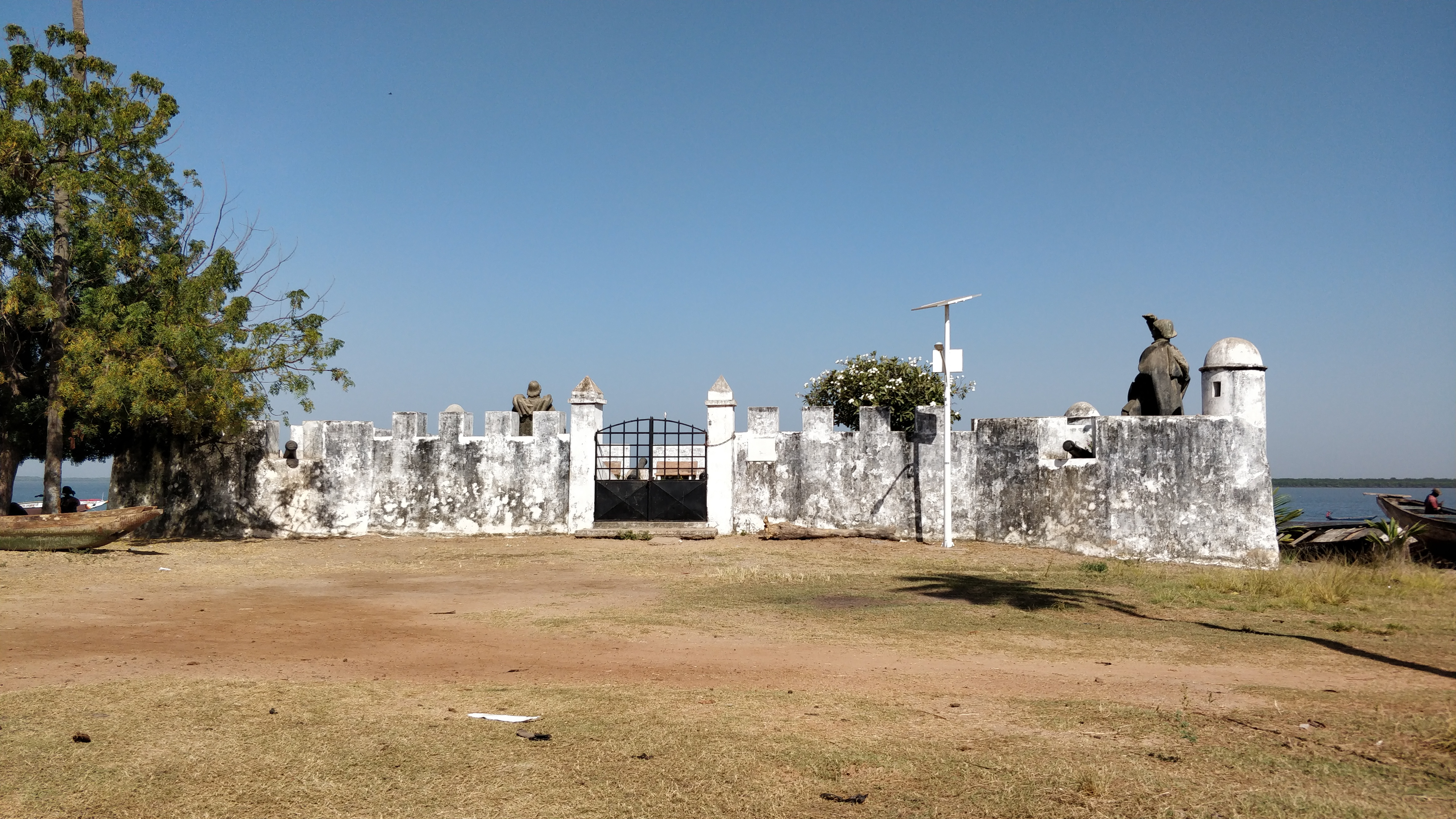
Cacheu Fort

The Portuguese Crown commissioned its navigators to explore the Atlantic coast of West Africa in the 1430s, to find sources of gold. At that time the gold trade was controlled by Morocco. Muslim caravans across the Sahara also carried salt, kola, textiles, fish, grain, and slaves. The navigators first passed the obstruction of Cape Bojador in 1437 and were able to explore the West African coast as far as Sierra Leone by 1460 and colonize the Cape Verde islands beginning in 1456.

The gold ultimately came from the upper reaches of the Niger and Volta Rivers and the Portuguese crown wanted to divert the gold trade to the coast. To control the gold trade, the Portuguese king ordered a castle built, called São Jorge da Mina (now Elmina Castle), on the Portuguese Gold Coast in 1482 along with other trading posts. The Portuguese government founded the Company of Guinea to trade and set the prices of goods, including gold and ivory, Melegueta pepper and slaves. The Atlantic slave trade transported an estimated eleven million people from Africa between 1440 and 1870, including two million from Senegambia and Upper Guinea.

This area was the source of an estimated 150,000 African slaves transported by the Portuguese before 1500, mainly from Upper Guinea. Some were used to grow cotton and indigo in the previously uninhabited Cape Verde islands. Portuguese traders and exiled criminals penetrated the rivers and creeks of Upper Guinea, forming a mulatto population speaking a Portuguese-based Creole language as a lingua franca. However, after 1500 most Portuguese interest, both for gold and slaves, centered further south in the Gold Coast.

At the beginning of the 17th century, the Portuguese exported slaves from Upper Guinea from Santiago in Cape Verde, and those from the Gulf of Guinea from São Tomé Island. In the 1630s and 1640s, the Dutch drove the Portuguese from most of the Gold Coast. The Portuguese did retain a foothold at São João de Ajuda in Benin, now called Ouidah, since before the 1750s they preferred to acquire slaves from the Gulf of Guinea rather than Upper Guinea. In the 17th century, the French established bases at Saint-Louis, Senegal, the English at Kunta Kinteh Island on the Gambia River and Dutch at Gorée.

The very weak Portuguese position in Upper Guinea was strengthened by the first Marquess of Pombal who promoted the supply of slaves from this area to the provinces of Grão-Pará and Maranhão in northern Brazil. Between 1757 and 1777, over 25,000 slaves were transported from the “Rivers of Guinea”, which approximated Portuguese Guinea and parts of Senegal, even though this area had been largely neglected by the Portuguese for the previous 200 years. Bissau, founded in 1687 and re-established as a fortified post in the mid-18th century, became the centre of Portuguese control.

British interest in the area led to a brief attempt in the 1790s to establish a base on the island of Bolama, which showed no evidence of continuous Portuguese presence. The British settlers pulled back in 1793 and the Portuguese officially occupied the island in 1837. Even after the Portuguese claim in 1837, Afro-Portuguese lived and worked there alongside Afro-British from Sierra Leone, since Britain did not relinquish its claim to Bolama until 1870.

The abolition of the slave trade by Britain in 1807 gave the slave traders of Guinea a virtual monopoly over the West Africa slave trade with Brazil. Although the Brazilian and Portuguese governments agreed in the 1830s to stop this traffic, it probably continued at 18th-century levels until after 1850, when the British pressured Brazil to enforce its existing ban on the import of slaves. The last significant consignment of West African slaves reached Brazil in 1852.

== Later colonial period ==
Britain's interest in the Upper Guinea region declined with the end of the British slave trade in 1807 and became focused on Sierra Leone after the Boloma Island settlement was abandoned. At the start of the 19th century, the Portuguese felt reasonably secure in Bissau and regarded the neighboring coastline as their own. Their control was tenuous: for much of the 19th century the Portuguese presence in Guinea was mainly limited to the rivers of Guinea, the settlements of Bissau, Cacheu and Ziguinchor (the last now in Senegal). Elsewhere it was preserved, with little official assistance, by local Creole people and Cape Verde islanders, who owned small plantations.

The existence of plantations run by the French and Senegalese brought a risk of French claims south of the Casamance River. After the Berlin Conference of 1885 introduced the principle of effective occupation, negotiations with France led to the loss of the valuable Casamance region to French West Africa. In exchange, the French agreed to Portuguese Guinea's boundaries.

Portugal occupied half a dozen coastal or river bases, controlling some maritime trade, but not much of the population. However, in 1892, Portugal made Guinea a separate military district, to promote its occupation. The Portuguese abandoned their policy of trade and neutrality and became militarily involved in the region, as part of the Portuguese campaigns of pacification and occupation. The years between 1879 and 1891 were marked by riverine and amphibious operations against hostile coastal kingdoms. All the Muslim Fula kingdoms in the interior recognized Portuguese sovereignty over the territory in 1892 in exchange for autonomous rule, and from there on the Portuguese were able to recruit great numbers of Muslim auxiliaries to annex the remaining polities in the interior, who were animistic.

Had the doctrine of effective occupation been as prominent in 1870 as after 1884, Portugal might also have lost Bolama to Britain. However, Britain and Portugal agreed in 1868 to international arbitration. President Ulysses S. Grant of the United States of America acted as arbiter, and in 1870 awarded the island to Portugal.

Portugal's precarious financial position and military weakness threatened its ability to retain its colonies. In 1891, António José Enes, Minister of Marine and Colonies, rationalized taxes and granted concessions in Guinea, mainly to foreign companies, to increase its exports. The increased revenue was intended to fund a gradual expansion of control that would give Portugal tax revenue from trade and the indigenous people. The modest increase in government income between 1895 and 1910 did not cover the cost of the troops used to impose the taxes, however. Enes' policies largely failed; resistance continued in the interior, on the islands, and at the coast. However, once military occupation had begun, Portugal persisted, hoping for future benefits.

After the Portuguese monarchy fell in 1910, the new republic set up a ministry for colonial administration. Guinea's income increased as peanut prices rose, tax collection improved and its budget showed a surplus. Between 1913 and 1915, João Teixeira Pinto used native troops to impose Portuguese rule and crush resistance to the hut tax by destroying villages and seizing cattle, causing many to flee to Senegal or into the forests. The cost of maintaining his forces and the resulting budget deficits led to his recall in 1915.

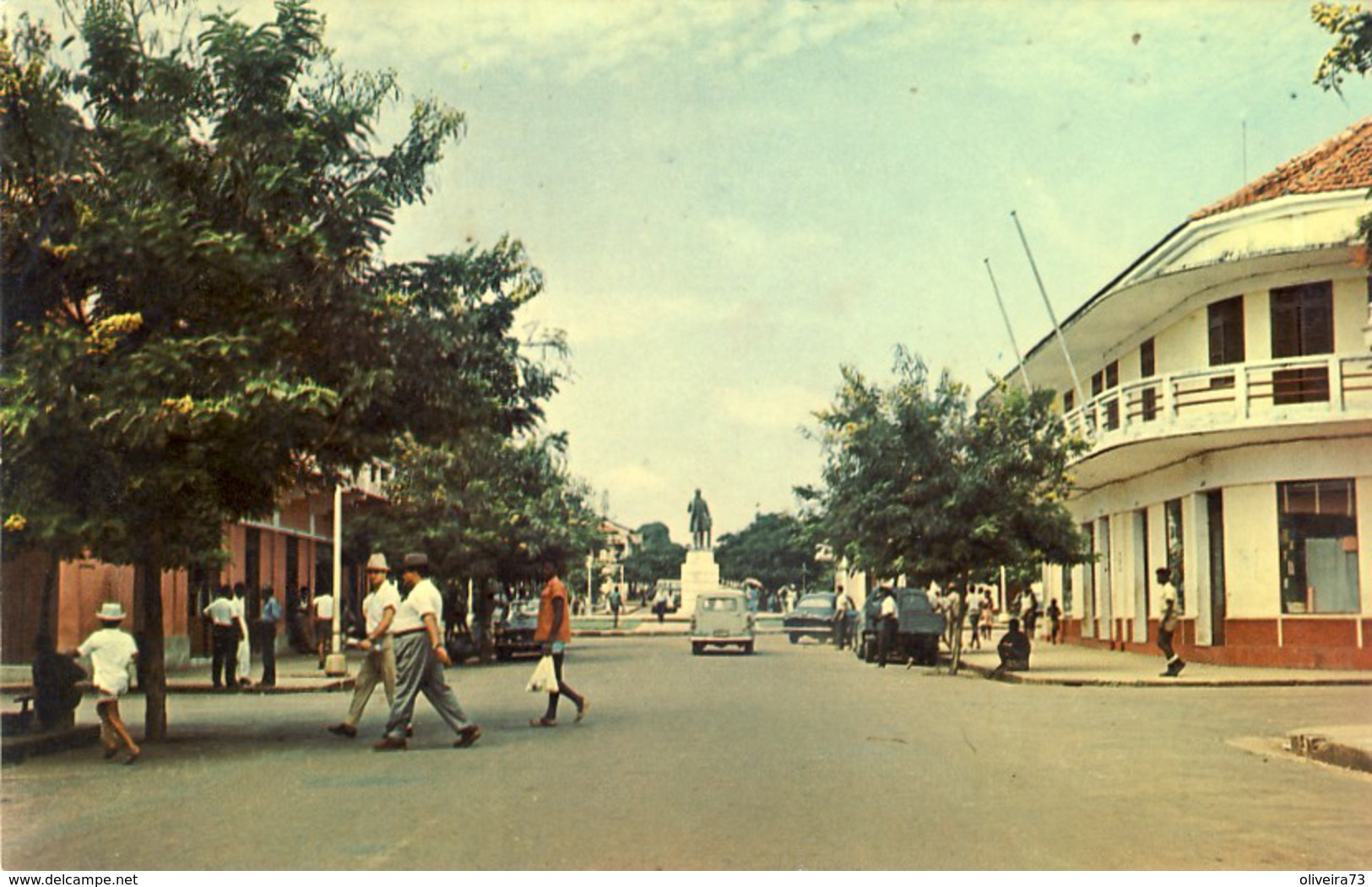
Portuguese Guinea in the 1960s

Although the First World War increased world demand for tropical products and stimulated Guinea's economy, a post-war slump, and frequent political crises created a deep recession. By the 1926 military uprising in Portugal, most of Guinea was occupied, administered, and taxed, but its revenue was not enough to pay for its administration, much less to expand it. When the Estado Novo imposed police on the Bissagos Islands in 1935–36, it completed its control of Guinea.

Between the 1930s and 1960s, the colony was a neglected backwater, whose only economic significance was to supply Portugal with about one-third of its vegetable oil, from peanuts. It was unclear if its population of about 500,000 in 1950 was large enough to grow enough peanuts to pay for its imports and administration, and still grow food for its population. In 1951, because of anti-colonialist criticism in the United Nations, the Portuguese government renamed all of Portugal's colonies, including Portuguese Guinea, as overseas provinces.

Development was largely neglected before the start of the country's independence war. One paternalistic governor, Sarmento Rodrigues, promised to develop agriculture, infrastructure, and health, but did little to fight the upsurge in sleeping sickness in the 1940s and 1950s. Guinea saw little public investment in the first Portuguese Overseas Development Plan (1953–58), and a second plan (1959–64) concentrated on its towns. Adequate rural health clinics were not provided until General Spínola's program of 1968–73. Public education provided was limited: in 1959 Guinea had some 200 primary schools with 13,500 pupils and 36 post-primary schools, mainly for the children of Portuguese citizens and urban assimilados, with 1,300 pupils. These schools were never particularly accessible to native inhabitants, and only around nineteen percent of school-age children attended primary school. Literacy rates suffered, with an estimated 99 percent of the population illiterate in 1950, making Guinea the most illiterate Portuguese territory in Africa.

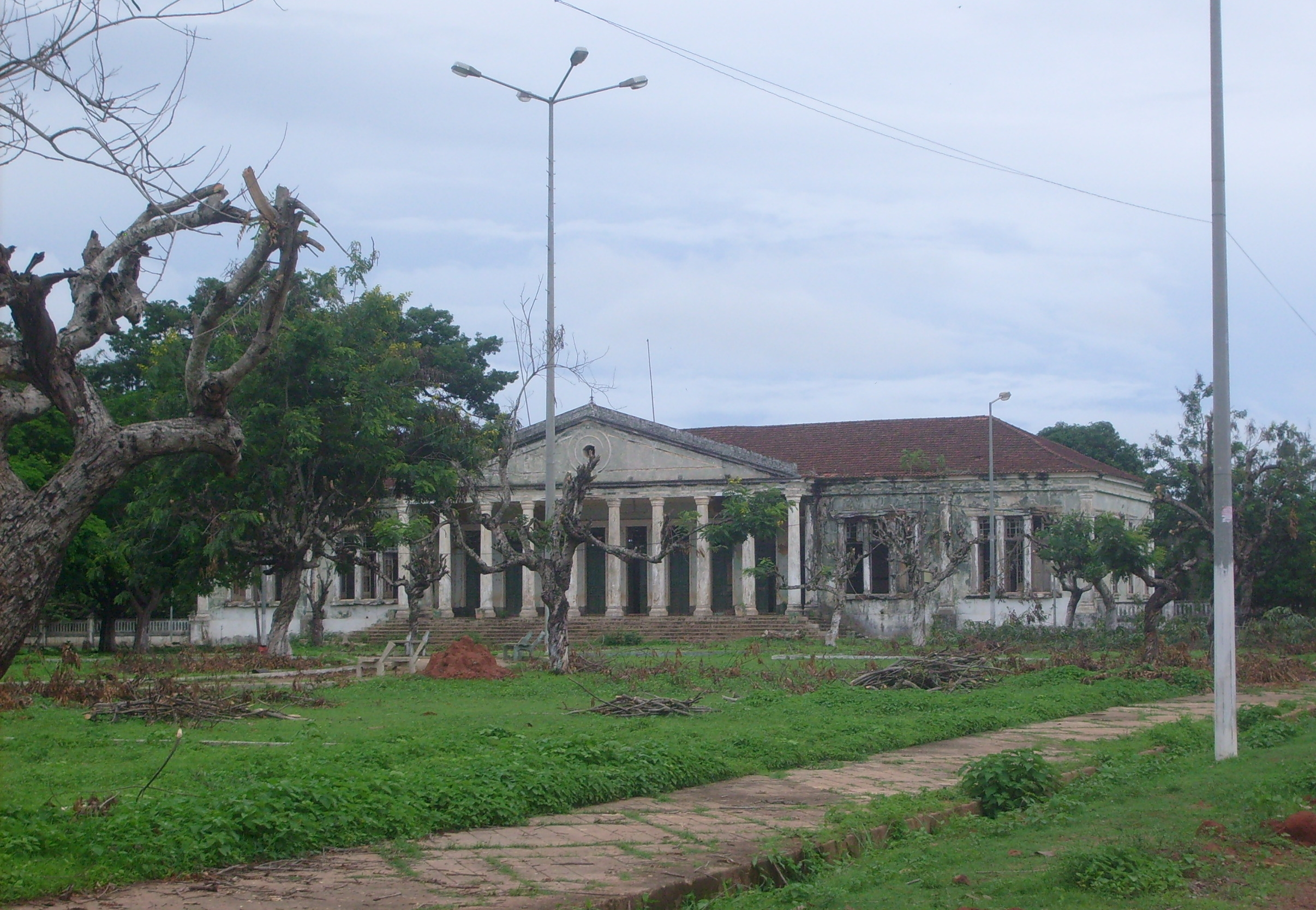
Ruins from the colonial era on Bolama Island (in recovery)

== Independence movement ==
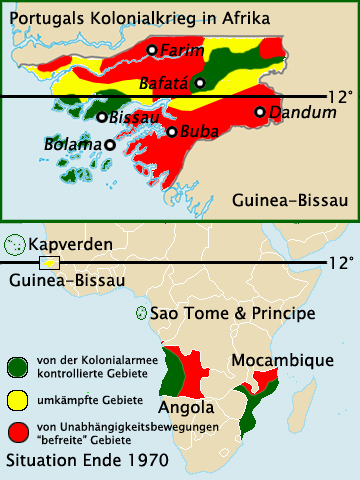
Portuguese-held (green), disputed (yellow) and rebel-held areas (red) in Guinea, 1970

The fight for independence began in 1956, when Amílcar Cabral founded the African Party for the Independence of Guinea and Cape Verde (PAIGC). At first, PAIGC organised a series of strikes by urban workers, especially those working in the port and river transport. But on 3 August 1959, fifty striking dockworkers were killed, and after this, the PAIGC changed strategy, avoiding public demonstrations and concentrating instead on organising the rural peasants. In 1961, after a purely political campaign for independence had made little progress, the PAIGC adopted guerrilla tactics.

While heavily outnumbered by Portuguese troops (approximately 30,000 Portuguese to some 10,000 guerrillas), the PAIGC had safe havens over the border in Senegal and Guinea, both recently independent of French rule. The conflict in Portuguese Guinea between the PAIGC guerrillas and the Portuguese Army was the most intense and damaging of the Portuguese Colonial War, and several communist countries supported the guerrillas with weapons and military training.

In 1972 Cabral set up a government in exile in Conakry, the capital of neighbouring Guinea. He was assassinated there outside his house, on 20 January 1973.

By 1973 the PAIGC controlled most of the interior of the country, while the coastal and estuary towns, including the main population and economic centres remained under Portuguese control. The PAIGC guerrillas declared the independence of Guinea-Bissau on September 24, 1973, in the town of Madina do Boe in the southeasternmost area of the territory, near the border with neighbouring Guinea.

After the Carnation Revolution military coup in Lisbon on 25 April 1974, the new revolutionary leaders of Portugal and the PAIGC signed an accord in Algiers, in which Portugal agreed after a series of diplomatic meetings to remove all troops by the end of October and to officially recognize the government of the Republic of Guinea-Bissau controlled by the PAIGC, on 26 August 1974. Demobilized by the departing Portuguese military authorities after the 1974 Carnation Revolution in Lisbon and the independence of Portuguese Guinea, a total of 7,447 Guinea-Bissauan African soldiers who had served in Portuguese native commando forces and militia were summarily executed by the PAIGC. Marcelino da Mata, a Portuguese Army officer born in Portuguese Guinea, known for bravery and heroism in the Portuguese Colonial War, who had participated in 2412 commando operations and became the most decorated Portuguese military officer in the history of the Portuguese Army, managed to escape this fate only because he was in mainland Portugal for medical care.

== Economy ==
=== Early colonial economy ===
In the 1430s trade from West Africa was controlled by Muslim states on Africa's northern coast. Muslim trade routes across the Sahara, which had existed for centuries, transported salt, kola, textiles, fish, grain, and slaves.

As the Portuguese extended their influence along the coasts of Mauritania, Senegambia by 1445 and Guinea, they created trading posts. Rather than directly competing with the Muslim traders, they increased trade across the Sahara.

Proposed flag for Portuguese Guinea (1932)

There was only a very small market for African slaves as domestic workers in Europe, and as workers on the sugar plantations of the Mediterranean. However, the Portuguese found they could make considerable amounts of gold transporting slaves from one trading post to another along the Atlantic coast of Africa. The Portuguese found Muslim traders entrenched along the African coast as far as the Bight of Benin, and Muslim merchants had a high demand for slaves to serve as porters on the trans-Saharan routes, and to sell in the Islamic Empire.

Proposed flag for Portuguese Guinea (1965)

For most of the period of Portuguese involvement, the people of Portuguese Guinea were subsistence farmers. By the 19th century, the coastal Balanta people, who lived outside Portuguese control, had developed a sophisticated agricultural system, growing paddy-rice in reclaimed coastal swamps. Much of this rice was exported to surrounding territories, particularly after indigenous rice was replaced by imported varieties. The Balanta also participated in the slave trade in this period. Another crop developed in this period was peanuts, and peanut exports from Portuguese Guinea began in the mid-19th century. As intensive plantation cultivation led to reduced soil fertility, peanuts were normally grown by peasants in Portuguese-controlled areas, who mixed them with food crops and maintained fallow periods.

=== Later colonial economy ===
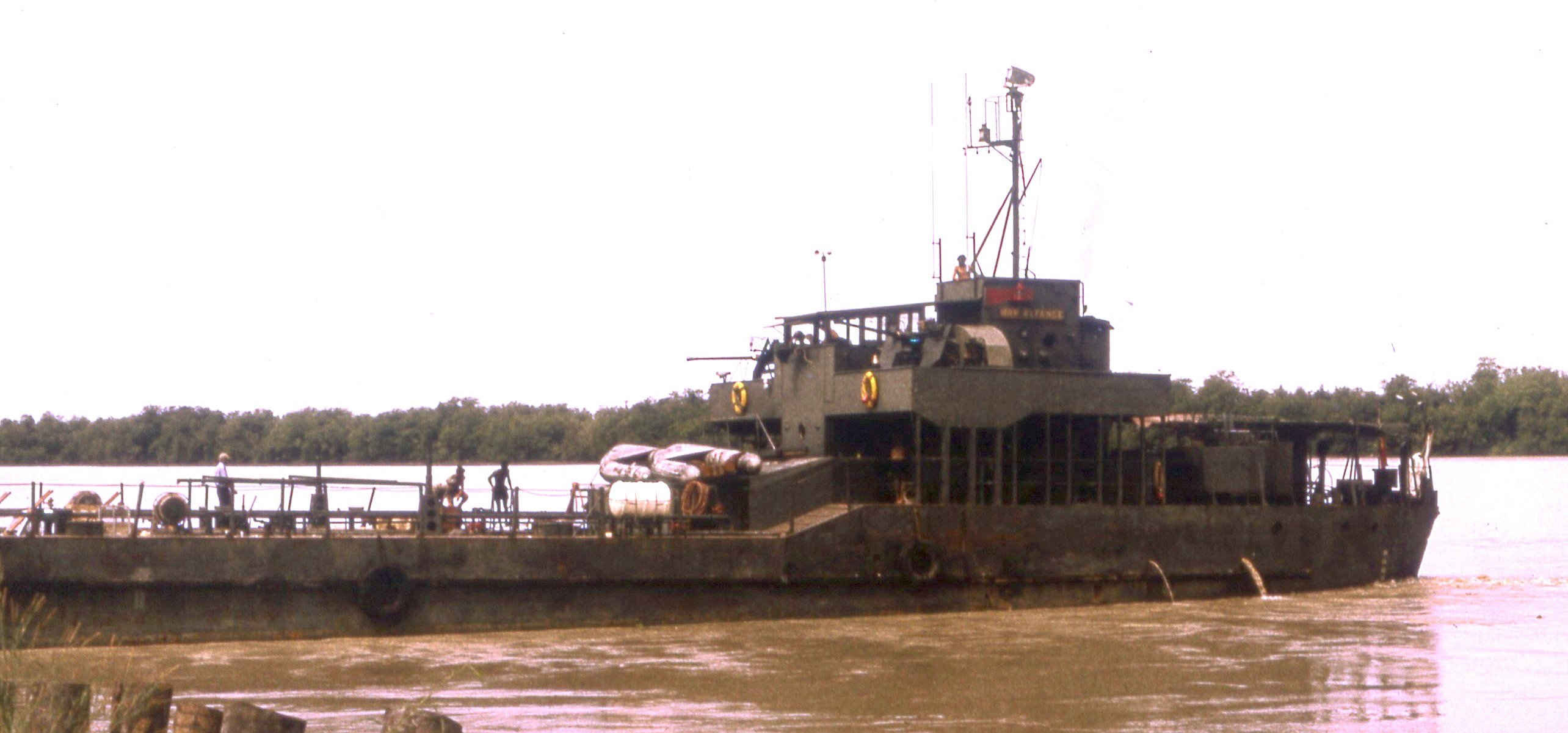
A Portuguese landing craft in Portuguese Guinea, 1973

Before the Estado Novo period, Portugal was weak internationally and stronger powers forced it to adopt free trade policies in its colonies. The Estado Novo replaced free trade with protectionism and state economic intervention. The colonies were to provide Portugal with raw materials, foreign exchange, taxes and labour, and absorb its manufactures and surplus people. Although Guinea produced some rubber at the end of the 19th century, its main exports were vegetable oils and Balanta rice. It had a small domestic market and was unattractive to colonists. Most of its land and people were engaged in food production and it could not generate sufficient exports to support the colonial bureaucracy and the increasing population in Bissau and other towns, nor to promote its peoples’ social welfare.

Peanut exports rose from 5,000 tons in 1910 to 20,000 tons in 1925. Under the Estado Novo exports averaged almost 30,000 tons a year in 1939–45, rising to 35,000 tons between 1946 and 1955, but falling in the next decade because of falling prices. The peanut export trade improved Guinea's balance of payments up to the mid-1950s but had little effect on its peoples’ economic or social welfare, as the Estado Novo granted an import and export trade monopoly to a Portuguese conglomerate, Companhia União Fabril.

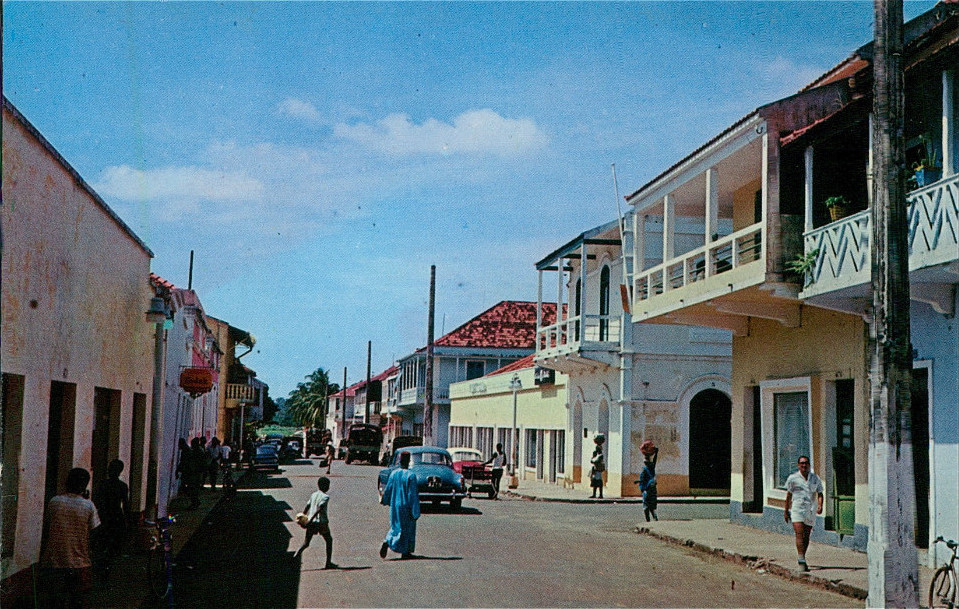
Portuguese Guinea in the 1960s

Until 1942 growers received prices at world levels, but they then declined. Forced labour was rarely used, but Africans were obliged to plant peanuts. However, the Estado Novo lacked sufficient coercive powers to force the peanut production it wanted, if this limited the production of rice for food. The lack of taxable export crops meant that the Portuguese administration remained unable to increase its income or its authority, in a self-limiting cycle.

Low prices for exports and a rapid increase in imports after 1958 led to worsening trade deficits throughout the 1960s. Exports covered 42% of the cost of imports in 1964, but only 20% in 1968. Growing rice for food expanded in the 1950s and 1960s, reducing the land available for cash crops.

Migration of Balanta from northern Guinea to the south to cultivate rice intensified in the 1920s. Balanta rice cultivation greatly increased in the 1930s and 1940s, but the state granted legal title to the pontas to Europeans or Cape Verdeans. These bought rice from the farmers at fixed low prices and exported much of it, so by the 1950s the south of Guinea had a rice shortage.

The decade up to 1973 was dominated by the war. In 1953, some 410,000 hectares were cultivated, but only 250,000 hectares in 1972, and many farmers fled from Guinea or to Bissau and other towns. Reduced food production and the loss of many rice paddies led to widespread malnutrition and disease. An agronomic survey of Guinea by Amílcar Cabral contained a major critique of Estado Novo policies. He was concerned about the emphasis on peanuts, amounting to virtual monoculture, and abandonment of traditional techniques, but he urged state control and collectivisation, not smallholder farming.

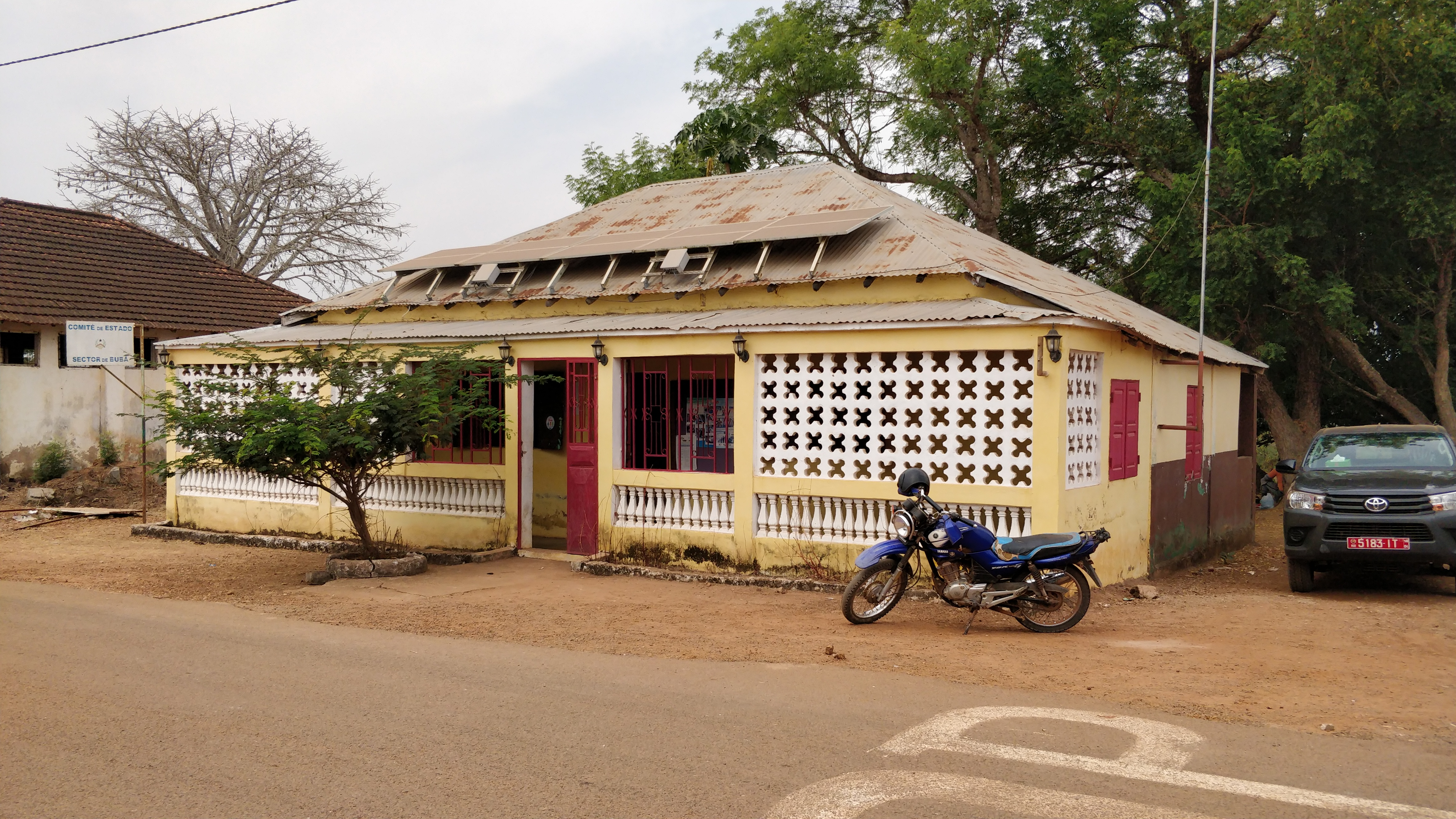
Later Colonial house building in Buba

== See also ==
- List of governors of Portuguese Guinea
- Arquivo Histórico Ultramarino (archives in Lisbon documenting Portuguese Empire, including Guinea)
- Campaigns of Pacification and Occupation
