= British Guinea =

Former british colony

Colony of Bolama and Bolama River
- 1792–1870
- Flag
- Status: Crown colony
- Capital: Bolama
- Common languages: English (official), Biafada
- Religion: Christianity
- Monarch
  - 1792–1820: George III (first)
  - 1837–1870: Victoria (last)
- Governor
  - 1792: Philip Beaver
  - 1868–1870: James Craig Loggie (last)
- Historical era: First wave of European colonization
  - Establishment: 10 May 1792
  - Change of sovereignty: 1 October 1870
Succeeded by
Portuguese Guinea
- Today part of: Guinea-Bissau

British Guinea, or the Colony of Bolama and Bolama River, was a colony of the United Kingdom in West Africa. Its capital was in the city of Bolama.

The colony was founded in 1792, but was incorporated, after arbitration, into Portuguese Guinea in 1870. It comprised the islands adjacent to the island of Bolama, in the Bijagós Archipelago, and the strips of land on the banks of the Buba River.

Its territories are currently components of the independent nation Guinea-Bissau.

== History ==
Guinea was already being gradually explored by the Portuguese from 1490 in Cacheu, from 1615 in Bafatá, from 1641 in Farim and from 1697 in Bissau. In this period, all the lands north of the Geba river were already colonized by Portugal. However, the Portuguese only became interested in the island of Bolama in 1753, and even so they did not start colonization.

=== Beginning of British colonization ===
The Portuguese lack of interest in the island of Bolama and the Bijagós Archipelago opened opportunities for, on 10 May 1792, two British naval officers, Lieutenants Philip Beaver and Henry Dalrymple, to apply for a concession in London to found a model colony on Bolama Island (scarcely inhabited and apparently available for European settlement).

The Bulama Association, a philanthropic and financial organisation, hoped to create a colony that would remove the need for slave plantations in the Caribbean by resettling Black former slaves from the Americas on the island. The expedition, which consisted of two ships and two hundred and seventy-five colonists, set sail from England on 14 April 1792. Philip Beaver, president of the council of the colonization society, was commander of HMS Hankey; Richard Hancorn, vice-president, was commander of HMS Calypso. Most of the settlers died and the survivors abandoned the colony in November 1793. Hancorn died on the island weeks after the other leaders had decided to return home, on 21 July 1792.

After Darlymple gave up, Philip Beaver, on 27 July 1792, bought the ownership rights to Bolama's land, acquiring them from the king of Canhabaque. After the acquisition, he established a village with a population of 275 British, in the region of Ponta Oeste, current village of Bolama de Baixo, becoming the first colonial ruler of British Guinea. On November 29 of the same year he and the 275 Britons left the village. Bolama started to serve as the mooring coast for British ships that sailed between the Gambia and Sierra Leone.

In 1816 Joseph Scott carried out an expedition to try to re-establish the village of Bolama, but he encountered resistance from the Bijagós peoples, who repopulated the island. Commander Scott gave up on colonizing the island and preferred to travel to Sierra Leone.

=== Conflict for possession of Bolama ===
On 24 June 1827 the British colonial governor of Sierra Leone Neil Campbell, in an expedition to the island of Bolama and the Buba River, signed treaties ratifying the possession of Bolama with the kings of Bolola and Guinala. However, in opposition to the British, less than a year later, on 12 July 1828, King Damião, of the Kingdom of Canhabaque, and ambassadors of King Fabião, of the Kingdom of the Beafadas, signed a treaty authorizing the occupation of Bolama by the Portuguese. On 9 May 1830 Joaquim António de Mattos began the Portuguese military occupation of Bolama, the island's first permanent colony. Slave trading factories are built in Bolama. Portuguese colonization and the slave trade generated diplomatic reaction from the British.

Between 1838 and 1859 the British attacked Bolama, Portuguese military posts and slave transport vessels, starting the Bolama Conflict, of a military and diplomatic nature. Some of these attacks managed to briefly occupy the island, sometimes freeing slaves, sometimes imprisoning Portuguese soldiers, in an unprecedented conflict in relations between Portugal and Great Britain, surpassed in diplomatic terms (but not in military escalation) later only by the dispute known as the Rose-Coloured Map.

In February 1859 the British made their last and most destructive attack on the Bolama facility, causing the Portuguese to abandon the island. Thus, on 10 May 1860, the British colonial governor of Sierra Leone proclaims the restoration of British Guinea, but under the administration of the Colony and Protectorate of Sierra Leone. On 3 December 1860 Stephen Hill, governor of Sierra Leone, visits Bolama and establishes a fixed military contingent. On 14 December 1861 the British colony of Bolama was inaugurated.

=== Arbitration and change of sovereignty ===
In 1868 the British government agreed to submit the Bolama question to international arbitration. On 21 April 1870 the dispute was resolved by an arbitration award of the President of the United States, Ulysses Grant, which gave Portugal victory, determining that the British withdraw from the region. The Portuguese representative at the arbitration court was António José de Ávila who, after the victory, was awarded the title of Duke of Ávila and Bolama.

On 1 October 1870 the Bolama transfer of sovereignty ceremony took place, with the lowering of the British flag; then, the Portuguese flag was hoisted in Bolama, symbolizing the end of the conflict.
