= List of cities in Guinea-Bissau =

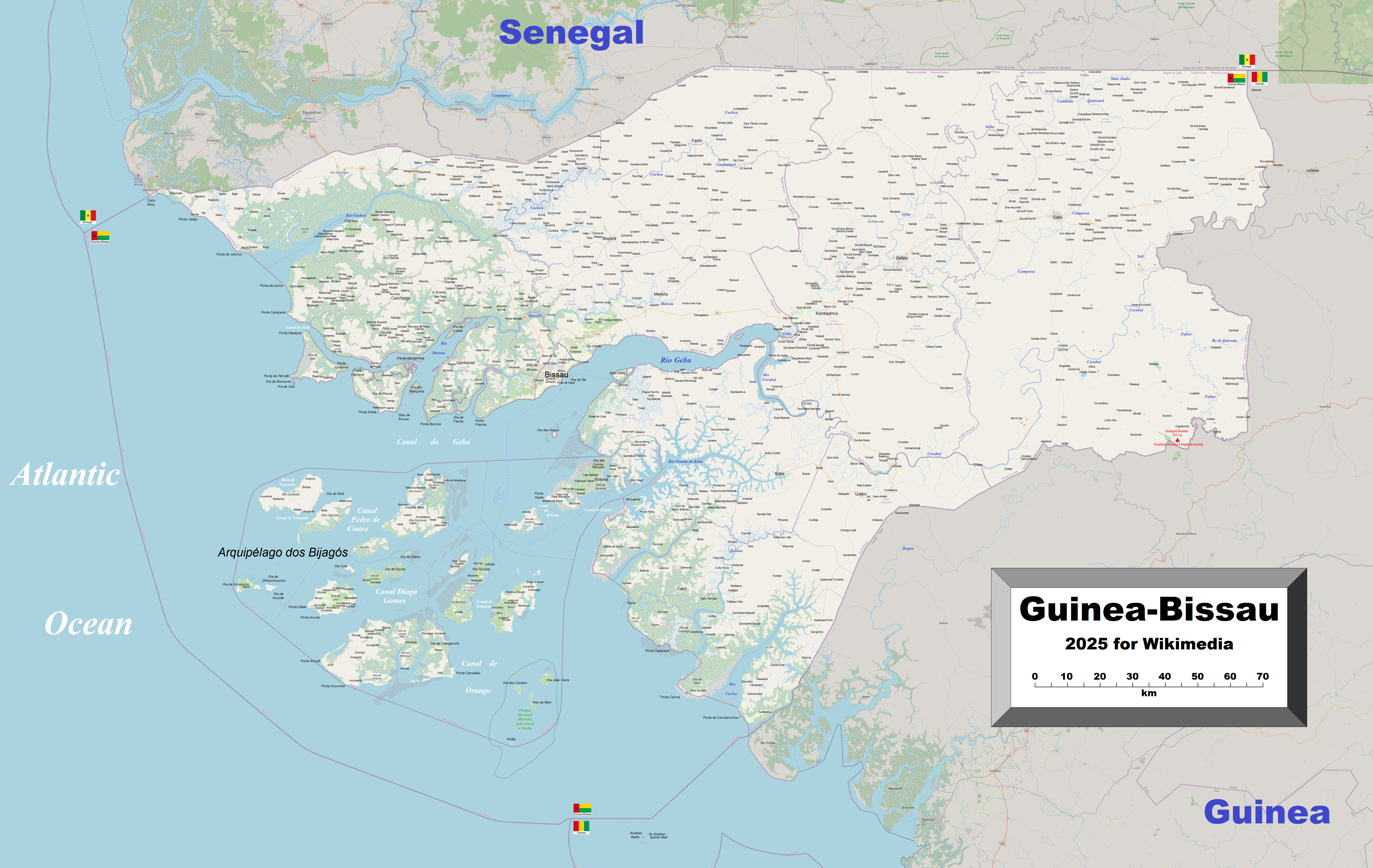
A map of Guinea-Bissau showing all major cities and towns, and many villages.

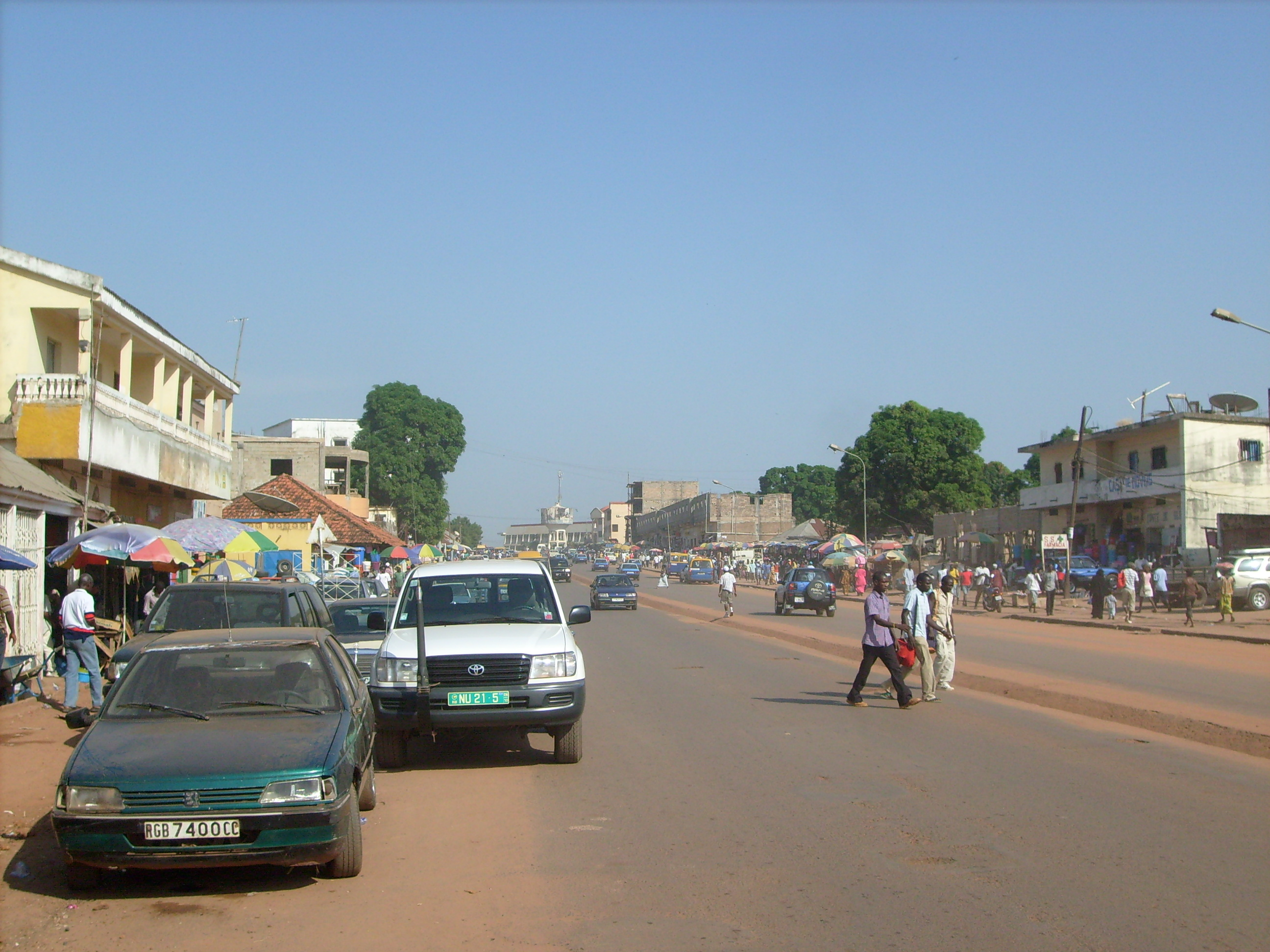
Bissau, the Capital of Guinea-Bissau.

This is a list of cities in Guinea-Bissau order by population. All settlements with a population of over 5,000 are included.

== Cities ==
Cities in Guinea-Bissau
| Rank | City | Population (2009 census) | Region |
|---|---|---|---|
| 1 | Bissau | 387,909 | Bissau |
| 2 | Gabú | 43,556 | Gabú |
| 3 | Bafatá | 29,556 | Bafatá |
| 4 | Canchungo | 12,044 | Cacheu |
| 5 | Bissorã | 9,898 | Oio |
| 6 | Farim | 9,005 | Oio |
| 7 | Mansôa | 8,313 | Oio |
| 8 | Buba | 7,898 | Quinara |
| 9 | Cacheu | 5,891 | Cacheu |
| 10 | Quinhámel | 5,825 | Biombo |
| 11 | Quebo | 5,454 | Quinara |
| 12 | Catió | 5,081 | Tombali |
| 13 | Bolama | 5,026 | Bolama |

== Other settlements ==
- Boe
- Tombali
