= Guinala =

Biafada kingdom in pre-colonial Guinea-Bissau

Kingdom of Guinala
- Status: Kingdom
- Capital: Bruco
- Common languages: Biafada
- Religion: African traditional religions
- Government: Monarchy
- Farim
- Currency: cloth, iron, gold
Preceded by	Succeeded by
Mali Empire	Portuguese Guinea

Guinala or Quinara was an important Biafada kingdom in pre-colonial Guinea-Bissau situated between the Geba and Rio Grande de Buba rivers. The main port town, also called Guinala, was located on a tributary of the Buba, with the capital Bruco (or Buduco) a short distance inland.

== History ==
The kingdom was a regional power and important center of trade well before the arrival of Europeans. In the middle of the 15th century the kingdom defeated a large Fula armed migration from Futa Toro led by Dulo Demmba that had cut its way through several Wolof and Mandinka states.

The port of Guinala was the primary center of Euro-African trade in the region throughout the 16th century, exporting on average 3000 slaves a year to the Americas. The kingdom also boasted the region's largest weekly market at Bijorei. In the 1580s the lançados built a fort nearby, called Porto da Cruz, in order to defend against French pirates as well as potential conflict with their Biafada hosts. With this rejection of the pre-existing host-guest relationship, the Afro-Portuguese faced higher prices and rude, sometimes violent, treatment.

Guinala's economic importance waned in the early decades of the 17th century. In 1610 raiders from the Bijagos islands attacked Porto da Cruz and disrupted trade there. As the market of Bijorei waned, the lançados abandoned the fort and moved upstream to Bolola, near modern-day Buba. The slow decline of the Atlantic slave trade in the 18th and 19th centuries reinforced the trend.

== Government ==
The king was a subject of the mansa of Kaabu, and at times the overlord of the Papel state of Bissau. He had seven chiefs under him, and so exerted absolute authority only in the town of Guinala itself. The king ruled with the help of a Privy Council which, according to John Ogilby's late 17th century atlas, was composed of the vassal chiefs as well as a "main governor." Ogilby also claimed that, upon the king's death, his wives, servants, horses, and court favorites would be killed and buried alongside him to serve him in the afterlife.

== Legacy ==
The modern Quinara region is named after the kingdom.
