= Empada (Guinea-Bissau) =

- City
- Location of Empada in Guinea-Bissau Empada (Africa)
- Coordinates: 11°33′N 15°14′W
- Country: Guinea-Bissau
- Region: Quinara

Population (2009 census)
  - Total: 2,267
  - Ethnicities: Beafada Mandinka Balanta Fula
  - Religions: Muslim traditional
- Time zone: UTC+0 (GMT)
- ISO 3166 code: GW-BS
- Climate: Aw

Empada is a town and a sector with the same name in the Quinara region of Guinea-Bissau. The city is located on the Buba river, the sector borders the Atlantic Ocean to the west.

Originally, residents settled on the site of the town because of the presence of a natural spring, locally called "sanjuna". The Portuguese government tiled the well in 1946 and named it Fonte Frondosa (the leafy fountain).

The city has 2267 inhabitants; the sector has 17,517 inhabitants (census 2009). Children under the age of five constituted 22% of the population. Illiteracy is high: 11% of men and 23% of women were unable to read and write in 2009. The inhabitants are mainly of the Beafada population with significant minorities of Mandinka and some Balanta and Fula.

The city of Empada has two parts with a subdivision into three districts (bairros), each with a village elder.

The sector Empada includes 85 towns, mainly rural villages (tabancas).

The main locations are (population in brackets, according to the 2009 census):

- Batambali (690)
- Darsalam (713)
- Empada (2267)
- Francunda Beafada (1255)
- Gã-Comba Beafada (588)
- Medina de Cima Beafada (234)
- Madina de Baixo (387)
- Sao Miguel Balanta (387)

In addition to a few dozen primary schools, Empada has a lyceum called Liceu Dom Settimio A.Ferrazetti. In 2021 the lyceum had more than 1000 students. There is a health center called Rui Djassi with about ten beds and a delivery room (maternidade).

The main economic activities of the population of the sector are cashew cultivation, palm oil production, fishing and, mostly for their own use, cultivation of peanuts, beans, rice and various fruits.

The Guinea-Bissau politician Teodora Inácia Gomes was born in 1944 in Empada.

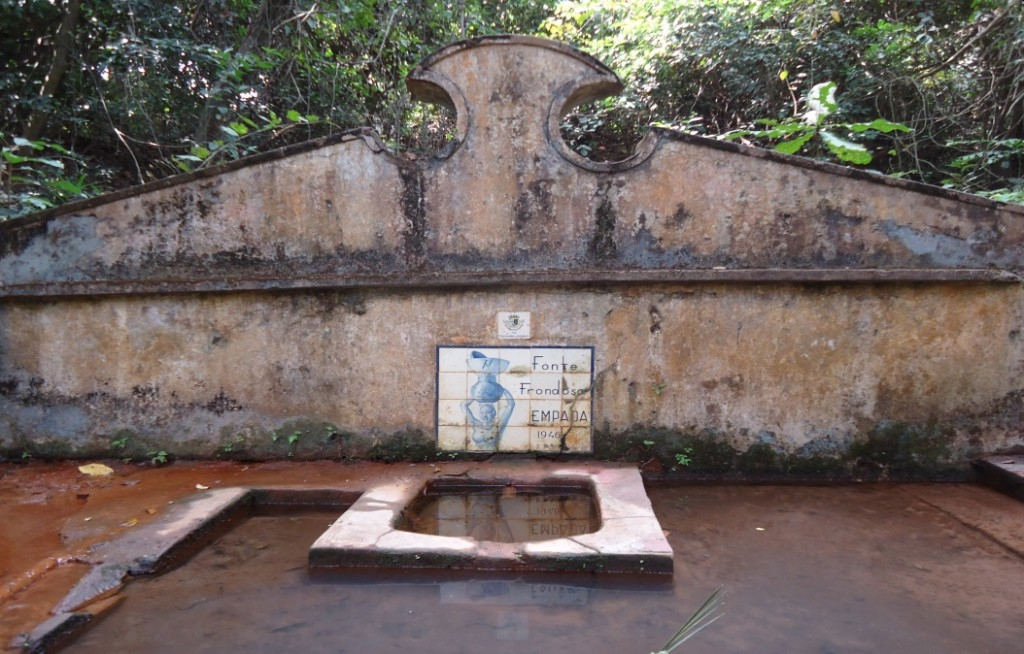
Source Fonte Frondosa, Empada, since 1946

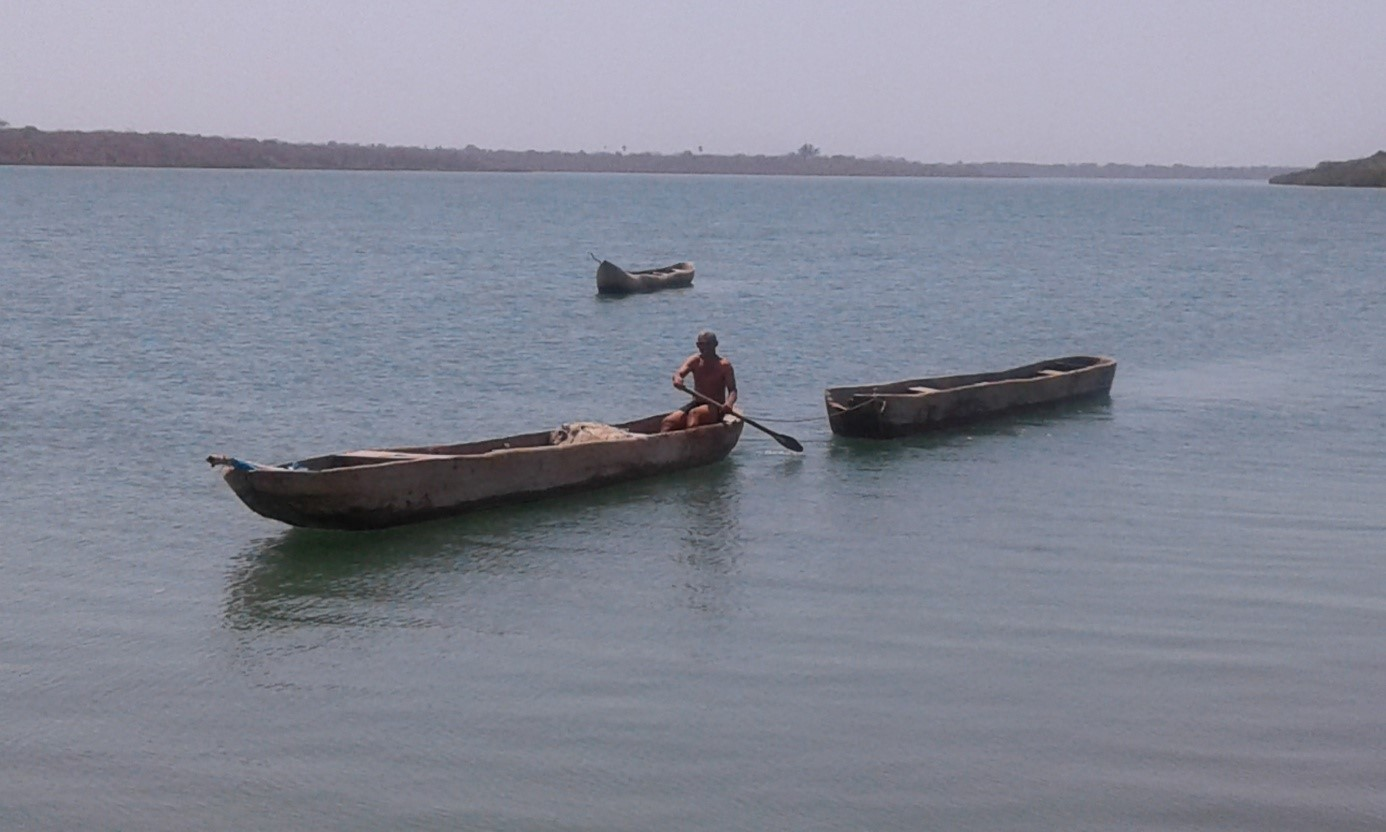
Buba river near Empada, 2018
