= Bolama =

Bolama may refer to several locations in Guinea-Bissau:

- Bolama Region
- Bolama Island
- Bolama (town), capital of the region and main town of the island
