= Maio Island =

Maio Island may refer to:

- Maio, Cape Verde
- Maio, one of the Bissagos Islands in Guinea-Bissau
