= Biafada people =

Ethnic group of Guinea-Bissau, Senegal, and The Gambia

Biafada
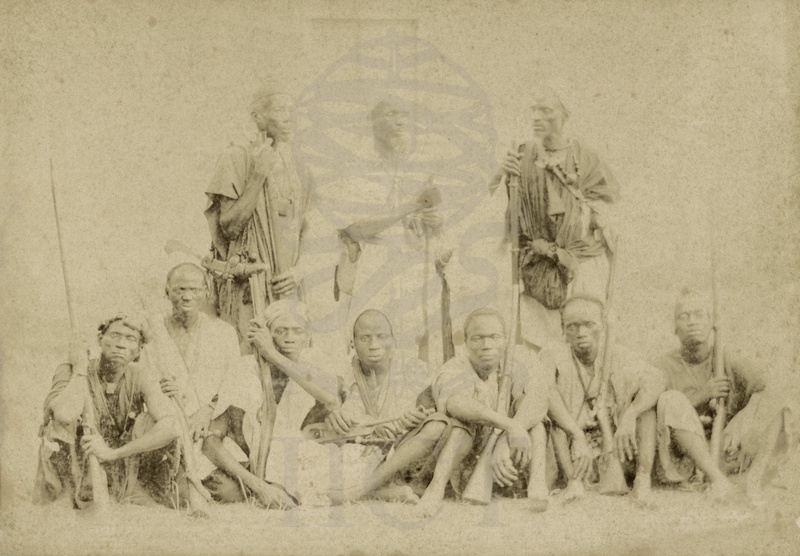
- Photo of a Biafada tribe. December 1891.

Regions with significant populations
- Guinea-Bissau, Senegal and Gambia

Languages
- Biafada language, Gool (in Geba River), Bubwas, Guinala (both in Quinara Region), Bagandada (Tombali) and French language

Religion
- Islam (majority religion) and Christians (Catholics) or animists (minority religion)

The Biafada people is an ethnic group of Guinea-Bissau, Senegal and Gambia. This group is often considered as a subgroup of the Tenda people. They are also known as Biafara, Beafada, Biafar, Bidyola, Dfola, Dyola, Fada, and Yola.

== Demography ==
In Guinea Bissau, the Biafada are divided into four groups. A small group lives on the north bank of the Geba River and speaks the Gool dialect. Two large groups reside in Quinara Region, the southwestern part of the country, and they speak the Bubwas and Guinala dialects. The fourth group live in the southern province of Tombali, on the border with Guinea Conakry, and speaks the dialect Bagandada.

== History ==
They were once grouped into three kingdoms: Biguda, Guinala and Bissege.

The Biafada speak the Biafada language, which belongs to the Niger-Congo languages family.

== Economy ==
Like most West Africans, the Biafada are farmers. The staple crops for these people are cassava and rice. However, due to globalization, they also raise other crops that originated in other parts of the world: maize, squash, melons, potatoes, peppers and tomatoes. Devoted to livestock, the Biafadas raise sheep and goats for meat, as they do not drink milk from those animals. This reduces the importance of the hunting.

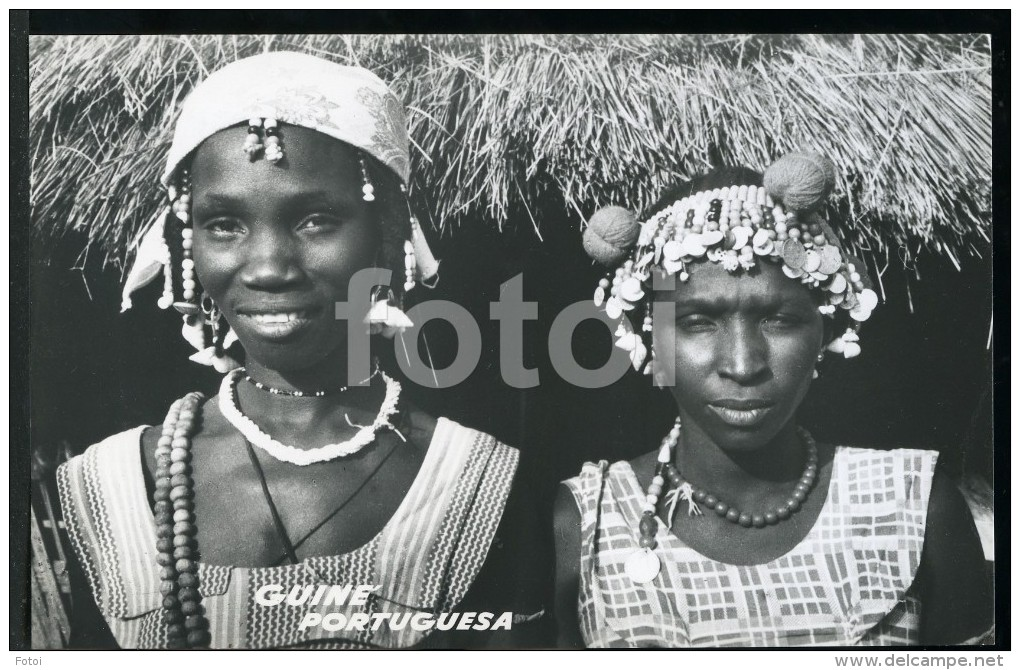
Biafada women adorned with ornaments in the city of Fulacunda, Guinea Bissau (1960s). Photo by A. B. Geraldo

== Culture ==
A ceremony celebrates as each child prepares to enter puberty. One characteristic of these ceremonies is the practice of circumcision. Normally, this applies to males, but sometimes also to females.

In more conservative families it is forbidden for a woman to become pregnant outside of marriage. If this happens, the woman and the man are subject to heavy punishment known as "di minjer justisa" (literally:' justice for women"). This was banned by Guinea Bissau in the 1970s. However, actually, Polygamy is common.

The majority of Biafadas are Sunni Muslims. However, some are Catholics or animists who believe that objects have spirits. The Biafadas mix Islam with animistic rites. About a dozen Biafada are Protestants, most resident in Biafada. Other Biafadas are Catholics in the capital.
