= Teodora Inácia Gomes =

- Deputy: African Party for the Independence of Guinea and Cape Verde (PAIGC)

Personal details
- Born: 13 September 1944 (age 82) Empada
- Citizenship: Guinea-Bissau
- Occupation: Politician

Teodora Inácia Gomes (born 13 September 1944) is a politician, feminist and women's rights activist, who is a former fighter in the struggle for independence of Guinea-Bissau from Portuguese rule, and is Deputy Leader of African Party for the Independence of Guinea and Cape Verde (PAIGC).

== Early life ==
Teodora Inácia Gomes, nicknamed "Obono" by her family, was born in Empada, in the Quínara Region of southern Guinea-Bissau on 13 September 1944. One of six children, she had four brothers and one sister, Joana Gomes; her father was Inácio Pedro Gomes. Her family were Christian and she attended a Catholic school. When her father was young he emigrated to Porto, Portugal and was one of a small number of Guineans who studied outside the Portuguese colony. Her father made important connections with the Portuguese Communist Party whilst there. Gomes' mother came from an ethnic group, whose social organization was matrilineal. They both were active in the liberation movement. Gomes stresses the importance that the relationship with her father had in her political formation.

== Independence movement ==
In 1962 Gomes joined the armed struggle and became a member of the African Party for the Independence of Guinea and Cape Verde (PAIGC), a movement that, among other principles, established equality between men and women, stating that "men and women enjoy the same rights in the family, at work and in public activities". In the PAIGC, Gomes worked closely with Amílcar Cabral and collaborated with him. She also worked as a medic and as a politics teacher. She also had military training and commanded a unit of 95 women. One of the women she fought alongside in 1963 was Titina Silá, whose death in 1973, during the crossing of Rio de Farim, is commemorated on 30 January each year as the National Day of Guinean Women. In August 1963, Gomes and Silá travelled to the Soviet Union to undertake a political internship.

Gomes received a scholarship in 1964 and went to study in Kiev, Ukraine. During her time in Kiev she participated in youth and women's social movements and spread the ideals and objectives of the PAIGC liberation movement and its armed struggle. In 1966 Gomes returned to Conakry, where she continued her activities as a teacher at Jardim Escola de Ratoma (Instituto Amizade); from 1969 to 1971 she was Director of the school.

== Post-independence ==
After Guinea-Bissau won its independence in 1974, Gomes was elected as a deputy in the National People's Assembly of Guinea-Bissau representing the PAIGC. In 1976 she was elected one of four vice-presidents of the Guinean-Soviet Friendship Association.

As a politician she has defended women's rights throughout her career and was instrumental in making female genital mutilation illegal in Guinea Bissau. She has also proposed other laws, protecting the rights of former freedom fighters, laws of reproductive health, laws against trafficking minors, laws on family planning and laws prohibiting violence against women. In 2015 she was a participant at Socialist International's conference in Luanda. Gomes also works with a non-governmental organisation, which aims to raise political awareness and to increase the number of women in the various government bodies. In 2019 the organisation was particularly active, hoping for a record number of women to be selected to represent their political parties after the election; ultimately 14 women were given seats, out of 102, the same number as in the 2014 election.
