= Bijago art =

African art produced by the people of the Bijagós Islands

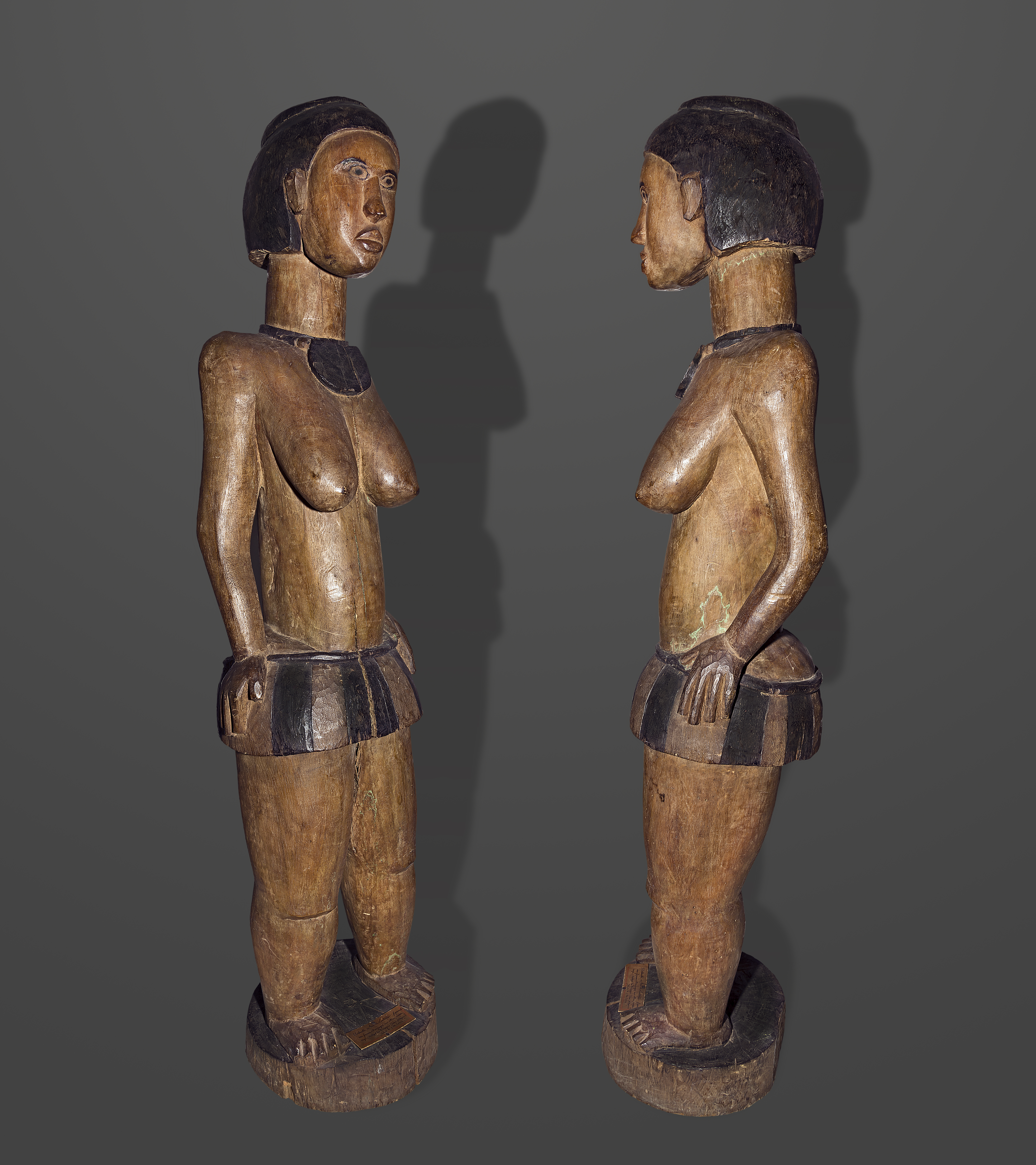
Sculpture of a woman MHNT

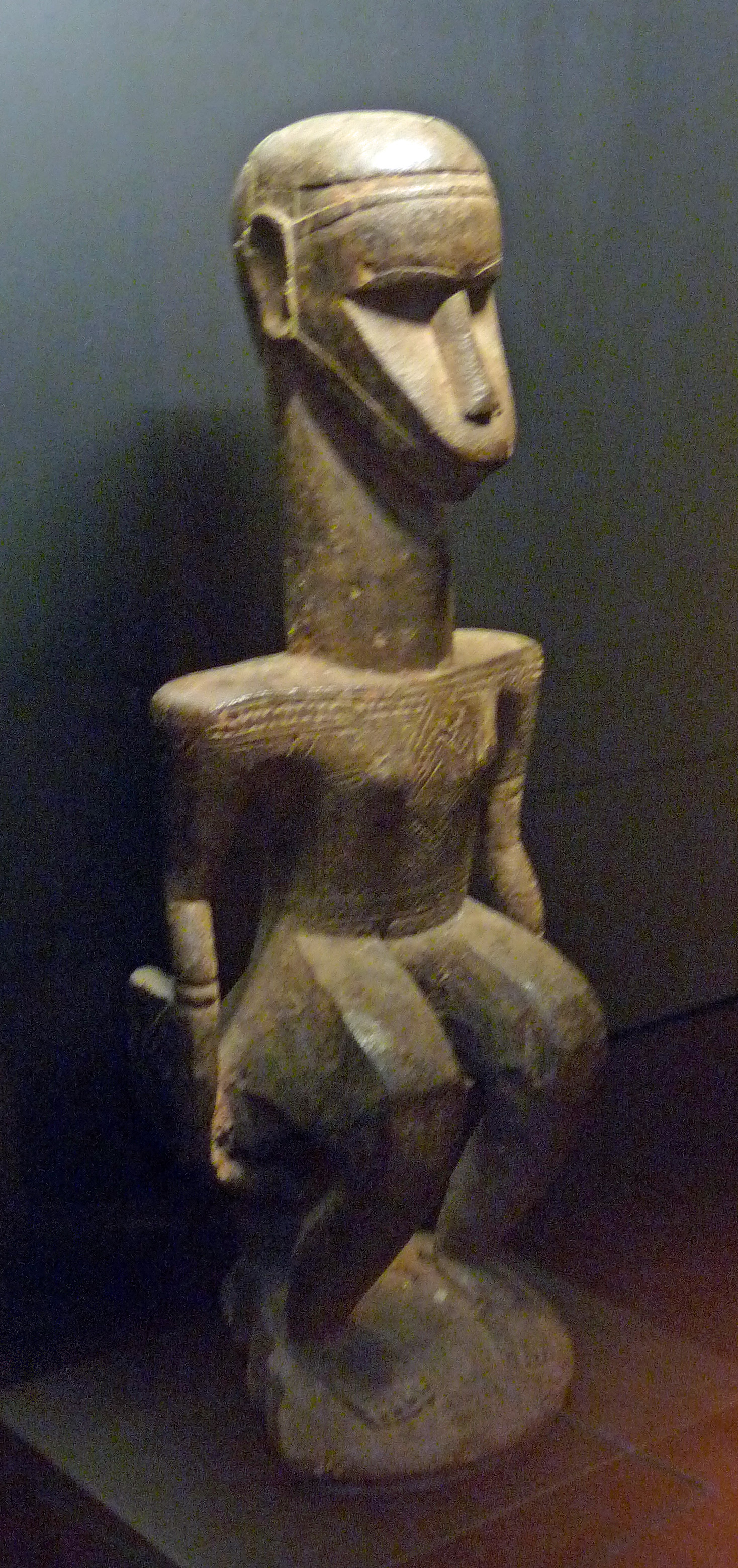
Bijago altar statue

Bijago art or Bidyogo art is African tribal art produced by the natives of the Bijagos Islands of Guinea-Bissau. It includes many artifacts for daily use and ritual practices, following a traditional iconography that is unique to their culture, but shows variations from island to island. Such art pieces are known as Bidyogo art and their unique aesthetics make Bidyogo art distinctive from all other African art with the exception of the nearby Baga people who share some of the iconography (and are considered a "related tribe" by Bacquart)."

== Shrine pieces ==
Among the most striking Bidyogo art pieces are the portable ancestor shrines ("iran") that can either be realistic or abstract.

== Zoomorphic masks for coming-of-age rituals ==
Zoomorphic masks representing cows ("vaca-bruta"), sharks, stingrays and, occasionally, other local animals are worn in adult initiation rituals ("fanado") mostly by boys, but occasionally by women.

== Other ritual paraphernalia ==
Traditionally-decorated artifacts are also produced for "fanado" coming-of-age ceremonies (wood masks, spears, shields, headgear, bracelets). Girls are also given stylized dolls to learn about child-caring.

== Daily use objects ==
The Bissagos produce unique objects for daily activities (fishing, agriculture) and personal use (stools, basketry, foodware) and boats.

== Architecture ==
While most Bidyogo hut dwellings show no remarkable artistry, some have their walls painted in bright colors with traditional symbols and patterns. Occasionally, doors are also painted with human or animal figures.

== Pieces for the tourist trade ==
Some of the village artists carve for ritual use as well as for the tourist trade, which can thus enable visitors to acquire ethnographically interesting pieces.
