= Tite (Guinea-Bissau) =

Coordinates: 11°47′N 15°24′W

Tite is one of four Sectors of Quinara Region of Guinea-Bissau. It has an area of 699.5 km^{2}.

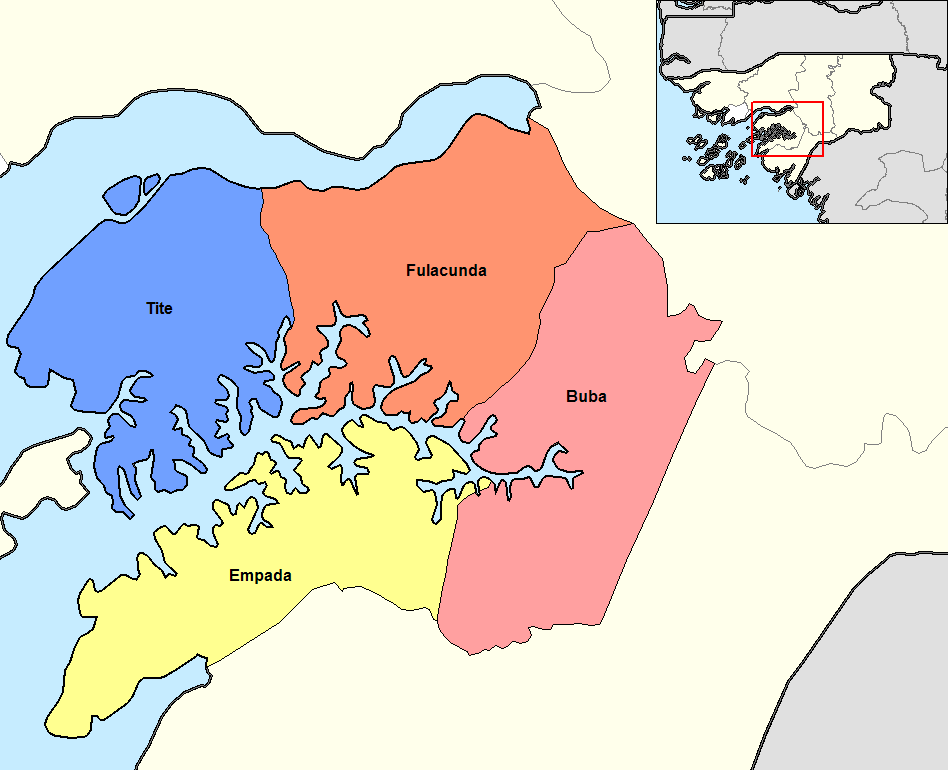
Sectors of Quinara Region, with Tite marked blue
