= Buba =

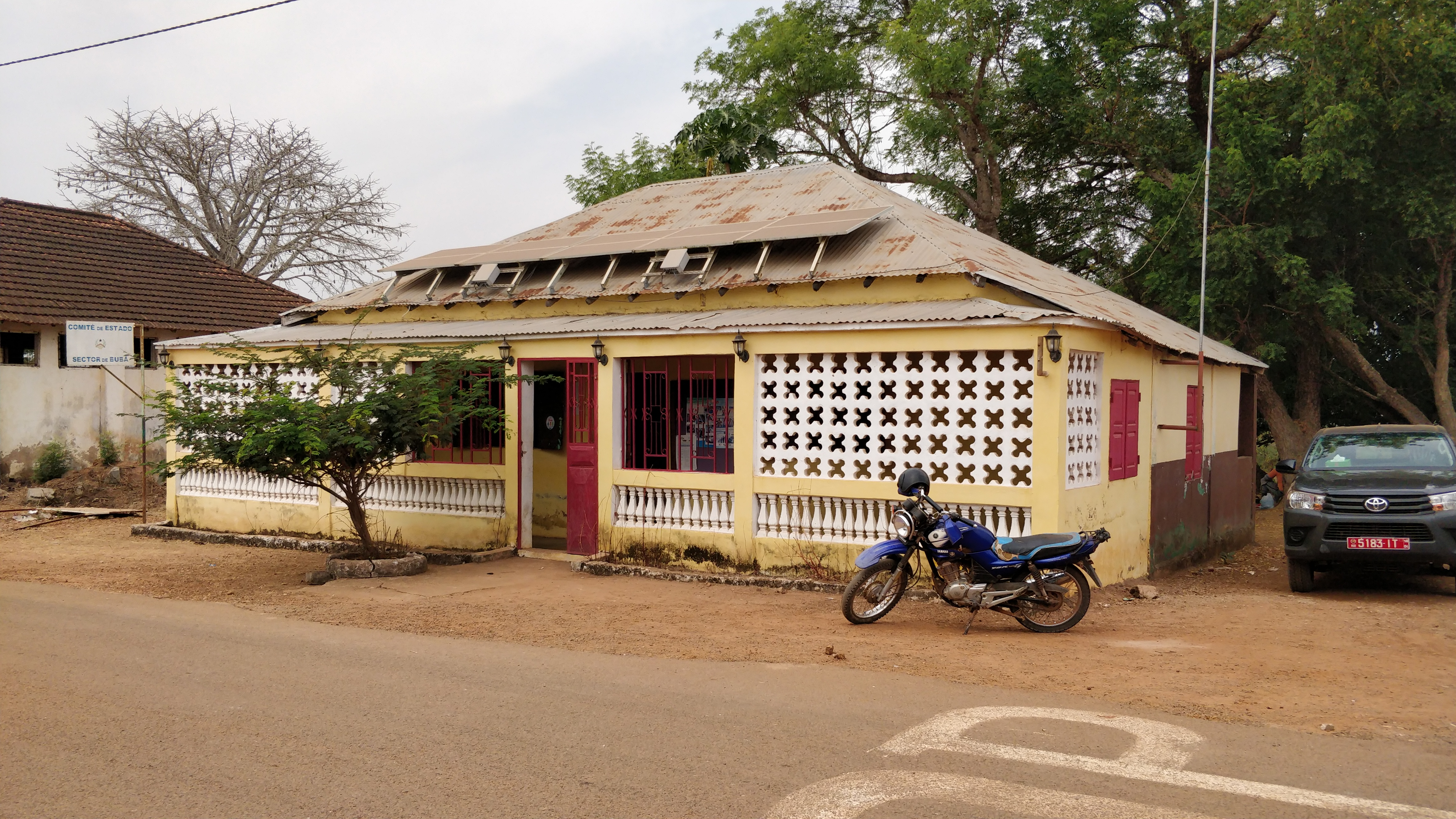
- Colonial building in Buba

- Location in Guinea-Bissau
- Coordinates: 11°35′24″N 14°59′24″W
- Country: Guinea-Bissau
- Region: Quinara Region
- Elevation: 3 m (9.8 ft)

Population (2012)
  - Total: 8,556

Buba is the largest city in southern Guinea-Bissau and the capital of the Quinara region. It lies on the extreme end of the Rio Grande de Buba, near the Contanhez National Park, and has a population 6,815 (2008 est).

== History ==
The area that is now Buba was once a part of the Biafada kingdom of Biguba. The city's name is a corruption of this state, although the modern town was not prominent until the 19th century.

Buba was the most important commercial center in Portuguese Guinea from the early 1840s to the late 1870s. During a civil war in Forria in the late 19th century Fula rimbe (noble) forces attacked Buba looking for escaped slaves, who had fled to the town for Portuguese protection. The instability led to a collapse in the peanut trade, crushing the town's economy. By the time the Portuguese had established control over the entire area, the economic heart of the colony had moved to Bissau and Bafata, leaving Buba a backwater.

The Portuguese constructed an army camp in Buba, which, shortly after independence, was used as the headquarters for a Dutch Foreign Aid Project aimed at providing the villages of Quinara and Tombali with safe drinking water. The construction of a plywood factory through Swedish Foreign Aid in 1982 boosted the economy and growth of Buba, as it installed a steam engine which produced enough electricity to supply the whole town. During his presidency, former President of Guinea-Bissau Kumba Yala planned to move the capital city to Buba. Those plans have been dropped since he was deposed in a coup d'état.

== Economy ==
Construction was planned for a new railway, road, and deepwater port that could host three 70-tonne vessels at any given time, built by Angola Bauxite in order to export bauxite. The 2012 Guinea-Bissau coup d'état saw the project suspended.
