= Fulacunda =

- Location in Guinea-Bissau
- Coordinates: 11°26′0″N 15°25′0″W
- Country: Guinea-Bissau
- Region: Quinara Region

Population (2008 est.)
  - Total: 1,311

Fulacunda is a town located in the Quinara Region of Guinea-Bissau.
