= Bolama Island =

Island of the Bissagos Islands, Guinea-Bissau

Bolama
Native name: Ilha de Bolama
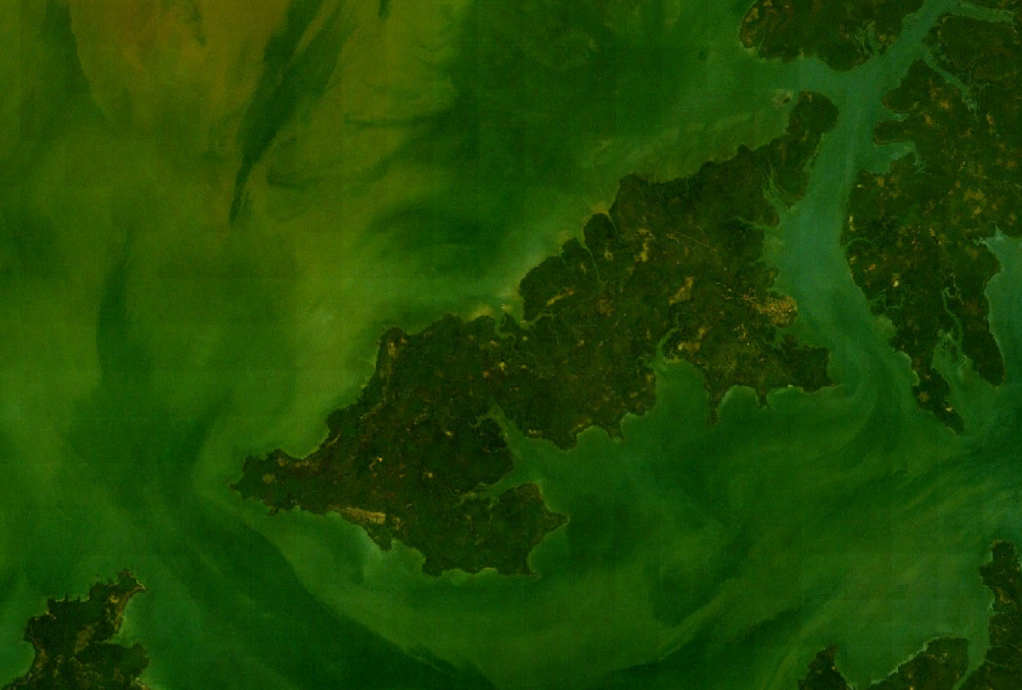
- Aerial image of Bolama

- Location within Guinea-Bissau

Geography
- Location: Atlantic Ocean
- Coordinates: 11°33′N 15°32′W
- Archipelago: Bissagos Islands
- Area: 65 km^{2} (25 sq mi)

Administration
- GNB

Demographics
- Population: 6024 (2009)2009 census
- Pop. density: 93/km^{2} (241/sq mi)

Bolama is the closest of the Bissagos Islands to the mainland of Guinea-Bissau. The island has a population of 6,024 (2009 census). It shares its name with its largest settlement, the town Bolama, which is the capital of the island and the Bolama Region. A causeway links the island to the Ilha das Cobras. Attractions on the island include sandy beaches and the abandoned ruins of the town of Bolama. It is known for its cashew nuts.

== Environment ==
Bolama is almost surrounded by mangrove swamps. The island, along with nearby parts of the mouth of the Rio Grande de Buba, have been designated an Important Bird Area (IBA) by BirdLife International because their intertidal mudflats and mangroves support significant populations of pink-backed pelicans, bar-tailed godwits, red knots, curlew sandpipers and gull-billed terns.

== History ==
In 1792, a group of officers of the Royal Navy led an attempt to resettle Black former slaves from the Americas on the island of Bulama off the coast of Portuguese Guinea. Philip Beaver was president of the council of the colonisation society; Richard Hancorn was vice-president. Most of the settlers died and the survivors abandoned the colony in November 1793 and made their way to Settler Town in what later became the Colony of Sierra Leone.

The Portuguese also claimed Bolama in 1830 and a dispute developed. In 1860, the British proclaimed the island annexed to Sierra Leone, but in 1870 a commission chaired by Ulysses S. Grant awarded Bolama to Portugal. Subsequently, in 1879, the town of Bolama became the first capital of Portuguese Guinea and remained so until its transfer to Bissau in 1941. Bissau had been founded in 1687 by Portugal as a fortified port and trading center. This transfer was needed due to the shortage of fresh water in Bolama. Bolama later became a seaplane stop, and a seaplane crash in 1931 is commemorated by a statue in the town.

A fruit processing plant was built on Bolama shortly after independence of Guinea-Bissau, with Dutch foreign aid. This plant produced canned juice and jelly of cashew fruit. However, it could not expand and had to shut down its operations, due to the shortage of fresh water on the island.

Bolama has been designated a biosphere reserve. The Bissau-Guinean government is aiming for it to be designated the nation's first World Heritage Site.
