= Bolama (town) =

- town
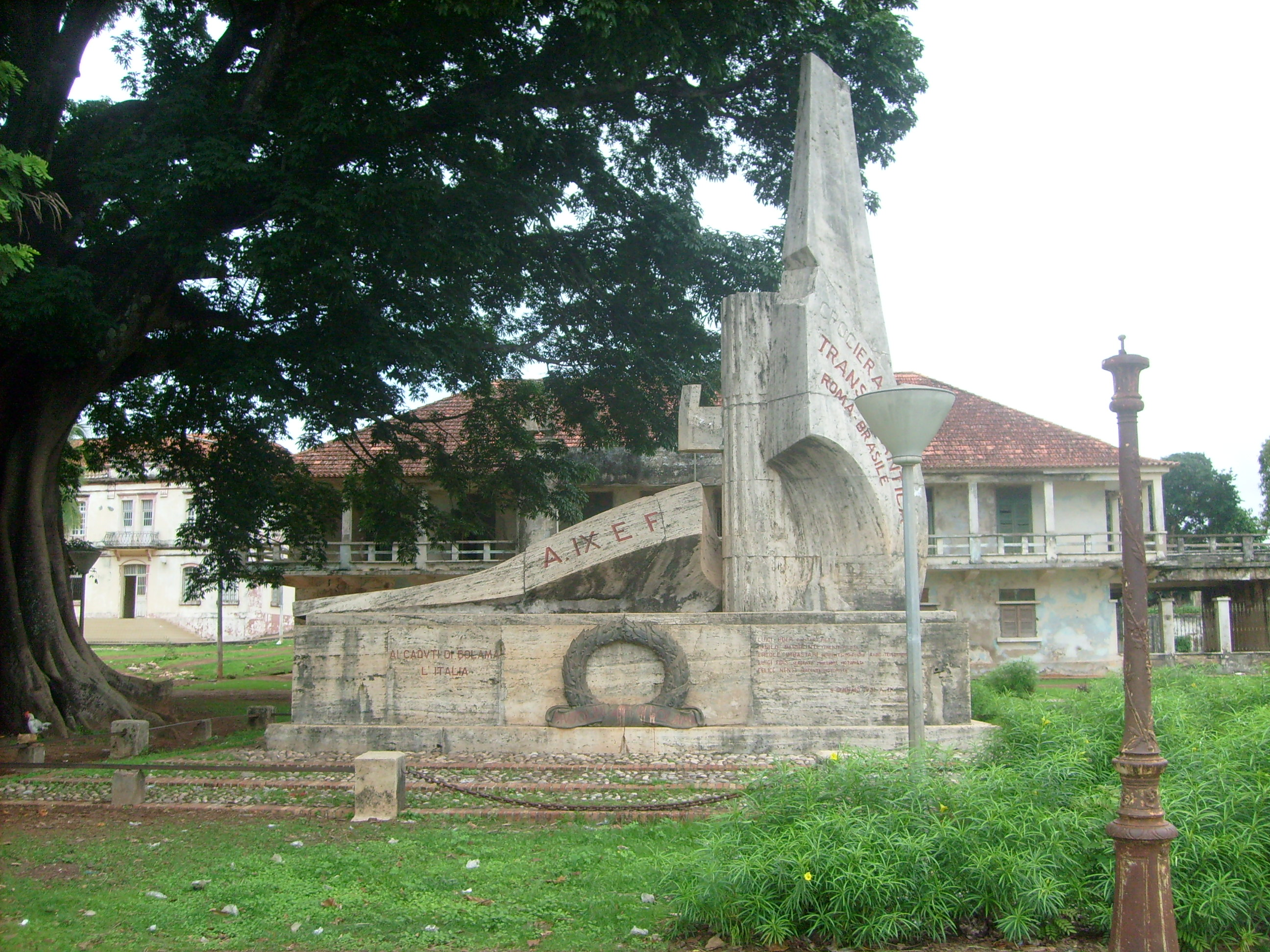
- Italian plane crash monument with Governor's palace

- Location in Guinea-Bissau
- Coordinates: 11°34′36″N 15°28′58″W
- Country: Guinea-Bissau
- Region: Bolama Region

Area
  - Total: 65 km^{2} (25 sq mi)
- Elevation: 0 m (0 ft)

Population (2009)
  - Total: 4,819
  - Density: 74/km^{2} (190/sq mi)

Bolama is the main town of Bolama Island and the capital of the Bolama Region. Though once the capital of Portuguese Guinea (now Guinea-Bissau), it has a population of just 4,819 (2009 census) and much of its colonial era architecture is in a state of severe decay. The town is almost surrounded by mangrove swamps and is now mostly known for its production of cashew nuts.

== History ==
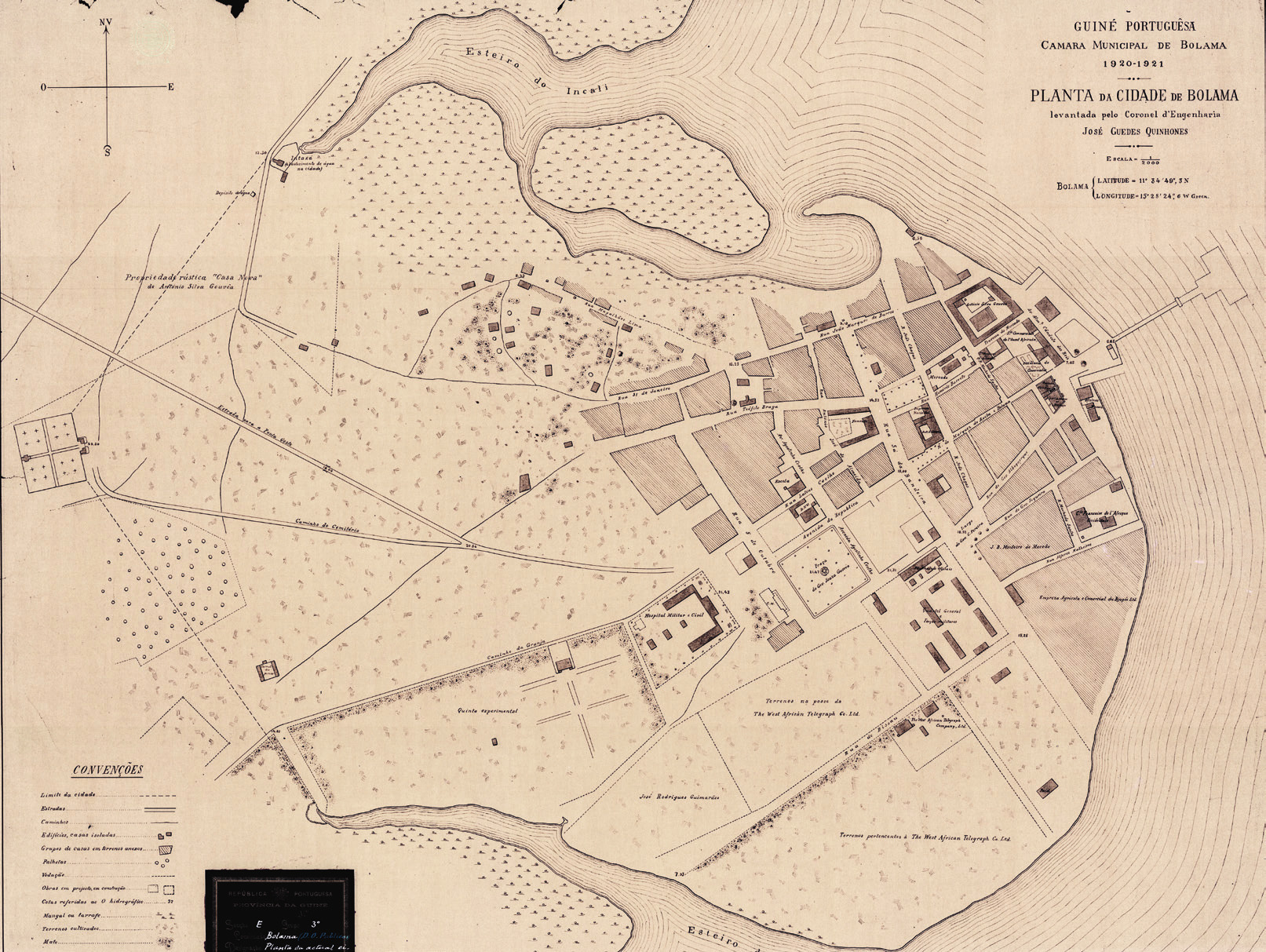
Map of Bolama, ca. 1920

Although often visited by local people, the island was apparently uninhabited in 1792 when European colonists arrived. The Bulama Association, a philanthropic and financial organisation, hoped to create a colony that would remove the need for slave plantations in the Caribbean by resettling Black former slaves from the Americas on the island. The expedition, which consisted of two ships and two hundred and seventy-five colonists, set sail from England on 14 April 1792. Philip Beaver, president of the council of the colonization society, was commander of HMS Hankey; Richard Hancorn, vice-president, was commander of HMS Calypso. Most of the settlers died and the survivors abandoned the colony in November 1793. Hancorn died on the island weeks after the other leaders had decided to return home, on 21 July 1792.

Another colonisation attempt in 1814 also failed. Nonetheless, Britain continued to press its territorial claims to the town and island, hoping to annex the region to colonial possessions in Sierra Leone. Britain formally annexed the location, making it the capital of British Guinea. This gave rise to the so-called Bolama Question, a diplomatic conflict initially raised at the Madrid conference of 1861, and dragging on until 1870 when it was eventually settled through an arbitration process overseen by United States President Ulysses S. Grant. The Portuguese negotiator, António José de Ávila, was rewarded by being declared duke of Ávila and Bolama.

In 1879, Bolama became the first capital of Portuguese Guinea and later became a logistical centre for seaplane transport. A seaplane crash in 1931 is commemorated by a statue in the town. However, a shortage of fresh water meant that Bolama could never hope to develop into a major city and on 6 December 1941 the colonial capital was moved to Bissau. Thereafter, the town of Bolama slowly fell into decay. Numerous abandoned houses now provide shelter for many thousands of enormous fruit eating bats. Every evening, these bats flock to the mainland, darkening the skies. The ruins, most notably that of the Bolama Governor's Palace, are something of a low key tourist attraction. The old colonial barracks are now used as a hospital. A fruit processing plant was built on Bolama shortly after independence of Guinea Bissau, with Dutch foreign aid. This plant produced canned juice and jelly from cashew fruit. However, it could not expand and had to shut down its operations, due to the shortage of fresh water on the island.

A metal statue of American President Ulysses S. Grant stood in the town until August 2007 when it was broken up by scrap metal scavengers. Grant had chaired an international arbitration committee that, in 1870, granted Bolama to Portugal rather than to Great Britain. In gratitude, Grant's image was one of few colonial era statues to have survived into independence in the 1970s. The primary school in Bolama is still named the Ulisses Grant School in the president's honour.

== Climate ==
Climate data for Bolama (1991–2020)
Month	Jan	Feb	Mar	Apr	May	Jun	Jul	Aug	Sep	Oct	Nov	Dec	Year
Mean daily maximum °C (°F)	32.4 (90.3)	33.7 (92.7)	33.9 (93.0)	33.3 (91.9)	32.8 (91.0)	31.6 (88.9)	30.0 (86.0)	29.6 (85.3)	30.4 (86.7)	31.6 (88.9)	32.1 (89.8)	31.8 (89.2)	31.9 (89.4)
Daily mean °C (°F)	25.5 (77.9)	26.6 (79.9)	27.4 (81.3)	27.3 (81.1)	27.5 (81.5)	26.9 (80.4)	25.8 (78.4)	25.7 (78.3)	26.1 (79.0)	26.9 (80.4)	27.0 (80.6)	25.6 (78.1)	26.5 (79.7)
Mean daily minimum °C (°F)	18.6 (65.5)	19.4 (66.9)	20.8 (69.4)	21.2 (70.2)	22.1 (71.8)	22.2 (72.0)	21.7 (71.1)	21.7 (71.1)	21.7 (71.1)	22.2 (72.0)	21.8 (71.2)	19.3 (66.7)	21.1 (70.0)
Average precipitation mm (inches)	0.1 (0.00)	1.1 (0.04)	0.1 (0.00)	0.0 (0.0)	27.8 (1.09)	195.5 (7.70)	534.1 (21.03)	622.5 (24.51)	424.9 (16.73)	202.2 (7.96)	20.8 (0.82)	0.1 (0.00)	2,029.2 (79.89)
Average precipitation days (≥ 1.0 mm)	0.0	0.0	0.0	0.0	2.5	12.0	23.7	26.6	23.5	17.4	4.1	0.0	109.8
Source: NOAA

== Twin towns – sister cities ==
Bolama is twinned with:

- Faro, Portugal

== Gallery ==
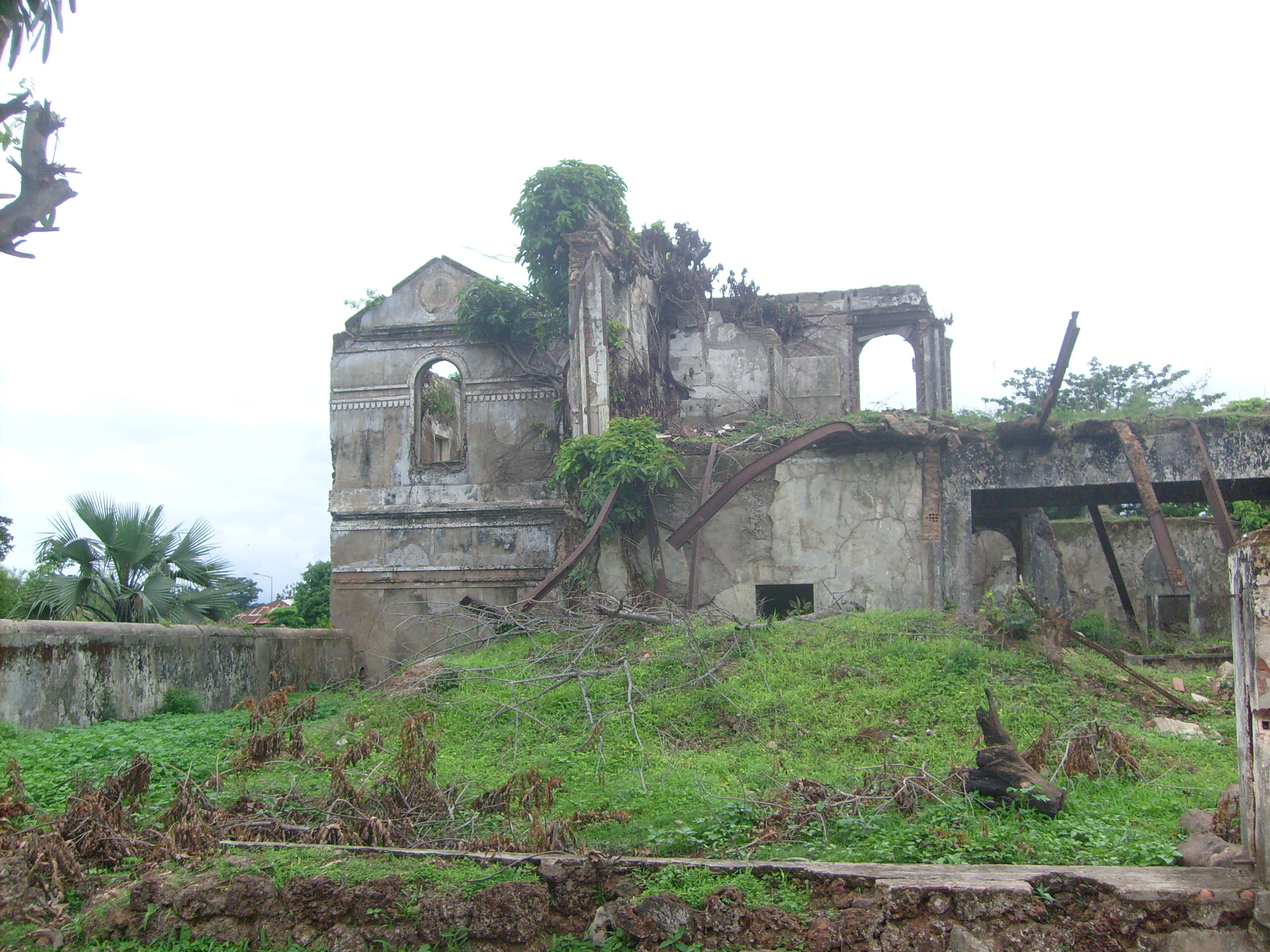
Ubiquitous ruins at Bolama streets

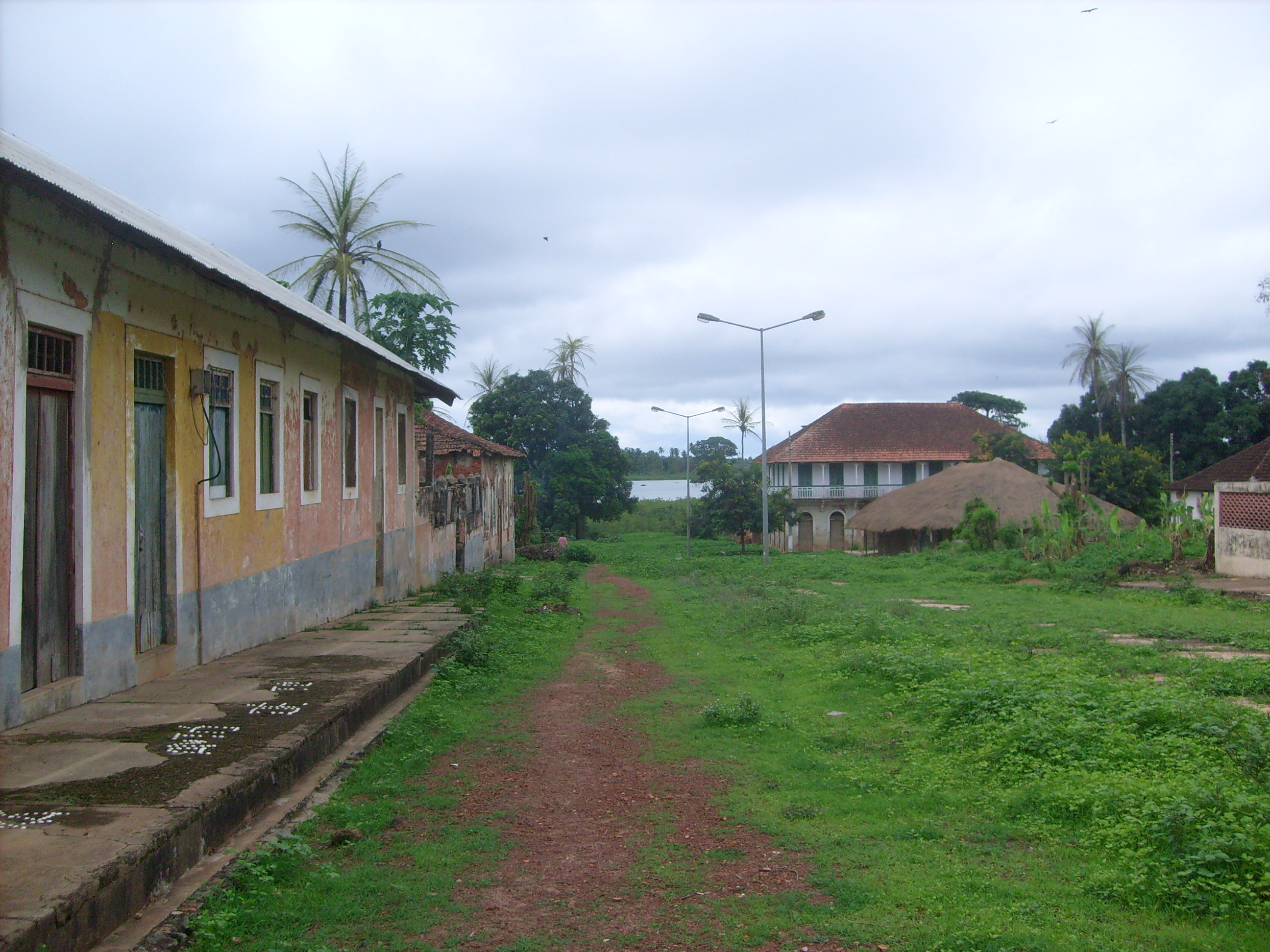
Street view

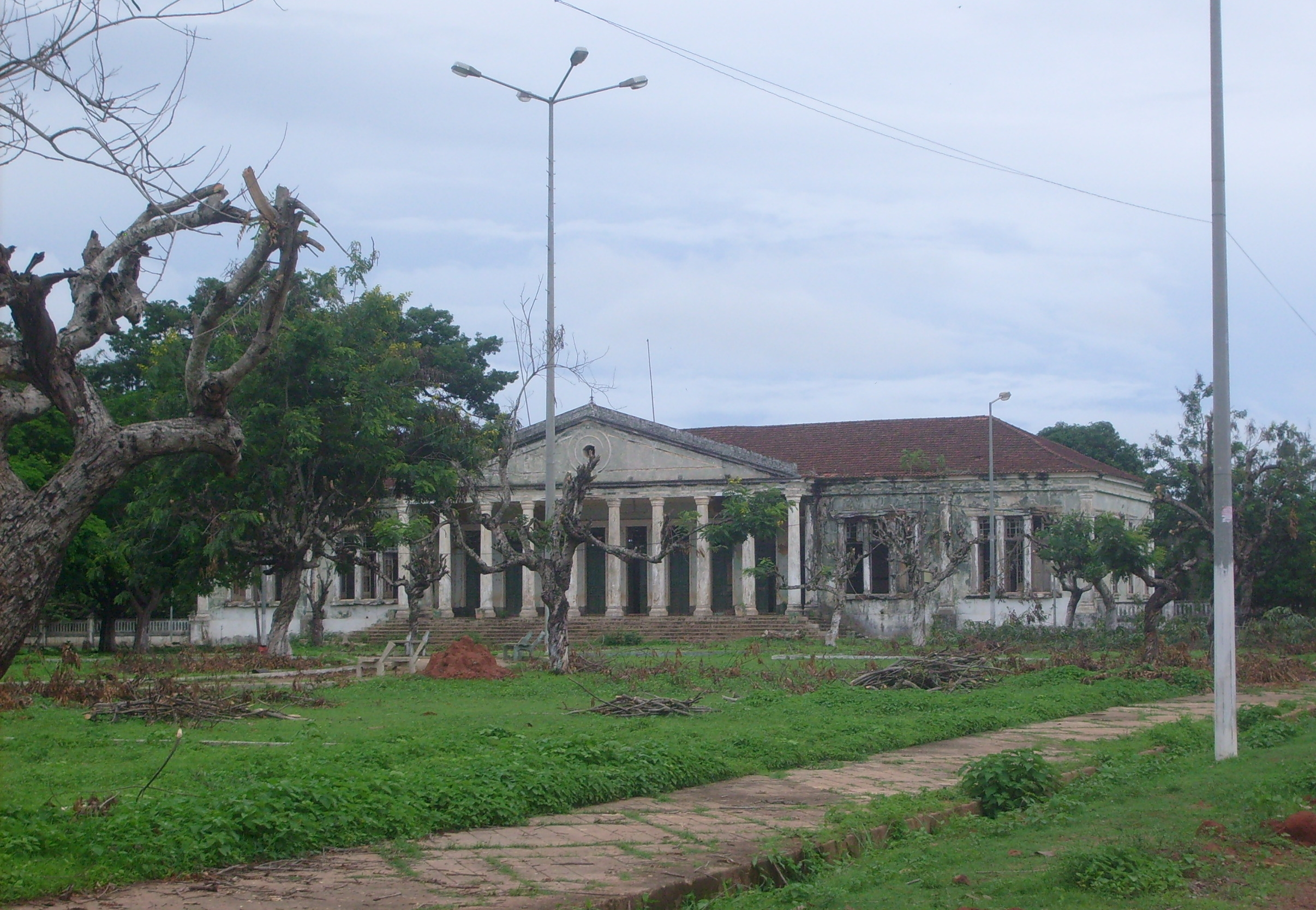
Ruins of former administration building
