= Tombali =

- Location in Guinea-Bissau
- Coordinates: 11°18′N 15°25′W
- Country: Guinea-Bissau
- Region: Tombali Region

Tombali is a town located in the Tombali Region of Guinea-Bissau.
