= Bijagós Islands =

Archipelago in Guinea-Bissau

Coordinates: 11°15′N 16°05′W

Designations

UNESCO World Heritage Site
- Official name: Coastal and Marine Ecosystems of the Bijagós Archipelago – Omatí Minhô
- Type: Natural
- Criteria: ix, x
- Designated: 2025
- Reference no.: 1431rev

Ramsar Wetland
- Official name: Archipel Bolama-Bijagós
- Designated: 14 January 2014
- Reference no.: 2198

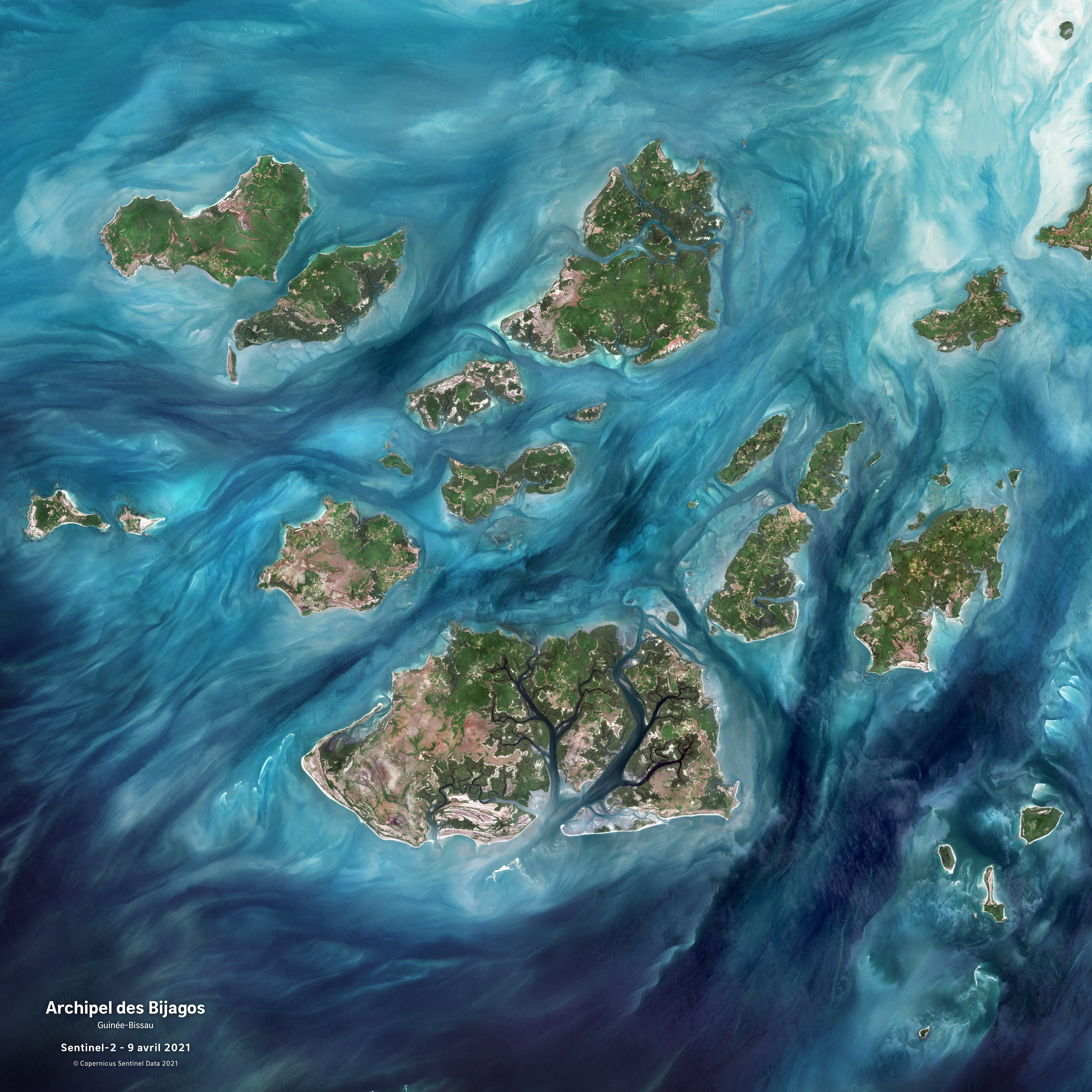
The Bijagós islands off the coast of Guinea-Bissau

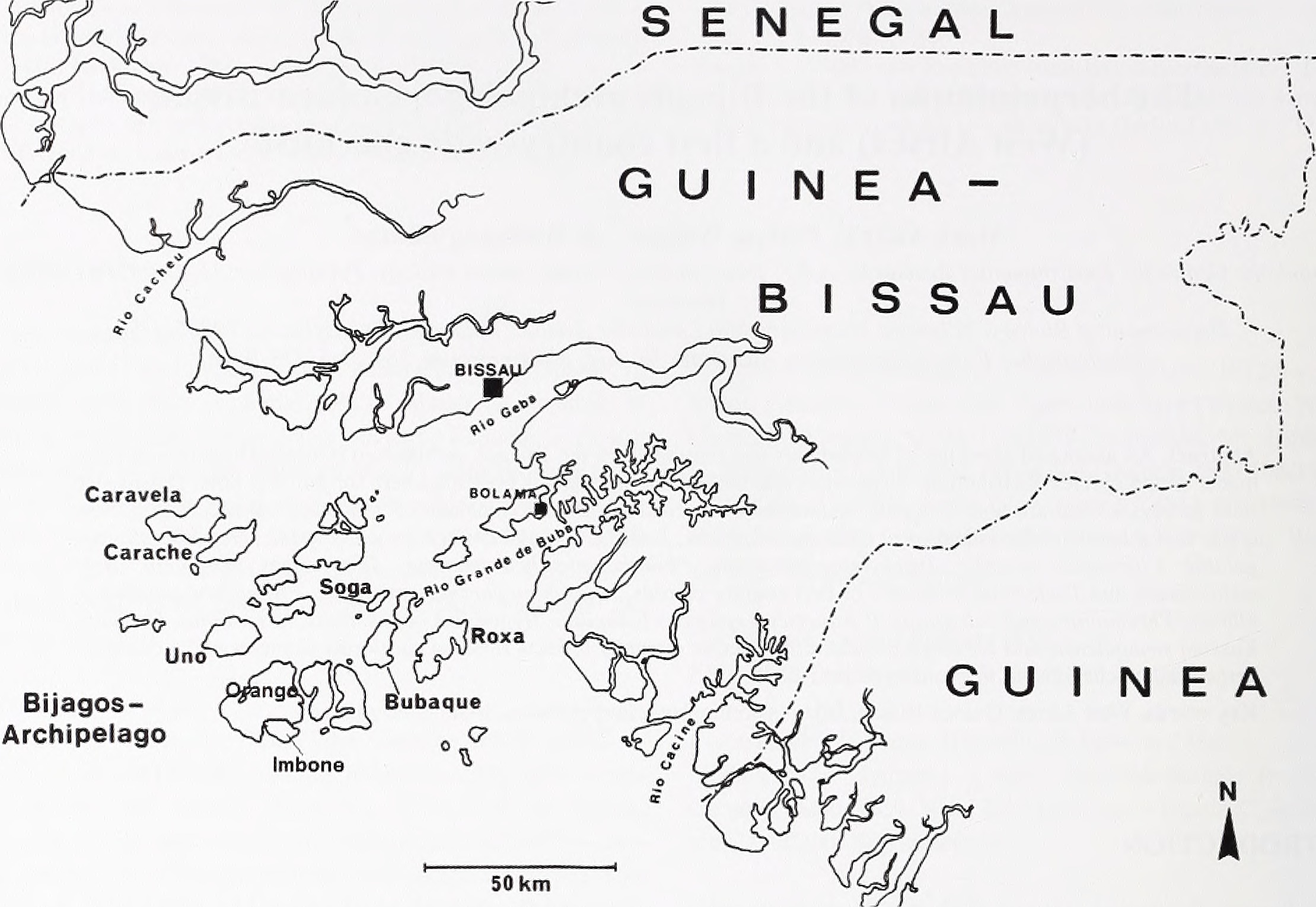
Map of Guinea Bissau with the Bijagós Islands

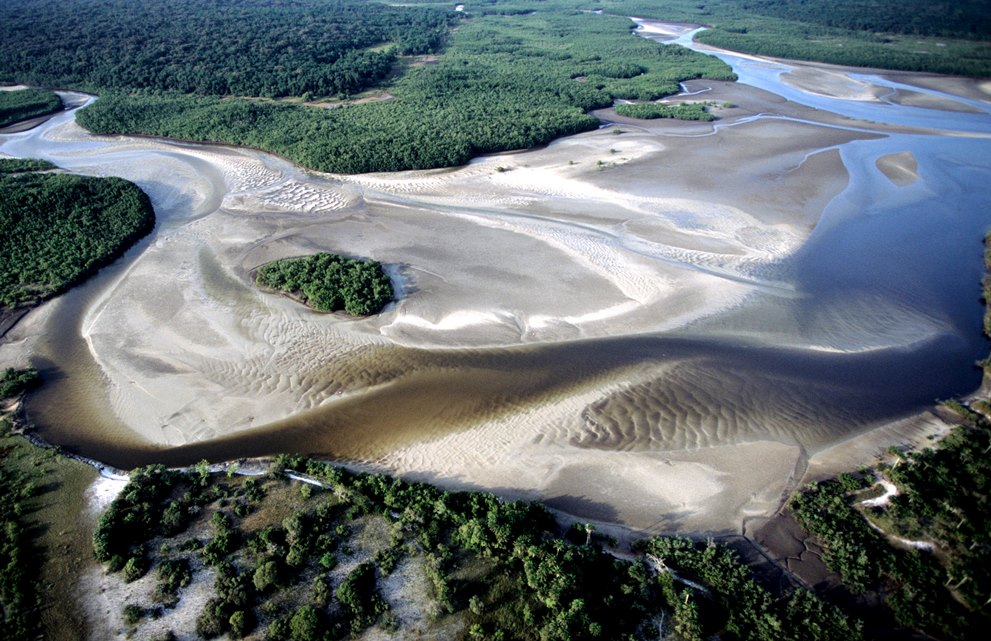
Ramsar Site

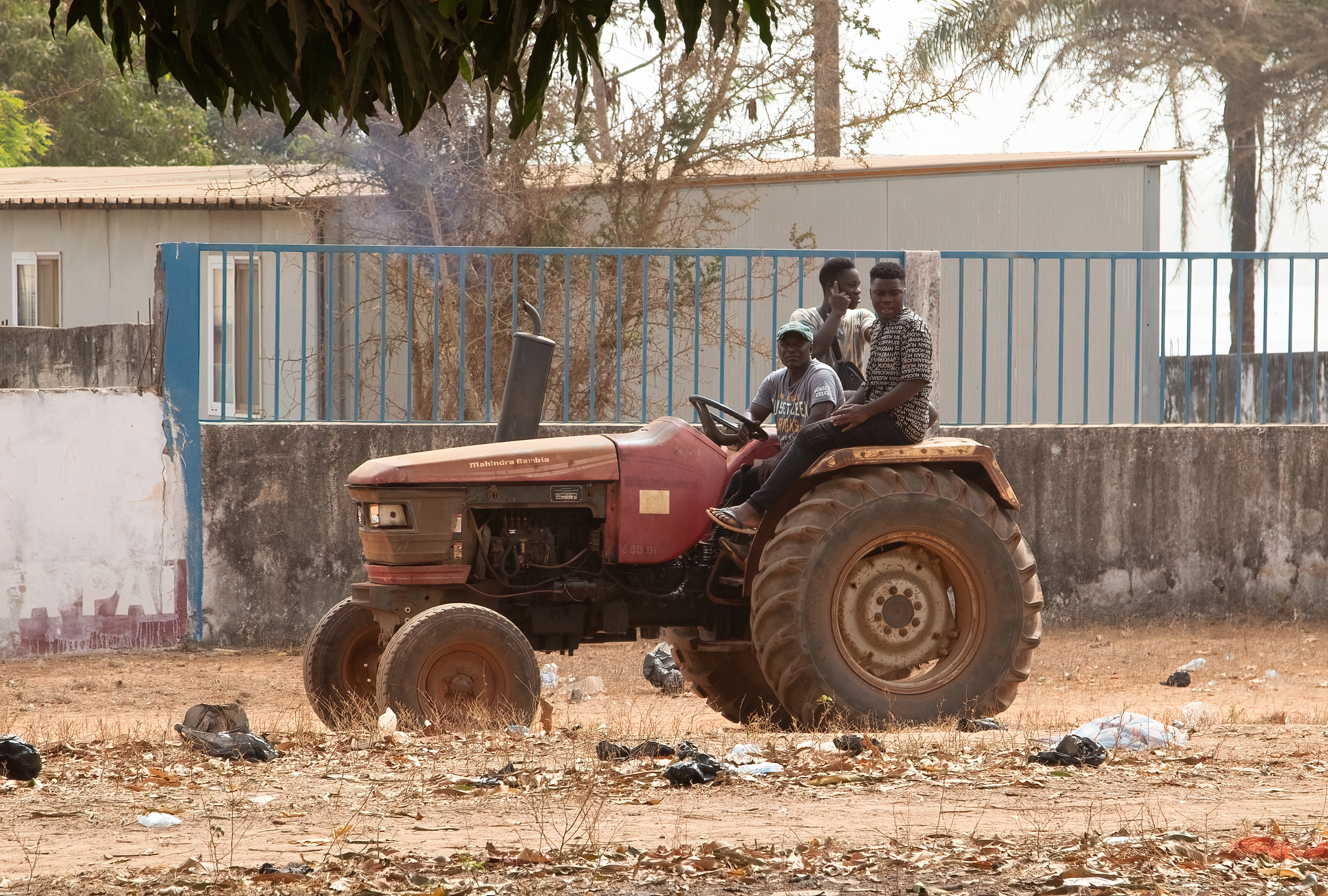
Three men in Bubaque on a Mahindra tractor manufactured at the company's plant in Gambia.

The Bijagós Islands (Portuguese: Arquipélago dos Bijagós), often misspelled Bijagos in English text and formerly known in English as Bissagots (often misspelled Bissagos), are a group of about 88 islands and islets located in the Atlantic Ocean off the coast of Guinea-Bissau.

== Geography ==
The archipelago was formed from the ancient delta of the Geba and Grande de Buba rivers and spans an area of 12,958 km^{2} (5,003 sq mi). Twenty of its islands are populated year-round, including the most populated island, Bubaque. The administrative capital, Bolama is situated on the island of Bolama.

=== Environment ===
There is a high diversity of ecosystems: mangroves with intertidal zones, palm forests, dry and semi-dry forests, secondary and degraded forests, coastal savanna, sand banks and aquatic zones. The archipelago was declared a UNESCO Biosphere Reserve in 1996. The site has been designated an Important Bird Area (IBA) by BirdLife International because its intertidal mudflats and mangroves support significant populations of non-breeding and wintering waterbirds, especially large numbers of migratory Palaearctic waders, gulls and terns, as well as greater flamingos and pink-backed pelicans.

=== Demographics ===
The population is estimated at 30,000 (2006) and the ethnic group Bissago (Portuguese: Bijagó) predominates. It has a relatively youthful population due to high birth rates and low life expectancy.

== Economy ==
The economy is largely rural, with many families living from subsistence farming and fishing. There is some tourist activity, mostly boat charters from neighboring Senegal. Lack of infrastructure and communication links prevent the development of the islands' tourism potential. Starting in the early 2000s, several of the islands began to be used as transit depots for narcotraffic, which is quickly changing the social and economic fabric of the islands.

== History ==
In pre-European colonial times, the islands were central to the trade along the coast of West Africa and they built up a powerful navy. In 1532, King Joao III of Portugal ceded a nominal right to the islands to his brother Luis, Duke of Beja as well as generous trading rights. In 1535, Dom Luis sent a force to conquer the islands, but the islanders' strong navy destroyed it, leaving few survivors. For years afterwards the Bijagós refused to trade with the Portuguese and treated any shipwrecked sailors harshly, until relations were restored around 1550. The Bissago islanders then became important providers of slaves to the Portuguese, putting aside inter-island rivalries to raid the mainland.

In 1849, with the people of the Bijagós still fiercely independent, the British and French mounted a joint expedition to 'pacify' the islands, but they were repulsed. The Portuguese tried several times to put down 'tax revolts' in the islands in the early 20th century but largely failed. The islands were not formally annexed by Portugal until 1937.

The Bijagós were visited by Austrian anthropologist and photographer Hugo Bernatzik in 1930–1931, who documented daily life among the Bidyogo people.

The London School of Hygiene and Tropical Medicine is conducting research here to study cures for some of the world's deadliest infectious diseases. Because the islands are so isolated there is less danger of contamination of the results than in other places.

In 2025, the islands were designated as a World Heritage Site by UNESCO.

== Culture ==
Due to difficulties of communication with mainland Guinea-Bissau that persist to this day, the population has a considerable degree of autonomy and has shielded its ancestral culture from outside influence. The Bijago language is spoken along with Portuguese and creole.

Author Paulo Feytor Pinto wrote that, circa 2024, Kriol Guinensi is the most prominent language in cities, while Bidyogo is the most prominent language in the countryside, with Kriol Guinensi there being a second language. According to Pinto, in regards to Portuguese, it "is not often used, not even in school or among teachers."

Some authors argue that Bijago culture tends to be matriarchal, with women managing the household, the economy, law, as well as initiating courtship (women choose their husbands and terminate the matrimony). Other sources dispute this and suggest that closer examination has revealed a fundamentally patriarchal society where women, in spite of their substantial participation in material production and important roles in social, political, and religious matter, remain essentially unequal to men. A 2016 study suggested that female status in Bijagos society was diminished during the slave trade era (likely due to European influence) but has become more valued again in more recent times.

In 2012, a study by Bissau-Guinean sociologist Boaventura Santy examined the social representations of the people of the island of Formosa Bijagó about possible threats from climate change. The study concluded that for "the Bijagó the natural and the social are inextricably linked, to the extent that a crisis in the social system would have negative effects" on the natural system. In particular, it was the lack of harmony between the community, ancestors and the supernatural world that was seen as causing environmental dissonance.

As of 2024 some people from neighboring French-speaking countries are in the islands, and they use French, along with tourists from French-speaking countries.

=== Art ===
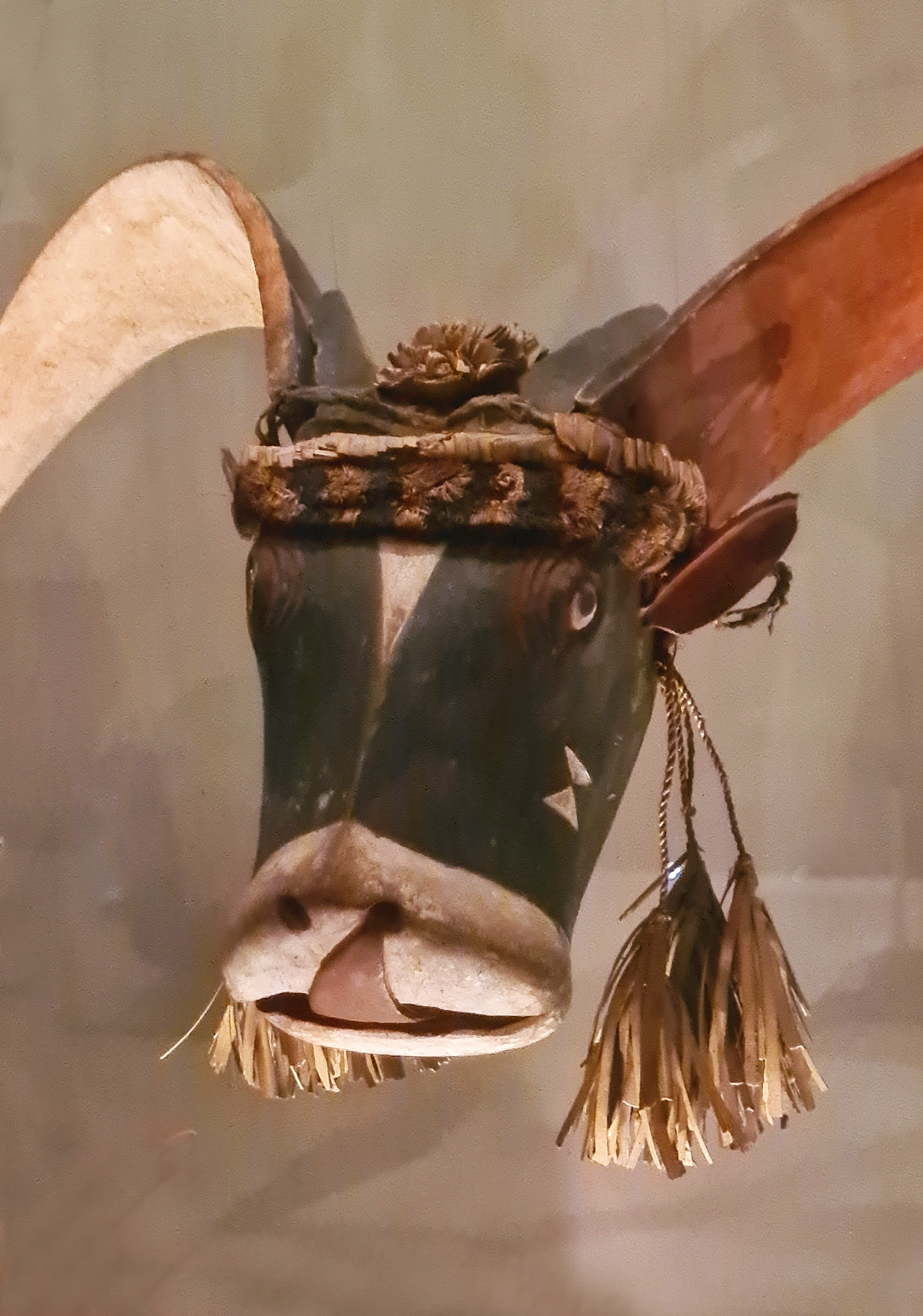
Bijago mask in the form of a buffalo, British Museum

The Bijagós peoples produce many artifacts for daily use and ritual following a traditional iconography that is unique to their culture, and shows variations from island to island. Among the most striking Bidyogo art pieces are the portable ancestor shrines ("iran") and the zoomorphic masks representing cows ("vaca-bruta"), sharks, stingrays and, occasionally, other local animals. Traditionally-decorated artifacts are also produced for "fanado" coming-of-age ceremonies (wood masks, spears, shields, headgear, bracelets), daily activities (fishing, agriculture) and personal use (stools, basketry, foodware). Its unique aesthetics make Bidyogo art easily distinctive from other African tribal arts.

== Education ==
A high school on the islands is Bubaque High School.

Elementary students began studying in both Kriol and Portuguese in 1986. Prior to 2008, the idea was that high school students studied only in Portuguese, with students advancing away from Kriol and towards Portuguese, but that year Kriol medium education was introduced at the secondary level. Luigi Scantamburlo, an Italian priest, coordinated the bilingual education on the islands. Bilingual education ended in 2022 due to the retirement of the priest.

== Notable people ==
- Benkos Biohó, Former African king who was shipped to Cartagena, Colombia during the slave trade but managed to escape and founded the maroon village known as San Basilio de Palenque.

== See also ==
- List of islands of Guinea-Bissau
- João Vieira and Poilão Marine National Park
