= Richard Hancorn (Royal Navy officer) =

Royal Navy officer (1754–1792)

- Born: c. 1754
- Died: 21 July 1792 (aged 37–38); Bulama (now Bolama Island, Guinea-Bissau)
- Other name: Richard Hancorne
- Military career
- Allegiance: Kingdom of Great Britain
- Branch: Royal Navy
- Service years: 1783–1792
- Rank: Lieutenant
- Commands: HMS Calypso

Richard Hancorn (c. 1754 – 1792) was a British Royal Navy officer, serving during the late eighteenth century.

== Naval career ==
On 15 February 1783, Hancorn was commissioned to the rank of lieutenant aboard the Bonetta-class sloop under the command of William Henry Ricketts. Soon after, he joined HMS Melampus, under the command of Sir Charles Pole, 1st Baronet, who was appointed to the frigate in May 1790 as a result of the Nootka Crisis.

=== Hancorn v. Butterfield ===
Upon joining HMS Melampus, Hancorn provoked the anger of the midshipmen by handing out "harsh and unfair" punishments for minor transgressions. Of particular grievance was his response to the misdemeanour of Midshipman William Butterfield, who was lashed to a grating and pulled to the top of the mizzen in a public display, because he had engaged in his ordinary duties without express permission from a senior officer. As Hancorn expressed, he was "getting under way before he had received his sailing orders." An explosive incident occurred soon after when Hancorn entered the Star & Garter Inn in Portsmouth and was followed by Butterfield and four other midshipmen: Hannam, Hamlin, Parkinson and Trollop, the latter three being from HMS Melampus. Hannam, who was informed of the incident and believed Hancorn a tyrant, immediately initiated in verbally abusing him. The others followed and Hancorn soon found himself challenged to five separate fights. He responded by reminding them of their Naval traditions and that, as a superior officer, such behaviour was "totally reprehensible". Labelled a "rascal", "scoundrel" and "coward", he vacated the situation, prompting a further torrent of insults and hisses.

Hancorn reported the incident to Pole, who reported it to Vice-Admiral Robert Roddam, from whom it was then referred to the Attorney-General. In June 1791, the offending midshipmen were brought to the Winchester Assizes to stand trial. The judge ruled in favour of Hancorn and referred their punishment to the Admiralty, stipulating that the five men deliver a sincere apology to Hancorn, as much to his liking. Although the Navy took no further action, Butterfield quit the Navy in the interim and returned only in 1794, once his superior was dead.

=== Bulama Association ===
In 1792, a group of officers of the Royal Navy led an attempt to resettle Black former slaves from the Americas on the island of Bulama off the coast of Portuguese Guinea. The Bulama Association, a philanthropic and financial organisation of which Hancorn was a member, hoped to create a colony that would remove the need for slave plantations in the Caribbean.

The expedition, which consisted of two ships and two hundred and seventy-five colonists, set sail from England on 14 April 1792. Lieutenant Philip Beaver, president of the council of the colonization society, was commander of HMS Hankey; Hancorn, vice-president, was commander of HMS Calypso. Most of the settlers died and the survivors abandoned the colony in November 1793. Hancorn died on the island weeks after the other leaders had decided to return home, on 21 July 1792.
