= Río Grande de Buba =

River in Guinea-Bissau

Coordinates: 11°35′0″N 15°4′0″W

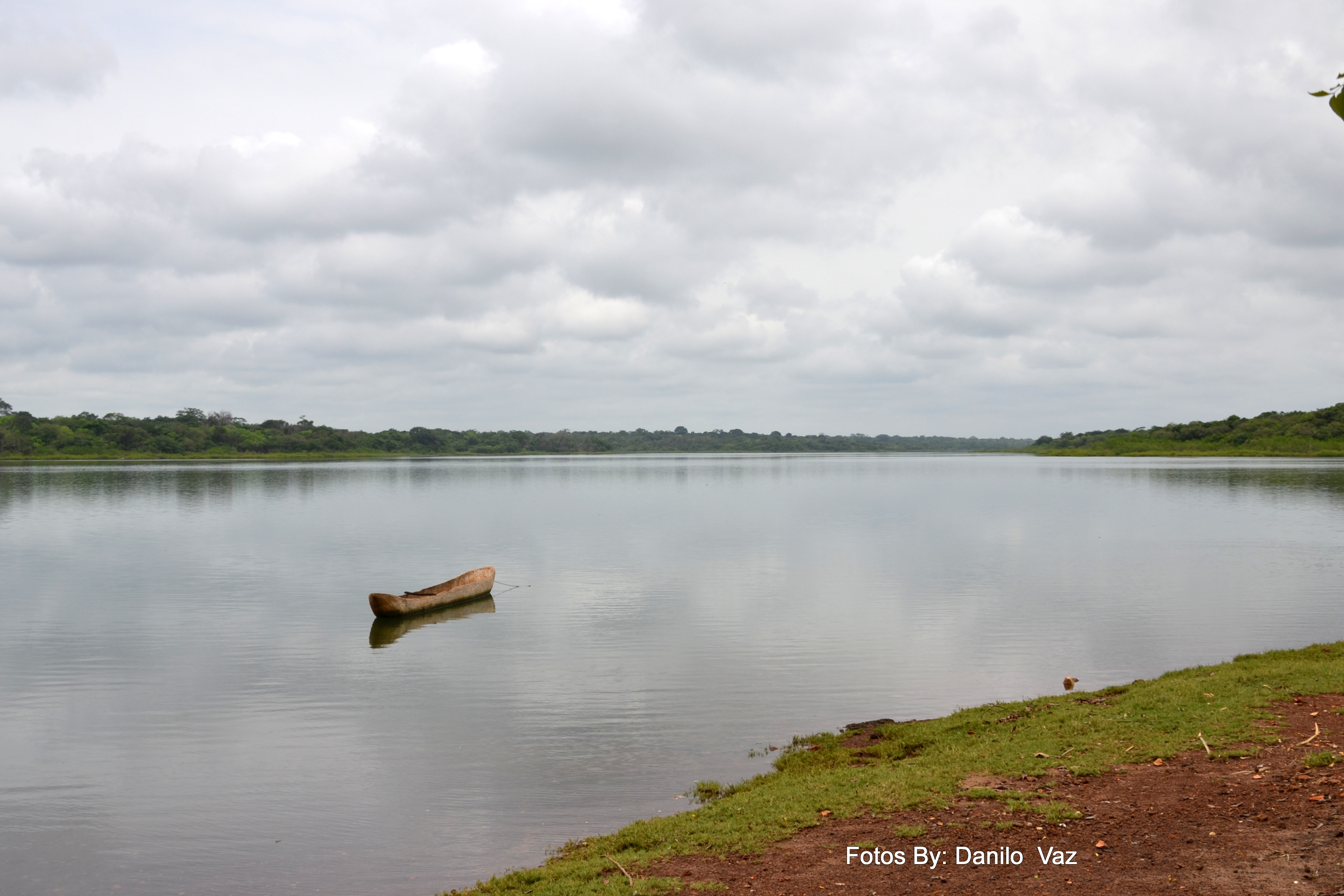
Rio Buba

The Rio Grande de Buba, also called the Rio Buba, Rio Grande, and Grande River, is an estuary of West Africa that is entirely contained within Guinea-Bissau, where it empties into the Atlantic Ocean. It is about 54 kilometres (34 mi) in total length and 4 kilometres (2.5 mi) wide at its mouth. It is an environment unique in West Africa, which has no other example of an arm of the sea extending so far inland, with a downstream depth of around 30 metres (98 ft), and its fauna is extremely rich and diverse.

The Grande was commercially important in the late 16th century, but this soon changed: "Biafada and Mandinka traders along the Geba River and the Papel of Bissau greatly benefited from the precipitous decline of Grande River trade as Bijago raiders increasingly disrupted Biafada and lançado commerce and terrorized Biafada communities along the river."
