= Geba River =

River in West Africa

Geba
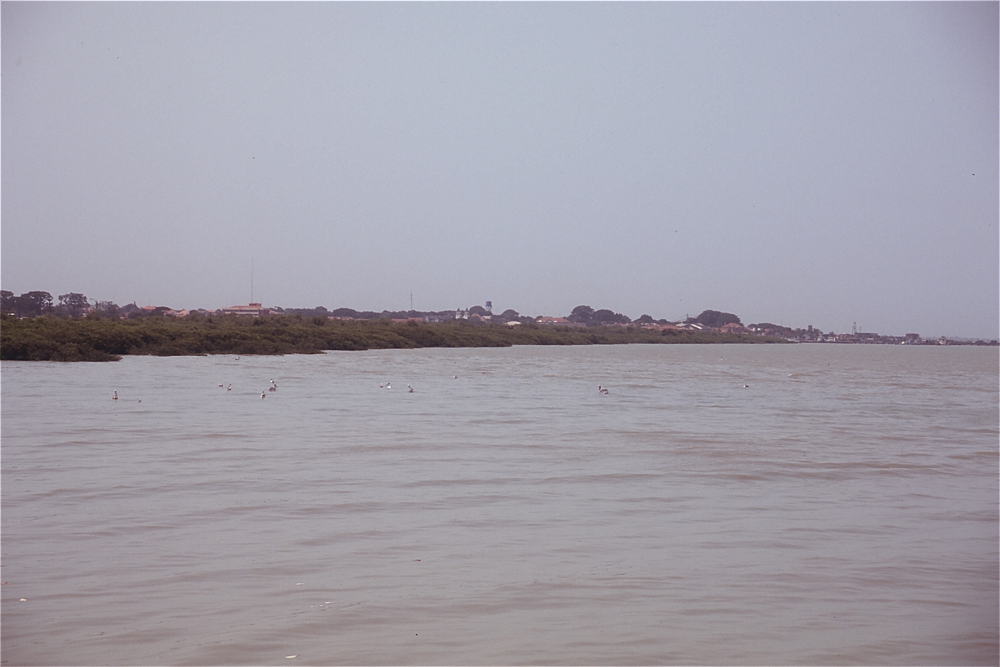
- Geba River in Guinea-Bissau

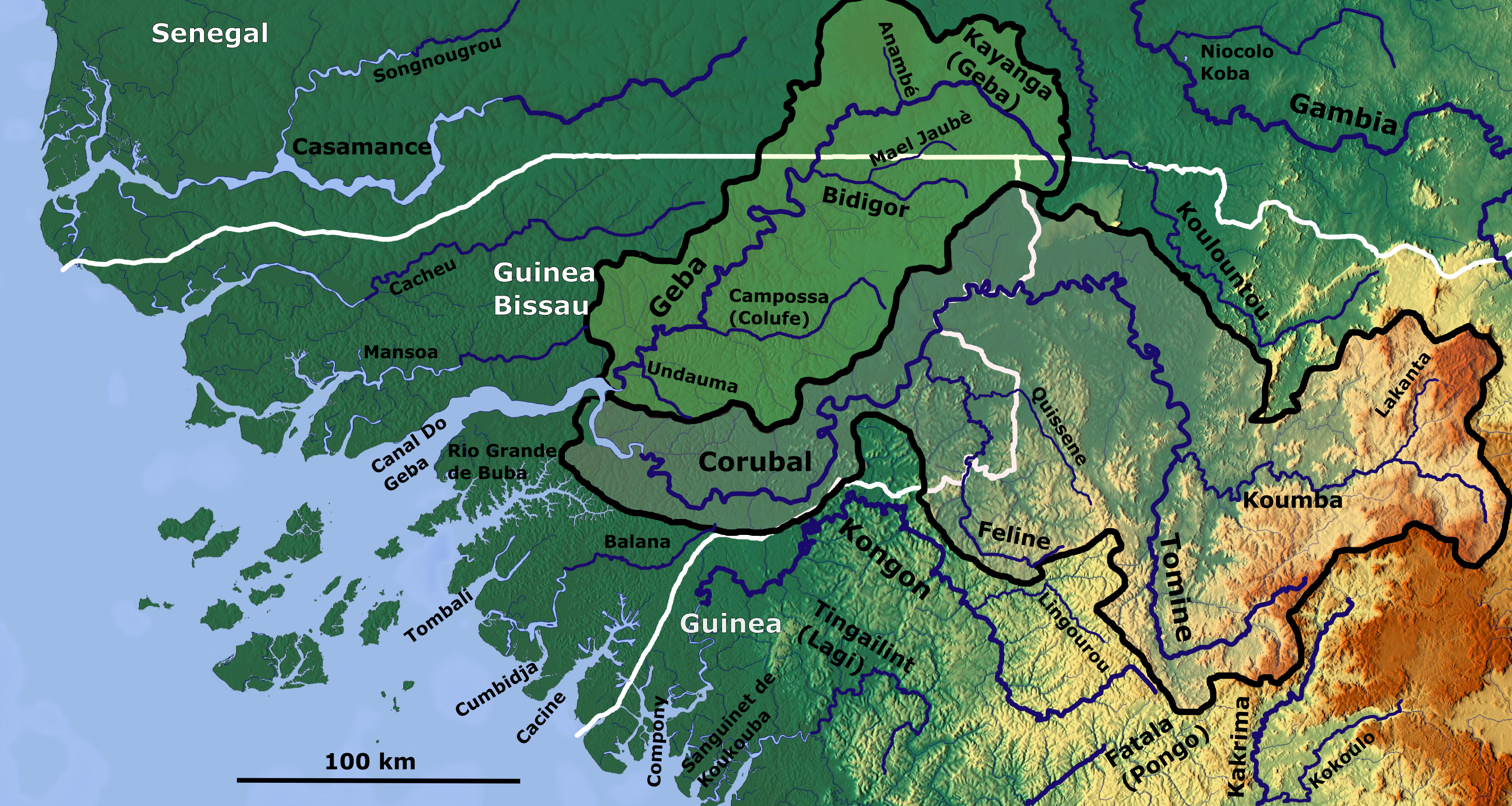
- Map of Senegal, Guinea and Guinea-Bissau with the catchment area of Geba (light green)

Location
- Countries: Guinea; Senegal; Guinea-Bissau

Physical characteristics
- Source
  - location: Fouta Djallon highlands, Guinea
- Mouth
  - location: Atlantic Ocean
  - coordinates: 11°43′20″N 15°38′40″W
- Length: 550 km (340 mi)
- Basin size: 12,440 km^{2} (4,800 mi^{2})

Basin features
- River system: Geba River
- Tributaries
  - left: Bidigor, Colufe, Undauma
  - right: Anambé

The Geba (French: Rivière Geba, Portuguese: Rio Geba) is a river in West Africa. It flows for approximately 550 kilometres (340 mi) through Guinea, Senegal, and Guinea-Bissau. It is also called the Kayanga in Senegal.

== Geography ==
=== Route ===
The Geba rises in the northernmost area of Guinea in the Fouta Djallon highlands, passes through southern Senegal, and reaches the Atlantic Ocean in Guinea-Bissau. It is about 550 kilometres (340 mi) in total length.

It is largely a lowland river, with a higher flow during the rainy season (from June to October). The areas around the lower reaches of the river are floodplains surrounded by savanna and forest, with a high population density based around subsistence farming.

The mouth of the Geba is a wide tidal estuary that is shared with the Corubal River. The tidal range can be as high as 7 metres (23 ft) within the estuary (also called the Geba Channel).

Its tributaries include the Anambe, Gambiel, and Campossa (or Colufe) rivers. The Colufe River joins the Geba at Bafatá. The Geba shares a broad estuary with the Corubal River (which it joins near Xime). Bissau, the capital of Guinea-Bissau is located along the north shore of this estuary. The estuary widens further as the river flows into the Atlantic around the Bijagós Islands archipelago.

=== Watershed ===
The Geba watershed covers approximately 12,000 square kilometres (4,600 sq mi). 65% of the watershed is in Guinea-Bissau, 34% in Senegal, and the small remainder is in the northern corner of Guinea.

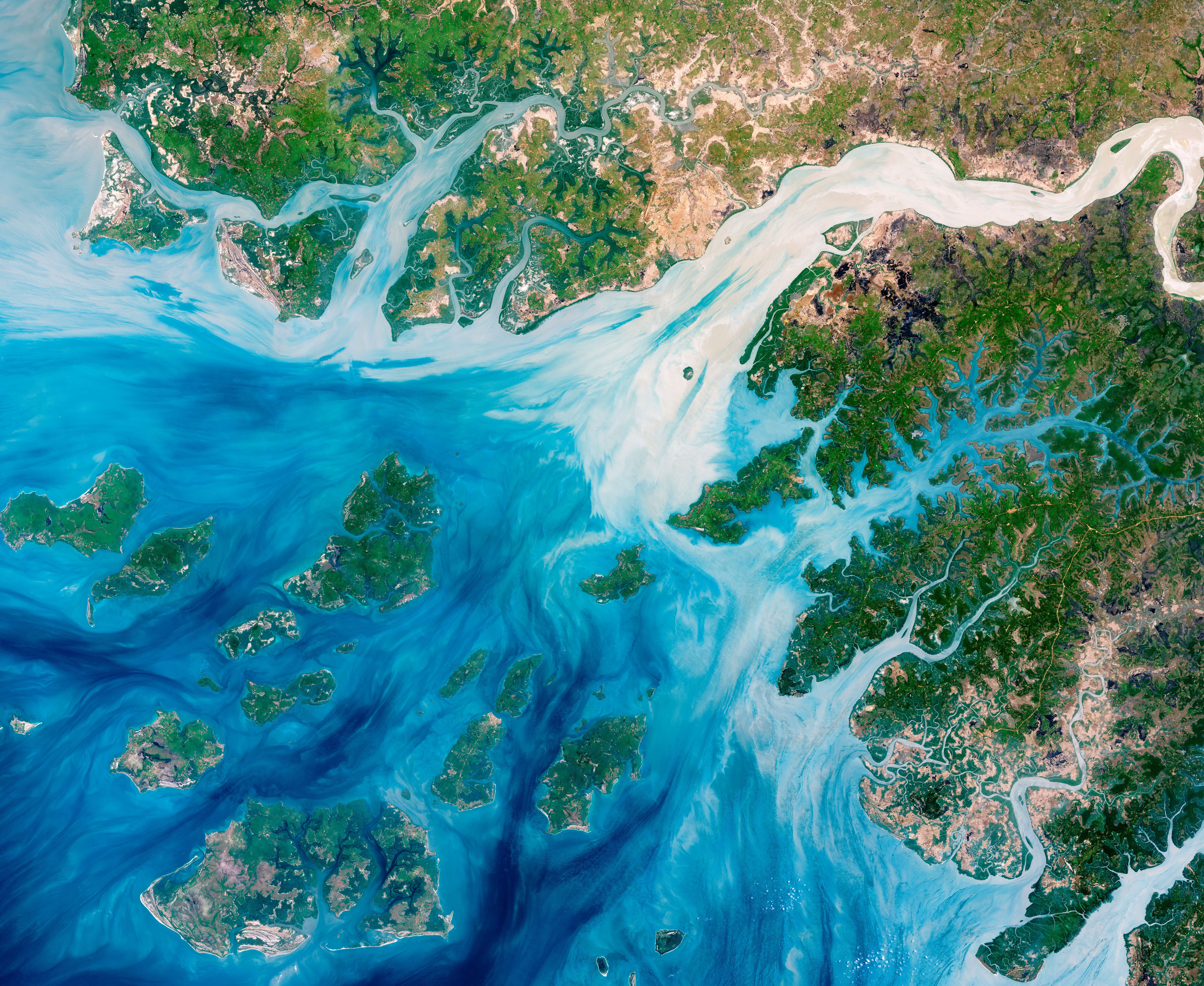
The Geba river estuary is the large light-colored waterway in the top-right of this Landsat 8 satellite image of the Bissau-Guinean coast. The river's color is due to silt. The Bijagós Islands are at the bottom-left, surrounding the mouth of the Geba.

The Geba, along with the Corubal River, drains the Bafatá Plateau. It also drains the Gabú Plain, along with the Farim River (also known as the Cacheu River), and their tributaries.

== Economy ==
The Geba has long been an important trade route connecting into the interior; it is accessible to 2,000-ton ships some 140 kilometres (87 mi) in, and shallow-draft vessels even further.

The town of Geba, located along the navigable portion of the river, served as a major trading post. It connected Soninke, Mandé, Kaabu, and Biafada trading routes. Geba was involved in the Atlantic slave trade. Kola nuts, metals, and ivory were also traded there.
