= Foreign relations of Guinea-Bissau =

The Republic of Guinea-Bissau follows a nonaligned foreign policy and seeks friendly and cooperative relations with a wide variety of states and organizations. France, Portugal, Angola, Brazil, Egypt, Nigeria, Libya, Cuba, Palestine, Ghana, and Russia have diplomatic offices in Bissau.

== Diplomatic relations ==
List of countries which Guinea-Bissau maintains diplomatic relations with:

#	Country	Date
1	Hungary	15 June 1973
2	Russia	30 September 1973
3	Vietnam	30 September 1973
4	Cuba	1 October 1973
5	Poland	3 October 1973
6	Panama	16 October 1973
7	Czech Republic	19 October 1973
8	Romania	16 November 1973
9	Guinea	12 February 1974
10	Liberia	20 February 1974
11	China	15 March 1974
12	North Korea	16 March 1974
13	Serbia	10 May 1974
14	Algeria	13 May 1974
15	Bulgaria	2 June 1974
16	Egypt	11 June 1974
17	Libya	4 July 1974
18	Democratic Republic of the Congo	19 July 1974
19	Japan	1 August 1974
20	Gambia	10 August 1974
21	Mauritania	10 August 1974
22	Senegal	10 August 1974
23	Chile	23 August 1974
24	India	8 September 1974
25	Argentina	9 September 1974
26	Kuwait	6 November 1974
27	Albania	15 November 1974
28	Brazil	22 November 1974
29	Portugal	29 November 1974
30	Nigeria	1974
31	Pakistan	1974
32	Sierra Leone	28 January 1975
33	Spain	3 March 1975
34	United Kingdom	12 March 1975
35	Sweden	14 March 1975
36	Norway	7 April 1975
37	Cape Verde	5 July 1975
38	France	15 July 1975
39	Germany	9 August 1975
40	Netherlands	13 August 1975
41	United States	3 September 1975
42	Mongolia	14 October 1975
43	Iraq	9 December 1975
44	Turkey	1975
45	Canada	26 March 1976
46	Mozambique	9 June 1976
47	Austria	15 October 1976
48	Philippines	26 October 1976
49	Belgium	2 August 1977
50	Israel	18 May 1978
51	Finland	1 May 1979
52	Ivory Coast	9 October 1979
53	Luxembourg	7 December 1979
54	Mali	1980
55	Tunisia	1980
56	Uganda	1980
57	Burkina Faso	18 August 1981
58	Grenada	4 December 1981
59	Italy	15 December 1982
60	Switzerland	22 February 1983
61	Bangladesh	15 March 1983
62	Mexico	23 March 1983
63	Denmark	26 May 1983
64	Thailand	6 December 1983
65	South Korea	22 December 1983
66	Saudi Arabia	1983
67	Tanzania	1984
68	Morocco	27 February 1986
—	Holy See	12 July 1986
69	Peru	29 September 1986
70	Colombia	23 March 1989
—	State of Palestine	13 November 1989
71	Iran	22 August 1990
72	Qatar	27 July 1992
73	Oman	5 August 1992
74	Azerbaijan	27 August 1992
75	Armenia	3 September 1992
76	Brunei	3 June 1994
77	South Africa	11 October 1994
78	Costa Rica	28 March 1995
79	Bosnia and Herzegovina	18 October 1995
80	Croatia	19 October 1995
81	Singapore	1 July 1996
82	Ecuador	10 December 1996
83	Indonesia	12 December 1996
84	Slovenia	24 July 1997
85	Slovakia	8 October 1997
86	North Macedonia	29 June 2000
87	Malaysia	2000
88	Timor-Leste	20 May 2002
89	Belarus	27 September 2002
90	Iceland	24 September 2004
91	Venezuela	6 April 2006
92	Montenegro	29 June 2006
93	Angola	8 January 2007
94	Dominican Republic	27 September 2007
95	Estonia	8 December 2007
96	Cyprus	20 May 2008
97	Ukraine	22 February 2009
98	Botswana	22 March 2010
99	Uruguay	26 March 2010
100	Cambodia	30 June 2010
101	Georgia	9 March 2011
102	Australia	14 March 2011
103	Kazakhstan	19 April 2013
104	Fiji	7 July 2014
105	Ethiopia	21 June 2017
—	Kosovo	10 June 2018
106	Equatorial Guinea	22 November 2018
107	United Arab Emirates	28 June 2019
108	Kenya	7 January 2020
109	Lebanon	20 October 2020
110	Niger	10 February 2021
111	Rwanda	27 April 2021
112	Zimbabwe	27 April 2021
113	Latvia	14 July 2021
114	Lithuania	21 September 2021
115	Republic of the Congo	25 November 2021
116	Ireland	25 November 2021
117	Andorra	5 April 2022
118	Monaco	17 May 2022
119	Maldives	23 September 2022
120	Benin	10 November 2022
121	Myanmar	6 March 2023
122	Paraguay	13 July 2023
123	Sri Lanka	6 December 2023
124	Ghana	7 December 2023
125	Namibia	8 December 2023
126	Jordan	3 March 2024
127	Madagascar	30 July 2024
128	Tajikistan	27 September 2024
129	Chad	17 January 2025
130	Kyrgyzstan	6 February 2025
131	Togo	28 March 2025
132	Burundi	22 October 2025
133	Moldova	17 March 2026
134	Uzbekistan	22 April 2026
135	Nepal	1 September 2026
136	Gabon	Unknown
137	Greece	Unknown
138	São Tomé and Príncipe	Unknown

== Bilateral relations ==
Country	Formal Relations Began	Notes
Angola		Angola has an embassy in Bissau.; Guinea-Bissau has an embassy in Luanda.
Brazil	22 November 1974	See Brazil–Guinea-Bissau relations: Both countries established diplomatic relations on 22 November 1974.; Brazil has an embassy in Bissau.; Guinea-Bissau has an embassy in Brasília.; Both countries are members of Community of Portuguese Language Countries.
Cape Verde	5 July 1975	See Cape Verde–Guinea-Bissau relations Both countries established diplomatic relations on 5 July 1975 The Republic of Cape Verde islands are about 900 km north-west of Guinea-Bissau. Both were colonies of the Portuguese Empire and they campaigned together for independence with a plan for unification, but the countries separated after 1980.: Cape Verde has an embassy in Bissau.; Guinea-Bissau has an embassy in Praia.
China	15 March 1974, broken 31 May 1990, Restored 23 April 1998	See China–Guinea-Bissau relations: China has an embassy in Bissau.; Guinea-Bissau has an embassy in Beijing.
Czech Republic	19 October 1973	Both countries established diplomatic relations in 1973 (with Czechoslovakia) and in 1993.; Czech Republic is accredited to Guinea-Bissau from its embassy in Accra, Ghana.
Egypt	11 June 1974	Both countries established diplomatic relations on 11 June 1974: Egypt is accredited to Guinea-Bissau by its embassy in Conakry, Guinea.; Both countries are full member of the African Union.
Hungary	15 October 1973	Both countries established diplomatic relations on 15 October 1973 Hungary is represented in Guinea-Bissau by its embassy in Lisbon, Portugal.
Mozambique	9 June 1976	Both countries established diplomatic relations on 9 June 1976: Guinea-Bissau is accredited to Mozambique from its Ministry of Foreign Affairs in Bissau.; Mozambique is accredited to Guinea-Bissau from its Ministry of Foreign Affairs in Maputo.; Both nations also conduct diplomatic relations from their respective ambassadors accredited to the CPLP in Lisbon, Portugal.
Portugal	10 September 1974	See Guinea-Bissau–Portugal relations Both countries established diplomatic relations on 10 September 1974.: Guinea-Bissau has an embassy in Lisbon and a consulate-general in Albufeira.; Portugal has an embassy in Bissau.
Russia	6 October 1973	See Guinea-Bissau–Russia relations Both countries established diplomatic relations on 6 October 1973.: Guinea-Bissau has an embassy in Moscow.; Russia has an embassy in Bissau.
Senegal	10 August 1974	Both countries established diplomatic relations on 10 August 1974, when the first ambassador of Senegal Saer Gaye presented his credentials to the head of state Luis Cabral: Guinea-Bissau has an embassy in Dakar and a consulate-general in Ziguinchor.; Senegal has an embassy in Bissau.
Serbia	10 May 1974	Both countries established diplomatic relations on 10 May 1974 when Bozidar Stanic, Yugoslav Ambassador to Guinea-Bissau, presented his credentials to President Luis Cabral.; On 8 December 2017, Serbia unilaterally decided to abolish visa for of all types of passports of Guinea-Bissau.; Guinea-Bissau denies to have recognized Kosovo.
Spain	3 March 1975	See Guinea-Bissau–Spain relations Both countries established diplomatic relations on 3 March 1975: Guinea-Bissau has an embassy in Madrid.; Spain has an embassy in Bissau.
Sweden	14 March 1975	See Guinea-Bissau–Sweden relations Both countries established diplomatic relations on 14 March 1975 when Sweden's first Ambassador to Guinea-Bissau, Mr. D. Friedman, presented his credentials to President Louis Cabral.: Guinea-Bissau is accredited to Sweden from its embassy in Brussels, Belgium and maintains an honorary consulate in Stockholm.; Sweden is accredited to Guinea-Bissau from its embassy in Lisbon, Portugal.
Turkey		See Guinea-Bissau–Turkey relations: Guinea-Bissau has an embassy in Ankara.; Turkey has an embassy in Bissau.; Trade volume between the two countries was US$4.95 million in 2019.
Ukraine	12 February 2009	Both countries established diplomatic relations on 12 February 2009: Ukraine is accredited to Guinea-Bissau from its embassy in Dakar, Senegal.
United Kingdom	1975	See Foreign relations of the United Kingdom Guinea-Bissau established diplomatic relations with the United Kingdom on 12 March 1975.: Guinea-Bissau does not maintain an embassy in the United Kingdom.; The United Kingdom is not accredited to Guinea-Bissau through an embassy; the UK develops relations through its embassy in Dakar, Senegal.; The UK governed parts of Guinea-Bissau from 1792 to 1870, when it was transferred to Portugal. Both countries share common membership of the World Trade Organization.
United States	3 September 1975	See Guinea-Bissau–United States relations Both countries established diplomatic relations on 3 September 1975 The U.S. Embassy suspended operations in Bissau on 14 June 1998, in the midst of violent conflict between forces loyal to then-President Vieira and the military-led junta. Prior to and following the embassy closure, the United States and Guinea-Bissau have enjoyed excellent bilateral relations.: Guinea-Bissau is accredited to the United States from its Permanent Mission to the United Nations in New York City.; United States is accredited to Guinea-Bissau from its embassy in Dakar, Senegal.

== See also ==
- List of diplomatic missions in Guinea-Bissau
- List of diplomatic missions of Guinea-Bissau
- Visa requirements for Guinea-Bissauan citizens
