= Guinea-Bissau–Russia relations =

- Guinea-Bissau: Russia

Guinea-Bissau–Russia relations are the bilateral foreign relations between Guinea-Bissau and Russia.

== Soviet-era relations ==
Relations between the Soviet Union and the African Party for the Independence of Guinea and Cape Verde (PAIGC), led by Amílcar Cabral, began in the 50th anniversary year of the establishment of the USSR, and intensified in 1961, when training and arming of the party began. In 1965, the first group of 75 PAIGC leaders began training at a Soviet military school in Perevalne, where they were taught skills in the manufacture and use of explosives and guerrilla tactics.

The Soviet Union and Guinea-Bissau established diplomatic relations on 6 October 1973. In 1973, the Soviets began to supply the PAIGC with Strela-2 ground-to-air missiles for use in its war with the Portuguese. On 21 February 1975, a number of agreements were signed by the two states, covering economic, technical, cultural and scientific co-operation, a trade agreement and an air services agreement. From 1974 to 1983, Soviet Union was the sole supplier of arms to Guinea-Bissau.

After a visit by Amílcar Cabral to Moscow in 1961, the Soviets formally established ties with the armed revolutionary group African Party for the Independence of Guinea and Cape Verde (PAIGC). The Soviets gave weaponry to PAIGC guerrillas, including bazookas, rocket-propelled grenades, AK-47 rifles, and eventually (shortly after the assassination of Amílcar Cabral) Strela-2 missiles. The Soviets also provided guerrilla-warfare training for PAIGC fighters at Perevalne, Ukraine, as well as training for nurses. On February 21, 1975, the Soviets and Bussau-Guineans signed a bilateral accord providing for close ties; as part of the agreement, Aeroflot flew Bissau-Guinean students to the Soviet Union for training and education. Between 1973 and 1992, about 3,000 young Bissau-Guineans studied on scholarships in the Soviet Union; an additional 3,000 scholarships came from Cuba, and 61 from East Germany. Many other such cultural, economic, and technical treaties were signed between the two nations. Soviet-Guinea-Bissau ties weakened after the USSR began to collapse in 1991. The "huge stockpile of Soviet-made weapons and ammunition" in the county fell into the hands of rebels led by Ansumane Mané during the Guinea-Bissau Civil War (1998–1999).

== Diplomatic relations ==
On 31 December 1991, Guinea Bissau recognised the Russian Federation as the successor state of the Soviet Union, after the latter's dissolution. Guinea-Bissau has an embassy in Moscow, and Russia has an embassy in Bissau. Russian citizens and embassy staff were evacuated from Guinea-Bissau in 1998 due to fighting between government and rebel forces. Mikhail Valinsky was appointed Ambassador of Russia to Guinea-Bissau by Russian president Dmitry Medvedev on 1 December 2008. The current ambassador of Guinea-Bissau to Russia is Rogério Araújo Adolfo Herbert, who presented his Letter of Credence to then-President of Russia Boris Yeltsin on 14 August 1997.

== Economic relations ==
In August 2001, Russia forgave eighty percent of Guinea-Bissau's debt, which was reportedly valued at US$178 million.

== Political relations ==
Helbert was held hostage in the embassy in Moscow in January 2005 by students from Guinea-Bissau who were protesting at their stipends not being paid.

On 1 March 2009, João Bernardo Vieira, the president of Guinea-Bissau was assassinated by a group of Guinea-Bissauan soldiers. Russia condemned the assassination, and in noting its solidarity with the views of the African Union, the Russian Ministry of Foreign Affairs stated it is "against the forceful change of power".

In May 2024, Guinea-Bissau's president Umaro Sissoco Embalo was the highest ranking African politician attending Russian Victory Day parade in Moscow.

On February 26, 2025, Russian President Vladimir Putin met with Guinea-Bissau's president Umaro Sissoco Embalo in Moscow, signaling Russia's growing economic and security ties with Africa. Russian tycoon Oleg Deripaska attended the talks, with reports suggesting Russian aluminium giant Rusal was interested in Guinea-Bissau's bauxite resources and infrastructure projects.

== See also ==
- Foreign relations of Russia
- Foreign relations of Guinea-Bissau
- List of ambassadors of Russia to Guinea-Bissau
