= Guinea-Bissau passport =

Travel document

- The front cover of a contemporary Guinea-Bissau passport
- Type: Passport
- Issued by: Guinea-Bissau
- Purpose: Identification
- Eligibility: Bissau-Guinean citizenship

Republic of Guinea-Bissau passports are issued to citizens of Guinea-Bissau to facilitate international travel. A passport is not required for Guinea-Bissau citizens to travel to member states of the Economic Community of West African States (ECOWAS).

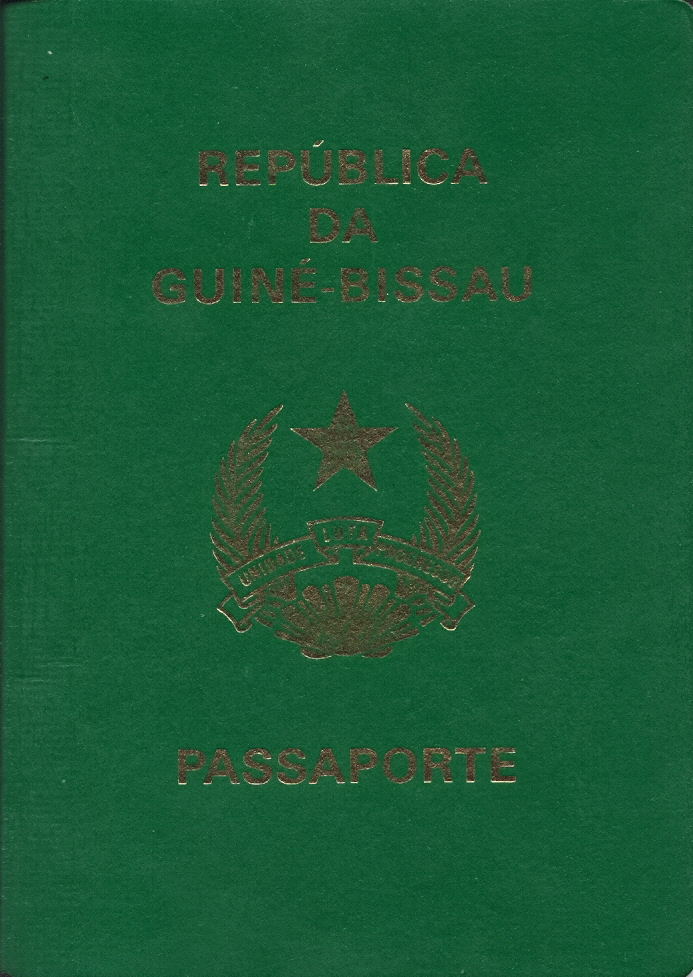
Guinea-Bissau pre-biometric passport

== Types ==
Guinea-Bissau passports come in three forms:

Ordinary passport

- Issued to all citizens of the Republic of Guinea-Bissau for international travel.

Official passport

- Issued to all individual citizens who work for the government and have to travel on official business.

Diplomatic passport

- Issued to diplomats and their family members when they serve overseas.

== Passport cover ==
Guinea-Bissau passports are dark green in color, with the words "Republic of Guinea-Bissau" inscribed on top of the booklet. The Guinea-Bissau coat of arms is emblazoned in the center of the cover page, followed on the bottom by the inscription of the word "PASSAPORTE" on ordinary passports.

== Passport information ==
The given below information is printed on the identification page in Portuguese and English.

1. Type
2. Passport No.
3. Given name(s)
4. Date of birth
5. Sex
6. Place of birth
7. Place of Issue
8. Date of expiry
9. Surname
10. Nationality
11. Residence
12. Date of issue

== See also ==
- ECOWAS passports
- List of passports
- Guinea-Bissau
- Foreign relations of Guinea-Bissau
- Visa requirements for Guinea-Bissauan citizens
