= List of diplomatic missions of Guinea-Bissau =

This is a list of diplomatic missions of Guinea-Bissau. The Republic of Guinea-Bissau follows a nonaligned foreign policy and seeks friendly and cooperative relations with a wide variety of states and organizations, although its actual diplomatic presence is small.

Honorary consulates are not included in this listing.

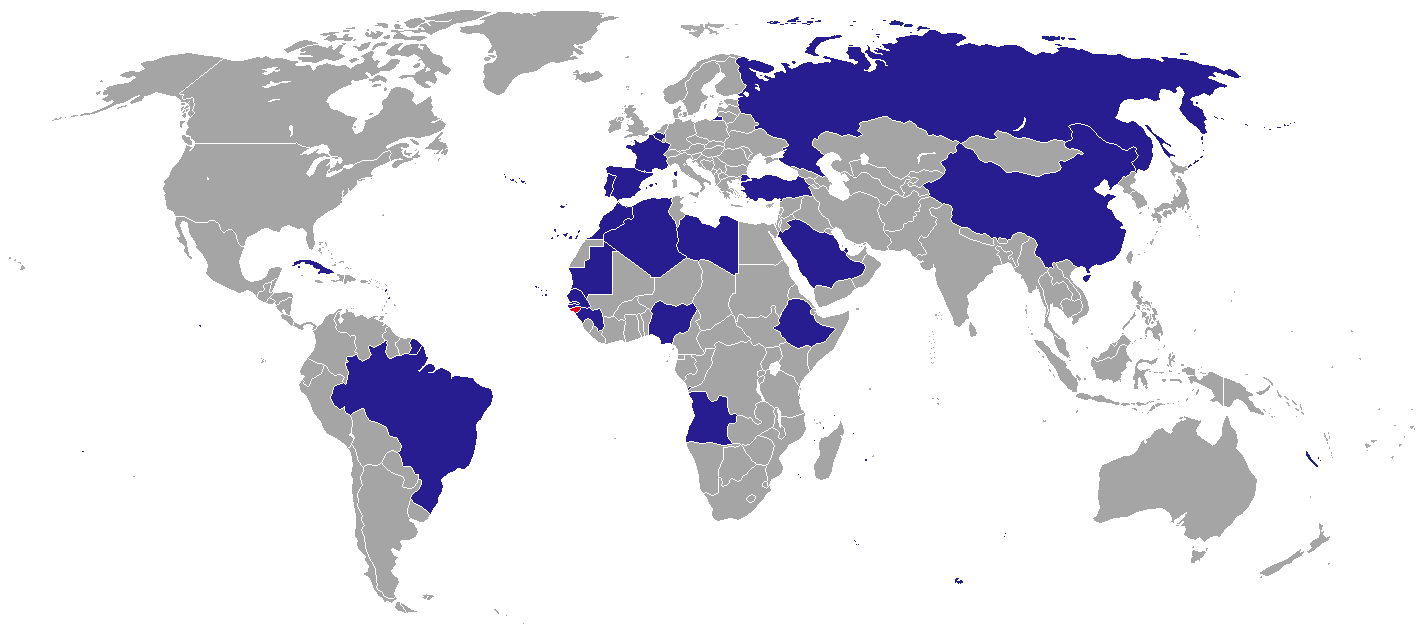
Map of Bissau-Guinean diplomatic missions

== Current missions ==
=== Africa ===
Host country	Host city	Mission	Concurrent accreditation	Ref.
Algeria	Algiers	Embassy	Countries: Tunisia	
Angola	Luanda	Embassy	Countries: South Africa	
Cape Verde	Praia	Embassy		
Ethiopia	Addis Ababa	Embassy	Countries: Rwanda; International Organizations: African Union	
Gambia	Banjul	Embassy		
Guinea	Conakry	Embassy		
Libya	Tripoli	Embassy		
Mauritania	Nouakchott	Embassy		
Morocco	Rabat	Embassy		
Morocco	Dakhla	Consulate-General		
Nigeria	Abuja	Embassy	Countries: Benin; International Organizations: Economic Community of West African States	
Senegal	Dakar	Embassy		
Senegal	Ziguinchor	Consulate-General		

=== Americas ===
Host country	Host city	Mission	Concurrent accreditation	Ref.
Brazil	Brasília	Embassy	Countries: Argentina; Colombia; Uruguay	
Cuba	Havana	Embassy	Countries: Dominican Republic; Panama	

=== Asia ===
Host country	Host city	Mission	Concurrent accreditation	Ref.
China	Beijing	Embassy	Countries: Cambodia; India; Indonesia; Japan; Laos; Malaysia; Myanmar; Philippines; Singapore; South Korea; Thailand; Timor-Leste; Vietnam	
Qatar	Doha	Embassy		
Saudi Arabia	Riyadh	Embassy	Countries: Egypt; Jordan; Oman; United Arab Emirates; International Organizations: Organisation of Islamic Cooperation	
Turkey	Ankara	Embassy	Countries: Azerbaijan	
Turkey	Istanbul	Consulate-General	Countries: Azerbaijan	

=== Europe ===
Host country	Host city	Mission	Concurrent accreditation	Ref.
Belgium	Brussels	Embassy	Countries: Germany; Denmark; Finland; Luxembourg; Netherlands; Slovakia; Sweden; Switzerland; International Organizations: European Union; Organisation for the Prohibition of Chemical Weapons	
France	Paris	Embassy	Countries: Andorra; Holy See; Monaco; United Kingdom; International organizations: UNESCO	
Portugal	Lisbon	Embassy	Countries: Cyprus; Czechia; Hungary; Italy; International organizations: CPLP	
Portugal	Albufeira	Consulate-General	Countries: Cyprus; Czechia; Hungary; Italy; International organizations: CPLP	
Russia	Moscow	Embassy	Countries: Bulgaria; Poland; Serbia	
Spain	Madrid	Embassy		

=== Multilateral organizations ===
Organization	Host city	Host country	Mission	Concurrent accreditation	Ref.
United Nations	New York City	United States	Permanent Mission		

== Gallery ==
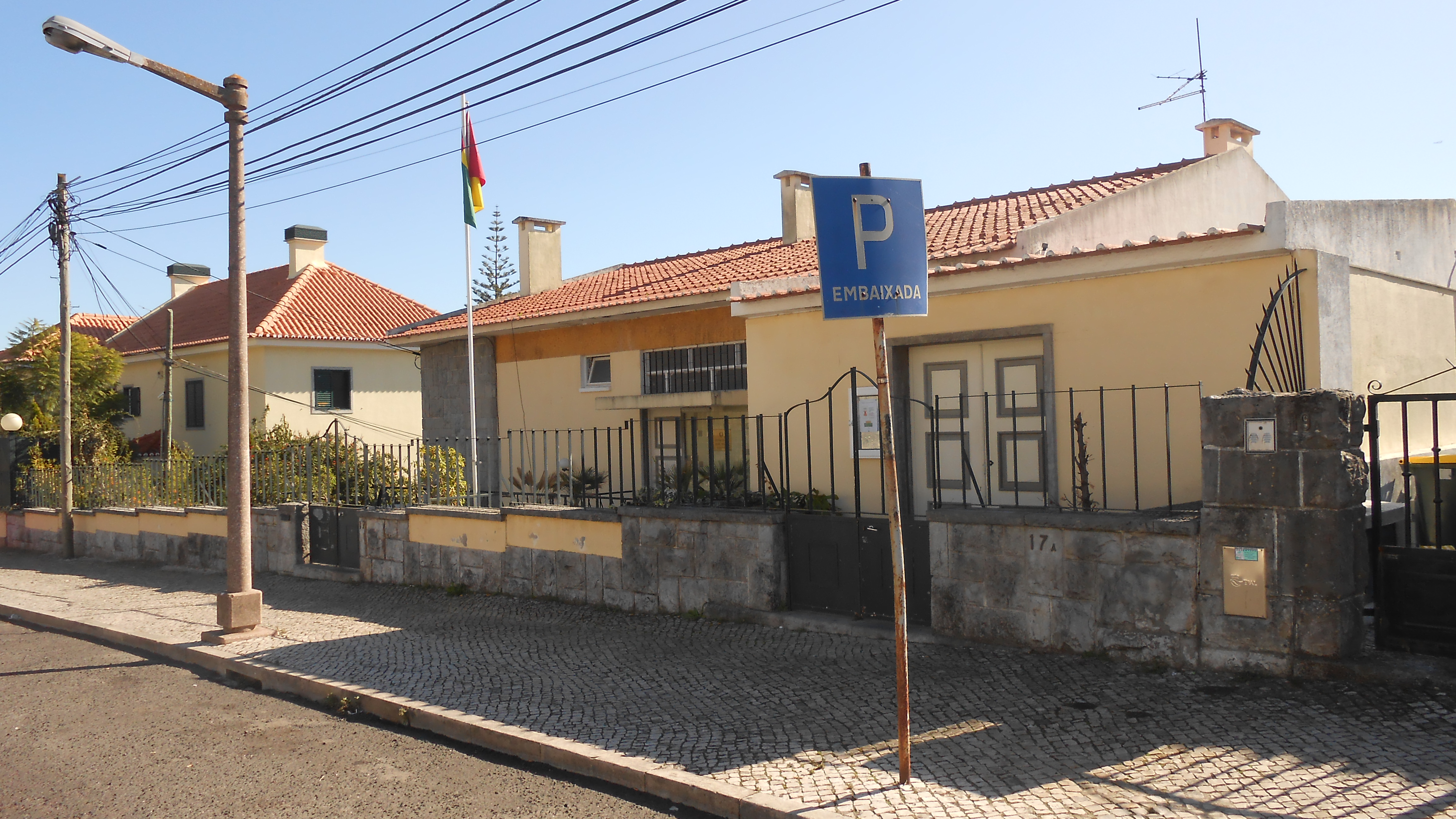
Embassy in Lisbon

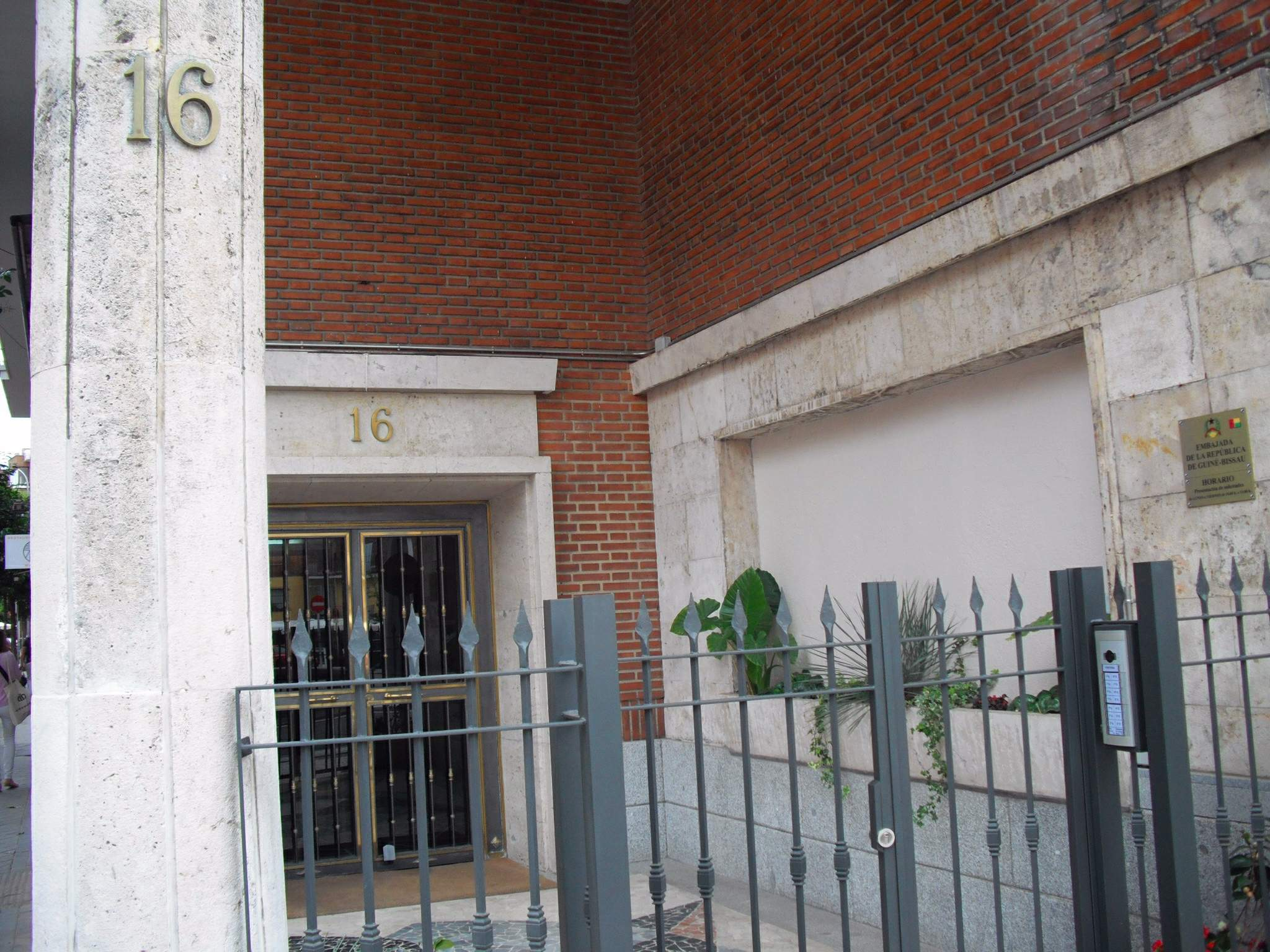
Embassy in Madrid

== Closed missions ==
=== Americas ===
Host country	Host city	Mission	Year closed	Ref.
United States	Washington, D.C.	Embassy	2007	

=== Asia ===
Host country	Host city	Mission	Year closed	Ref.
Indonesia	Jakarta	Embassy	2021	
Iran	Tehran	Embassy	2020	

=== Europe ===
Host country	Host city	Mission	Year closed	Ref.
Germany	Berlin	Embassy	2020	

== See also ==
- Foreign relations of Guinea-Bissau
- List of diplomatic missions in Guinea-Bissau
- Visa policy of Guinea-Bissau
