= Visa policy of Guinea-Bissau =

Policy on permits required to enter Guinea-Bissau

Visitors to Guinea-Bissau must obtain a visa, either on arrival or in advance at one of the Guinea-Bissau diplomatic missions, unless they are nationals of a visa-exempt country.

== Visa policy map ==
Guinea-Bissau Visa exempt Visa on arrival

== Visa exemption ==
Citizens of the following countries can visit Guinea-Bissau without a visa:

- All ECOWAS member states
- Burkina Faso
- Mali
- Niger

Date of visa changes
- 30 April 1980: Economic Community of West African States: Benin, Burkina Faso, Cabo Verde, Ghana, Gambia, Guinea, Ivory Coast, Liberia, Mali, Niger, Nigeria, Senegal, Sierra Leone, Togo

Holders of diplomatic or service passports issued to nationals of Community of Portuguese Language Countries: Angola, Brazil, Cabo Verde, Equatorial Guinea, Mozambique, Portugal, Sao Tome and Principe, as well as Vietnam do not require a visa for an indefinite period of stay.

Guinea-Bissau signed a visa exemption agreement with Serbia for holders of diplomatic, official and special passports in April 2023 and it is yet to enter into force.

== Visa on arrival ==
Citizens of countries that are not visa-exempt must obtain a visa to enter Guinea-Bissau. Visas may be obtained on arrival at Osvaldo Vieira International Airport in Bissau, or at one of four designated land border posts: Djegue II (São Domingos), Cambadju (Bafatá), Pirada and Bruntuma (Gabú). Visas may also be obtained in advance from a Guinea-Bissau diplomatic mission.

Travellers applying for a visa on arrival should have a valid passport or other accepted travel document. Immigration authorities may also require passport photographs, information about the purpose and duration of the visit, accommodation details, onward or return travel information and payment of the applicable visa fee. Visa fees may be payable in West African CFA francs, euros or United States dollars

Travellers residing in a country with a Guinea-Bissau embassy or consulate may apply for the appropriate visa through that diplomatic mission.

== Electronic Visa (e-Visa) ==
Guinea-Bissau introduced an online visa application system through which foreign nationals could apply for visas electronically.

The electronic visa service is currently suspended.

== See also ==
- Visa requirements for Guinea-Bissauan citizens
