= Guinea-Bissau–Turkey relations =

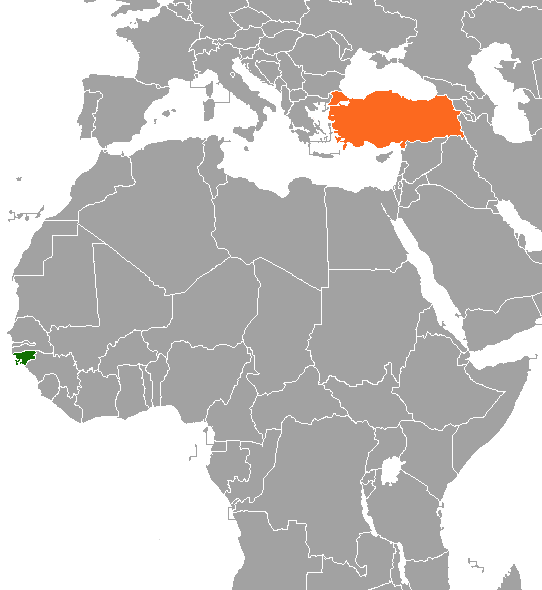

- Guinea-Bissau: Turkey

Guinea-Bissau–Turkey relations are the foreign relations between Guinea-Bissau and Turkey. Turkey has an embassy in Bissau. Guinea Bissau has an embassy in Ankara.

== Diplomatic relations ==
Turkey has helped address Guinea-Bissau's lack of education infrastructure that resulted from Portuguese policies. The Portuguese missão civilizadora, in the words of the Cardinal Manuel Gonçalves Cerejeira in 1960, was to teach the natives to write, to read and to count, but not make them doctors. Turkey—through TIKA—gave extensive assistance in building schools beyond the rudimentary ensinos de adaptação left behind by the Portuguese.

== Economic relations ==
- Trade volume between the two countries was 4.95 million USD in 2019.

== See also ==
- Foreign relations of Guinea-Bissau
- Foreign relations of Turkey
