= Guinea-Bissau–United States relations =

- Guinea-Bissau: United States

Guinea-Bissau–United States relations are bilateral relations between Guinea-Bissau and the United States.

== Historical relations ==
The U.S. Embassy suspended operations in Bissau on June 14, 1998, in the midst of violent conflict between forces loyal to then-President Vieira and the military-led junta. Prior to and following the embassy closure, the United States and Guinea-Bissau had enjoyed excellent bilateral relations.

The U.S. recognized the independence of Guinea-Bissau on September 10, 1974. Guinea-Bissau's Ambassador to the United States and the United Nations was one of the first the new nation sent abroad. The U.S. opened an embassy in Bissau in 1976, and the first U.S. Ambassador presented credentials later that year.

U.S. assistance began in 1975 with a $1 million grant to the UN High Commissioner for Refugees for resettlement of refugees returning to Guinea-Bissau and for 25 training grants at African technical schools for Guinean students. Emergency food was a major element in U.S. assistance to Guinea-Bissau in the first years after independence. Since 1975, the U.S. has provided more than $65 million in grant aid and other assistance.

Since the 1998 war the U.S. has provided over $800,000 for humanitarian demining to a non-governmental organization (NGO) which has removed over 2,500 mines and 11,000 unexploded ordnance from the city of Bissau; $1.6 million in food aid; and nearly $3 million for assistance for refugees, improving the cashew industry, and promoting democracy.

The United States and Guinea-Bissau signed an international military education and training (IMET) agreement in 1986, and prior to 1998, the U.S. provided English-language teaching facilities as well as communications and navigational equipment to support the navy's coastal surveillance program. The U.S. European Command's Humanitarian Assistance Program has assisted with $390,000 for constructing or repairing schools, health centers, and bridges.

The Peace Corps withdrew from Guinea-Bissau in 1998 at the start of the civil war.

In August 2004, sanctions under Section 508 of the Foreign Operations Appropriations Act—which were imposed as a result of the September 2003 military coup—were lifted and Bissau once again became eligible for IMET and other direct aid.

In March 2007, the U.S. and Brazil signed a Tripartite Memorandum of Understanding with Guinea-Bissau highlighting a parliamentary strengthening project first implemented in 2005.

== Political relations ==
In April 2025, four foreign nationals convicted in Guinea-Bissau of trafficking 2.63 metric tons of cocaine were transferred to the United States to face additional charges. The individuals, Ramon Manriquez Castillo (U.S.-Mexican), Edgar Rodriguez Ruano (Mexican), Fernando Javier Escobar Tito (Ecuadorian), and Anderson Jair Gamboa Nieto (Colombian), were sentenced in January 2025 to 17 years in prison following their arrest in a record drug seizure known as Operation Landing. The operation, conducted in September 2024, involved the interception of a Gulfstream IV aircraft from Venezuela carrying 78 bales of cocaine at Bissau’s main airport. The U.S. Drug Enforcement Administration had coordinated closely with Bissau-Guinean authorities, citing the country's lack of high-security detention facilities as a reason for the transfer. President Umaro Sissoco Embaló characterized the handover, conducted under a bilateral agreement despite the absence of an extradition treaty, as evidence of Guinea-Bissau’s commitment to international anti-narcotics cooperation and a departure from its past reputation as a "narco-state". The detainees later appeared in court in Fort Lauderdale, Florida, where they were charged with conspiring to traffic cocaine through several countries, including the United States.

== Diplomatic missions ==
Principal U.S. Officials (resident in Dakar, Senegal) include:

- Ambassador—Marcia Bernicat
- Deputy Chief of Mission—Jay T. Smith

There is no U.S. Embassy in Bissau; likewise, Guinea-Bissau does not maintain any consulate-generals in the United States (except for its Permanent mission to the United Nations in New York). The U.S. Ambassador to Senegal, who is based in Dakar, is accredited as the U.S. Ambassador to Guinea-Bissau. All official U.S. contact with Guinea-Bissau is handled by the U.S. Embassy in Dakar, Senegal. Local employees staff the U.S. Liaison Office in Bissau, and American diplomats from the embassy in Dakar travel frequently to Bissau to conduct normal diplomatic relations.

== See also ==
- Foreign relations of the United States
- Foreign relations of Guinea-Bissau
