= List of diplomatic missions in Guinea-Bissau =

This is a list of diplomatic missions in Guinea-Bissau. At present, the capital city of Bissau hosts 19 embassies.

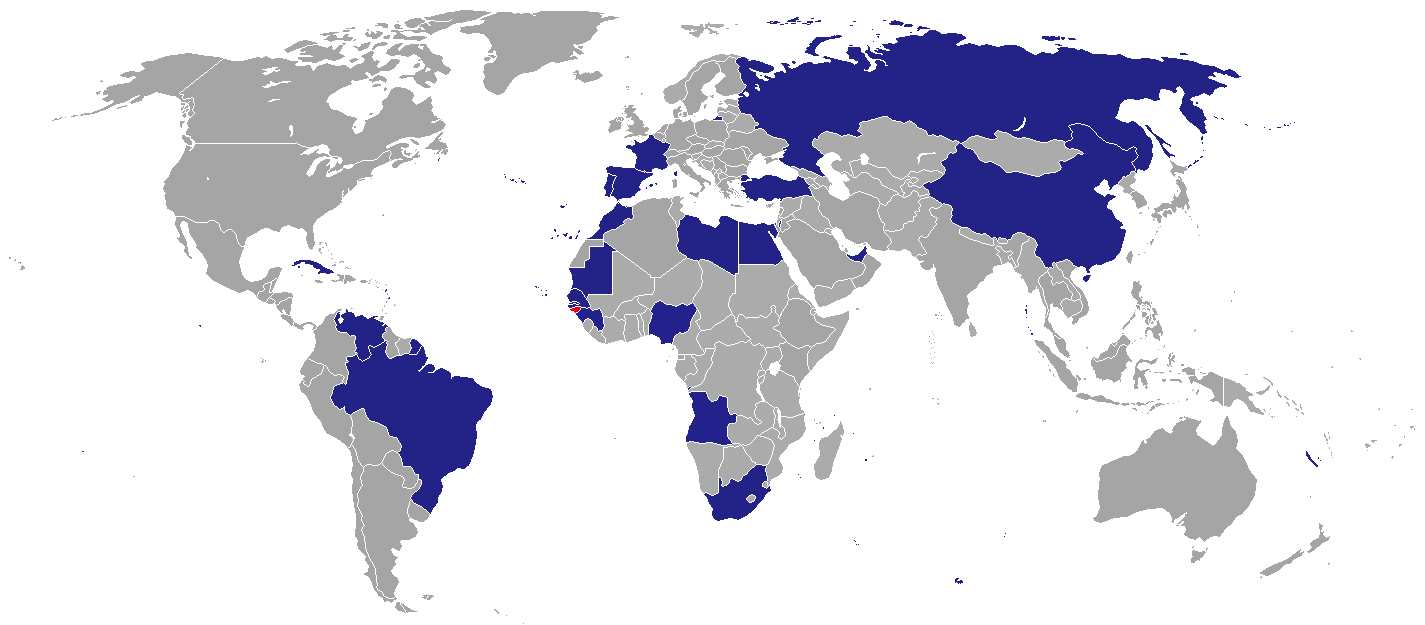
Map of diplomatic missions in Guinea-Bissau

== Diplomatic missions in Bissau ==
=== Embassies ===
1. Angola
2. Brazil
3. Cape Verde
4. China
5. Cuba
6. France
7. Gambia
8. Guinea
9. Libya
10. Mauritania
11. Morocco
12. Nigeria
13. Portugal
14. Russia
15. Senegal
16. South Africa
17. Spain
18. Turkey
19. United Arab Emirates
20. Venezuela

=== Other missions or delegations ===
- European Union (Delegation)
- Germany (Liaison office)
- Palestine (Embassy office)

== Gallery ==
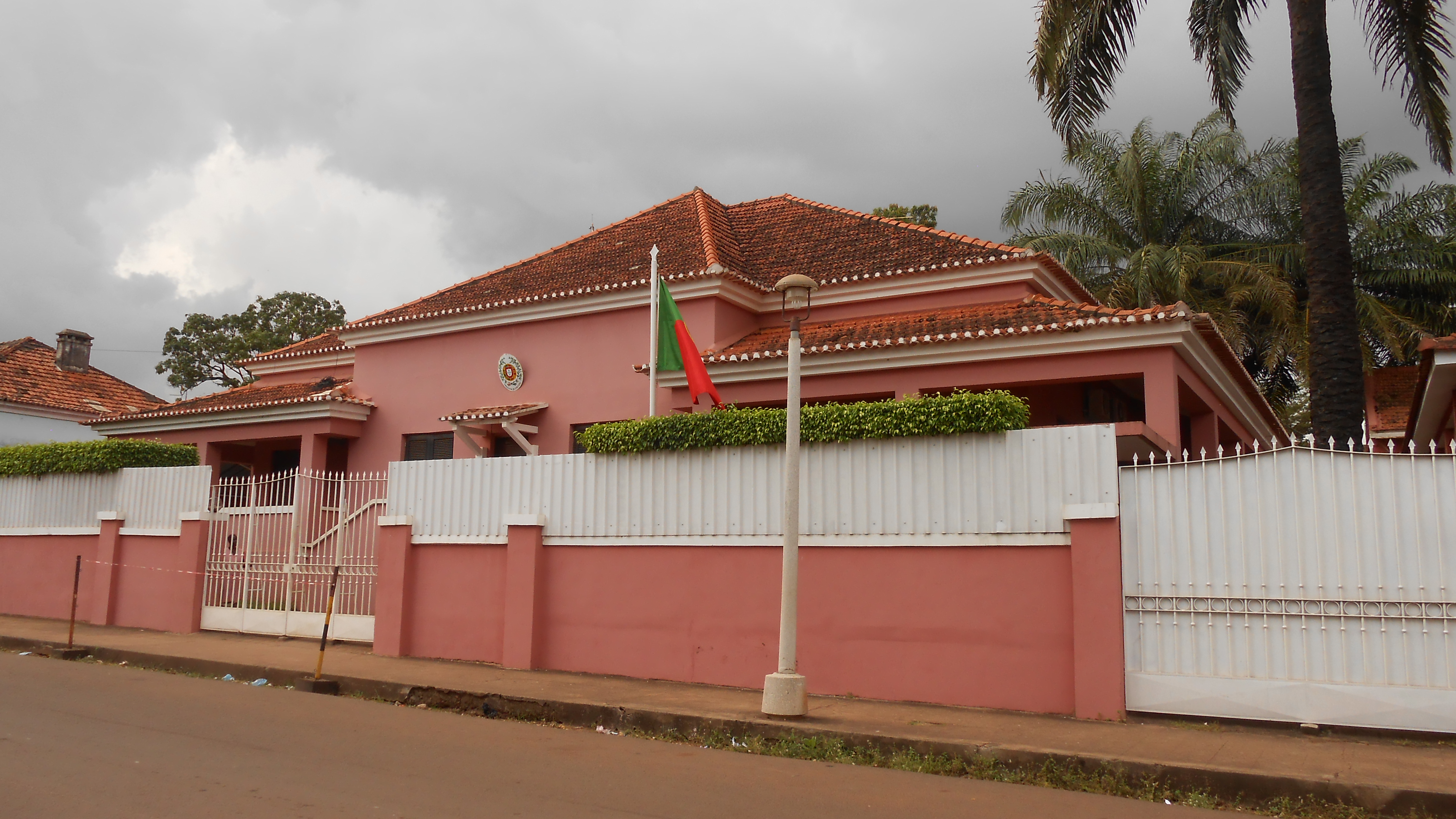
Embassy of Portugal

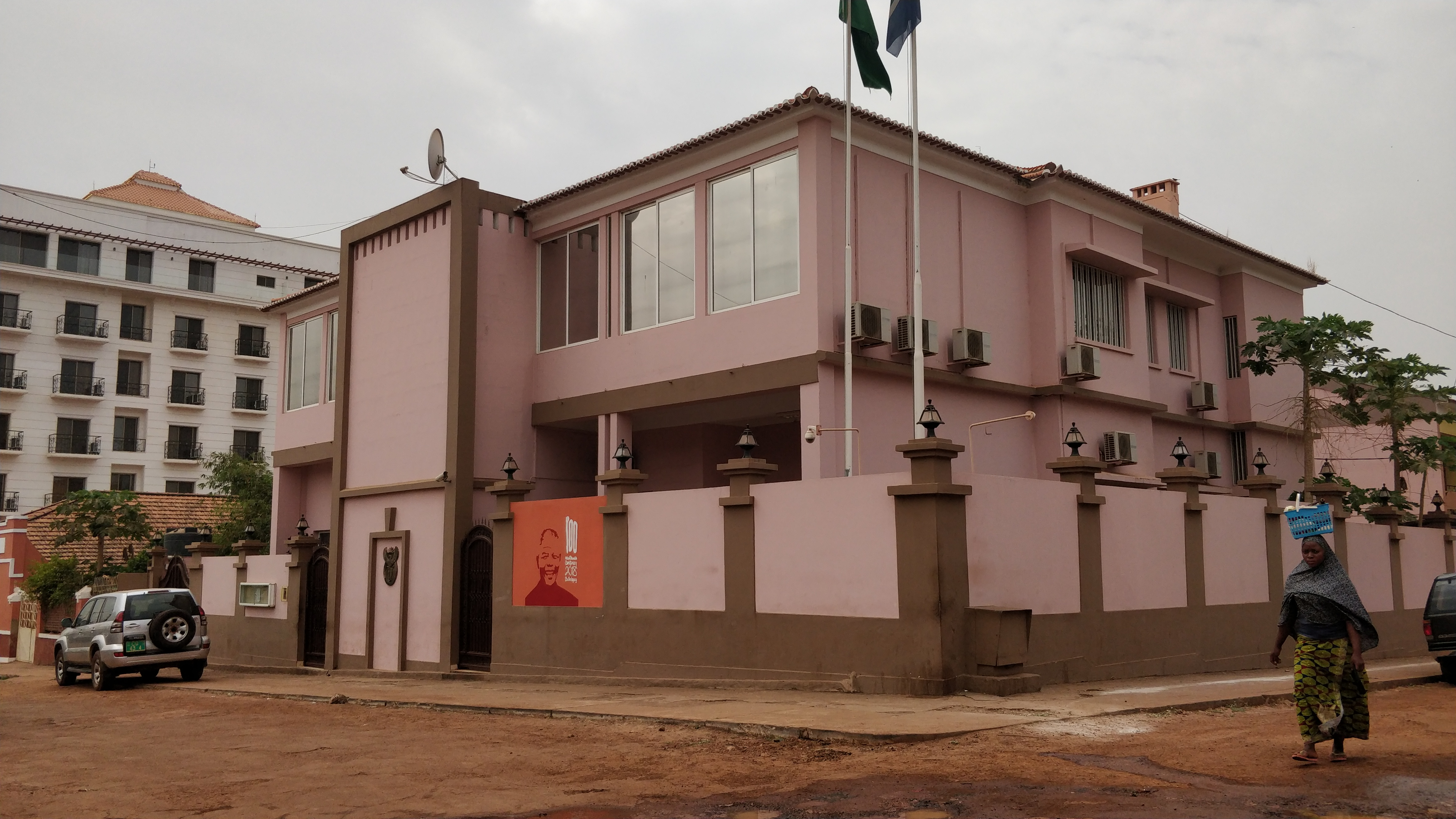
Embassy of South Africa

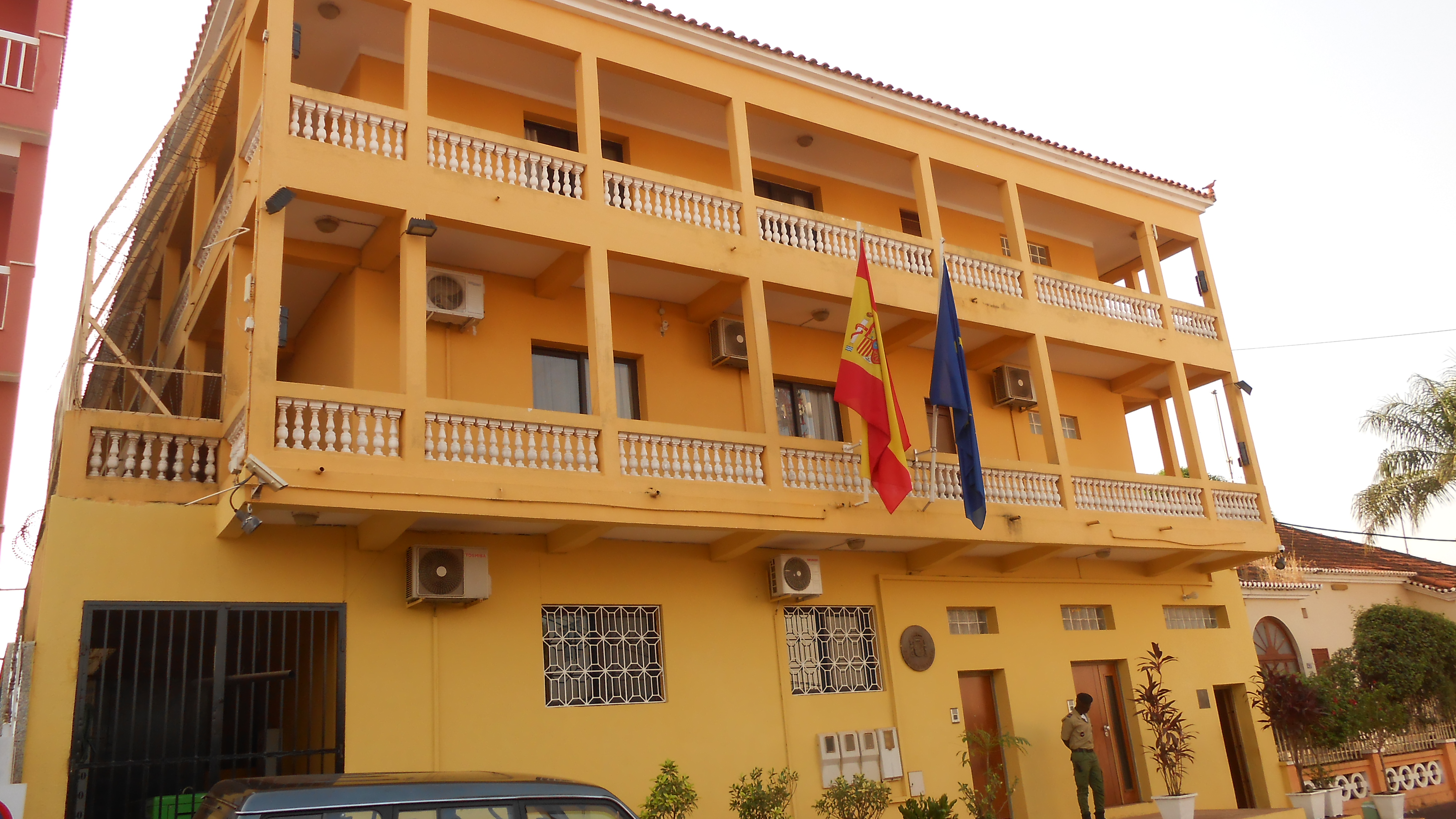
Embassy of Spain

== Non-resident embassies accredited to Guinea-Bissau ==
Resident in Abuja, Nigeria:

- Argentina
- Finland
- São Tomé and Príncipe
- Slovakia
- Tanzania

Resident in Conakry, Guinea:

- Egypt
- Iran
- Lebanon
- Malaysia
- Saudi Arabia
- Sierra Leone

Resident in Dakar, Senegal

- Algeria
- Austria
- Belgium
- Cameroon
- Canada
- Colombia
- Czechia
- Germany
- Indonesia
- India
- Israel
- Italy
- Iraq
- Japan
- Kenya
- Kuwait
- Mali
- Netherlands
- Oman
- Poland
- Romania
- South Korea
- Switzerland
- Thailand
- Tunisia
- United Kingdom
- United States
- Zimbabwe

Resident in Lisbon, Portugal:

- Australia
- Bangladesh
- Croatia
- Denmark
- Equatorial Guinea
- Ireland
- Norway
- Panama
- Philippines
- Sweden

Resident in Rabat, Morocco

- Bahrain
- Greece
- Jordan
- Mexico
- Vietnam

Resident in other cities:

- Afghanistan (Paris)
- Haiti (Paris)
- Maldives (London)
- New Zealand (Paris)
- Serbia (Algiers)
- Yemen (Nouakchott)

== Closed missions ==
Host city	Sending country	Mission	Year closed	Ref.
Bissau	North Korea	Embassy	1991	
Bissau	USA	Embassy (Note: Resident in Dakar, Senegal)	1998	
Bissau	Sweden	Embassy	1999	

== See also ==
- Foreign relations of Guinea-Bissau
- List of diplomatic missions of Guinea-Bissau
