= Guinea-Bissau–Spain relations =

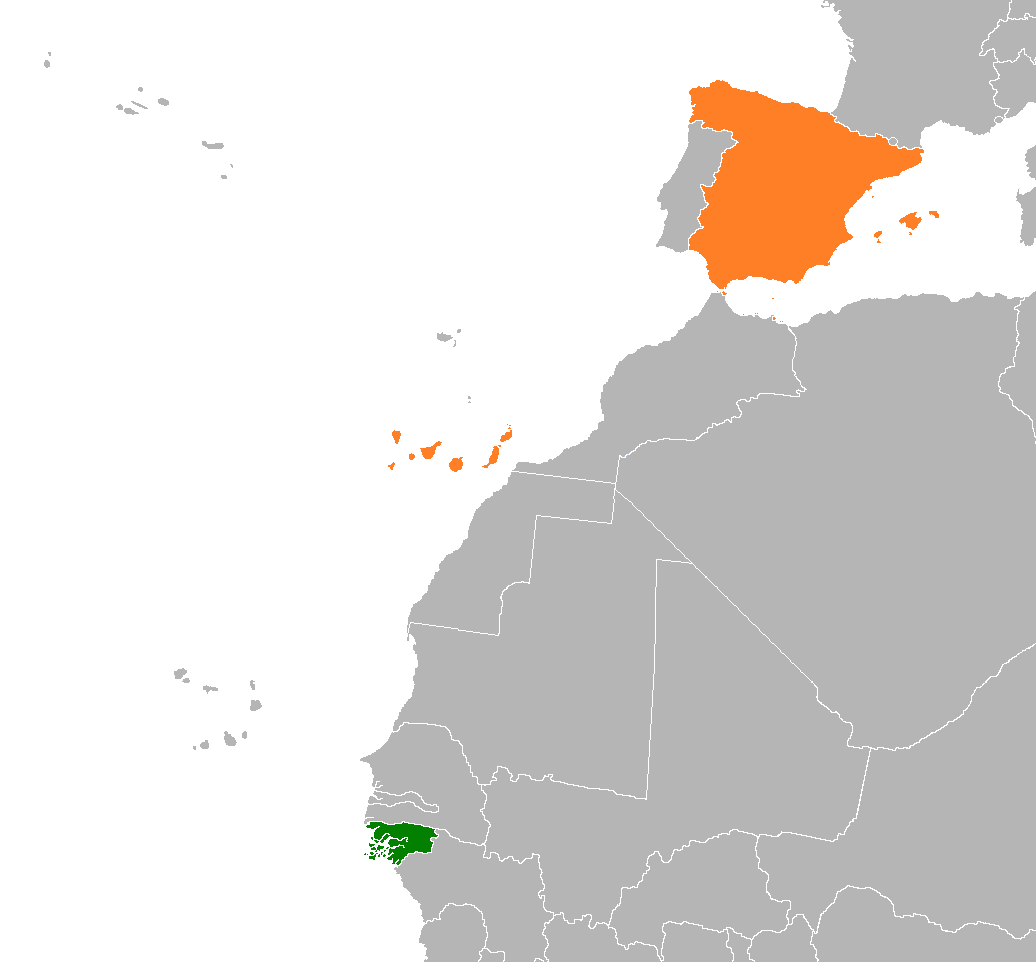

- Guinea-Bissau: Spain

Guinea-Bissau–Spain relations are the bilateral and diplomatic relations between these two countries.

== Independence war ==
In the November 14, 1972, at the United Nations General Assembly vote to recognize the PAIGC as the sole legitimate representative of the people of Guinea-Bissau and Cape Verde, Spain was one of the member states that voted against the resolution. The proposal was adopted with 98 votes in favour, 6 votes against and 8 abstentions. Again at the UN General Assembly on November 2, 1973, following the declaration of independence of Guinea-Bissau, Spain was one of 7 member states voting against the resolution that condemned Portuguese occupation of territories of the Republic of Guinea-Bissau (the resolution was passed with 93 votes in favour).

== Diplomatic relations ==
Spain soon recognized Guinea Bissau the Carnation Revolution, establishing diplomatic relations. After the opening of the Spanish Embassy in Bissau in the year 2007, the ties strengthened. Guinea-Bissau has appointed an Ambassador resident in Madrid, who presented his credentials to King Juan Carlos I at the beginning of 2012.

The most relevant bilateral issues are: Immigration: During the visit of Minister Moratinos on January 27, 2008, a new Generation Migration Cooperation Agreement was signed. These authorities have been cooperating without any problem in the field of repatriations and detentions of immigrants and intermediaries who prepare exit operations. It is true that there are not many immigrants who leave Guinea Bissau However, since Frontex was installed in Senegal, immigrants moved to this country. In 2010, the "Seahorse" program began to operate. This program, financed with European funds and executed by the Civil Guard, has been extended and renamed Project WEST-SAHEL, and has a Spanish Civil Guard officer displaced in Bissau. This is a satellite communications program, which is already working, in Senegal, Mauritania and Cape Verde. It has a technical support installed in Madrid, and the Spanish Civil Guard conducts training courses for Báuguinean officials. It serves to have real-time information of clandestine vessels bound for the Canary Islands, among other achievements, in addition to helping border and immigration control in Guinea Bissau.

The Embassy has an Interior Attaché that is very useful in this area. Fishing: The Fishing Protocol signed with the EU in January 2015 as already been mentioned. Until now, the only fishing licenses issued for vessels from Member States have been issued to Spanish fishing vessels.

In May 2021, Spain wrote off €10 million debt to Guinea Bissau, within the frame of an agreement aimed at deepening bilateral relations.

For the first working visit of head of state of Guinea Bissau to Spain, Bissau-Guinean president Umaro Sissoco Embaló met with Spanish prime minister Pedro Sánchez in February 2023. Spanish foreign minister José Manuel Albares had visited Guinea Bissau three weeks before, meeting with his counterpart Suzi Barbosa.

== Economic relations ==
Bilateral relations between Spain and Guinea Bissau in the economic and commercial sphere are reduced. The presence of Spanish companies in Guinea Bissau is still small, however since the opening of the Spanish Embassy and during the period 2008–2012, both thanks to the improvement of economic conditions in the country and the deterioration of business opportunities In Spain, interest in investing in this country grew. Thus, between 2010 and 2012, the Spanish business presence began to make its way with an estimated Spanish direct investment, in companies of Bissauguinean legal constitution.

== Cooperation ==
During the 2007-2011 period, Spain became the country's first bilateral donor along with Portugal. The first Hispanic-Guinean Joint Commission took place in July 2007 in which Spain undertook to grant Guinea Bissau €15 million (between 2007 and 2009). Although in the first three Master Plans (2001-2012) G-B has been listed as a priority country, in the IV Master Plan 2013-2016 it is considered as a country of departure due to criteria of effectiveness and quality of aid, as well as for budgetary reasons.

The topics defined as priorities are health, education, fisheries and water and sanitation. It has been mentioned that, through the EU West Sahel project, there is always a Civil Guard officer in Bissau, who is renewed every 8 months, who cooperates with local law enforcement authorities in the tasks of organizing emigration services and borders.

In the commercial sphere, Spain was designated as a facilitating donor by Guinea Bissau within a program of the Enhanced Integrated Framework (MIM), in the WTO. The cooperation program, endowed with more than $3 million, is intended to improve the country's commercial capabilities and, in particular, to the modernization of customs.

== Resident diplomatic missions ==
- Guinea-Bissau has an embassy in Madrid.
- Spain has an embassy in Bissau.
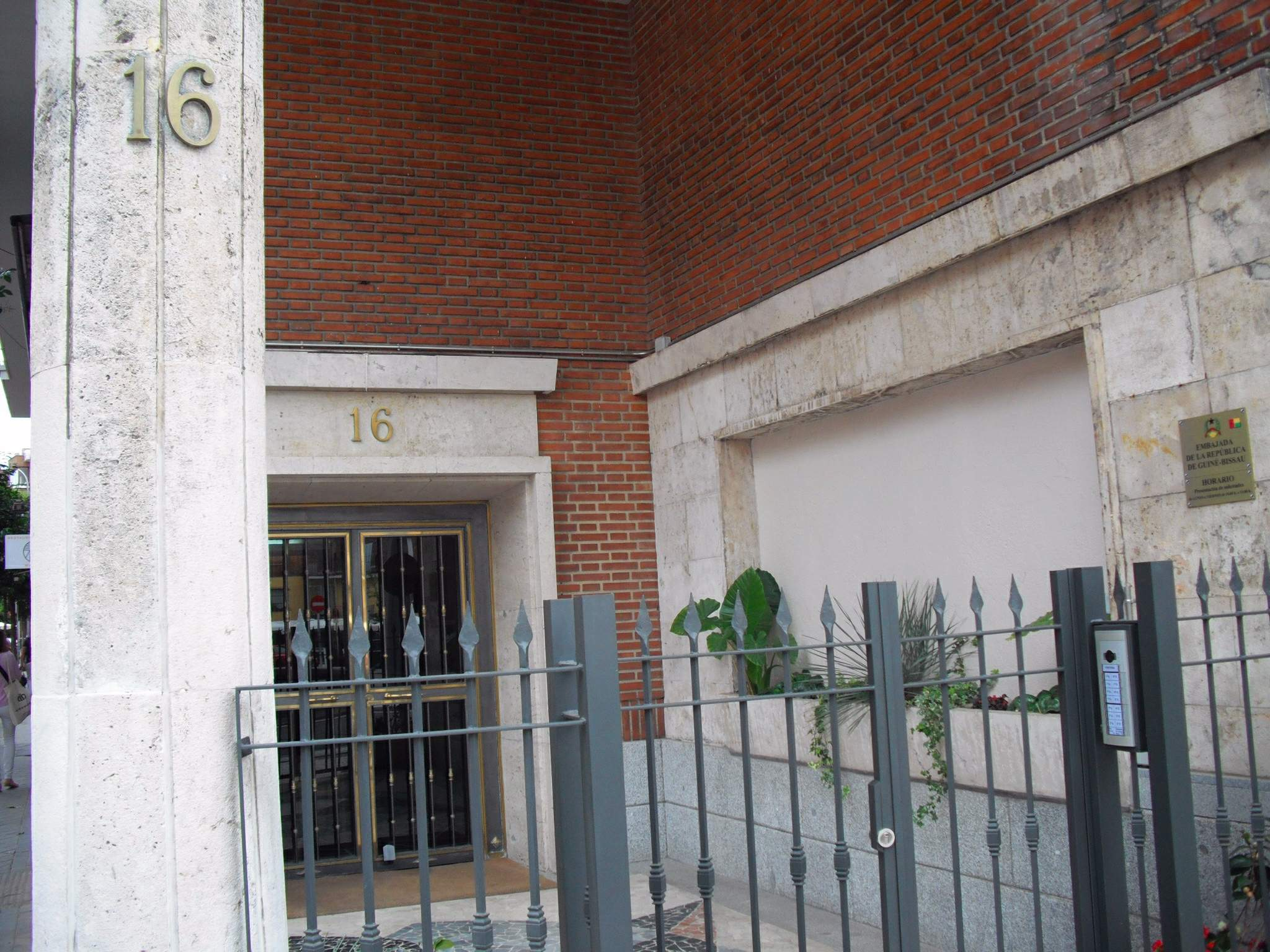
Embassy of Guinea-Bissau in Madrid

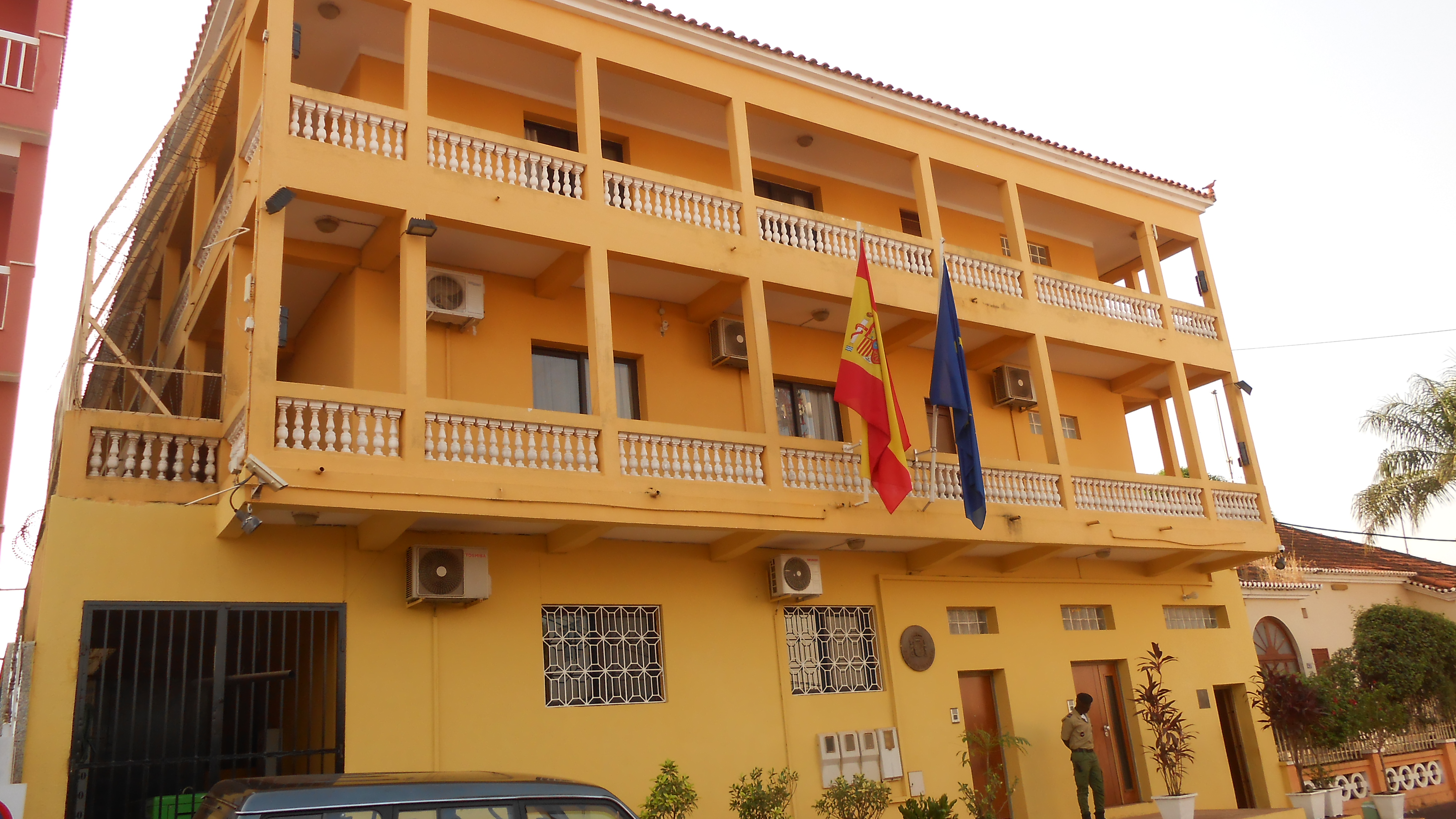
Embassy of Spain in Bissau

== See also ==
- Foreign relations of Guinea-Bissau
- Foreign relations of Spain
