= Guinea-Bissau–Sweden relations =

- Guinea-Bissau: Sweden

Guinea-Bissau–Sweden relations are the bilateral relations between Guinea-Bissau and Sweden. The Swedish ambassador to Portugal is accredited to Guinea-Bissau. Guinea-Bissau is accredited to Sweden from its embassy in Brussels and maintains an honorary consulate in Stockholm.

== Colonial period and liberation war ==
Contacts between Sweden and the area that later became the independent state of Guinea-Bissau were marginal until the late 1960s. Whilst trade relations between Sweden and Portugal increased rapidly after both countries had joined EFTA in 1960, there were few contacts between Sweden and the Portuguese possessions in Africa. The imports from 'Portuguese West Africa' (which in Swedish statistics included Portuguese Guinea, Cape Verde, São Tomé and Príncipe and Angola) represented merely 0.04% of Swedish imports (2.3 million Swedish kronor) in 1950. Exports to 'Portuguese West Africa' amounted to 0.03% (1.8 million kronor) of the total Swedish exports in the same year. By 1960 the Swedish imports from these areas remained at around 0.03% whilst Swedish exports had increased marginally (0.08% of all Swedish exports).

The first African liberation movement to have a comprehensive co-operative programme established with the Swedish government was the African Party for the Independence of Guinea and Cape Verde (PAIGC). The first documented contact between PAIGC and Sweden occurred in the early 1960s, as Amílcar Cabral requested to Swedish journalist Anders Ehnmark to launch an appeal to support the liberation struggle in Guinea-Bissau (after a solidarity campaign of Ehnmark's paper Expressen for Angolan refugees had gathered a large response from the Swedish public). Around 1967 the international secretary of the Swedish Social Democratic Party, Pierre Schori, had visited Portugal. After his return, he urged his party to support PAIGC. From the late 1960s, the two parties developed mutual relations.

In January 1967 a group of parliamentarians from the Communist Party of Sweden (including Lars Werner) had presented a parliamentary motion requesting that Sweden would give assistance to the Mozambiquean liberation movement FRELIMO, but the motion was rejected by the Standing Committee on Foreign Affairs. A year later, the Communist Party issued a similar request (signed by C.-H. Hermansson), requesting that Sweden give assistance to the liberation movements of the Portuguese colonies in Africa, through CONCP (which included PAIGC). This motion was also rejected. In the winter of 1968 Cabral visited Sweden (invited by the Social Democratic Party), the first of many visits. During this visit he also met with Hermansson.

At the time, PAIGC had a resident representative in Sweden, Onésimo Silveira. Silviera would serve in this function until November 1972.

In November 1968 the Swedish government decided to support the UN General Assembly resolution 2395, calling for self-rule for the Portuguese colonies in Africa. Moreover, the Swedish ambassador to Liberia Olof Ripa visited Conakry and sought assurances from Sékou Touré that the Guinean government would not object to official Swedish assistance being channelled through Guinea-Conakry to the PAIGC-held areas.

However, in 1969 not only the communist parliamentarians requested official Swedish support for the anti-colonial movements in the Portuguese possessions in Africa, but also their Social Democratic, the Centre Party and the People's Party colleagues. In May 1969 a decision was passed on Swedish support for the anti-colonial movements in the Portuguese colonies in Africa. Sweden thus became the first Western country to give official support to these organizations. However, whilst the Swedish left wing and solidarity movements called for 'unconditional support' to the armed struggle of PAIGC, the official Swedish aid was limited to non-military activities. The right wing Moderate Party was the sole parliamentary force which opposed Swedish assistance to the anti-colonial movements.

A key factor behind the decision on behalf of the Swedish government to initiate aid efforts to PAIGC was that by the late 1960s PAIGC controlled a vast section of the territory of the country and that the movement sought foreign assistance for the build-up of social services, health care and education in these areas. Between mid-1969 and mid-1975 PAIGC received 45.2 million Swedish kronor in aid from the Swedish state, representing two-thirds of the Swedish assistance to African liberation movements during this period. Sweden was the most important donor of non-military material for PAIGC during the latter phase of the liberation war. There existed an uncoordinated de facto division of labour between Sweden and the Soviet Union, whilst Sweden supplied PAIGC with non-military donations the Soviet provided the weaponry for the armed struggle.

The Swedish position towards PAIGC enabled other Western countries to take similar positions. In 1972 Norway broke the NATO ranks (Portugal, against which PAIGC was waging armed struggle, was a NATO member) and initiated an official assistance programme for PAIGC.

Cabral himself had been heavily involved in the design and follow-up on the Swedish-Guinean cooperation projects. After the murder of Cabral in 1973 Olof Palme sent his condoleances to PAIGC and Cabral's widow, stating that Cabral had been 'one of the foremost leaders of the Third World'.

== After independence ==
Guinea-Bissau was declared independent on 24 September 1973. At the time, PAIGC was still at war with the Portuguese armed forces in the country. In Sweden groups like the Left Party-Communists and the Africa Groups solidarity movement called on the Swedish government to recognize Guinea-Bissau. However, official diplomatic recognition would not be established until 9 August 1974 (following the Portuguese Carnation Revolution), a month before Portugal officially withdrew its claims from the area.

After the independence of Guinea-Bissau, the economic relations between the two countries were concentrated around Swedish development assistance to Guinea-Bissau. After the recognition of the independence of Guinea-Bissau, it was the sole West African country to be designated 'programme country' for Swedish development assistance. Swedish development assistance between mid-1974 and mid-1995 accounted for 2.5 billion kronor (as of 1995 price levels). Sweden was one of the top three donor countries of Guinea-Bissau during this period. On the other hand, exports from Guinea-Bissau to Sweden remained marginal, during the period 1975-1980 the peak of Guinean exports to Sweden was at 275,000 kronor in one year.

== See also ==
- Foreign relations of Guinea-Bissau
- Foreign relations of Sweden
