= Visa requirements for Guinea-Bissauan citizens =

Administrative entry restrictions

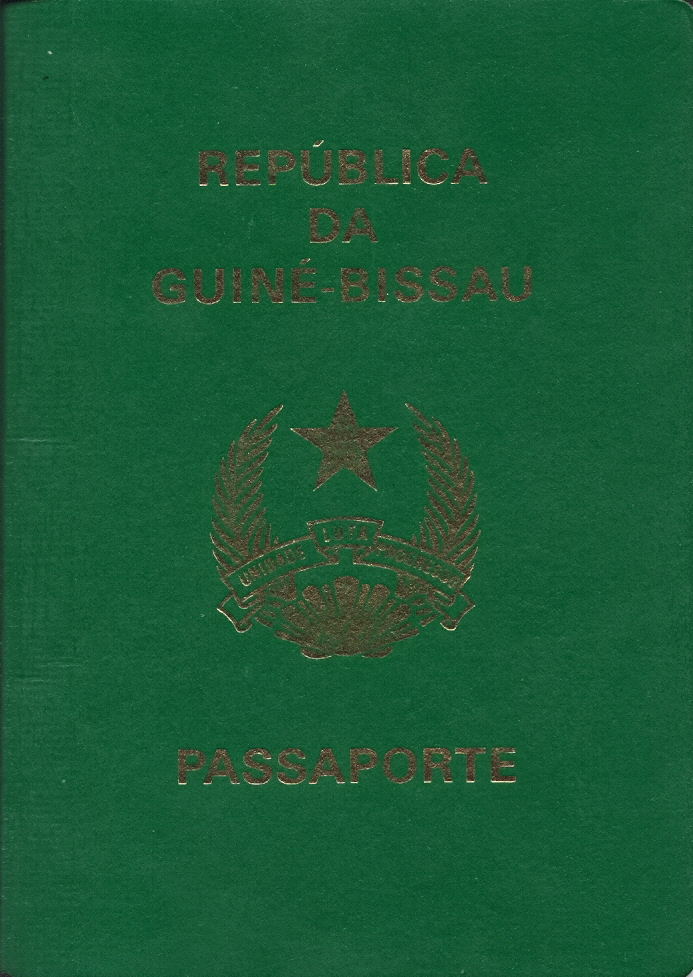
A Guinea-Bissauan passport

Visa requirements for Guinea-Bissauan citizens are administrative entry restrictions by the authorities of other states placed on citizens of the Guinea-Bissau. As of 2026, Guinea-Bissauan citizens had visa-free or visa on arrival access to 50 countries and territories, ranking the Guinea-Bissauan passport 82nd in terms of travel freedom according to the Henley Passport Index.

== Visa requirements map ==
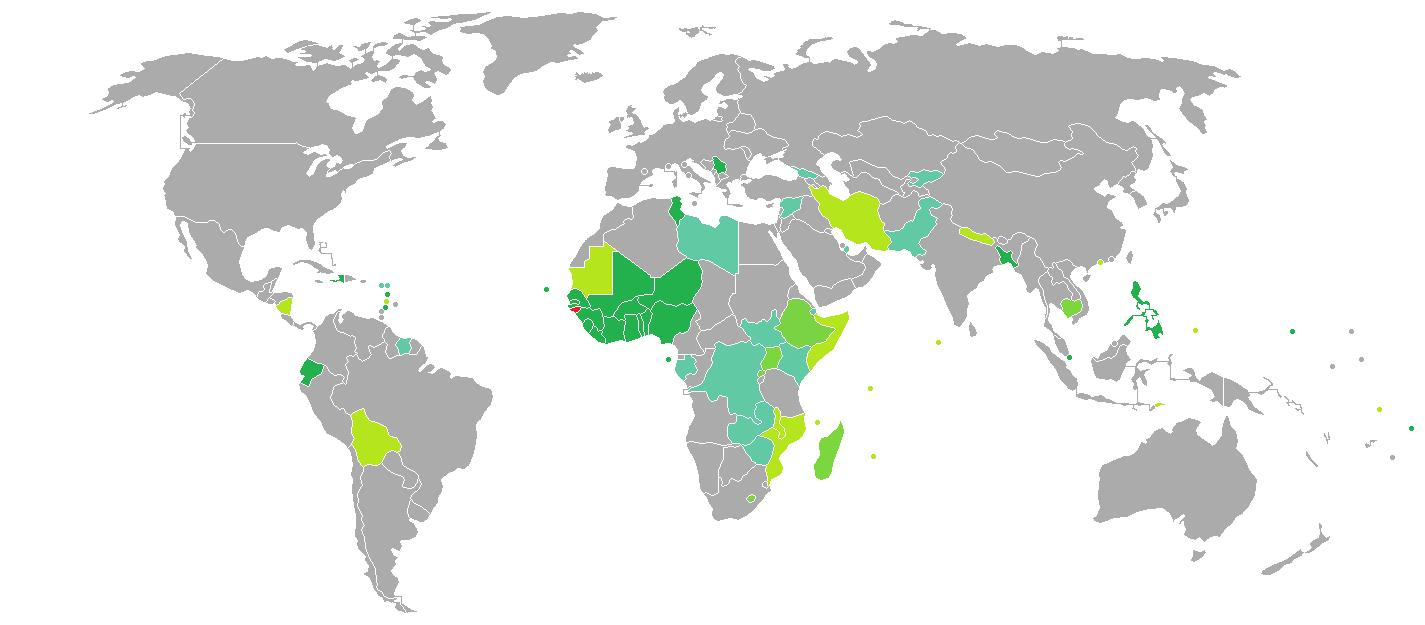
Visa requirements for Guinea-Bissauan citizens Guinea-Bissau Visa not required Visa obtainable on arrival eVisa Visa available both on arrival or online Pre-arrival visa required

== Visa requirements ==
Country	Visa requirement	Allowed stay	Notes (excluding departure fees)
Afghanistan	eVisa		Visa is not required in case born in Afghanistan or can proof that one of their parents is a national of Afghanistan or born in Afghanistan.; e-Visa : Visitors must arrive at Kabul International (KBL).
Albania	eVisa		Visa is not required for Holders of a valid multiple-entry Schengen, UK or US visa has been previously used once or residence permit of Schengen, UK, US or UAE 10 years.
Algeria	Visa required		
Andorra	Visa required		
Angola	eVisa	30 days	30 days per trip, but no more than 90 days within any 1 calendar year for tourism purposes only.; Visitors must have a return/onward ticket and a hotel reservation confirmation.; An International Certificate of Vaccination is required.
Antigua and Barbuda	eVisa		
Argentina	Visa required		The AVE (High Speed Travel) is open to Guinea-Bissauan citizens holding valid, current ordinary passports traveling to Argentina for tourism. To do so, they must hold a valid category B2/J/B1/O/P (P1-P2-P3)/E/H-1B visa issued by the United States of America.
Armenia	Visa required		
Australia and territories	Visa required		May apply online (Online Visitor e600 visa).
Austria	Visa required		
Azerbaijan	Visa required		
Bahamas	eVisa	90 days	
Bahrain	eVisa	14 days	
Bangladesh	Visa not required	90 days	
Barbados	Visa not required	90 days	
Belarus	Visa required		
Belgium	Visa required		
Belize	Visa required		
Benin	Visa not required	90 days	
Bhutan	eVisa	90 days	Visa fee is 40 USD per person and visa application may be processed within 5 business days with duration of stay of 90 days.; e-Visa applicant is also subject to pay Sustainable Development Fee
Bolivia	eVisa	90 days	
Bosnia and Herzegovina	Visa required		
Botswana	eVisa		
Brazil	Visa required		
Brunei	Visa required		
Bulgaria	Visa required		
Burkina Faso	Visa not required		
Burundi	Visa on arrival	30 days	
Cambodia	eVisa / Visa on arrival	30 days	
Cameroon	eVisa		
Canada	Visa required		
Cape Verde	Visa not required		
Central African Republic	Visa required		
Chad	eVisa		
Chile	Visa required		
China	Visa required		
Colombia	eVisa	90 days	May apply online.
Comoros	Visa on arrival	45 days	
Republic of the Congo	Visa required		
Democratic Republic of the Congo	eVisa	7 days	
Costa Rica	Visa required		
Côte d'Ivoire	Visa not required	90 days	
Croatia	Visa required		
Cuba	eVisa	90 days	
Cyprus	Visa required		
Czech Republic	Visa required		
Denmark	Visa required		
Djibouti	eVisa	31 days	
Dominica	Visa not required	21 days	
Dominican Republic	Visa required		
Ecuador	Visa not required	90 days	
Egypt	Visa required		
El Salvador	eVisa		
Equatorial Guinea	eVisa		
Eritrea	Visa required		
Estonia	Visa required		
Eswatini	Visa required		
Ethiopia	eVisa / Visa on arrival	up to 90 days	Visa on arrival is obtainable only at Addis Ababa Bole International Airport.; e-Visa holders must arrive via Addis Ababa Bole International Airport.; e-Visa is available for 30 or 90 days.
Fiji	Visa required		
Finland	Visa required		
France	Visa required		
Gabon	eVisa		Electronic visa holders must arrive via Libreville International Airport.
Gambia	Visa not required		
Georgia	eVisa		
Germany	Visa required		
Ghana	Visa not required		
Greece	Visa required		
Grenada	Visa required		
Guatemala	Visa required		
Guinea	Visa not required		
Guyana	Visa required		
Haiti	Visa not required	3 months	
Honduras	Visa required		
Hungary	Visa required		
Iceland	Visa required		
India	Visa required		
Indonesia	Visa required		
Iran	eVisa / Visa on arrival	30 days	
Iraq	eVisa		
Ireland	Visa required		
Israel	Visa required		
Italy	Visa required		
Jamaica	Visa required		
Japan	Visa required		Eligible for an e-Visa if residing in one of these countries Australia, Brazil, Cambodia, Canada, India, Saudi Arabia, Singapore, South Africa, Taiwan, United Arab Emirates, United Kingdom, United States.; May apply online
Jordan	Visa required		
Kazakhstan	eVisa		
Kenya	Visa not required	60 days	
Kiribati	Visa required		
North Korea	Visa required		
South Korea	Visa required		Multiple-Entry Visa may be granted to whom entered South Korea 4 or more times within the last 2 years, or 10 or more visits in total (one of those 10 visits should be within the last 2 years).; May apply online
Kuwait	Visa required		e-Visa can be obtained for holders of a Residence Permit issued by a GCC member state under the following conditions: To be 18 years old and over.; The residence permit for a GCC state must be valid for at least another 3 months.; To be accompanied by the sponsor of the residence permit if the sponsor is an individual.; Does not apply to holders of a GCC Student Visa and Non-Skilled Worker Visa
Kyrgyzstan	eVisa		
Laos	Visa required		
Latvia	Visa required		
Lebanon	Visa required		
Lesotho	eVisa		
Liberia	Visa not required		
Libya	eVisa		
Liechtenstein	Visa required		
Lithuania	Visa required		
Luxembourg	Visa required		
Madagascar	eVisa / Visa on arrival	90 days	
Malawi	eVisa / Visa on arrival	30 days	
Malaysia	eVisa	14 days	
Maldives	Visa on arrival	30 days	
Mali	Visa not required		
Malta	Visa required		
Marshall Islands	Visa required		
Mauritania	eVisa		
Mauritius	Visa on arrival	60 days	
Mexico	Visa required		Visa is not required for Holders of a valid visa of Canada, US, UK or a Schengen State and Permanent residence of Canada, Chile, Colombia, Schengen State, Japan, UK, US; Entry may be refused by immigration officials for individuals who were previously denied a US visa, even if holding a valid Mexican visa.
Micronesia	Visa not required	30 days	
Moldova	eVisa		visa not required if holding a valid visa /residence permit that is issued by a European Union member state or Schengen Area, Canada, Ireland, UK, US
Monaco	Visa required		
Mongolia	eVisa		
Montenegro	Visa required		Visa not required for holders of a valid Australia, Japan, Canada, New Zealand, Ireland, US, UK or a Schengen Visa.; Holders of residence permit in the United Arab Emirates may enter, in Montenegro for a duration of 10 days
Morocco	Visa required		
Mozambique	eVisa / Visa on arrival	30 days	
Myanmar	Visa required		
Namibia	eVisa / Visa on arrival		
Nauru	Visa required		
Nepal	eVisa / Visa on arrival	90 days	
Netherlands	Visa required		
New Zealand	Visa required		Holders of an Australian Permanent Resident Visa or Resident Return Visa may be granted a New Zealand Resident Visa on arrival permitting indefinite stay (pursuant to the Trans-Tasman Travel Arrangement), subject to meeting character requirements and obtaining an Electronic Travel Authority prior to departure.
Nicaragua	Visa on arrival	30 days	
Niger	Visa not required		
Nigeria	Visa not required		
North Macedonia	Visa required		Visa is not required for stays upto 15 days if holding a valid multiple entry visa of Canada, the United States, United Kingdom, Schengen Area member state, or residence permit of Schengen Area member state.
Norway	Visa required		
Oman	Visa required		
Pakistan	Online Visa		Online Visa eligible.; Electronic Travel Authorization to obtain a visa on arrival for business purposes.
Palau	Visa on arrival	30 days	
Panama	Visa required		Visa is not required for holders of a multiple-entry visa valid for at least 6 months at the time of entry or permanent residency issued by Australia, Canada, European Union, Japan, Singapore, South Korea, US, UK.
Papua New Guinea	eVisa		May apply for an e-visa under the type of "Tourist - Own Itinerary".
Paraguay	Visa required		
Peru	Visa required		
Philippines	Visa not required	30 days	
Poland	Visa required		
Portugal	Visa required		
Qatar	eVisa		
Romania	Visa required		
Russia	Visa required		
Rwanda	Visa not required	30 days	
Saint Kitts and Nevis	eVisa		
Saint Lucia	Visa on arrival	6 weeks	
Saint Vincent and the Grenadines	Visa not required	1 month	
Samoa	Entry Permit on arrival	60 days	
San Marino	Visa required		
São Tomé and Príncipe	Visa not required	15 days	
Saudi Arabia	Visa required		
Senegal	Visa not required	90 days	
Serbia	Visa required		
Seychelles	Visitor's Permit on arrival	3 months	
Sierra Leone	Visa not required		
Singapore	Visa not required	30 days	
Slovakia	Visa required		
Slovenia	Visa required		
Solomon Islands	Visa required		
Somalia	eVisa	30 days	
South Africa	Visa required		
South Sudan	eVisa		Obtainable online; Printed visa authorization must be presented at the time of travel
Spain	Visa required		
Sri Lanka	ETA / Visa on arrival		Electronic Travel Authorization can also be obtained on arrival.; 30 days extendable to 6 months.; The standard visitor visa allows a stay of 60 days within any 6-month period.; Visa fees (for Standard visitor visa): SAARC - USD 35; Non SAARC - USD 75; e-Visa categories will be charged an additional USD 18.50 service fee.; If transiting from any of the Sri Lankan airports, An e-Visa is exempted (2 day transit period).
Sudan	Visa required		
Suriname	eVisa		
Sweden	Visa required		
Switzerland	Visa required		
Syria	eVisa		
Tajikistan	eVisa		
Tanzania	eVisa		
Thailand	eVisa		
Timor-Leste	Visa on arrival	30 days	
Togo	Visa not required		
Tonga	Visa required		
Trinidad and Tobago	eVisa		
Tunisia	Visa not required	3 months	
Turkey	Visa required		
Turkmenistan	Visa required		
Tuvalu	Visa on arrival	1 month	
Uganda	eVisa		May apply online.
Ukraine	Visa required		
United Arab Emirates	Visa required		May apply online.; May apply also using 'Smart service'.
United Kingdom and Crown dependencies	Visa required		
United States	Visa required		
Uruguay	Visa required		
Uzbekistan	Visa required		
Vanuatu	eVisa		
Vatican City	Visa required		
Venezuela	Visa required		
Vietnam	eVisa	90 days	Visa free for 30 days when visiting Phú Quốc
Yemen	Visa required		
Zambia	eVisa	30 days	
Zimbabwe	eVisa	30 days	

== Dependent, disputed, or restricted territories ==
Unrecognized or partially recognized countries

Territory	Conditions of access	Notes
Abkhazia	Visa required	
Kosovo	Visa required	Do not need a visa a holder of a valid biometric residence permit issued by one of the Schengen member states or a valid multi-entry Schengen Visa, a holder of a valid Laissez-Passer issued by United Nations Organizations, NATO, OSCE, Council of Europe or European Union a holder of a valid travel documents issued by EU Member and Schengen States, United States of America, Canada, Australia and Japan based on the 1951 Convention on Refugee Status or the 1954 Convention on the Status of Stateless Persons, as well as holders of valid travel documents for foreigners (max. 15 days stay)
Northern Cyprus	Visa not required	
Palestine	Visa not required	Arrival by sea to the Gaza Strip not allowed.
Sahrawi Arab Democratic Republic		Undefined visa regime in the Western Sahara controlled territory.
Somaliland	Visa on arrival	30 days for 30 US dollars, payable on arrival.
South Ossetia	Visa not required	Multiple entry visa to Russia and three-day prior notification are required to enter South Ossetia.
Taiwan	Visa required	
Transnistria	Visa not required	Registration required after 24h.

Dependent and autonomous territories

Territory	Conditions of access	Notes
China
Hong Kong	eVisa	
Macau	Visa on arrival	
Denmark
Faroe Islands	Visa required	
Greenland	Visa required	
France
French Guiana	Visa required	
French Polynesia	Visa required	
(France) French West Indies	Visa required	Includes overseas departments of Guadeloupe and Martinique and overseas collectivities of Saint Barthélemy and Saint Martin.
Mayotte	Visa required	
New Caledonia	Visa required	
Réunion	Visa required	
Saint Pierre and Miquelon	Visa required	
Wallis and Futuna	Visa required	
Netherlands
Aruba	Visa required	
Caribbean Netherlands	Visa required	Includes Bonaire, Sint Eustatius and Saba.
Curaçao	Visa required	
Sint Maarten	Visa required	
New Zealand
Cook Islands	Visa not required	31 days
Niue	Visa not required	30 days
Tokelau	Visa required	
United Kingdom
Akrotiri and Dhekelia	Visa required	
Anguilla	Visa required	Holders of a valid visa issued by the United Kingdom do not require a visa.
Bermuda	Visa required	
British Indian Ocean Territory	Special permit required	Special permit required.
British Virgin Islands	Visa required	
Cayman Islands	Visa required	
Falkland Islands	Visa required	
Gibraltar	Visa required	
Montserrat	eVisa	
Pitcairn Islands	Visa not required	14 days visa free and landing fee 35 USD or tax of 5 USD if not going ashore.
Ascension Island	eVisa	3 months within any year period
Saint Helena	eVisa	
Tristan da Cunha	Permission required	Permission to land required for 15/30 pounds sterling (yacht/ship passenger) for Tristan da Cunha Island or 20 pounds sterling for Gough Island, Inaccessible Island or Nightingale Islands.
South Georgia and the South Sandwich Islands	Permit required	Pre-arrival permit from the Commissioner required (72 hours/1 month for 110/160 pounds sterling).
Turks and Caicos Islands	Visa required	Holders of a valid visa issued by Canada, United Kingdom or the USA do not required a visa for a maximum stay of 90 days.
United States
American Samoa	Visa required	
Guam	Visa required	
Northern Mariana Islands	Visa required	
Puerto Rico	Visa required	
U.S. Virgin Islands	Visa required	
Antarctica and adjacent islands
Special permits required for Bouvet Island, British Antarctic Territory, French Southern and Antarctic Lands, Argentine Antarctica, (Australia) Australian Antarctic Territory, (Antártica Chilena Province) Chilean Antarctic Territory, (Australia) Heard Island and McDonald Islands, (Norway) Peter I Island, (Norway) Queen Maud Land, (New Zealand) Ross Dependency.

== See also ==
- Visa policy of Guinea-Bissau
- Guinea-Bissauan passport
