= Brazil–Guinea-Bissau relations =

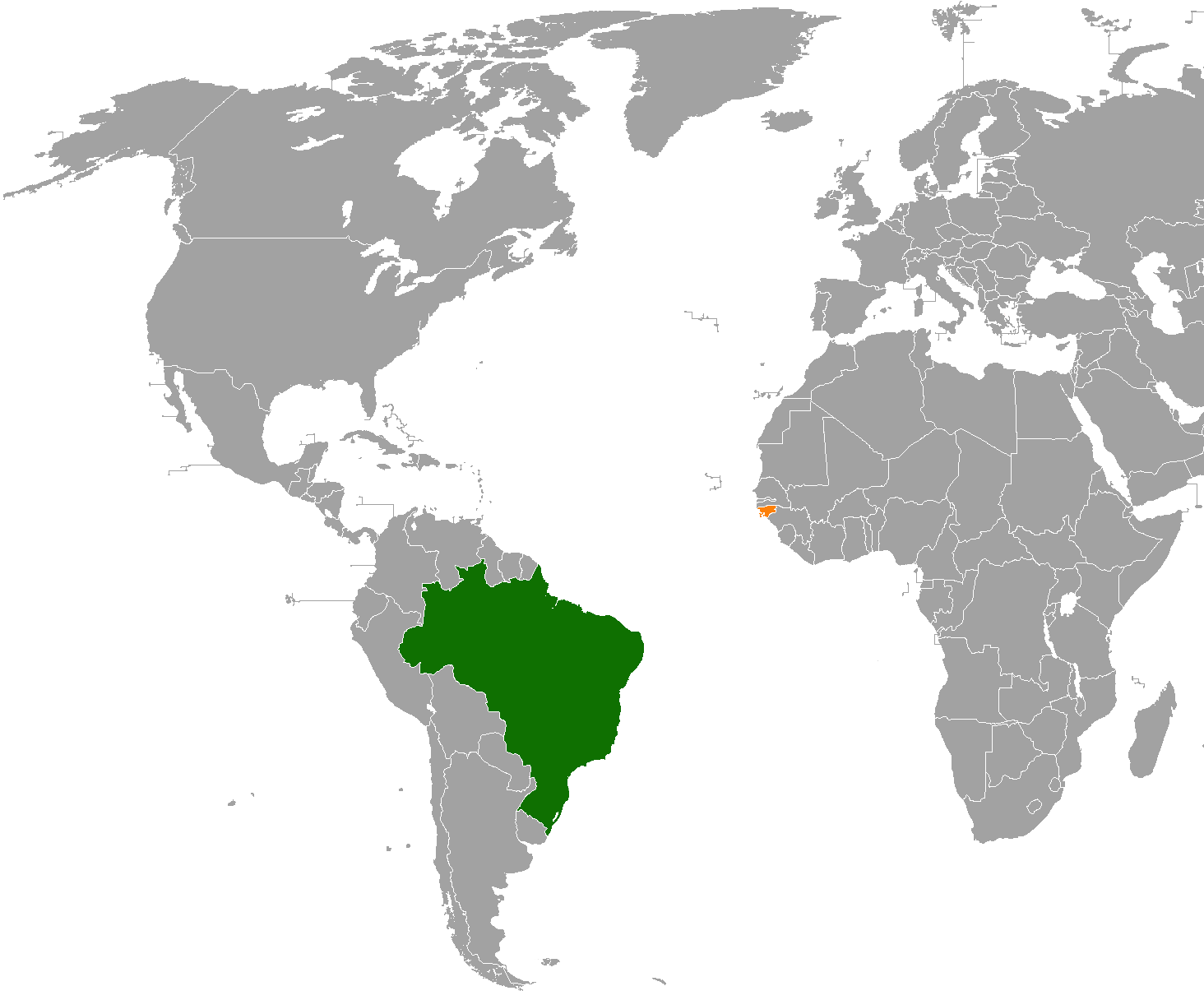

- Brazil: Guinea-Bissau

Brazil–Guinea-Bissau relations are the bilateral relations between Brazil and Guinea-Bissau. Both nations are members of the Community of Portuguese Language Countries, Group of 77 and the United Nations.

== History ==
Both Brazil and Guinea-Bissau were united for three hundred years as part of the Portuguese Empire. As part of the Portuguese Empire and during the Atlantic slave trade, Brazil received thousands of Bissau-Guinean who arrived in the country as slaves. From 1815 to 1822, Guinea-Bissau was administered by Brazil during the Transfer of the Portuguese court to Brazil.

In September 1973, Guinea-Bissau declared its independence from Portugal. On 16 July 1974, Brazil recognized Guinea-Bissau's independence ahead of Portugal's recognition. Shortly thereafter the two countries established diplomatic relations. That same year, Brazil opened an embassy in Bissau. In 1984, Brazilian President João Figueiredo paid an official visit to Guinea-Bissau, the first for a Brazilian President. The visit was reciprocated in 1997, with Bissau-Guinean President João Bernardo Vieira visiting Brazil. There have been numerous high-level visits between leaders of both nations since the initial visits.

In 2010, Bissau-Guinean President, Malam Bacai Sanhá, paid a visit to Brazil. During his visit, several agreements were signed, such as an Agreement for the Implementation of Programs to Combat HIV/AIDS in Guinea-Bissau; Agreement to Assist Women and Adolescents Victims of Gender-Based Violence; Agreement on Exercise of Remunerated Activity by dependents of Diplomatic, Consular, Military, Administrative and Technical Personnel; Memorandum of Understanding in the Field of Agriculture; Memorandum of Understanding in the Fisheries Sector; and a Memorandum of Understanding on Higher Education.

In May 1978, the Brazilian and Guinea-Bissauan governments signed a technical cooperation agreement, whereby the Brazilian government would support socioeconomic development in Guinea-Bissau. Guinea-Bissau is one of the largest recipients of development projects with funds from the Brazilian Cooperation Agency. The Brazilian Cooperation Agency assists and develops projects in several diverse areas, including security, health, agriculture, education, food security, justice, support for elections, among others, in Guinea-Bissau.

== High-level visits ==
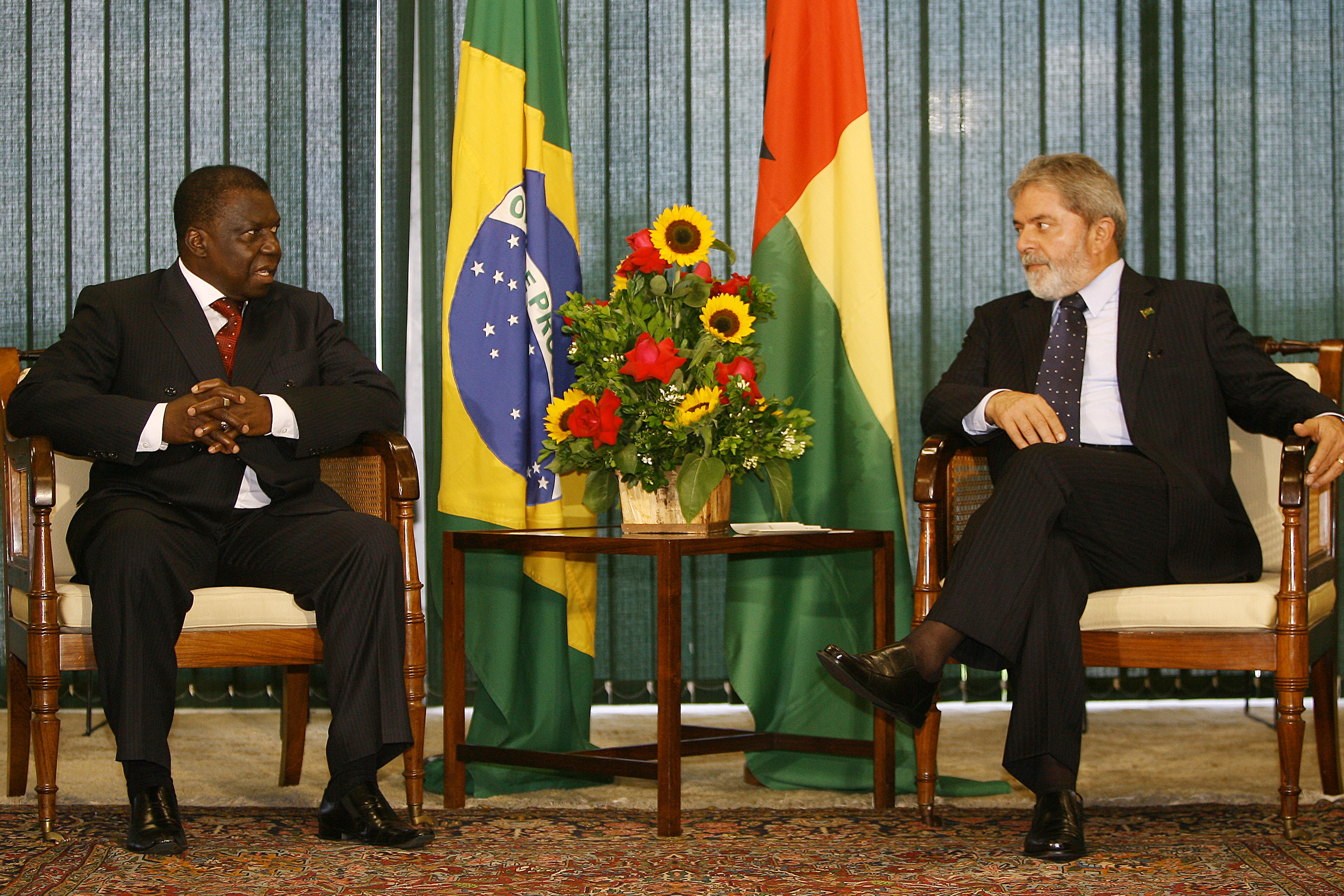
Bissau-Guinean President João Bernardo Vieira meeting with Brazilian President Luiz Inácio Lula da Silva in Brasília, 2007.

High-level visits from Brazil to Guinea-Bissau

- President João Figueiredo (1984)
- President Luiz Inácio Lula da Silva (2005)
- Foreign Minister Celso Amorim (2009)

High-level visits from Guinea-Bissau to Brazil

- President João Bernardo Vieira (1997, 2007)
- President Malam Bacai Sanhá (2010)
- President José Mário Vaz (2015)
- President Umaro Sissoco Embaló (2021, 2023)

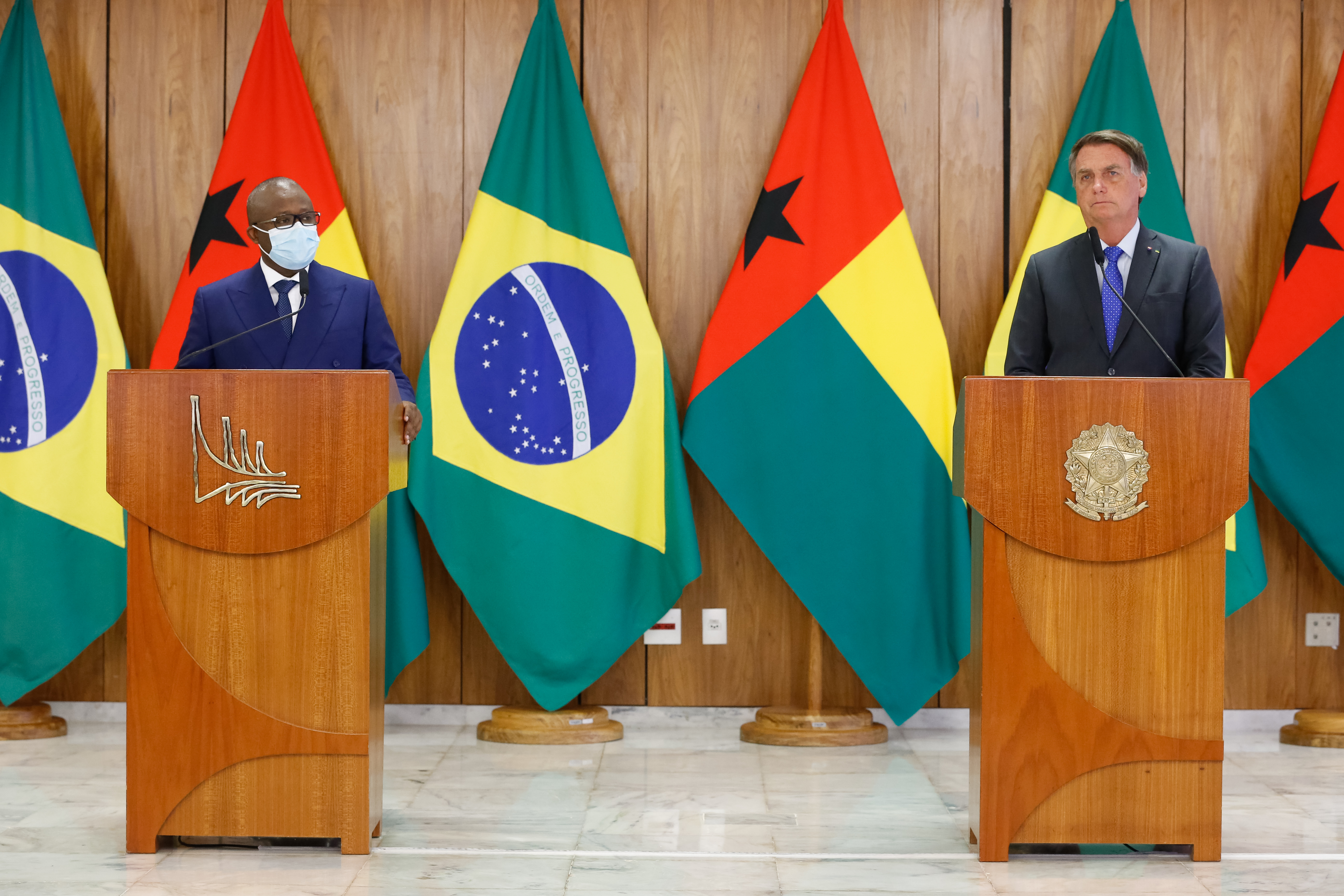
President Umaro Sissoco Embaló and President Jair Bolsonaro in Brasília; 2021.

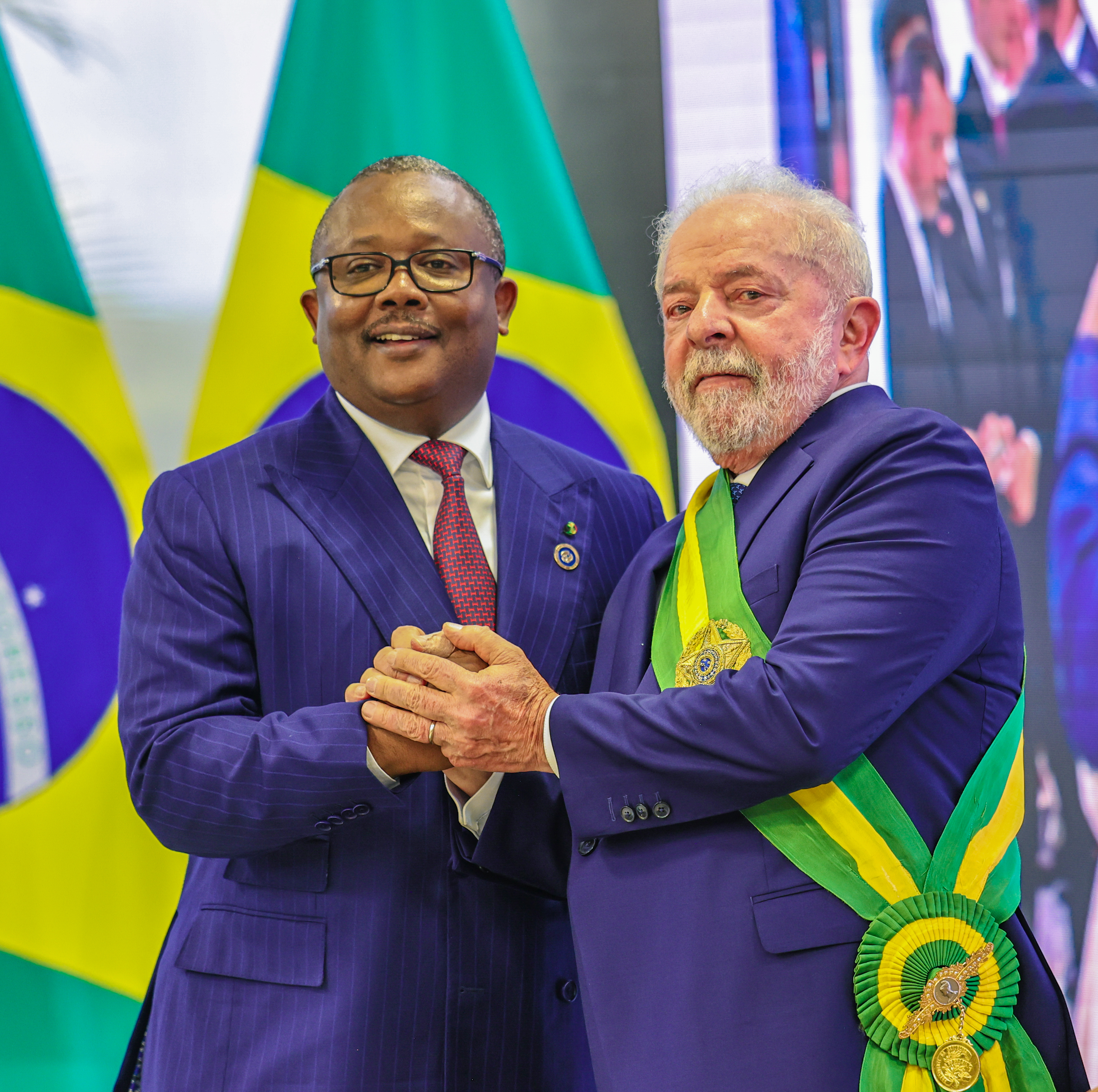
President Umaro Sissoco Embaló and President Lula da Silva in Brasília; 2023.

== Resident diplomatic missions ==
- Brazil has an embassy in Bissau.
- Guinea-Bissau has an embassy in Brasília.

== See also ==
- Lusophone Games
- United Kingdom of Portugal, Brazil and the Algarves

== Bibliography ==
- Mendy, Peter Karibe; Lobban, Richard A. Jr. (2013). Historical Dictionary of the Republic of Guinea-Bissau (fourth ed.). Scarecrow Press. ISBN 9780810880276.
