= Guinea-Bissau–Portugal relations =

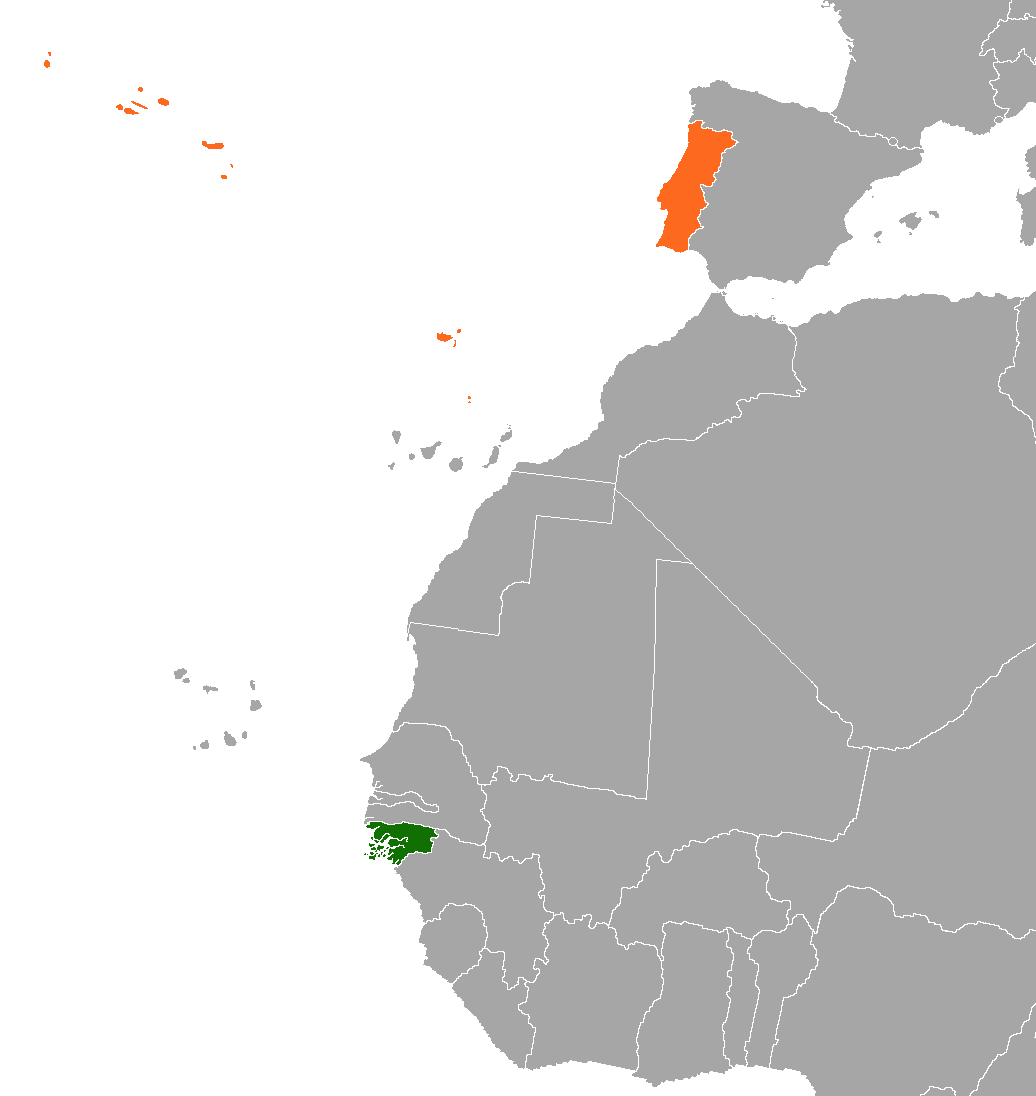

- Guinea-Bissau: Portugal

Guinea-Bissau–Portugal relations refers to the bilateral relations between Guinea-Bissau and Portugal. Both nations are members of the Community of Portuguese Language Countries and the United Nations.

== History ==
In 1446, the first Portuguese sailors arrived to what is now Guinea-Bissau searching for gold. The territory subsequently became administered as part of the Portuguese Cape Verde islands before being separated and called Portuguese Guinea. Portuguese Guinea became an important post in the Atlantic slave trade, particularly to Brazil. In 1879, Guinea-Bissau became a separate colony within the Portuguese Empire.

In 1956, Amílcar Cabral created the African Party for the Independence of Guinea and Cape Verde (PAIGC), fighting against colonialism and starting a march for independence. In 1963, the Guinea-Bissau War of Independence broke out, lasting until 1974. The war ended when Portugal, after the Carnation Revolution of 1974, granted independence to Guinea-Bissau on 10 September 1974.

Since independence, relations between Guinea-Bissau and Portugal have remained strong. There are many cultural similarities between both nations. There have also been several high-level visits between leaders of both nations and both countries work closely together within the Community of Portuguese Language Countries.

In August 2025, Portugal's government summoned the ambassador of Guinea-Bissau and condemned the expulsion of reporting teams of state news agency Lusa and two African units of broadcaster RTP from the country in the run-up to the general election.

== Transportation ==
There are direct flights between both nations, operated by EuroAtlantic Airways and TAP Air Portugal.

== Trade ==
In 2017, trade between both nations totaled €90 million Euros. Portugal is one of Guinea-Bissau's largest trading partners.

== Resident diplomatic missions ==
- Guinea-Bissau has an embassy in Lisbon and a consulate-general in Albufeira.
- Portugal has an embassy in Bissau.

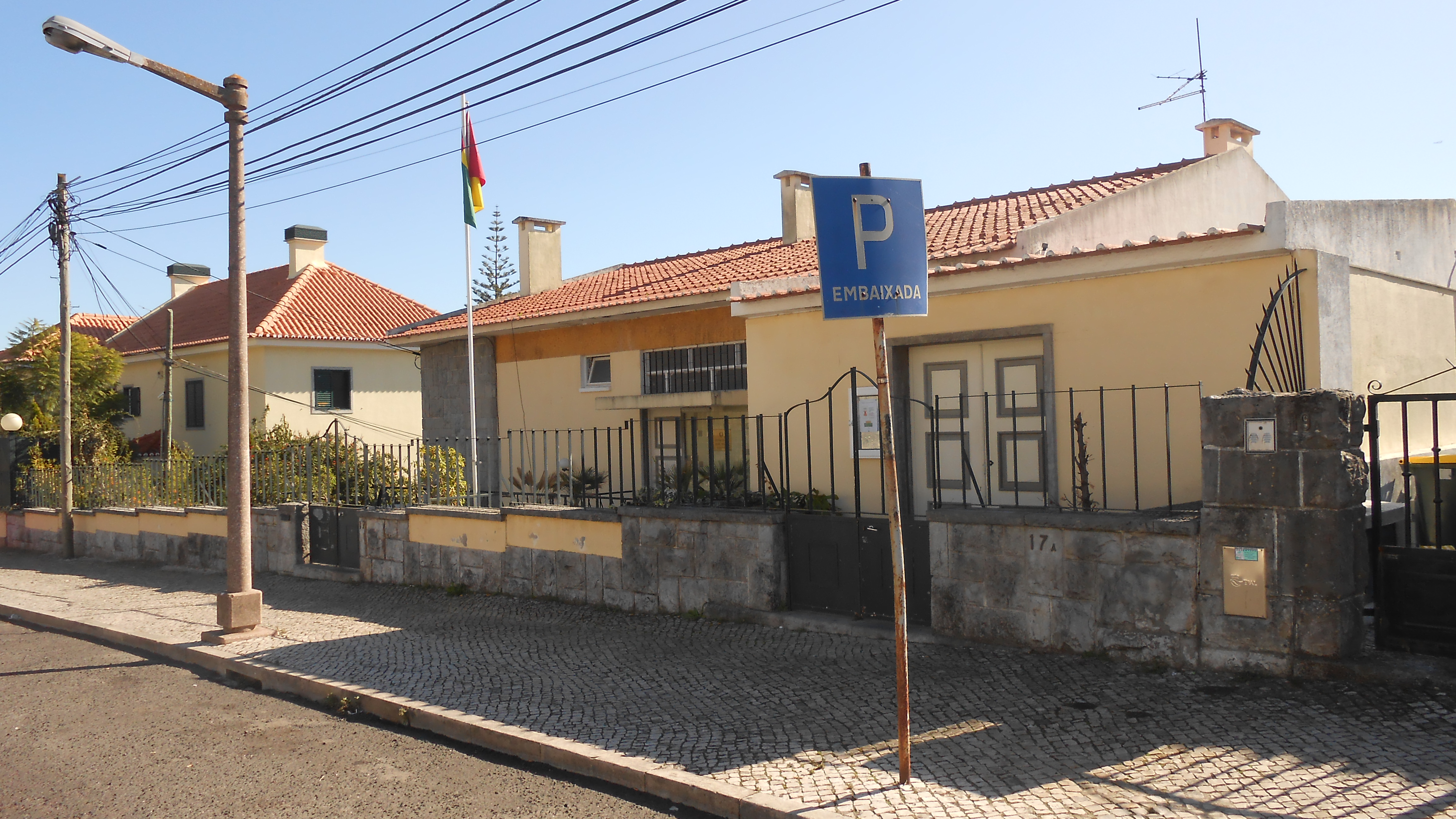
Embassy of Guinea-Bissau in Lisbon

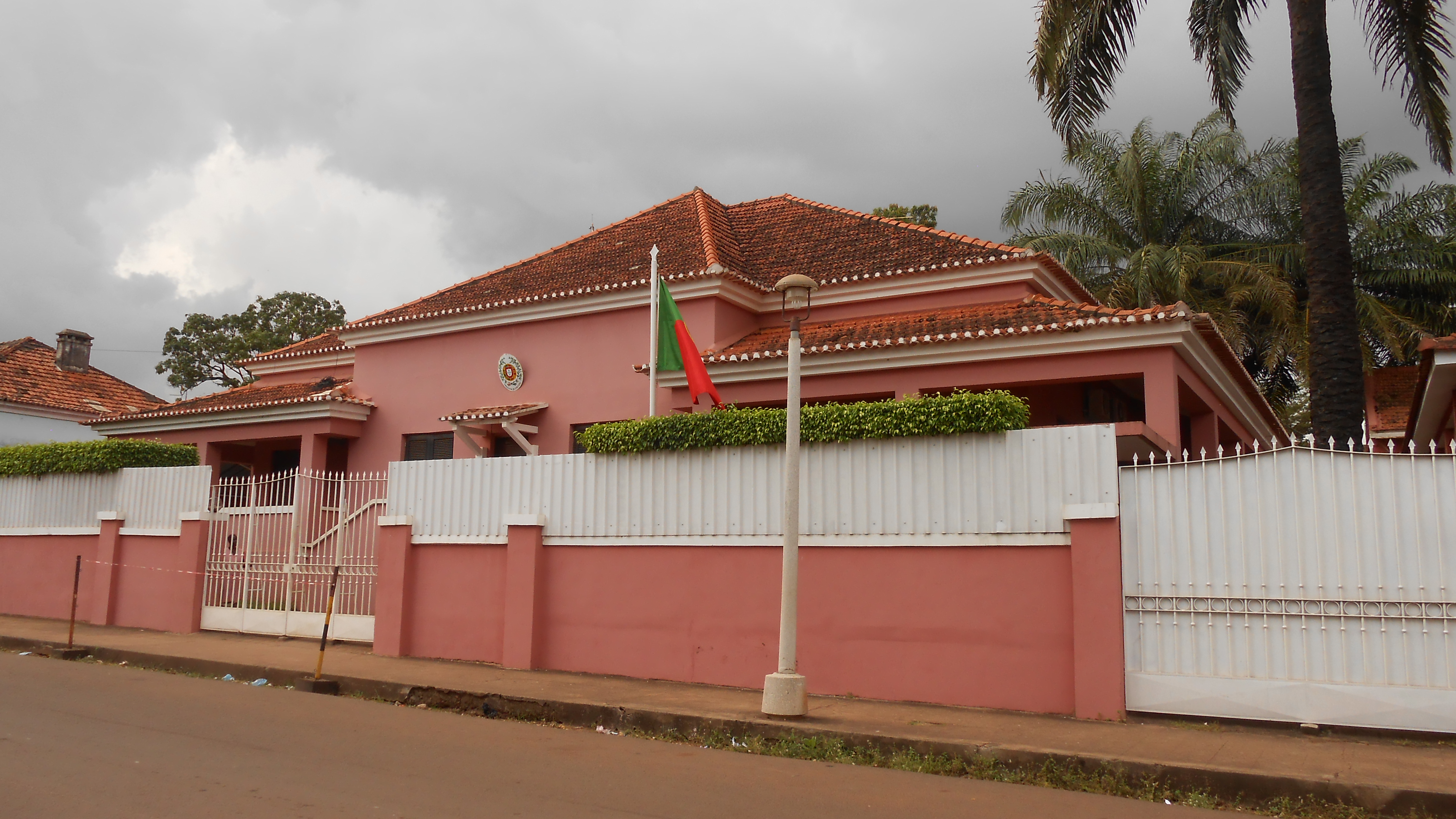
Embassy of Portugal in Bissau

== See also ==
- Portuguese Africans
- Portuguese language in Africa
