= Rogério Araújo Adolfo Herbert =

Guinea-Bissauan diplomat

Rogério Araújo Adolfo Herbert is a Guinea-Bissauan diplomat and is the current Ambassador Extraordinary and Plenipotentiary of the Republic of Guinea-Bissau to the Russian Federation, presenting his Letter of Credence to then-President of Russia Boris Yeltsin on 14 August 1997. As the longest-serving Ambassador in Moscow, Herbert holds the unofficial title of Dean of the Diplomatic Corps.

In January 2005, Herbert was taken hostage by up to 100 Guinea-Bissauan students who were studying in Russia. The students claimed that the 200-odd Guinea-Bissauan students studying in Russia had not received their US$60 per month stipend, and would hold Herbert hostage until such time as their arrears were paid.
