= List of Bissau-Guineans =

The following is a list of people from Guinea-Bissau.

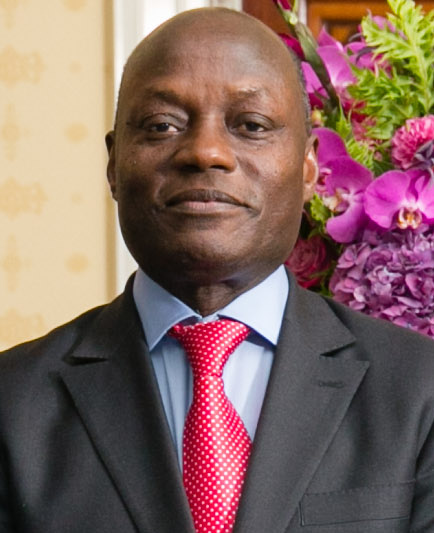
José Mário Vaz, Former President of Guinea-Bissau

- Amarildo Almeida (1976–), Olympic sprinter
- Fernando Arlete (sprinter) (1979–), Olympic sprinter
- Fernando Arlete (distance runner) (1968–), Olympic distance runner
- Fatumata Djau Baldé, politician
- Rafael Paula Barbosa (1926–2007), politician. Founded Democratic Social Front. Born in Safim.
- Suzi Barbosa, politician
- Francisco Benante (1954?–), lawyer and politician
- José Câmnate na Bissign (1953–), Roman Catholic bishop. Born in Mansôa.
- Alfredo Lopes Cabral (1946–), diplomat
- Amílcar Cabral (1924–1973), political organizer and diplomat. Born in Bafatá.
- Luís Cabral (1931–2009), first President. Born in Bissau.
- Maria da Conceição Nobre Cabral, politician
- Vasco Cabral (1926–2005), writer and politician. Born in Farim.
- Anhel Cape (1978–), Olympic sprinter
- Taciana Cesar (1988–), Olympic judoka
- Carlos Correia (1933–2021), former Prime Minister. Born in Bissau
- Manuel Saturnino da Costa (1942–), former Prime Minister
- Baciro Dabó (1958–2009), politician
- Yaya Diallo, former Foreign Minister
- Baciro Djá (1973–), former Prime Minister
- Umaro Djau (1967–), international journalist and politician. Born in Gabú region
- Kimi Djabate (1975–), Afro-beat musician. Born in Tabato.
- Fausto Duarte (1903–1953), novelist. Born in Cape Verde.
- Talata Embalo (1963–) Olympic wrestler
- Umaro Sissoco Embaló (1972–), Prime Minister. Born in Bissau
- Francisco Fadul (1953–), former Prime Minister
- Diamantino Iuna Fafé (2001–), Olympic wrestler
- António Baticã Ferreira (1939–), poet. Born in Canchungo.
- Antonieta Rosa Gomes (1959–), politician. Founder of Guinean Civic Forum–Social Democracy party (FCG/SD).
- Aristides Gomes (1954–), former Prime Minister. Born in Canchungo.
- Fernando Gomes, politician
- Flora Gomes (1949–), film director. Born in Cadique.
- Carlos Gomes Júnior (1949–), former Prime Minister. Born in Bolama.
- Rogério Araújo Adolfo Herbert, diplomat
- Kumba Ialá (1953–2014), former president. Born in Bula.
- Faustino Imbali (1956–), former Prime Minister. Born in Ilondé.
- Jessica Inchude (1996–), Olympic shot-putter
- Zamora Induta (1966–), former Army Chief of Staff. Born in Bissau.
- Martinho Ndafa Kabi (1957–), former Prime Minister. Born in Nhacra.
- Mamadu Ture Kuruma, Army general
- Taciana Lima (1983–), Olympic judoka
- Carlo Lopes, economist
- Ansumane Mané (c.1940–2000), former Army Chief-of-Staff
- Victor Saúde Maria (1939–1999), former Prime Minister
- Eneida Marta (c.1973–), singer
- Bruno Medina (1987–), basketball player
- Francisco Mendes (1939–1978), former Prime Minister. Born in Enxude.
- Jacira Mendonca (1986–), Olympic wrestler
- Augusto Midana (1984–), Olympic wrestler
- António Isaac Monteiro, former Foreign Minister
- Edivaldo Monteiro (1976–), Olympic hurdler
- Maria do Céu Monteiro, President of Supreme Court
- Adiato Djaló Nandigna (1948–), politician
- Manuel Serifo Nhamadjo (1958–), politician
- Alamara Nhassé (1957–), former Prime Minister
- Caetano N'Tchama (1955–), former Prime Minister
- Carmen Pereira (1937–2016), activist and politician
- Domingos Simões Pereira (1963–), former Prime Minister
- Francisca Pereira (1942–), politician. Born in Bolama
- Raimundo Pereira (1956–), lawyer and politician, former interim President
- Benjamin Pinto Bull (1916–2005), politician and activist. Born in Bolama.
- Mamadu Saliu Djaló Pires, politician
- Mário Pires (1949–), former Prime Minister
- Rajeshwar Prasad (1968–), entrepreneur and Cabinet Minister
- Helder Proença (?–2009), politician
- Adelino Mano Quetá, politician
- Danilson Ricciuli (1982–), Olympic sprinter
- Henrique Rosa (1946–2013), former interim President, 2003–5. Born in Bafatá
- Leopoldina Ross (1976–), Olympic wrestler
- Soares Sambú, politician
- Artur Sanhá (1965–), former Prime Minister
- Malam Bacai Sanhá (1947–2012), former president. Born in Darsalame.
- Mohamed Lamine Sanha (?–2007), Naval Chief of Staff
- José Carlos Schwarz (1945–1977), poet and musician. Born in Bissau.
- Veríssimo Correia Seabra (1947–2004), Army General. Born in Bissau.
- Odete Semedo (1959–), writer and educator
- Abdulai Silá (1958–), engineer and writer. Born in Catió.
- Emílio da Silva (1988–), footballer. Born in Bissau.
- Winston Tang (2006–), Olympic skier
- Bubo Na Tchuto (1949–), former Navy Chief of Staff. Born in Incalá.
- Constantino Teixeira, former Prime Minister
- Filomena Mascarenhas Tipote (1969–), former Foreign Minister
- Domingas Togna (1981–), Olympic runner
- José Mário Vaz (1957–), President. Born in Calequisse.
- Zinha Vaz (1952–), activist and politician. Born in Bissau.
- João Bernardo Vieira (1939–2009), former President. Born in Bissau.
- Batista Tagme Na Waie (1949–2009), former Army Chief of Staff. Born in Catio.
