= History of Guinea-Bissau =

The region now known as Guinea-Bissau, in West Africa, has been inhabited by humans for thousands of years. During the 13th century CE, it was a province of the Mali Empire which later became independent as the empire of Kaabu. The Portuguese Empire claimed the region during the 1450s, but its control was limited to several forts along the coast during most of this period; it gained control of the mainland after a series of "pacification campaigns" from 1912 to 1915, which used military forces to violently crush local resistance. The offshore Bijagos Islands were not colonized until 1936. Guinea-Bissau gained independence from Portugal in 1974. The introduction of multi-party politics in 1991 led to the first multi-party elections in 1994. A civil war broke out in 1998, which lasted until the following year.

== Peoples ==
Although the region's history has not yet been extensively documented with archaeological records, it had a population of hunter-gatherers by 1000 CE. Agriculturists using iron tools soon followed.

The oldest inhabitants were the Jola, Papel, Manjak, Balanta, and Biafada peoples. The Mandinka and Fulani later migrated into the region, pushing the earlier inhabitants towards the coast. A small number of Mandinka had been present in the region as early as the 11th century, but they migrated en masse in the 13th century as Senegambia was incorporated into the Mali Empire by Kaabu founder Tiramakhan Traore. A process of "Mandinkization" followed. The Fulani arrived as early as the 12th century as semi-nomadic herders, but were not a large presence until the 15th century.

The Balanta and Jola had weak (or non-existent) institutions of kingship, with an emphasis on heads of villages and families. The Mandinka, Fula, Papel, Manjak, and Biafada chiefs were vassals of kings with a variety of customs, rites, and ceremonies. Nobles commanded all major positions, however, which included the judicial system. Social stratification was apparent in clothing and accessories, housing materials, and transportation options.

Commerce was widespread among the ethnic groups. Items traded included pepper and kola nuts from the southern forests, iron from the savannah-forest zone, salt and dried fish from the coast, and Mandinka cotton cloth. Products were commonly sold at markets and fairs, held every seven or eight days and sometimes attended by several thousand buyers and sellers from up to 60 miles (97 kilometres) away. Weapons were prohibited in the marketplace, and soldiers were positioned around the area to maintain order throughout the day. Market sections were allocated for specific products except for wine, which could be sold anywhere.

== Pre-colonial kingdoms ==
=== Kaabu ===
==== Origins ====
Kaabu, established in the 13th century, was a province of Mali through the conquest of Senegambia by Tiramakhan Traore (a general of Mali Empire founder Sundiata Keita). According to oral tradition, Tiramakhan Traore invaded the region to punish the Wolof king for insulting Sundiata and went south of the Gambia River into the Casamance. This began a migration of Mandinka into the region. By the 14th century, much of Guinea-Bissau was administered by Mali and ruled by a farim kaabu (commander of Kaabu).

The Empire of Mali began to decline during the 14th century. Formerly-secure possessions in present-day Senegal, the Gambia, and Guinea-Bissau were cut off by the expanding power of Koli Tenguella in the early 16th century. Kaabu became an independent federation of kingdoms, the era's most powerful western Mandinka state.

==== Society ====
Kaabu's ruling classes were composed of elite warriors known as the Nyancho, who traced their patrilineal lineage to Tiramakhan Traore. The Nyancho were reportedly good cavalrymen and raiders. The Kaabu Mansaba was seated in Kansala in the eastern Gabú region region. Malian imperial history was central to Kaabu culture, maintaining its significant institutions and the lingua franca of Mandinka. Individuals from other ethnic backgrounds were assimilated into this dominant culture, and frequent inter-ethnic marriages assisted the process.

The slave trade dominated the economy, enriching the warrior classes with imported cloth, beads, metalware, and firearms. Trade networks to North Africa were dominant until the 14th century, with coastal trade with the Europeans beginning to increase during the 15th century. An estimated 700 enslaved people left the region annually in the 17th and 18th centuries, many from Kaabu.

==== Decline ====
In the late 18th century, the rise of the Imamate of Futa Jallon in the east was a powerful challenge to the animist Kaabu. During the first half of the 19th century, civil war erupted as local Fula people sought independence. This long-running conflict led to the 1867 Battle of Kansala. A Fula army led by Alfa Molo laid siege to the earthen walls of Kansala for 11 days. The Mandinka kept the Fulani from climbing the walls for a time, but were eventually overwhelmed. The Mansaba Dianke Walli, sensing defeat, ordered his troops to set the city's gunpowder on fire; this killed the Mandinka defenders and most of the invading army. Although the loss of Kansala marked the end of the Kaabu empire and the rise of the Fuladu kingdom, smaller Mandinka kingdoms survived until they were absorbed by the Portuguese.

=== Biafada kingdoms ===
The Biafada people inhabited the area around the Rio Grande de Buba in three kingdoms: Biguba, Guinala, and Bissege. The former two were important ports with significant lançado communities, subjects of the Mandinka mansa of Kaabu.

=== Kingdom of Bissau ===
According to oral tradition, the kingdom of Bissau was founded by the son of the king of Quinara (Guinala), who moved to the region with his pregnant sister, his six wives, and the subjects of his father's kingdom. Relations between the kingdom and the Portuguese were initially warm, but deteriorated over time.

The kingdom defended its sovereignty against the Portuguese "pacification campaigns," defeating them in 1891, 1894, and 1904. The Portuguese, under commanded by Teixeira Pinto and warlord Abdul Injai, absorbed Bissau in 1915.

=== Bijagos ===
The Bijagos Islands were inhabited by people with different ethnic origins, leading to cultural diversity in the archipelago. Bijago society was warlike. Men were dedicated to building boats and raiding the mainland, attacking the coastal peoples and other islands. Women cultivated land, constructed houses, and gathered food. They could choose their husbands, generally warriors with the best reputation. Successful warriors could have many wives and boats, and were entitled to one-third of a boat's spoils from any expedition.

Bijago night raids on coastal settlements had a significant impact. Portuguese traders on the mainland tried to stop the raids because they hurt the local economy. The islanders sold a considerable number of slaves to the Europeans, however, who frequently pushed for more captives. The Bijagos, out of the reach of mainland slave traders, were largely safe from enslavement. Portuguese sources say that the children made good slaves but not the adults, who were likely to commit suicide, lead rebellions on slave ships, or escape when they reached the New World.

== European contact ==
=== 15th–16th centuries ===
Lesser coat of arms of Portuguese Guinea-Bissau

The first Europeans to reach Guinea-Bissau were the Venetian explorer Alvise Cadamosto in 1455, Portuguese explorer Diogo Gomes in 1456, Portuguese explorer Duarte Pacheco Pareira in the 1480s, and Flemish explorer Eustache de la Fosse in 1479–1480. The region was known to the Portuguese as the Guinea of Cape Verde, and Santiago was the administrative capital and the source of most of its white settlers.

Although Portuguese authorities initially discouraged European settlement on the mainland, the prohibition was ignored by lançados and tangomãos who assimilated its indigenous culture and customs. They were mainly from impoverished backgrounds, traders from Cape Verde or people exiled from Portugal, often of Jewish or New Christian background. They ignored Portuguese trade regulations which banned entering the region or trading without a royal licence, shipping from unauthorized ports, or assimilating into the native community. In 1520, measures against the lançados were eased in 1520; trade and settlements increased on the mainland, which was populated by Portuguese and native traders and Spanish, Genoese, English, French, and Dutch.

With the region's rivers having no natural harbors, the lançados and native traders navigated river-ways and creeks in small boats purchased from European ships or manufactured locally by trained grumetes (native African sailors, enslaved and free). The main ports were Cacheu, Bissau, and Guinala; each river had trading centers such as Toubaboudougou at their furthest navigable point, which traded with the interior for resources such as gum arabic, ivory, hides, civet, dyes, slaves, and gold. A small number of European settlers established isolated farms along the rivers. Local African rulers generally refused to allow Europeans into the interior, to ensure their control of trade routes.

Europeans were not accepted in all communities, with the Jolas, Balantas, and Bijagos initially hostile. The region's other groups harboured communities of lançados who were subject to taxation and the laws and customs of their community, including the local courts. Disputes became increasingly frequent and serious during the late 1500s as foreign traders tried to influence the host societies to their benefit. Under pressure from hostile locals, the Portuguese abandoned the settlement of Buguendo near Cacheu in 1580 and Guinala in 1583 (where they retreated to a fort). In 1590 they built a fort at Cacheu, which the local Manjaks unsuccessfully stormed shortly after its construction. The poorly-manned and provisioned forts were unable to free the lançados from their responsibilities to the native monarchs (their hosts), who could not expel the traders because their goods were in great demand by the upper class.

The Portuguese monopoly was being increasingly challenged. The 1580 Iberian Union unified the crowns of Portugal and Spain, leading to the attack of Portuguese possessions in Guinea Bissau and Cape Verde by Spain's enemies. French, Dutch, and English ships increasingly traded with the natives and the independent-minded lançados.

=== 17th–18th centuries ===
During the early 17th century, the government unsuccessfully tried to force all Guinean trade to go through Santiago and promote trade and settlement on the mainland while restricting weapons sales to the locals. With the end of the Iberian Union in 1640, King João IV attempted to restrict the Spanish trade in Guinea which had flourished for the previous 60 years. The Afro-Portuguese in Bissau, Guinala, Geba, and Cacheu swore allegiance to the Portuguese king, but were not in a position to deny the free trade that the African kings (who now saw European products as necessities) demanded. In Cacheu, famine had wiped out the slave troops in charge of defending the fort, the water supply remained in Manjak hands and the lançados, their Africanized descendants and the locals were losing customers; Captain-Major Luis de Magalhães lifted the embargo.

Flag of the Portuguese Company of Guinea

In 1641, the Conselho Ultramarino replaced de Magalhães with Gonçalo de Gamboa de Ayala. He had some success winning over local leaders and stopping Spanish ships at Cacheu. In Bissau, however, two Spanish ships were protected by the King of Bissau. Ayala threatened violent repercussions and resettled Geba's Afro-European community to Farim, northeast of Cacheu. The Portuguese could not impose their monopolistic vision on the local and Afro-European traders, since the economic interests of the native leaders and Afro-European merchants never fully aligned with theirs. During this period, the power of the Mali Empire in the region was dissipating and the farim of Kaabu, the king of Kassa and other local rulers began to assert their independence.

In the early 1700s, the Portuguese abandoned Bissau and retreated to Cacheu after the captain-major was captured and killed by the local king. They did not return until the 1750s, and the Cacheu and Cape Verde Company shut down in 1706. For a brief period in the 1790s, the British tried to establish a foothold on Bolama.

=== Slave trade ===
Guinea-Bissau was among the first regions touched by the Atlantic slave trade and, while it did not produce the same number of enslaved people as other regions, the impact was still significant. They were primarily sent to Cape Verde and the Iberian Peninsula at first, with the Madeira and the Canary Islands seeing smaller influxes. Enslaved people were instrumental in developing the plantation economy (particularly in Cape Verde), growing indigo and cotton and weaving panos cloth which became a standard West African currency.

Many slaves from Guinea-Bissau were destined for the Spanish West Indies from 1580 to 1640, with an average of 3,000 per year from Guinala alone. The 17th and 18th centuries saw thousands of people taken from the region every year by Portuguese, French, and British companies. The Fula jihads and wars between the Imamate of Futa Jallon and Kaabu provided many of them.

People were enslaved in four primary ways: as punishment for law-breaking, selling themselves (or relatives) during famines, kidnapped by native marauders or European raiders, or as prisoners of war. Most slaves were bought by Europeans from local rulers or traders. Every ethnicity in the region except for the Balantas and Jolas participated in the trade. Most wars were waged to capture slaves for sale to the Europeans in exchange for imported goods, resembling man-hunts more than conflicts over territory or political power. The nobles and kings benefited, and the common people bore the brunt of the raiding and insecurity. If a noble was captured, they were likely to be released; the captors would generally accept a ransom in exchange. The relationship between kings and European traders was a partnership, with the two making deals about how the trade would be conducted, who would be enslaved, and the prices of slaves. Contemporary chroniclers Fernão Guerreiro and Mateo de Anguiano questioned a number of kings on their part in the slave trade, noting that they recognized the trade as evil but participated because the Europeans would not buy other goods from them.

During the late 18th century, European countries gradually began slowing or abolishing the slave trade. The British navy and, to a half-hearted extent, the U.S. Navy attempted to intercept slavers off the coast of Guinea in the first half of the 19th century. The restriction of supply only increased prices and intensified illegal slave-trading activity. Portugal abandoned slavery in 1869 and Brazil in 1888, replacing it with a system of contract labor which was only marginally better for the workers.

=== Colonialism ===
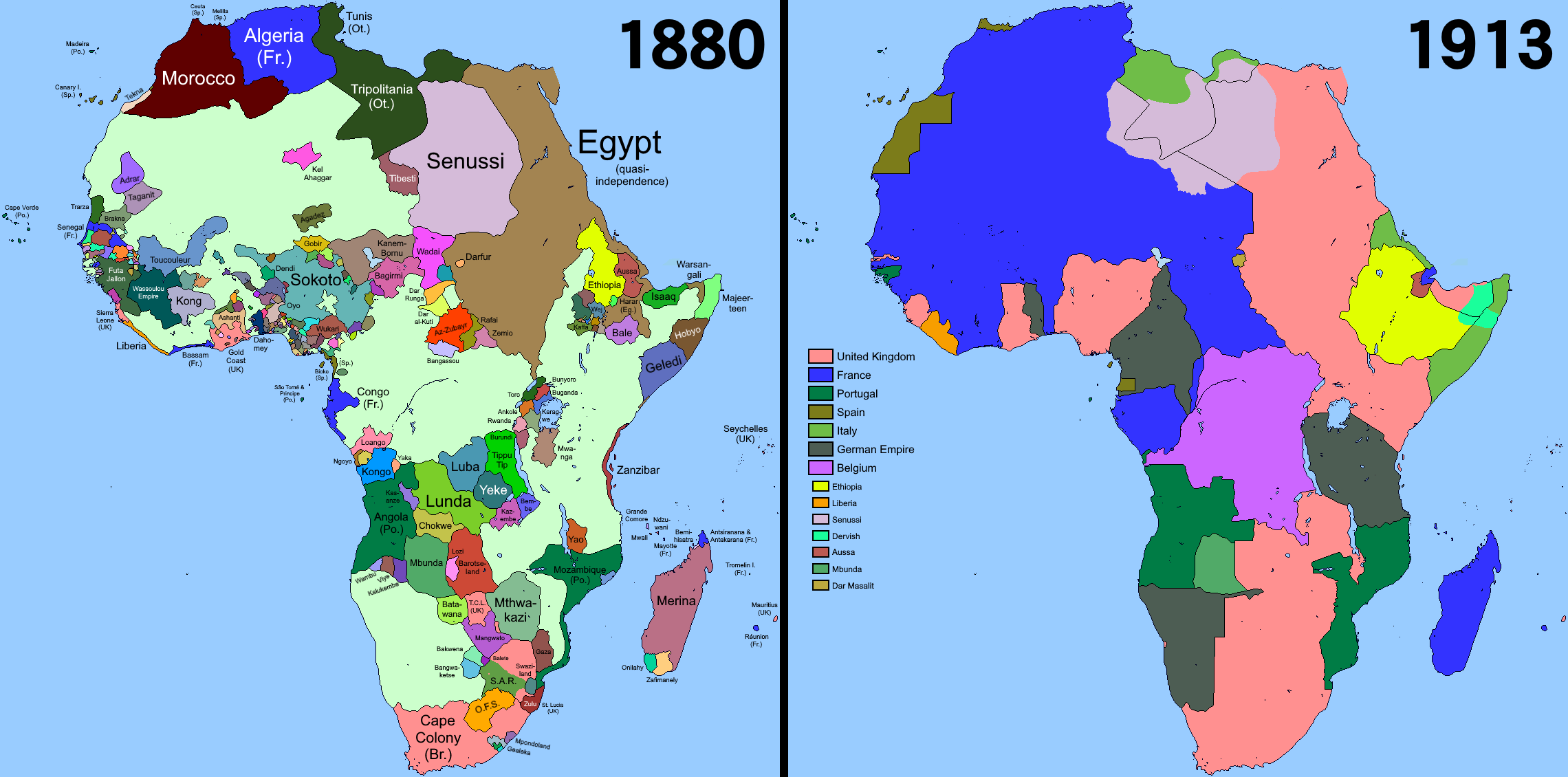
Africa in 1880 and 1913

Until the late 1800s, Portuguese control of their colony outside the forts and trading posts was illusory. African rulers held power in the countryside, and frequent attacks on, and assassinations of, the Portuguese marked the middle decades of the century. Guinea-Bissau began experiencing increased European colonial competition during the 1860s. The dispute over the status of Bolama was resolved in Portugal's favor with mediation by U.S. President Ulysses S. Grant in 1870, but French encroachment on Portuguese claims continued. In 1886, the Casamance region of present-day Senegal was ceded to France.\

Attempting to shore up domestic finances and strengthen the grip on the colony, Minister of Marine and Colonies António José Enes reformed tax laws and granted concessions in Guinea (mainly to foreign companies) to increase exports in 1891. The modest increase in government income, however, did not defray the cost of troops used to collect the taxes. Resistance continued throughout the area, but the reforms laid the groundwork for future military expansion.

To meet the Congress of Berlin standard for "effective occupation", the Portuguese colonial government began a series of largely-unsuccessful "pacification campaigns" until the arrival of Captain João Teixeira Pinto in 1912. Supported by a large mercenary army commanded by Senegalese fugitive Abdul Injai, he quickly and brutally crushed local resistance on the mainland. Three more bloody campaigns in 1917, 1925, and 1936 were required to "pacify" the Bissagos Islands. Portuguese Guinea remained a neglected backwater, with administrative expenses exceeding revenue. In 1951, responding to anti-colonial criticism in the United Nations, the Portuguese government rebranded their colonies (including Portuguese Guinea) as overseas provinces (Províncias Ultramarines).

=== Struggle for independence ===
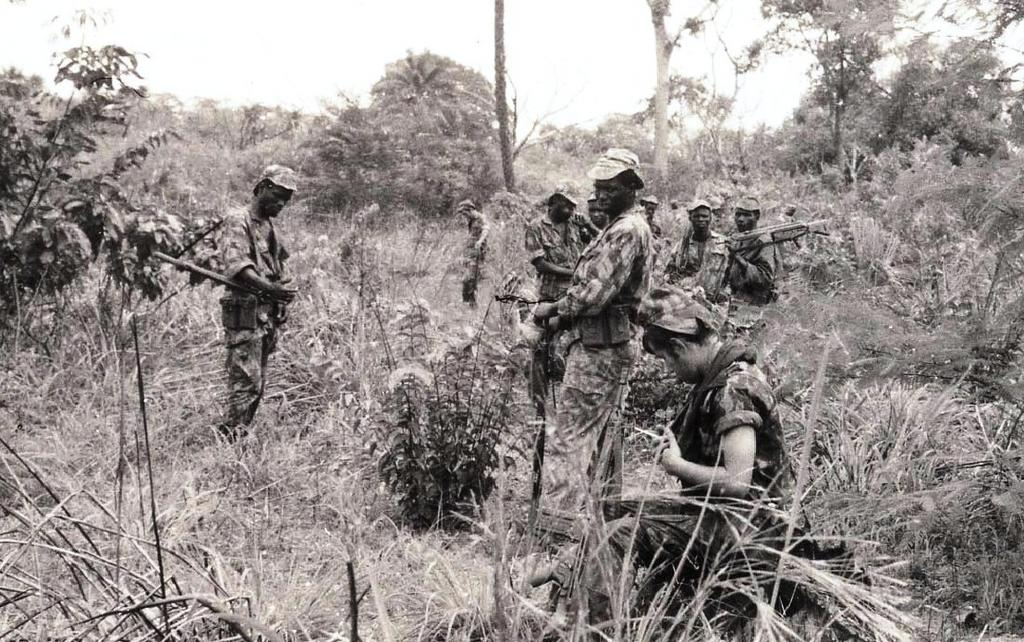
The colonial war in Portuguese Guinea, 1968

The African Party for the Independence of Guinea and Cape Verde (PAIGC) was founded in 1956 and led by Amílcar Cabral. Initially committed to peaceful methods, the 1959 Pidjiguiti massacre pushed the party towards more militarism and relied on the political mobilization of the peasantry. After years of planning and preparing from their base in Conakry, the PAIGC began the Guinea-Bissau War of Independence on 23 January 1963.

Unlike guerrilla movements in other Portuguese colonies, the PAIGC rapidly extended control of large areas. Aided by the jungle terrain, it had easy access to borders with neighbouring allies and large quantities of arms from Cuba, China, the Soviet Union, and left-leaning African countries. Cuba also agreed to supply artillery experts, doctors, and technicians. The PAIGC developed significant anti-aircraft capability to defend against aerial attack. It controlled many parts of Guinea by 1973, although the movement experienced a setback in January of that year when Cabral was assassinated.

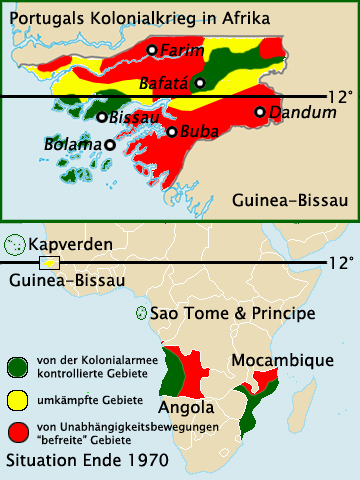
Portuguese-held (green), disputed (yellow), and rebel-held areas (red) in Portuguese Guinea, Angola and Mozambique (1970)

After Cabral's death the party was led by Aristides Pereira, who later became the first president of the Republic of Cape Verde. The PAIGC National Assembly met at Boe, in the southeast, and declared the independence of Guinea-Bissau on 24 September 1973. This was recognized by a 93–7 UN General Assembly vote in November.

== Independence ==
After the April 1974 Carnation Revolution, Portugal granted independence to Guinea-Bissau on 10 September 1974. Luís Cabral, Amílcar Cabral's half-brother, became president. The United States recognized Guinea-Bissau's independence that day.

In late 1980, the government was overthrown in a coup led by prime minister and former armed-forces commander João Bernardo Vieira.

In 1994, 20 years after independence, Guinea-Bissau's first multiparty legislative and presidential elections were held.

=== 1998–1999 civil war ===
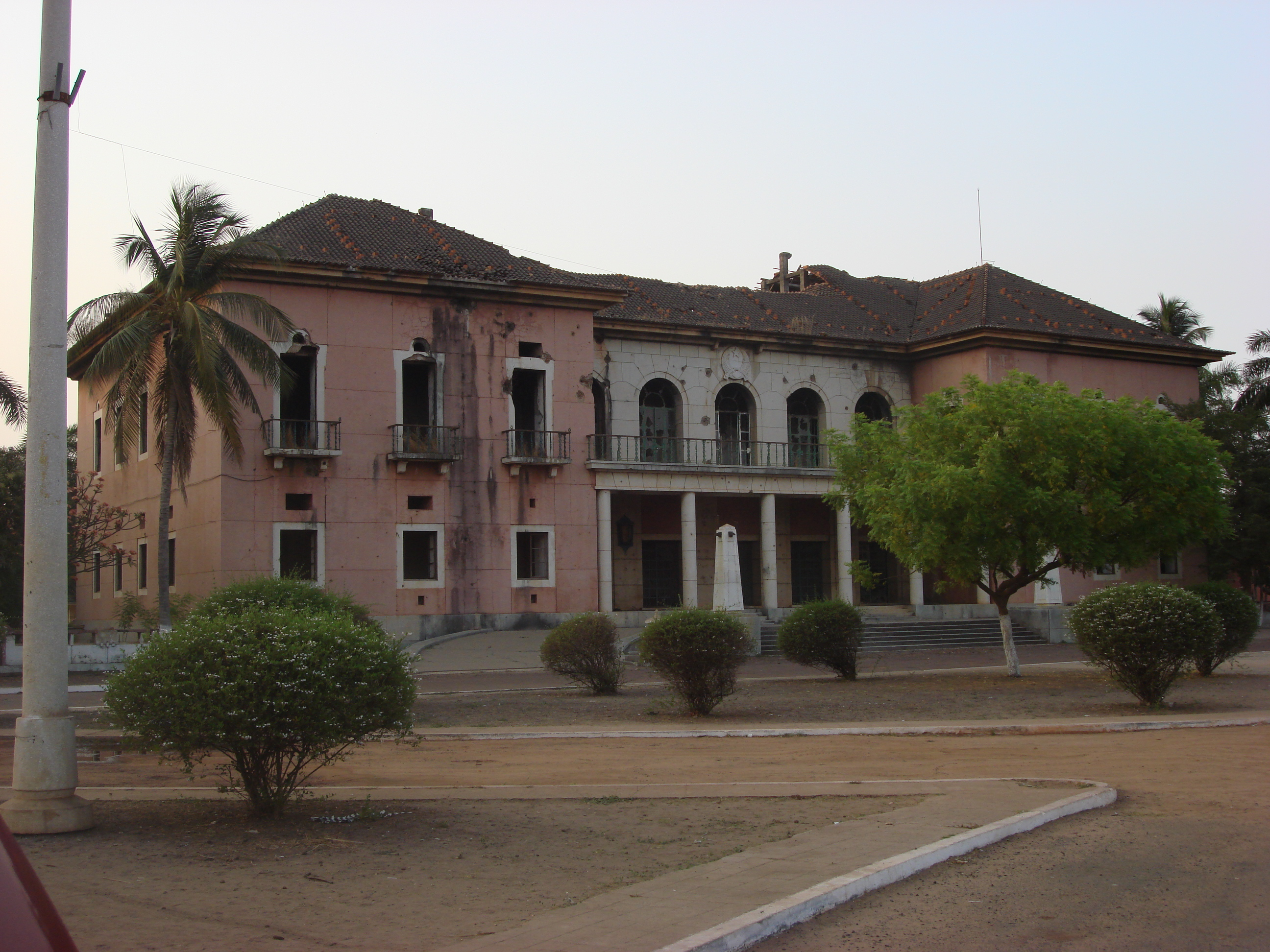
The presidential palace in Bissau (damaged during the 1998–99 civil war) in 2007

An army uprising which triggered the Guinea-Bissau Civil War in 1998 displaced hundreds of thousands of people, and the president was ousted by a military junta on 7 May 1999. An interim government turned over power in February 2000, when opposition leader Kumba Ialá took office after two rounds of transparent presidential elections. Guinea-Bissau's return to democracy has been complicated by an economy devastated by civil war and military interference in government.

=== Presidency of Kumba Ialá ===
In January 2000, the second round of the 1999–2000 Guinea-Bissau general election took place. The presidential election resulted in victory for opposition leader Kumba Ialá of the Party for Social Renewal (PRS), who defeated Malam Bacai Sanhá of the ruling PAIGC. The PRS were also victorious in the National People's Assembly election, winning 38 of 102 seats.

=== 2003 coup ===
In September 2003, a military coup led by Armed Forces Chief of Staff Verissimo Correia Seabra took place. Sitting president Kumba Ialá and Prime Minister Mário Pires were placed under house arrest. After several delays, a legislative election was held in March 2004. A mutiny of military factions in October of that year resulted in Seabra's death, causing widespread unrest.

=== Second presidency of João Bernardo Vieira ===
The 2005 Guinea-Bissau presidential election was held in June for the first time since the 2003 coup. Deposed President Ialá returned as the PRS candidate, saying that he was the country's legitimate president. The election was won by former president João Bernardo Vieira, who was deposed in the 1999 coup and defeated Malam Bacai Sanhá in a run-off election. Sanhá initially refused to concede, saying that electoral fraud occurred in two constituencies (including the capital, Bissau). Despite reports of arms entering the country before the election and "disturbances during campaigning", including attacks on government offices by unidentified gunmen, foreign election monitors described the overall election as "calm and organized".

The PAIGC won a strong parliamentary majority (67 of 100 seats) in the November 2008 parliamentary election. President Vieira's official residence was attacked by members of the armed forces, killing a guard; Vieira was unharmed.

Vieira was assassinated on 2 March 2009 by (according to preliminary reports) a group of soldiers avenging the death of joint chiefs of staff head Batista Tagme Na Wai, who had been killed in an explosion the day before. Vieira's death did not trigger widespread violence, but the advocacy group Swisspeace noted signs of turmoil in the country. Military leaders in Guinea-Bissau pledged to respect the constitutional order of succession. National Assembly Speaker Raimundo Pereira was appointed interim president until the nationwide election on 28 June 2009. It was won by Malam Bacai Sanhá of the PAIGC over PRS candidate Kumba Ialá.

=== 2012 coup ===
On 9 January 2012, President Sanhá died of complications of diabetes and Pereira was again appointed interim president. On the evening of 12 April 2012, members of the country's military staged a coup d'état and arrested Pereira and a leading presidential candidate. Former vice chief of staff Mamadu Ture Kuruma took control of the country and began negotiations with opposition political parties.

=== Presidencies of José Mário Vaz and Umaro Sissoco Embaló ===
José Mário Vaz was president of Guinea-Bissau from 2014 to the 2019 presidential election. At the end of his term, Vaz was the first elected president to complete his five-year mandate. He lost the 2019 election to Umaro Sissoco Embaló, who took office in February 2020. Embaló is the first president elected without PAIGC support.

A February 2022 coup attempt against Embaló failed. According to the president, the attempted coup was linked to drug trafficking. Another coup attempt in 2023 resulted in clashes between government forces and the National Guard. Embaló announced on 11 September 2024 that he would not seek a second term in the presidential election scheduled for November 2025. On 3 March 2025, President Umaro Sissoco Embalo said that he would run for a second term in November, contrary to his earlier vows to step down.

=== 2025 coup ===
A day before the results of the 2025 elections were set to be announced, the military took control of the government. The following day, Horta Inta-A Na Man was proclaimed interim president by the High Military Command for the Restoration of National Security and Public Order.

== See also ==
- Politics of Guinea-Bissau
- United Nations Peacebuilding Support Office in Guinea-Bissau (UNOGBIS)
- City of Bissau history and timeline
