= Filomena Mascarenhas Tipote =

Bissau-Guinean politician

Minister of Defence
- In office 2003–2004

Minister of Foreign Affairs
- In office 2001–2002

Personal details
- Born: 1 March 1969 (age 57)

Filomena Mascarenhas Tipote (born 1 March 1969) is a Guinea-Bissauian politician who served as Minister of Foreign Affairs from 2001 to 2002 and Minister of Defence from 2003 to 2004.

== Career ==
Tipote was appointed Secretary of State by Prime Minister Caetano N'Tchama in 2000. After his resignation on 19 March 2001, she was appointed Minister of Social Solidarity, Employment and Poverty Control by his successor, Faustino Imbali.

Tipote was appointed Foreign Minister by Alamara Nhassé on 9 December 2001, representing Guinea-Bissau at the United Nations General Assembly, and serving in that role until 17 November 2002. On that date, she was appointed Minister of Public Administration, Public Works, Labor and Employment under Mário Pires, but she was dismissed from that role by President Kumba Ialá in January 2003, with no reason given. With another change of government, Tipote was appointed Minister of Defence by Artur Sanhá on 28 September 2003, despite having no military experience. The military leadership did not attend her swearing in ceremony. She was the first woman to hold the office and served until 10 May 2004.

Since 2007, Tipote has worked with the Voz di Paz (Voice of Peace) program, which focuses on giving Guinea-Bissauians a voice in the peacebuilding process.
