= List of ambassadors of Guinea-Bissau to China =

Coordinates: 39.943074°N 116.449207°E

Ambassador of Guinea-Bissau to China
- Inaugural holder: Nicolau Dos Santos
- Formation: February 16, 2001

The Bissau-Guinean ambassador in Beijing is the official representative of the Government in Bissau to the Government of the People's Republic of China.

== List of representatives ==
Designated/accredited	Ambassador	Observations	List of prime ministers of Guinea-Bissau	Premier of the People's Republic of China	Term end
March 15, 1974		Establishment of diplomatic relations	Francisco Mendes	Zhou Enlai	
May 31, 1990		The Governments in Beijing and Bissau suspended diplomatic ties	Victor Saúde Maria	Li Peng	
April 23, 1998		restored ambassadorial level diplomatic ties.	Francisco Fadul	Zhu Rongji	
February 16, 2001	Nicolau Dos Santos	Nicolau dos Santos, Minister of Agriculture	Faustino Imbali	Zhu Rongji	2004
September 3, 2010	Arafan Ansu Câmara		Carlos Gomes Júnior	Wen Jiabao	
October 12, 2012	Malam Sambú	Main financial supporter of Kumba Ialá.. On September 29, 2012 he was accredited.	José Mário Vaz	Wen Jiabao	2020
