= Mamadu Saliu Djaló Pires =

Bissau-Guinean politician

Minister of Foreign Affairs
- Deposed by coup d'état
- In office 2011–2012
- President: Malam Bacai Sanhá, Raimundo Pereira, Mamadu Ture Kuruma, Manuel Serifo Nhamadjo
- Prime Minister: Carlos Gomes Júnior, Adiato Djaló Nandigna, Rui Duarte de Barros
- Preceded by: Adelino Mano Quetá
- Succeeded by: Faustino Imbali

Mamadu Saliu Djaló Pires is the former Minister of Foreign Affairs of Guinea-Bissau.
