= 2003 Guinea-Bissau coup d'état =

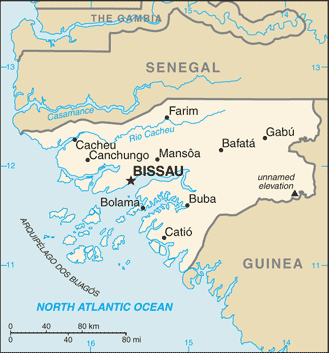
- Map of Guinea-Bissau.
Date	14 September 2003
Location	Bissau, Guinea-Bissau 11°51′N 15°34′W
Result	Coup attempt succeeds with minimum disruption.: President Kumba Ialá removed from office.; General Veríssimo Correia Seabra took control of the country.

Belligerents
Government of Guinea-Bissau: PRS	Military Committee for the Restoration of Constitutional and Democratic Order: Military

Commanders and leaders
Kumba Ialá	Veríssimo Correia Seabra

Casualties and losses
- No casualties reported.
- Nexus of coup in Bissau (marked green), Guinea-Bissau

The 2003 Guinea-Bissau coup d'état was the bloodless military coup that took place in Guinea-Bissau on 14 September 2003, led by General Veríssimo Correia Seabra against incumbent President Kumba Ialá. Seabra referred to the "incapacity" of Ialá's government as justification for the takeover, together with a stagnant economy, political instability, and military discontent over unpaid salaries. Ialá publicly announced his resignation on 17 September, and a political agreement signed that month prohibited him from participating in politics for five years. A civilian-led transitional government led by businessman Henrique Rosa and PRS secretary general Artur Sanhá was set up at the end of September.

== Analysis ==
The coup was largely seen as inevitable due to the deteriorating living conditions and erratic behavior of President Kumba Ialá, which had led to severe political instability and economic mismanagement. Although the international community condemned the unconstitutional seizure of power, there was a general acknowledgment that the coup was a necessary intervention to prevent further chaos, as democratic norms had been repeatedly violated under Ialá's regime.

== See also ==
- History of Guinea-Bissau
- Saloum (film), a 2021 film set during the coup
