= Alamara Nhassé =

Bissau-Guinean politician (born 1957)

Alamara Ntchia Nhassé
- Born: June 2, 1957 (age 68); Guinea-Bissau
- Citizenship: Bissau-Guinean
- Education: Agricultural training in Cuba and the Soviet Union
- Occupations: Politician, agricultural expert
- Years active: 2000–present
- Known for: Prime Minister of Guinea-Bissau (2001–2002)
- Office: Prime Minister of Guinea-Bissau
- Predecessor: Faustino Imbali
- Successor: Mário Pires
- Political party: Social Renewal Party (PRS) – former leader; National Reconciliation Party – current president

Alamara Ntchia Nhassé (born 2 June 1957) is a Bissau-Guinean politician, who was Prime Minister from 9 December, 2001 to 17 November, 2002. Nhassé is currently the President of the National Reconciliation Party. He previously led the Social Renewal Party (PRS).

== Career ==
Nhassé is an agricultural expert, who was trained in Cuba and in the Soviet Union. After PRS candidate Kumba Yala was elected president, Nhassé was appointed as Minister of Agriculture, Water, Forestry and Hunting in the government formed on February 19, 2000. Later, in the government formed on January 25, 2001, he became Minister of Agriculture and Fisheries. Under Prime Minister Faustino Imbali, he became Minister for the Interior after Artur Sanhá was dismissed on August 29, 2001. After Imbali was also dismissed, Nhassé replaced him as prime minister on December 9, 2001. On January 15, 2002, the party convention of the PRS elected him as president of the party. A government crisis then ended his time in office and forced his government to be dissolved. Nhassé resigned as President of the PRS on November 15, 2002, and two days later, Mário Pires was appointed to succeed Nhassé as Prime Minister.

In the 2005 presidential election, Nhassé supported the candidate João Bernardo Vieira. After Vieira's election, Nhassé called for Carlos Gomes Júnior to resign as Prime Minister. Gomes Junior then lost his parliamentary basis after 14 of 45 parliamentary delegates from Gomes' PAIGC left the party.

Nhassé is currently the President of the National Reconciliation Party. It failed to win any seats in the 2008 parliamentary election, and he accepted his party's defeat.

Preceded by Faustino Imbali	Prime Minister of Guinea-Bissau; 2001 - 2002	Succeeded by Mário Pires
