= Guinea coup d'état =

Guinea coup d'état may refer to:

- 1979 Equatorial Guinea coup d'état
- 1980 Guinea-Bissau coup d'état
- 1984 Guinean coup d'état
- 2003 Guinea-Bissau coup d'état
- 2004 Equatorial Guinea coup d'état attempt
- 2008 Guinean coup d'état
- 2010 Guinea-Bissau military unrest
- 2012 Guinea-Bissau coup d'état
- 2021 Guinean coup d'état
