= Vesã Gomes Naluak =

Minister of Justice
- In office 2002–2003
- Prime Minister: Mario Pires
- Preceded by: Carlos Pinto Pereira
- Succeeded by: Raimundo Pereira

Personal details
- Born: 8 March 1964 (age 62) Cacheu, Guinea-Bissau
- Party: Party for Social Renewal
- Education: Kuban State University

Vesã Gomes Naluak (born 8 March 1964, in Cacheu, Guinea Bissau) is an Bissauan politician. He was a Deputy to the Assembly of the Republic, President of the Specialized Commission for Internal Administration, Local Government and National Defense. He was the interim President of Party for Social Renewal.

== Education ==
Vesã Gomes Naluak has a degree in Law from the Faculty of Law of the Kuban State University.

== Government posts ==
- Minister of Justice
- Minister of Energy and Industry
- Deputy of Assembly of Republic
