= List of prime ministers of Guinea-Bissau =

Prime Minister of the Republic of Guinea-Bissau
- Primeiro-Ministro da República da Guiné-Bissau (Portuguese)
- Emblem of Guinea-Bissau

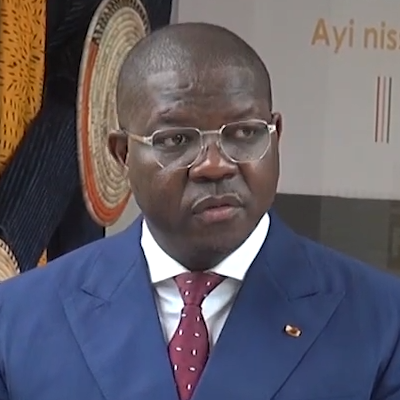
- Incumbent; Ilídio Vieira Té since 28 November 2025
- Status: Head of government
- Seat: Bissau
- Appointer: Transitional President of Guinea-Bissau
- Inaugural holder: Francisco Mendes
- Formation: 24 September 1973; 52 years ago

This article lists the prime ministers of Guinea-Bissau, since the establishment of the office of prime minister in 1973.

Since Guinea-Bissau's unilateral declaration of independence from Portugal on 24 September 1973, there have been twenty-four prime ministers and two acting prime ministers. The current holder of the office is Ilídio Vieira Té, who was appointed by transitional president General Horta Inta-A Na Man on 28 November 2025, following a coup d'état.

== List of officeholders ==
Political parties

African Party for the Independence of Guinea and Cape Verde (PAIGC)
Party for Social Renewal (PRS)
Republican Party for Independence and Development (PRID)
Assembly of the People United (APU)
Movement for Democratic Alternation, Group of 15 (Madem G15)

Other affiliations

Independent

Symbols

Denotes Acting Prime Minister

Symbols

^{†} Died in office

No.	Portrait	Name (Birth–Death)	Election	Term of office			Political party
No.	Portrait	Name (Birth–Death)	Election	Took office	Left office	Tenure	Political party
1		Francisco Mendes (1939–1978) (Note: In exile in Conakry, Guinea until 19 October 1974.)	1976–77	24 September 1973	7 July 1978^{[†]}	4 years, 286 days	PAIGC
2		Constantino Teixeira (1933–1988)	—	7 July 1978	28 September 1978	83 days	PAIGC
3		João Bernardo Vieira (1939–2009) (Note: Deposed President Cabral in the 1980 coup d'état and took control of the country.)	—	28 September 1978	14 November 1980	2 years, 47 days	PAIGC
Vacant (14 November 1980 – 14 May 1982)
4		Victor Saúde Maria (1939–1999) (Note: Fled to Portugal after a power struggle with President Vieira.)	—	14 May 1982	10 March 1984	83 days	PAIGC
Post abolished (10 March 1984 – 27 December 1991)
5		Carlos Correia (1933–2021)	1994	27 December 1991	26 October 1994	2 years, 303 days	PAIGC
6		Manuel Saturnino da Costa (1942–2021)	—	26 October 1994	6 June 1997	2 years, 223 days	PAIGC
(5)		Carlos Correia (1933–2021)	—	6 June 1997	3 December 1998	1 year, 180 days	PAIGC
7		Francisco Fadul (born 1953)	1999	3 December 1998	19 February 2000	1 year, 78 days	Independent
8		Caetano N'Tchama (1955–2007)	—	19 February 2000	19 March 2001	1 year, 28 days	PRS
9		Faustino Imbali (born 1956)	—	21 March 2001	9 December 2001	263 days	Independent
10		Alamara Nhassé (born 1957)	—	9 December 2001	17 November 2002	343 days	PRS
11		Mário Pires (1949–2023)	—	17 November 2002	14 September 2003 (Deposed in a coup)	301 days	PRS
Vacant (14 September 2003 – 28 September 2003)
12		Artur Sanhá (born 1965)	—	28 September 2003	10 May 2004	225 days	PRS
13		Carlos Gomes Júnior (born 1949)	2004	10 May 2004	2 November 2005	1 year, 176 days	PAIGC
14		Aristides Gomes (born 1954)	—	2 November 2005	13 April 2007	1 year, 162 days	PAIGC
15		Martinho Ndafa Kabi (born 1957)	—	13 April 2007	5 August 2008	1 year, 114 days	PAIGC
(5)		Carlos Correia (1933–2021)	—	5 August 2008	2 January 2009	150 days	PAIGC
(13)		Carlos Gomes Júnior (born 1949) (Note: Briefly placed under house arrest by soldiers during the 2010 military unrest.)	2008	2 January 2009	10 February 2012	3 years, 39 days	PAIGC
—		Adiato Djaló Nandigna (born 1958); Acting prime minister	—	10 February 2012	12 April 2012 (Deposed in a coup)	62 days	PAIGC
Vacant (12 April 2012 – 16 May 2012)
—		Rui Duarte de Barros (born 1960); Acting prime minister	—	16 May 2012	3 July 2014	2 years, 48 days	PRS
16		Domingos Simões Pereira (born 1964)	2014	3 July 2014	20 August 2015	1 year, 48 days	PAIGC
17		Baciro Djá (born 1973)	—	20 August 2015	17 September 2015	28 days	PAIGC
(5)		Carlos Correia (1933–2021)	—	17 September 2015	27 May 2016	253 days	PAIGC
(17)		Baciro Djá (born 1973)	—	27 May 2016	18 November 2016	175 days	PAIGC
18		Umaro Sissoco Embaló (born 1972)	—	18 November 2016	30 January 2018	1 year, 73 days	PAIGC
19		Artur Silva (born 1956)	—	30 January 2018	16 April 2018	76 days	PAIGC
(14)		Aristides Gomes (born 1954)	2019	16 April 2018	29 October 2019	1 year, 198 days	PRID
(9)		Faustino Imbali (born 1956)	—	31 October 2019	8 November 2019	10 days	Independent (PMP–affiliated) PRS
(14)		Aristides Gomes (born 1954)	—	8 November 2019	28 February 2020	112 days	PRID
20		Nuno Gomes Nabiam (born 1966)	—	28 February 2020	8 August 2023	3 years, 161 days	APU
21		Geraldo Martins (born 1967)	2023	8 August 2023	21 December 2023	135 days	PAIGC
22		Rui Duarte de Barros (born 1960)	—	21 December 2023	7 August 2025	1 year, 229 days	PAIGC
23		Braima Camará (born 1968)	—	7 August 2025	28 November 2025 (Dismissed following a coup)	113 days	Madem G15
24		Ilídio Vieira Té (born 1983)	—	28 November 2025	Incumbent	283 days	PRS

== See also ==
- Politics of Guinea-Bissau
- List of captains-major of Bissau
- List of captains-major of Cacheu
- List of governors of Portuguese Guinea
- List of presidents of Guinea-Bissau
- Vice President of Guinea-Bissau
