= Mohamed Lamine Sanha =

Mohamed Lamine Sanha (died 6 January 2007) was a Bissau-Guinean Naval Chief of Staff. Sanha was implicated in several attempted coups against the government of Guinea-Bissau. Sanha was an ally of Ansumane Mané, who led the military rebellion against President Nino Vieira in the 1998 civil war.

Sanha was part of the military junta that ousted Vieira. Subsequently, as head of the navy, he released a South Korean ship that had been held on 18 April 2000 for fishing in Guinea-Bissau's waters without permission; he said that he was prepared to face the consequences of this decision. On April 28, 2000 he was dismissed from his post as head of the navy by President Kumba Yala. He refused to leave his post, however, saying that only the armed forces chief of staff could dismiss him. Yala and Mané met to discuss the issue on May 23, and they decided that Sanha should leave the naval base he was occupying and wait for a court to rule on his case; Yala agreed to postpone the appointment of a replacement for Sanha indefinitely. Sanha accordingly left the base on May 26. When fighting broke out between the government and forces loyal to Mané in November 2000, leading to Mané's death, Sanha was arrested by the government and Quirino Spencer was appointed to replace him as naval chief of staff in early 2001.

Sanha and former Army Deputy Chief of Staff Almane Alam Camará were accused of leading a coup attempt that was alleged to have occurred on December 3, 2001 and were arrested. After Tagme Na Wai became Chief of Staff of the Armed Forces, he announced the reintegration of 65 senior officers into the military, including Sanha, on December 1, 2004; Na Wai appointed Sanha as his naval advisor.

Accused of plotting to kill Na Wai and attempt another coup, Sanha was briefly detained in August 2006. According to Sanha, he received death threats. On 4 January 2007, Sanha was shot outside his home in Bissau by men said to have been wearing civilian clothing. He would die of his wounds on 6 January, sparking riots. In a statement on 8 January, the government condemned Sanha's killing and vowed to capture those responsible, but former Prime Minister Carlos Gomes Junior, the President of PAIGC, accused President Vieira of involvement in the murder; as a result, the government issued an arrest warrant for Gomes.

Bissauan civilians in the Bairro Militar District, a suburb of the capital, Bissau, rioted in protest against the killing. The police opened fire on the protesters, killing one man.

Two suspects, Bubacar Seidi dit Imba Seidi and Dauda Tcham, were arrested. They have denied guilt.
