= Carlos Correia =

Prime Minister of Guinea-Bissau (1991–1994; 1997–1998; 2008–2009; 2015–2016)

5th Prime Minister of Guinea-Bissau
- In office 17 September 2015 – 12 May 2016
- President: José Mário Vaz
- Preceded by: Baciro Djá
- Succeeded by: Baciro Djá
- In office 6 August 2008 – 2 January 2009
- President: João Bernardo Vieira
- Preceded by: Martinho Ndafa Kabi
- Succeeded by: Carlos Gomes
- In office 6 June 1997 – 3 December 1998
- President: João Bernardo Vieira
- Preceded by: Manuel Saturnino da Costa
- Succeeded by: Francisco Fadul
- In office 27 December 1991 – 26 October 1994
- President: João Bernardo Vieira
- Preceded by: Victor Saúde Maria
- Succeeded by: Manuel Saturnino da Costa

Personal details
- Born: 6 November 1933 Bissau, Portuguese Guinea, Portugal (now Guinea-Bissau)
- Died: 14 August 2021 (aged 87)
- Party: African Party for the Independence of Guinea and Cape Verde

Carlos Correia (6 November 1933 – 14 August 2021) was a Bissau-Guinean politician who was Prime Minister of Guinea-Bissau from 17 September 2015 to 12 May 2016. Previously he was Prime Minister from 27 December 1991 to 26 October 1994, from 6 June 1997 to 3 December 1998, and from 5 August 2008 to 25 December 2008.

== Biography ==
Correia was born in Bissau on 6 November 1933. He was trained in East Germany as an agricultural engineer. During Guinea-Bissau's war for independence, Correia was a member of the African Party for the Independence of Guinea and Cape Verde (PAIGC), which ruled the country until 1999. In the administration of Francisco Mendès in the 1970s, Correia was Minister of Finance. In the 1980s, he was a member of the Politburo of the PAIGC and responsible for agriculture and fishery in the state council.

When the office of Prime Minister was created again after having been abolished in 1984, Correia became Prime Minister on 27 December 1991 under President João Bernardo Vieira. After the first multiparty presidential and parliamentary elections in July 1994, which the PAIGC won, Manuel Saturnino da Costa succeeded him as head of government on 27 October.

After da Costa's discharge on 26 May 1997, Correia became Prime Minister once again on 6 June. However, in October of the same year the highest court of the country ruled that Correia's nomination was unconstitutional, because parliament had not been consulted. A week later, his nomination was approved. Correia's work as Prime Minister was well regarded by the International Monetary Fund and the World Bank.

Correia's second term in office, which lasted until 3 December 1998, was overshadowed by the rebellion of Ansumane Mané. Mané was dismissed as chief of staff of the armed forces in June 1998, which led him to rebel against the government and start the civil war, which lasted until a peace agreement between the government and rebels was signed in November 1998. The agreement lasted for six months.

After Vieira was overthrown in May 1999, Attorney-General Amin Saad announced on 27 July 1999 that Correia and 14 other supporters of Vieira had been arrested and charged with inciting warfare and providing financial support to Vieira; however, he was only incarcerated for a short time. At a PAIGC congress in September 1999, he was expelled from the party, along with Vieira and five other former ministers. After Kumba Ialá took office as president, Correia was arrested, along with da Costa and four other former ministers, in February 2000. It was alleged that two government bonds were issued without parliamentary approval three years prior; according to Correia and da Costa, who were released on bail, the bonds were intended to provide funds for national development. He was acquitted of embezzlement in June 2003.

In February 2003, Correia and four other members of the PAIGC were arrested for the execution of five people after a failed coup d'etat in 1986, but he was released four days later.

In 2005, he was initially considered as a presidential candidate for his party, but Malam Bacai Sanhá was nominated instead. Sanhá later lost to Vieira in a run-off vote.

Vieira dissolved the National People's Assembly and appointed Correia as Prime Minister again on 5 August 2008, replacing Martinho Ndafa Kabi. Correia was tasked with leading the government as it prepared for a legislative election in November 2008. A new government headed by Correia was appointed on 9 August; aside from Correia himself, it included 21 ministers and seven secretaries of state. This government was dominated by Vieira loyalists and members of PAIGC, including PAIGC dissidents who were supporters of Vieira. The Party for Social Renewal (PRS) was given five posts in the government, while the Republican Party for Independence and Development (PRID) and the United People's Alliance (APU) were each given a single post.

Following the election, in which PAIGC won a parliamentary majority (67 out of 100 seats), Vieira appointed PAIGC President Carlos Gomes Junior to replace Correia on 25 December 2008.

Seven years later, amidst a dispute between President Jose Mario Vaz and PAIGC, his own party, Correia was again appointed Prime Minister and sworn in on 17 September 2015. A new government headed by Correia was appointed on 13 October 2015. As he and Vaz had still not agreed on who should head the ministries for the interior and natural resources, Correia temporarily took responsibility for those portfolios. On 12 May 2016, Correia was dismissed from his post by the President. Speaking on 27 May, Correia criticized the move, calling it "a constitutional coup d'etat". Correia died on 14 August 2021 at the age of 87.

Political offices
Preceded by Victor Saúde Maria	Prime Minister of Guinea-Bissau; 1991–1994	Succeeded by Manuel Saturnino da Costa
Preceded by Manuel Saturnino da Costa	Prime Minister of Guinea-Bissau; 1997–1998	Succeeded by Francisco Fadul
Preceded by Martinho Ndafa Kabi	Prime Minister of Guinea-Bissau; 2008–2009	Succeeded by Carlos Gomes
Preceded by Baciro Djá	Prime Minister of Guinea-Bissau; 2015–2016	Succeeded by Baciro Djá
