= Manuel Saturnino da Costa =

Bissau-Guinean politician (1942–2021)

Manuel Saturnino da Costa (29 November 1942 – 10 March 2021) was a Bissau-Guinean politician who served as Prime Minister of Guinea-Bissau from 26 October 1994 to 6 June 1997.

== Biography ==
From 1977 he was in the Foreign Office, as the ambassador in Cuba and the USSR.

During the presidency of João Bernardo Vieira, who had come to power in 1980 through a coup, he became General Secretary of the PAIGC.

Following the victory of the PAIGC in the 1994 parliamentary election, Vieira appointed Saturnino da Costa, who was then Secretary-General of PAIGC, as Prime Minister on 25 October 1994. Da Costa formed a government on 18 November that was almost entirely composed of PAIGC members, although one post was given to the Bafata Movement.

Following the ouster of President Vieira in May 1999, da Costa was named acting President of PAIGC on 12 May 1999. Francisco Benante was elected to replace him as PAIGC President in September 1999.

After Kumba Ialá took office as President, da Costa was arrested, along with another former Prime Minister, Carlos Correia (who both preceded and succeeded him as Prime Minister), and four other former ministers, in February 2000. It was alleged that two government bonds were issued without parliamentary approval three years prior; according to Saturnino da Costa and Correia, who were released on bail, the bonds were intended to provide funds for national development. He was acquitted of embezzlement in June 2003.

In the November 2008 legislative election, PAIGC won a majority of 67 out of 100 seats in the National People's Assembly, and Saturnino da Costa was elected to a seat as a PAIGC candidate in the first constituency, Catio e Como. Following the election, he was appointed Minister of the Presidency of the Council of Ministers on January 7, 2009.

Saturnino da Costa sought the nomination as PAIGC's candidate for the June 2009 presidential election, but in a vote on April 25, 2009, the PAIGC Central Committee chose Malam Bacai Sanhá as the party's candidate. He was replaced in his post as Minister of the Presidency of the Council of Ministers and dismissed from the government on October 28, 2009.

Saturnino da Costa died on 10 March 2021 in Bissau, aged 78.

Political offices
Preceded by Carlos Correia	Prime Minister of Guinea-Bissau; 26 October 1994 – 6 June 1997	Succeeded by Carlos Correia
