= Baciro Dabó =

Bissau-Guinean politician (1958–2009)

Minister of Territorial Administration of the Republic of Guinea-Bissau
- In office 7 January 2009 – May 2009

Personal details
- Born: 12 March 1958
- Died: 5 June 2009 (aged 51)
- Party: African Party for the Independence of Guinea and Cape Verde (PAIGC)

Major Baciro Dabó (12 March 1958 – 5 June 2009) was a Bissau-Guinean politician. Considered to have been a close ally of President João Bernardo "Nino" Vieira, he served as Minister of Territorial Administration and was standing as a candidate in the June 2009 presidential election when he was killed by security forces, allegedly because he was involved in a coup plot.

== Life and career ==
Dabó had been a singer and a journalist before entering politics. As head of President Kumba Yala's personal security, he announced in February 2001 that a plot to kill Yala upon his return from medical treatment in Portugal and "foment an ethno-religious war" had been foiled and that the plotters had been arrested. Soon afterwards, Yala dismissed Dabó from his post on 27 February 2001 without explanation. As of 2002, Dabó was an official at the Ministry of the Interior.

Dabó was a senior member of the governing African Party for the Independence of Guinea and Cape Verde (PAIGC) and a close ally of President Vieira. He was appointed as secretary of state for public order on 9 November 2005, serving in that position until Mamadu Saico Djalo was appointed to replace him on 28 July 2006; subsequently he was appointed as Vieira's Information Adviser in late November 2006.

When a three-party coalition government hostile to Vieira was appointed in mid-April 2007, Dabó was included in the government as Minister of Internal Administration; he was the only minister in the government who was considered a close ally of Vieira. Vieira dismissed him from that post in October 2007; some suggested that he was dismissed due to pressure from opposition leaders and military officials. Following the November 2008 parliamentary election, Dabó regained a position in the government as Minister of Territorial Administration on 7 January 2009.

Dabó was reportedly known for having a "flamboyant lifestyle", and rumors suggested that he was involved in the drug trade, which is pervasive in Guinea-Bissau.

Vieira was assassinated by members of the armed forces on 2 March 2009; the soldiers killed him in retaliation for an explosion which killed Chief of Staff Batista Tagme Na Wai. There had been a long and violent feud between Vieira and Na Wai. No one was prosecuted for the killing and a presidential election was scheduled for 28 June to select a new president. Dabó resigned from PAIGC and as a minister in mid-May 2009 to put himself forward as an independent candidate and became one of 13 candidates contesting the election. Election campaigning was due to open on 6 June.

== Death ==
His supporters say that between 3:30 and 4 am (local and GMT) on 5 June 2009 a group of around 30 uniformed and armed soldiers arrived at his home and demanded to see him. The soldiers were then said to have shot their way to Dabó's bedroom where he was asleep in bed with his wife, injuring some of his six-member security team in the process. The soldiers are then alleged to have shot Dabó several times, killing him instantly. According to Agence France-Presse, a "medical source" told them that Dabó had suffered three AK-47 bullet wounds to the abdomen and one to the head, fired from short range.

The Guinea-Bissauan authorities present a different series of events and say that he died in an exchange of fire whilst resisting arrest over an alleged coup plot. Former defence minister Hélder Proença was also reported to have been killed on a road between Bula and Bissau alongside his driver and a bodyguard. Several other PAIGC politicians have been detained by security forces as part of the coup investigation. The Guinea-Bissauan state intelligence service says that the coup's aims were "physically eliminating the head of the armed forces, overthrowing the interim head of state and dissolving the national assembly".

It has been suggested by journalist Jean Gomis and reported by the BBC that he may have been killed on the orders of military leaders who feared prosecution over the assassination of President Vieira had Dabó won the election. Analysts consulted by the Reuters news agency stated that if a power vacuum occurs, Latin American drug cartels may be able to extend their influence over the country, which serves as a port for the shipping of cocaine to Europe. United Nations Secretary-General Ban Ki-moon said that he was "concerned about the emerging pattern of killings of high-profile personalities in Guinea-Bissau" and stressed "the importance and urgency of conducting a thorough, credible and transparent investigation into the circumstances" of the killings.

The United Nations Security Council condemned the killings of Dabó and Proença "in the strongest terms" on 9 June. Both the UN and the African Union urged the election to proceed on schedule, however.

== See also ==
- History of Guinea-Bissau
