= Idrissa Djaló =

Bissau-Guinean politician

Idrissa Djaló (born 6 January 1962) is a Bissau-Guinean politician and leader of the National Unity Party (PUN).

Djaló, an entrepreneur, founded the PUN on July 26, 2001. Running as the PUN candidate in the 19 June 2005 presidential election, Djaló placed 8th out of 13 candidates, receiving 0.81% of the vote. He was the youngest candidate in the election.
