= Adiato Djaló Nandigna =

Bissau-Guinean politician (born 1958)

Prime Minister of Guinea-Bissau Acting
- In office 10 February 2012 – 12 April 2012
- President: Raimundo Pereira (Acting)
- Preceded by: Carlos Gomes
- Succeeded by: Rui Duarte de Barros (Acting)

Personal details
- Born: 6 November 1958 (age 68) Guinea-Bissau
- Party: African Party for the Independence of Guinea and Cape Verde

Adiato Djaló Nandigna (born 6 November 1958) is a Bissau-Guinean politician and a former acting Prime Minister of Guinea-Bissau. Her government was overthrown in the 2012 Guinea-Bissau coup d'état, and she was arrested by the security services in 2013. She later returned as the Minister of Defence in the 2015 cabinet of Prime Minister Carlos Correia.

== Political career ==
By 2008, Nandigna was serving as the Minister for Culture, Youth and Sports within the government of Guinea-Bissau.

She was acting Prime Minister of Guinea-Bissau from 10 February to 12 April 2012. She was the first prime minister appointed by her predecessor (as the interim president can not appoint the prime minister) and also the first female holder of the office. She also served as the government's spokeswoman. She had previously been the Minister for Communications under Prime Minister Carlos Gomes Júnior, who resigned his office in order to campaign for the vacant Presidency following the death of Malam Bacai Sanhá.

She was deposed in a coup d'état, along with the Acting President Raimundo Pereira and other civilian government members. During the coup, she came under fire directly.

Nandigna was arrested on 21 November 2013 by the Guinea-Bissau intelligence and security services, a move which was criticised by the Guinean Human Rights League.

After becoming an adviser to President José Mário Vaz, she was named to the post of Minister of Defence in 2015 under acting Prime Minister Carlos Correia. She continued in this role in 2016, when she spoke of the difficulties in tackling drug smuggling around the Bissagos Islands.

Political offices
Preceded by Carlos Gomes	Prime Minister of Guinea-Bissau; Acting; 2012	Succeeded by Rui Duarte de Barros; Acting
