= Odete Semedo =

Writer and educator from Guinea-Bissau

Maria Odete da Costa Semedo
- Born: 7 November 1959 (age 66); Bissau, Guinea-Bissau
- Education: Universidade Nova de Lisboa
- Occupations: Writer, teacher

Maria Odete da Costa Semedo (born 7 November 1959 in Bissau) is a writer and educator from Guinea-Bissau. She works in both in Portuguese and Guinea Creole.

== Early life ==
Odete Semedo was born in Bissau on 7 November 1959 in what was then Portuguese Guinea. She completed her secondary studies at the National Lyceum Kwame N'Krumah.

She graduated in Modern Languages and Literatures from the Faculty of Social and Human Sciences of the Universidade Nova de Lisboa, in the academic year 1989/1990.

Upon returning to the country, in 1990, she assumed the National Coordination of the Portuguese Language Project in Secondary Education, financed by the Calouste Gulbenkian Foundation. In the same period, she was invited to take over as Director of the College Tchico-Té (in Portuguese: Escola Normal Superior Tchico-Té); at the same time, she worked as a teacher.

She is the founder of the journal Revista de Letras, Artes e Cultura Tcholona, and has published two books of poetry, Entre o Ser e o Amar and No Fundo do Canto. She works in Bissau as a researcher in the fields of education and training at the Instituto Nacional de Estudos e Pesquisas.

== Political career ==
From 1995 onwards, Semedo rose to several prominent positions, assuming the roles of Director-General of Education of Guinea, president of the National Commission for UNESCO - Bissau, Minister of National Education (June 1997 to February 1999) and Minister of Health (March 2004 to November 2005).

At the invitation of Rui Duarte de Barros and Manuel Serifo Nhamadjo, she took over, on 8 January 2013, as dean of the University Amilcar Cabral, being the first after the restructuring of the institution. She remained in these roles until 20 September 2014, when Zaida Correia replaced her.

== Works ==
- Entre o Ser e o Amar (1996), poetry
- Histórias e passadas que ouvi contar (2003)
- No Fundo Do Canto (2007), poetry
- Guiné-Bissau – Historia, Culturas, Sociedade e Literatura (2010)
- Literaturas da Guiné-Bissau – Cantando os escritos da história (2011)
