= Fatumata Djau Baldé =

Bissau-Guinean politician

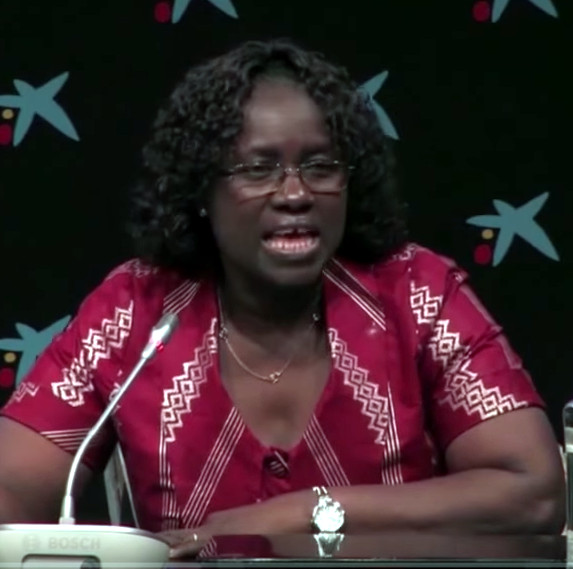
- pictured in 2015
- Occupation: Politician

Fatumata Djau Baldé was a Guinea-Bissau Minister of Foreign Affairs until there was a coup in September 2003.

She has taken a number of roles in the government of Guinea Bissau. She has been the Secretary of State of Social Solidarity and Employment, Minister for Tourism and Minister for Foreign Affairs. She was minister for Foreign affairs in the elected president Kumba Yala's government, but her rule was brief as there was a military coup in September 2003.
