= Abdulai Silá =

Guinea-Bissau novelist (born 1958)

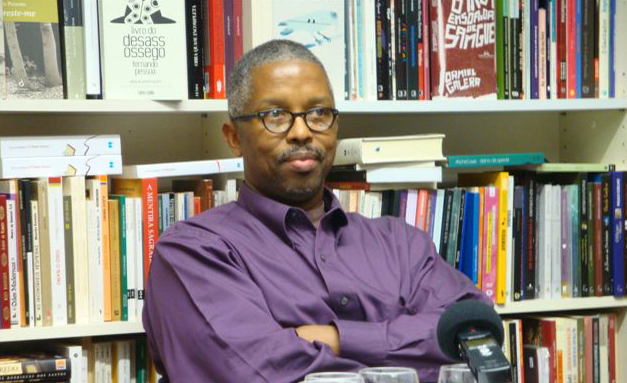
in 2018

Abdulai Silá (also Silla, Sila; born 1 April 1958 in Catió), is a Guinea-Bissauan engineer, economist, social researcher and writer. He is the author of three novels: Eterna Paixão (1994), A Última Tragédia (1995) and Mistida (1997), the first of which was the first novel published in Guinea-Bissau.

== Early years ==
He attended primary school in Catió and, in 1970, moved to Bissau to attend high school at National Lyceum Kwame N'Krumah. From 1979–85, he attended Technical University of Dresden (Germany), where he graduated in Electrical Engineering. From 1986, he studied computer networking, Cisco networking, LAN management, and Internet security in the United States and elsewhere.

== Career ==
Silá has carved a career in both engineering and writing. He is co-manager of SITEC (Silá Technologies), a computer company he created in 1987 and managed jointly with his brother. He is also the Co-Founder and Chairman of Eguitel Communications, the only private ISP in Guinea-Bissau. Under the leadership of Silá, Eguitel has played a significant role in the development and diffusion of Information and Communications in Guinea-Bissau, undertaking several initiatives to make these technologies accessible and affordable throughout the country.

Silá is also a writer. In addition to authoring technical articles on appropriated technology, energy, and communication issues, Silá has written three novels; Eterna Paixão ("Eternal Passion") (1994), A Última Tragédia (1995) and Mistida (1997). Characterized as a "postcolonial myth, parable, and fable", Eterna Paixão was the first ever novel to be written and published in Guinea-Bissau. In the novel, he provides a critique of the political regime in the country since independence from Portugal. His ability to illustrate images, situations and characters and represent the political situation in the country in Mistida was acclaimed. He also wrote the play As Orações de Mansat, a drama inspired by William Shakespeare's Macbeth, in 2007. Like the songwriter and poet José Carlos Schwarz and the novelist Filinto de Barros, Silá self-identifies as a voice of the underprivileged. His works are published by Kusimon Editora.

== Personal life ==
Silá is married and has three children. He lives in Bissau where he is Vice President of the Hand Ball Federation and is the Honorary President for several other organizations. His hobbies include playing soccer and fishing.
