= National Unity Party (Guinea-Bissau) =

The National Unity Party (Portuguese: Partido da Unidade Nacional, PUN) was a political party in Guinea-Bissau.

== History ==
The party was established by Idrissa Djaló on 26 July 2001. In the 2004 parliamentary elections, the party received 1.46% of the vote and failed to win a seat. In the 2005 presidential election, Djaló finished eighth with 0.81% of the vote.

The party boycotted the 2008 parliamentary elections, with Djaló claiming that "the ballot will not resolve any of the persistent great problems in the country". It did not contest presidential elections in 2009 or 2012, but supported the 2012 military coup.
