= Adelino Mano Quetá =

Bissau-Guinean politician

Adelino Mano Quetá (1943 or 1944 – 14 June 2014) was a Guinea-Bissauan politician and diplomat. Quetá ran as an independent in the 2005 Guinea-Bissau presidential election, where he finished ninth in a field of thirteen candidates. He was appointed foreign minister in 2009, replacing Adiato Diallo Nandigna.

== Career ==
Quetá was Attorney General of Guinea-Bissau in 1985. From 1997 to 1998, he was the ambassador to Morocco, Italy, Spain and Taiwan. From 1999 to 2000, he was ambassador to Portugal. In the run-up to the 2005 presidential election, Quetá was diplomatic advisor to interim President Henrique Rosa and lecturer at Amílcar Cabral University in Bissau.

He died on 14 June 2014, in Bissau.
