= Da Silva (footballer, born 1988) =

Bissau-Guinean footballer

Personal information
- Full name: Emílio da Silva
- Date of birth: 2 May 1988 (age 38)
- Place of birth: Bissau, Guinea-Bissau
- Height: 1.85 m (6 ft 1 in)
- Position: Defender

Team information
- Current team: Fátima
- Number: 23

Senior career*
Years	Team	Apps	(Gls)
2006–2007	Atlético Reguengos		
2007–2008	Las Norias		
2008–2010	Eléctrico	28	(2)
2010	Caniçal	8	(1)
2010–2011	Bragança	16	(1)
2011–2013	Pinhalnovense	39	(1)
2013	Lourinhanense	14	(1)
2013–2014	Atlético CP	11	(0)
2014–	Fátima	5	(1)

International career^{‡}
2014–	Guinea-Bissau	1	(0)
- * Club domestic league appearances and goals as of 07:49, 10 October 2014 (UTC) ‡ National team caps and goals as of 07:49, 10 October 2014 (UTC)

Emílio Da Silva (born 2 May 1988) is a Bissau-Guinean footballer who plays for Fátima in Portugal as a defender

== Career ==
Da Silva started his career in Portugal with Atlético Reguengos and soon had a stint with Spanish fifth tier club Las Norias. He made his professional debut with Atlético CP in 2013. The following year he signed for Fátima.

Da Silva made his international debut against Botswana.
