= Rajeshwar Prasad =

Government official in Guinea-Bissau

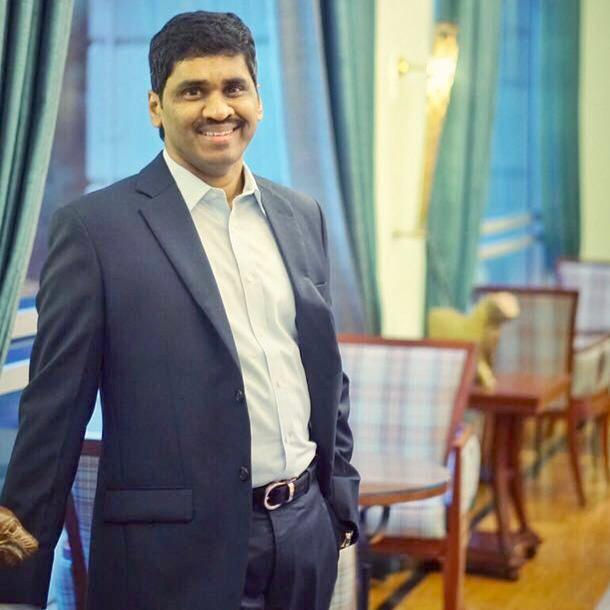
Rajeshwar Prasad

Rajeshwar Prasad (born 21 September 1968) is Ex-Officio Cabinet Minister and Special Advisor to the Prime Minister, Republic of Guinea-Bissau. He is also the CEO of RAK Sovereign Holding LLC, a royal family investment holding conglomerate and Director of Idein Ventures PLC with Ashwin Srivastava.

== Life and career ==
Rajeshwar is a technopreneur with management or investment experience in multiple companies since 1988. He is involved in businesses of retail stores across UAE; jute, minerals, power projects in India; agriculture across Africa and Middle East; startup investments globally; and other investments in billion dirham companies.

Rajeshwar Prasad is also on the board of a number of companies in India, Middle East, Africa and other locations globally. Bangalore based virtual reality startup Infurnia is one of his investments. In August 2016 he visited Tirupati, India on business and personal matters as covered by major regional newspapers.

In May 2021, he was a part of the group of world leaders who were special guests for the revelation of the earliest surviving Hindu painting.

== See also ==
- Politics of Guinea-Bissau
