= Helder Proença =

Guinea-Bissauan politician

Helder Proença Minister of Defense
- Died: June 5, 2009; Bula
- Occupation: Politician
- Political party: National People's Assembly

Helder Proença (died June 5, 2009) was a Guinea-Bissauan politician who served as Minister of Defense of Guinea-Bissau during the administration of President João Bernardo Vieira.

On June 5, 2009, Proença, who was a member of the National People's Assembly at the time, was shot and killed by government security forces on a road connecting the northern town of Bula and with Bissau, the capital city of Guinea-Bissau. Baciro Dabó, a politician and presidential candidate in the June 2009 presidential election, was also killed by government soldiers on the same day. A third politician, former Prime Minister Faustino Imbali, was also arrested. Proença's driver and bodyguard were also killed in the attack.

In a statement, the Interior Ministry of Guinea-Bissau accused Proença, Dabó and Embali of being part of the alleged coup plot.

Portugal's state-run news agency, Lusa, reported that Proenca's body was taken to the morgue at the Simao Mendes Hospital in Bissau following his killing.
