= Manifest Party of the People =

Political party in Guinea-Bissau

The Manifest Party of the People (Portuguese: Partido do Manifesto do Povo, PMP) is a political party in Guinea-Bissau.

== History ==
The PMP was established in 2003 by Faustino Imbali. The party received 0.8% of the vote in the 2004 parliamentary elections, failing to win a seat in the National People's Assembly. Imbali was the party's candidate for the 2005 presidential elections, but received just 0.52% of the vote, finishing tenth in a field of 13 candidates.

The party did not contest elections in 2008, 2009 or 2012, but returned to active politics when it ran in the 2014 parliamentary elections, receiving 0.7% of the vote and failing to win a seat. It received 0.1% of the vote in the 2019 and 2023 elections, remaining without parliamentary representation.
