= Abdul Injai =

Senegalese mercenary

- Born: Ziguinchor, Senegal
- Died: Cape Verde
- Military career
- Allegiance: Mercenary

Abdul Injai or Abdoul Ndaiye was a Senegalese mercenary in colonial Portuguese Guinea at the turn of the 20th century.

== Alliance with Portugal ==
A Muslim Wolof, Abdul Injai initially came to notice while assisting in the punitive military missions of Portuguese colonialists Oliveira Musanty and Teixeira Pinto, from 1905 to 1915. This era was the beginning of a Portuguese campaign against the animist tribes of the interior, with the help of the indigenous coastal Islamic population. It would not be until 1936 that areas like the Bijagos Islands would be under complete government control. Tenuous alliances, like those between Abdul Injai and the Portuguese during the Scramble for Africa, reflect the overwhelming tendency for European colonial powers to attempt to divide native African populations based on religious affiliations - particularly the idea that, although racially inferior to Europeans, Muslim Africans possessed higher levels of education and culture and were preferential associates compared to followers of animist or tribal religions.

An outraged Portuguese lawyer later published a damning report on the atrocities committed by African mercenaries under the command of Abdul Injai and Pinto:

"Numerous bands, in which were also found the old, the crippled, women and children, fled, terrorized in the face of the triumphant march of the force of the irregulars [the mercenaries]. And in the disorderly flight, numerous natives, men, women, old people, children and the crippled, perished, drowned in the river, and ... mercilessly killed by the same irregulars. Then followed assaults on the tabancas [villages], these being sacked and burned; their undefended inhabitants were slaughtered; the fields were devastated totally destroyed.... Today, the rich and extensive territory inhabited by Pepels is in the greatest desolation and misery."

Having assisted the Portuguese in the conquest of several native groups from 1914-1915, Injai began to consolidate his power in the Oio region, where Portuguese influence was limited, allowing for him to do as he pleased and act independent of the government. Eventually, the people of Oio paid more attention to the demands of Injai then the government, who terrorized the locals. His mercenary Senegalese army stayed independent there for four years, not only threatening the Portuguese and Oio locals, but also the French administration in Senegal, who feared a return of the mercenary army would lead to conflict in Senegal.

== Downfall and conflict with the Portuguese ==
In 1919, Injai demanded the Portuguese government to disarm several northern provinces, which they refused. Tensions continued to rise as Injai's army sabotaged Portuguese control by cutting telegraph wires and harassing Portuguese officials. The colonial governor dispatched all available troops to Mansaba, as well as several armed boats upriver, to destroy Injai's army. From August 1–2, colonial forces engaged with the mercenary army, and after losing most of his soldiers, Abdul Injai surrendered to Portugal. He was deported to Cape Verde and received regular pensions from the government until he died several years later.
