= Constantino Teixeira =

Prime minister of Guinea-Bissau (1933–1988)

Constantino Teixeira (24 July 1933, Bissau – 1988, Bissau) was a Bissau-Guinean politician who was Prime Minister of Guinea-Bissau from 15 July 1978 to 27 September 1978.
