= 2005 Guinea-Bissau presidential election =

- 19 June 2005 (first round); 24 July 2005 (second round)
- Registered: 538,471
- Turnout: 87.63% (first round); 78.55% (second round)
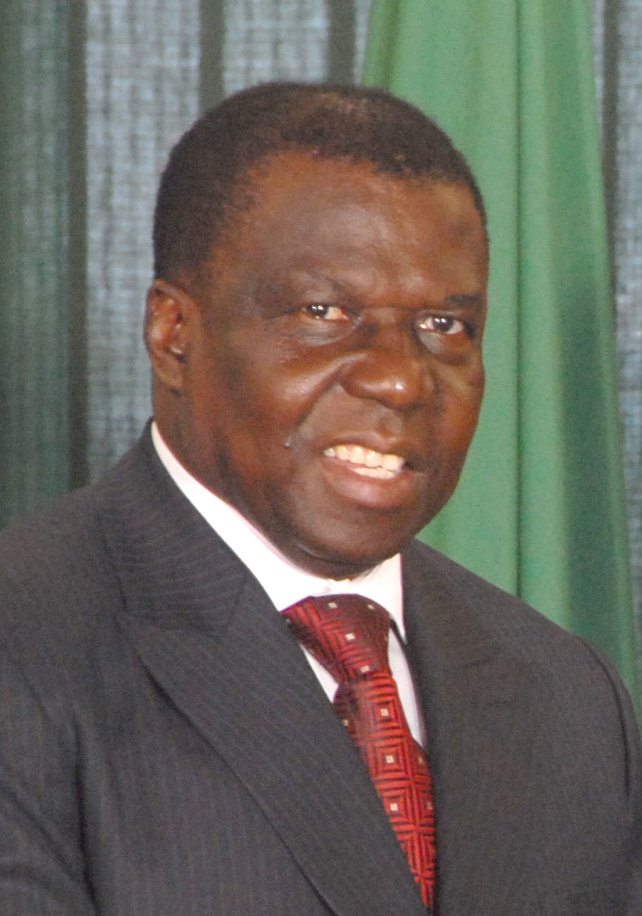

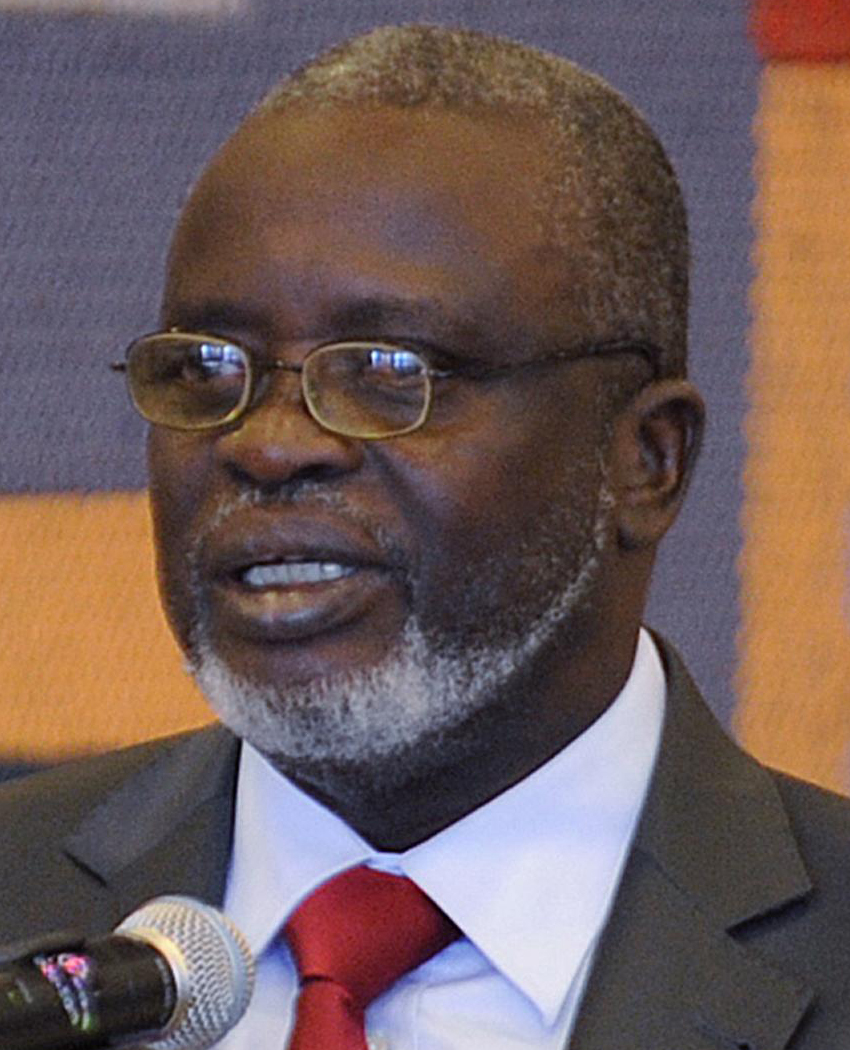
Nominee	João Bernardo Vieira	Malam Bacai Sanhá
Party	Independent	PAIGC
Popular vote	216,167	196,759
Percentage	52.35%	47.65%
President before election
Henrique Rosa (acting)
Independent
Elected President
João Bernardo Vieira
Independent

Presidential elections were held in Guinea-Bissau on 19 June 2005, with a second round runoff on 24 July. The elections marked the end of a transition to democratic rule after the previously elected government was overthrown in a September 2003 military coup led by General Veríssimo Correia Seabra. The result was a victory for former president and independent candidate João Bernardo Vieira.

== Background ==
Following the coup, a civilian government was nominated to oversee the transition and sworn in on 28 September 2003. Henrique Rosa was appointed interim President following talks with military, political, and civil society leaders, while Artur Sanhá of the Party for Social Renewal (PRS) was named Prime Minister.

A legislative election, delayed numerous times during the presidency of Kumba Ialá, took place on 28 March 2004. The poll was declared free and fair by election observers and the former ruling party, the African Party for the Independence of Guinea and Cape Verde (PAIGC), won a plurality of the seats. Ialá's party, the PRS, placed second, followed by the United Social Democratic Party (PUSD). PAIGC leader Carlos Gomes Júnior took office as Prime Minister in May 2004.

The transitional period has been one of increased political and national stability. The caretaker government has managed to improve Guinea-Bissau's human rights record, as evidenced in the most recent U.S. State Department Country Reports on Human Rights Practices entry for Guinea-Bissau (released 28 February 2005, which says "The [Transitional] Government generally respected the human rights of its citizens; however, there were problems in some areas". The previous report (released 25 February 2004) stated "The [Ialá] Government's human rights record remained poor, and it continued to commit serious abuses".

The biggest threat to stability came on 6 October 2004 when a mutiny by soldiers—instigated by unpaid wages—turned violent. General Veríssimo Correia Seabra and his lieutenant were killed by the revolting soldiers. Despite this setback, the tense relations between the government and the military improved with the signing of a memorandum of understanding.

== Candidates ==
On 10 May 2005, the Supreme Court published a list of candidates that will contest the election. Three previously barred candidates were allowed to contest the poll and appeared on the final list of candidates published on 18 May. The 13 candidates are:

- Adelino Mano Queta - Independent
- Antonieta Rosa Gomes - Guinean Civic Forum-Social Democracy (FCG-SD). Contested the 1994 presidential election and won 1.79% of the vote.
- Aregado Mantenque Té - Workers' Party (PT)
- Paulino Empossa Ié - Independent
- Faustino Fadut Imbali - Manifest Party of the People (PMP). Prime Minister from March to December 2001.
- Francisco Fadul - United Social Democratic Party (PUSD). Prime Minister from 3 December 1998 to 19 February 2000.
- Mamadú Iaia Djaló - Independent
- Idrissa Djaló - National Unity Party (PUN)
- João Bernardo "Nino" Vieira - Independent. President from 1980 to 1999. Like Ialá, he was banned from national politics for five years but his candidacy was approved by the supreme court.
- João Tátis Sá - Guinean People's Party (PPG)
- Kumba Ialá - Party for Social Renewal (PRS). He contested the country's first democratic elections in 1994, losing to incumbent João Bernardo Vieira, and won the 1999/2000 election. He served as president from 17 February 2000 until his ouster by the military in September 2003. His nomination is controversial because the transitional government announced a five-year ban on political activities for former leaders following the coup. Despite this, the Supreme Court approved his candidacy.
- Malam Bacai Sanhá - African Independence Party of Guinea and Cape Verde (PAICG). He served as acting president from 14 May 1999 to 17 February 2000. Sanhá ran in the previous presidential elections, held on 28 November 1999 and placed second with 23.37% of the vote to Kumba Ialá's 38.81%. In the run-off held on 16 January 2000, he was soundly defeated by Ialá, who received 72% of the vote.
- Mário Lopes da Rosa - Independent

Diplomats and political analysts say that the participation of the two ex-presidents Vieira and Ialá may exacerbate tensions among ethnic groups and the military that could destabilize the country. Ex-President Vieira has a troubled relationship with the armed forces. Ex-President Ialá, on the other hand, has a very poor reputation among potential donor countries and financial institutions, with the International Monetary Fund and World Bank freezing aid to the country during his presidency. He has a considerable amount of support from the Balanta ethnic group which dominates the military, but has little support from the other groups. There are unconfirmed reports of the establishment of armed groups along ethnic lines in Bissau.

Four candidates who were approved to contest the election withdrew in the weeks leading up to the poll; Abubacar Baldé of the UNDP, Iancuba Indjai of the PST (who subsequently declared his support for Malam Bacai Sanhá), independent candidate Ibraima Sow (who backed Vieira) and Salvador Tchongó of the RGB-MB.

== Campaign ==
On 2 July Ialá announced his support for Vieira's candidacy in the second round runoff. He called Vieira "a symbol of the construction of the Guinean state and of national unity because he proclaimed our independence in the hills of Boe" and said that he could "be relied upon to defend our national independence, to oppose neo-colonialism, to build the republic and promote peace, stability and above all, national reconciliation". Given Ialá's sharp hostility to Vieira in previous years, this endorsement was viewed as surprising by many, and there was reportedly significant dissatisfaction with the decision among Ialá's supporters.

It has been alleged that Vieira's re-election campaign was partly funded by Colombian drug dealers, who use Guinea-Bissau as a transit route to transport drugs to Europe.

== Conduct ==
Voting took place peacefully in the first round on 19 June. Chief EU election monitor Johan Van Heck said his group noted no major irregularities, adding, "We have the impression that throughout the country everyone has had the chance to express themselves without being intimidated." The next day, Van Heck praised the fact that "the military forces abstained from intervening in the process and rather helped the conduct of the election." The EU observer added, "More than 90 percent of the polling stations were fully operational an hour after they had opened, and the secret ballot was guaranteed."

On 22 June, provisional tallies put Sanhá in first place, followed by Vieira and Ialá in third. Members of Ialá's Party for Social Renewal (PRS) deemed the results "false". Two days later, at least two people died when police fired tear gas and live bullets at a crowd of Ialá supporters, who were protesting the released results.

Beginning on 25 June, Senegalese President Abdoulaye Wade held separate meetings with the three main candidates; Wade said that he was mediating at the request of the Economic Community of West African States (ECOWAS) and was not interfering in Guinea-Bissau's affairs. Kumba Ialá, speaking at a press conference in Dakar on 27 June, accepted the results "in the interests of peace and stability", although he still maintained that he had actually received the most votes. According to Ialá, he won 38%, Sanhá won 28%, and Vieira won 26%; he alleged that the votes were manipulated so that his total went to Sanhá and Sanhá's total went to Vieira. Also on 27 June, Vieira promised to "respect the verdict of the ballot boxes", as did Sanhá, who described himself as "a man of peace and stability".

== Results ==
Final results of the first round were released on 25 June. Malam Bacai Sanhá received 35.45% of the vote, João Bernardo "Nino" Vieira won 28.87%, and Kumba Ialá 25.00%. Ten other candidates split the remaining votes. Electoral commission head Malam Mané made "a strong appeal for moderation and public-spiritedness." Voter turnout for the first round was placed at 87.3%.

On July 28, the electoral commission reported that Vieira had garnered 20,000 vote more than Sanhá in run-off voting, however, the results were "provisional" since the PAIGC demanded a recount, citing irregularities in the capital and in the west. After the provisional results were announced, Vieira praised his rival Sanha, called him a democrat and said he hoped he would help unify the country; he also vowed that "from today, Guinea-Bissau will change in the right direction". A spokesman for Sanha alleged fraud, however.

Candidate	Party	First round		Second round	
Candidate	Party	Votes	%	Votes	%
Malam Bacai Sanhá	African Party for the Independence of Guinea and Cape Verde	158,276	35.45	196,759	47.65
João Bernardo Vieira	Independent	128,918	28.87	216,167	52.35
Kumba Ialá	Party for Social Renewal	111,606	25.00		
Francisco Fadul	United Social Democratic Party	12,733	2.85		
Aregado Mantenque Té	Workers' Party	9,000	2.02		
Mamadú Iaia Djaló	Independent	7,112	1.59		
Mário Lopes da Rosa	Independent	4,863	1.09		
Idrissa Djaló	National Unity Party	3,604	0.81		
Adelino Mano Quetá	Independent	2,816	0.63		
Faustino Imbali	Manifest Party of the People	2,330	0.52		
Paulino Empossa Ié	Independent	2,215	0.50		
Antonieta Rosa Gomes	Guinean Civic Forum-Social Democracy	1,642	0.37		
João Tátis Sá	Guinean People's Party	1,378	0.31		
Total		446,493	100.00	412,926	100.00
Valid votes		446,493	94.63	412,926	97.62
Invalid/blank votes		25,350	5.37	10,052	2.38
Total votes		471,843	100.00	422,978	100.00
Registered voters/turnout		538,471	87.63	538,472	78.55
Source: African Elections Database
