= Guinean Civic Forum–Social Democracy =

Political party in Guinea-Bissau

The Guinean Civic Forum–Social Democracy (Portuguese: Fórum Cívico Guineense-Social Democracia) is a political party in Guinea-Bissau.

== History ==
The party was established by Antonieta Rosa Gomes on 23 February 1991 in Brazil. It was legalised on 31 March 1994, and contested the 1994 general elections. Gomes was the only female candidate, receiving 1.8% of the vote and finishing last. In the parliamentary elections the party received just 0.1% of the vote and failed to win a seat in the National People's Assembly.

In the 1999 general elections the party did not run for the Assembly, but put forward Gomes as their presidential candidate. Again the sole female candidate, she finished in last place with 0.8% of the vote. The 2004 parliamentary elections saw the party receive 1% of the vote, but again failed to win a seat. Gomes remained the party's candidate for the 2005 presidential elections and the only women running, but received only 0.4% of the vote.

The party did not contest elections in 2009, 2009 or 2012, but supported the 2012 coup. The party's application to contest the 2014 general elections was rejected by the Supreme Court.
