= Artur Sanhá =

Bissau-Guinean politician (born 1965)

António Artur Sanhá

12th Prime Minister of Guinea-Bissau
- In office 28 September 2003 – 10 May 2004
- President: Henrique Rosa (acting)
- Preceded by: Mário Pires
- Succeeded by: Carlos Gomes Júnior

Personal details
- Born: 1965 (age 59–60)
- Political party: Party for Social Renewal (until 2008)

António Artur Sanhá (born 1965) is a Bissau-Guinean politician. He was the Prime Minister of Guinea-Bissau from 28 September 2003 to 10 May 2004 and also served as Secretary-General of the Party for Social Renewal (PRS).

== Career ==
Following the election of PRS leader Kumba Ialá as President, Sanhá was appointed as Minister of Internal Administration in the government named on 19 February 2000, under Prime Minister Caetano N'Tchama. In March 2001, the PRS wanted Ialá to appoint Sanhá, the Secretary-General of the PRS, as Prime Minister to replace N'Tchama, but Ialá resisted this, considering Sanhá too radical; he appointed Faustino Imbali as Prime Minister instead.

Sanhá was removed from his position as Interior Minister by Ialá in August 2001 following suspicions regarding the death of a woman, Florinda Baptista, with whom Sanhá was said to have been romantically involved, although Ialá did not give a reason for Sanhá's dismissal. Sanhá said that he did not know the woman, but her family said that people close to Sanhá had forced her into having an abortion.

After Ialá was ousted in a military coup on 14 September 2003, the military junta chose Sanhá as Prime Minister of the transitional government, although its choice of Sanhá was opposed by 15 of the 17 involved political parties because Sanhá was not a political independent; concerns also remained about the 2001 incident. Sanhá was nevertheless sworn in as Prime Minister on 28 September in Bissau. His transitional government, which was planned to govern for six months prior to a new parliamentary election, was sworn in on 3 October. Following the parliamentary election, which was held in March 2004, a report accused Sanhá of interfering in the election and thereby causing disorganization to worsen; he defended himself by saying he had gotten involved "only after things began to go wrong". A new government under PAIGC leader Carlos Gomes Júnior took office in May.

In June 2005, during protests by Ialá's supporters alleging fraud in the first round of the presidential election, in which Ialá officially took third place, police fired on the protesters and arrested Sanhá, who was leading the march and was found by police to be carrying a loaded gun.

Sanhá was angered by the failure of the PRS to place his name at the top of the party's candidate list for the November 2008 parliamentary election, and he resigned in October 2008. At a press conference on 21 October, he stated that he could "no longer endure the injustice that prevails within the PRS", arguing that it was "adrift because of some opportunists".
