= Ansumane Mané =

President of Guinea-Bissau (1940–2000)

Brigadier General Ansumane Mané

Chairman of the Supreme Command of the Military Junta
- In office 7 May 1999 – 14 May 1999
- Preceded by: Nino Vieira (as President)
- Succeeded by: Malam Bacai Sanhá (as acting President)

Personal details
- Born: c. 1940 British Gambia
- Died: 30 November 2000 (aged 59–60) Biombo Region, Guinea-Bissau
- Cause of death: Assassination
- Party: None (military)

Military service
- Allegiance: Guinea-Bissau
- Branch/service: Revolutionary Armed Forces of the People
- Rank: Brigadier general

Brigadier General Ansumane Mané (c. 1940 – 30 November 2000) was a Bissau-Guinean military officer who led a 1998 uprising against the government of President João Bernardo Vieira, which caused a brief but bloody civil war.

Mané participated in the independence war against Portugal where he was Vieira's bodyguard. A close ally of Vieira, he backed him in the 1980 coup against Guinea Bissau President Luís Cabral. Mané was head of the armed forces of Guinea Bissau during Vieira's presidency before Vieira sacked him in 1998, accusing him of smuggling arms to Casamance separatist rebels in Senegal. Mané subsequently mobilized the troops formerly under his command and led a rebellion against Vieira.

== Early life ==
Mané was of the Mandinga ethnicity.

== Military background ==
Mané fought in the war of independence from Portugal alongside Vieira. Mané was Vieira's bodyguard. He backed Nino Vieira when they later seized power in a 1980 coup against Luís Cabral.

In early 1998, he was suspended as Chief of Staff of the armed forces for allegedly smuggling arms to Casamance separatist rebels in Senegal. In a letter published in early April 1998, he in turn made the same accusation against the Minister of Defense, Samba Lamine Mané, and other officers; he also alleged that Vieira had permitted the arms smuggling and claimed that he was suspended as Chief of Staff in connection with "shady plan to mount a coup d'état". According to Birgit Embaló, soldiers and war veterans in Guinea Bissau were upset at their pay, leading the military to self-finance itself through smuggling.

Mané was subsequently dismissed by Vieira and replaced by General Humberto Gomes on 6 June 1998. He led a military rebellion against Vieira on the following day, resulting in the civil war. A peace agreement in November 1998 provided for a transitional national unity government and new elections.

After Vieira was deposed on 7 May 1999 in a renewed outbreak of fighting, Mané became temporary head of state (official title: Chairman of the Supreme Command of the Military Junta) until 14 May when Malam Bacai Sanhá, the president of the National People's Assembly, was installed as acting president.

== Political growth ==
The military junta headed by Mané remained in place during the transitional period leading to new elections; Mané cast himself as a guardian of democracy. A parliamentary election, along with the first round of a presidential election, was held on 28 November 1999. Two weeks prior to this, Mané's junta proposed an arrangement giving it power over the government for ten years, which would enable it to dissolve the government in case of a severe political crisis; however, political parties objected to this and the proposal was dropped. Although the junta backed the presidential candidacy of Malam Bacai Sanhá of the African Party for the Independence of Guinea and Cape Verde (PAIGC) in the second round of the election, held in January 2000, Kumba Ialá of the Party for Social Renewal (PRS) was victorious. Prior to the election, Ialá had already said that it would not be acceptable for the junta to remain in any capacity.

== Downfall and death ==
Although the junta was dissolved following Ialá's victory, Mané remained powerful, acting as an obstacle to Ialá's authority. At one point he refused to allow Ialá to go to Senegal on a state visit; he also accompanied Ialá on a visit to Nigeria. In November 2000, Ialá promoted a number of senior military officers; Mané objected to the promotions and declared himself head of the armed forces. He revoked Ialá's promotions, placed military chief of staff Veríssimo Correia Seabra and deputy chief of staff Emílio Costa under house arrest, and appointed General Buota Nan Batcha as the new chief of staff. When issuing a communique claiming that the situation was calm, he signed it as the head of the junta, which had previously been dissolved when Ialá was elected president. Fighting broke out on 23 November between forces loyal to Mané and those loyal to Seabra. The government subsequently said that Mané fled to Quinhamel in Biombo Region, in the west of the country.

General Mané was assassinated by forces loyal to the then president Kumba Ialá and General Batista Tagme Na Waie in Biombo Region a week later, on 30 November 2000, along with two others. General Mané did not put up a fight against the Balanta tribe troops. Although state television broadcast images of three bodies, these were deemed unrecognizable by the international media. The opposition PAIGC said that Mané was correct to oppose the promotions.

Among Mané's most prominent allies was Naval Chief of Staff Mohamed Lamine Sanha who was also assassinated a few years later.
