= Henrique Rosa =

President of Guinea-Bissau (1946–2013)

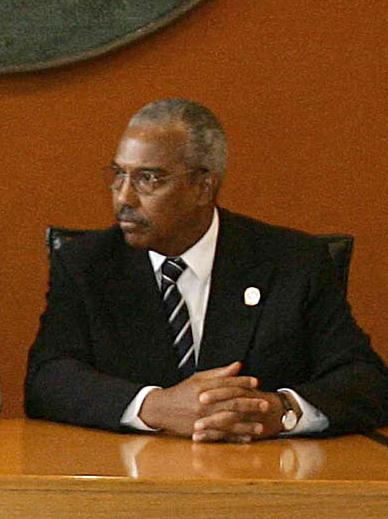
- Rosa in 2005

President of Guinea-Bissau Acting
- In office 28 September 2003 – 1 October 2005
- Prime Minister: Artur Sanhá; Carlos Gomes
- Preceded by: Veríssimo Correia Seabra (as Chairman of the Military Committee for the Restoration of Constitutional and Democratic Order)
- Succeeded by: João Bernardo Vieira

Personal details
- Born: 18 January 1946 Bafatá, Guinea-Bissau
- Died: 15 May 2013 (aged 67) Porto, Portugal
- Party: Independent

Henrique Pereira Rosa (18 January 1946 – 15 May 2013) was a Bissau-Guinean politician who served as interim President of Guinea-Bissau from 2003 to 2005. He was born in 1946 in Bafatá.

== Interim President of Guinea-Bissau ==
Rosa served as the interim President of Guinea-Bissau from 28 September 2003 until 1 October 2005. His appointment came following a military coup that deposed the elected government of President Kumba Ialá on 14 September, and subsequent talks between political officials, civil society leaders, and the Military Committee for the Restitution of Constitutional and Democratic Order, led by Veríssimo Correia Seabra.

The main goal of the Rosa-led caretaker government was to administer elections that would return the country to constitutional, democratic rule. This was achieved in March 2004 with the holding of a free and fair legislative election. A presidential election held in June and July 2005 was also considered democratic and transparent. The latter election was won by João Bernardo "Nino" Vieira, who had previously been President from 1980 to 1999; Rosa was not a candidate.

Additionally, during the two-year interim presidency, Rosa's government managed to bring a level of political stability to Guinea-Bissau along with notable improvements to the country's human rights record.

== Resignation and subsequent political activity ==
Rosa handed over power to Vieira on 1 October 2005.

Rosa stood as an independent candidate in the June 2009 presidential election, finishing in third place.

== Death ==
On 15 May 2013, Rosa died at a hospital in Porto, in northern Portugal, nine-months after being diagnosed with lung cancer. He was 67 years old.

Political offices
Preceded by Veríssimo Correia Seabra as Chairman of the Military Committee for the Restoration of Constitutional and Democratic Order of Guinea-Bissau	President of Guinea-Bissau; Acting; 2003–2005	Succeeded by João Bernardo Vieira
