= Faustino Imbali =

Prime Minister of Guinea-Bissau in 2001 and 2019

Prime Minister of Guinea-Bissau
- In office 31 October 2019 – 8 November 2019
- President: José Mário Vaz
- Preceded by: Aristides Gomes
- Succeeded by: Aristides Gomes
- In office 21 March 2001 – 9 December 2001
- President: Kumba Yala
- Preceded by: Caetano N'Tchama
- Succeeded by: Alamara Nhassé

Personal details
- Born: Faustino Fudut Imbali; 1 May 1956 (age 70) Ilondé, Portuguese Guinea
- Party: Independent (while in office); Manifest Party of the People

Faustino Fudut Imbali (born 1 May 1956) is a Bissau-Guinean politician who was Prime Minister of Guinea-Bissau from 21 March 2001 to 9 December 2001, and again from 29 October 2019 to 8 November 2019. He was the Minister of Foreign Affairs from 2012 to 2013.

== Biography ==
Imbali was born in Ilondé, Portuguese Guinea in May 1956. He studied at the University of Bordeaux in France, graduating with a master's degree in political sociology and development in 1988. He subsequently worked as a researcher at the Instituto Nacional de Estudos e Pesquisa in Bissau. During the Guinea-Bissau Civil War of 1998–1999 he was an advisor to Prime Minister Francisco Fadul.

Imbali ran as an independent candidate in the November 1999 presidential elections and placed third, winning 8.22% of the vote. After the victory of Kumba Ialá of the Party for Social Renewal (PRS) in that election, Imbali was appointed Deputy Prime Minister in charge of Economic and Social Reconstruction in the government named on 19 February 2000, under Prime Minister Caetano N'Tchama. Subsequently, in the government named on 25 January 2001, he became Minister of Foreign Affairs. When N'Tchama was dismissed by Ialá in March 2001, Ialá nominated Imbali as his successor, despite the objections of the opposition, which held a majority in parliament. The opposition filed a no-confidence motion against Imbali but subsequently conditionally dropped the motion. In December, Imbali was dismissed by Ialá, who criticized him strongly. Accusing Imbali of diverting money from the armed forces (which Imbali denied), Ialá warned Imbali in April 2002 that he would go to jail unless he returned the money.

In 2003, Imbali founded the Manifest Party of the People (PMP) and ran as its presidential candidate in the 19 June 2005 presidential election, winning 0.52% of the vote.

Imbali was reportedly beaten and taken into custody by security forces on 5 June 2009 in violence directed against alleged coup plotters, including Baciro Dabo and Helder Proenca.
