= Carlos Gomes Júnior =

Bissau-Guinean politician (born 1949)

Carlos Gomes
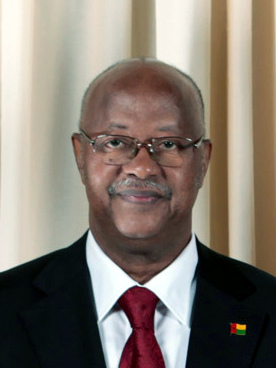
- Gomes in 2009

13th Prime Minister of Guinea-Bissau
- In office 2 January 2009 – 10 February 2012
- President: João Bernardo Vieira; Raimundo Pereira (Acting); Malam Bacai Sanhá; Raimundo Pereira (Acting)
- Preceded by: Carlos Correia
- Succeeded by: Adiato Djaló Nandigna (Acting)
- In office 10 May 2004 – 2 November 2005
- President: Henrique Rosa (Acting); João Bernardo Vieira
- Preceded by: Artur Sanhá
- Succeeded by: Aristides Gomes

Personal details
- Born: 19 December 1949 (age 76) Bolama, Portuguese Guinea (now Guinea-Bissau)
- Party: African Party for the Independence of Guinea and Cape Verde
- Spouse: Salomea Neves
- Education: Laval University

Carlos Domingos Gomes Júnior (born December 19, 1949) is a Bissau-Guinean politician who was Prime Minister of Guinea-Bissau from 10 May 2004 to 2 November 2005, and again from 25 December 2008 to 10 February 2012. He has been the President of the African Party for the Independence of Guinea and Cape Verde (PAIGC) since 2002 and is widely known as "Cadogo". He resigned as prime minister on 10 February 2012 to run in the presidential election triggered by President Malam Bacai Sanhá's death on 9 January.

== Background ==
Gomes was born in Bolama. He was a delegate to PAIGC's Fifth Congress in December 1991, and in the first multiparty elections, held in 1994, he was elected to the National People's Assembly of Guinea-Bissau from the 26th Electoral District. In 1996, he was elected First Vice-President of the National People's Assembly, Second Secretary of the Interparliamentary Committee of the West African Economic and Monetary Union, and Vice-President of the Interparliamentary Committee of the West African Economic and Monetary Union. In the National People's Assembly, he also served as Chairman of the Committee for Economic Affairs and President of the Administrative Council. At PAIGC's Sixth Congress in May 1998, Gomes was elected to the party's Political Bureau, and at the party's Third Extraordinary Congress in September 1999 he was re-elected to the Political Bureau and also became the party's Secretary for Foreign Relations and International Cooperation.

Gomes was elected as President of PAIGC at the Fourth Extraordinary Congress in January–February 2002. He is a banker and businessman, reputed to be the richest man in Guinea-Bissau. PAIGC won the most seats in the March 2004 parliamentary election, and Gomes became prime minister in May.

== Political life ==
Prior to the victory of former president Vieira in the mid-2005 presidential election, Gomes said that he would resign if Vieira was elected, referring to the latter as a "bandit and mercenary who betrayed his own people". After Vieira's election, Gomes initially refused to recognize the result, but he also moved away from his earlier threat to resign. Vieira took office on 1 October 2005, and almost two weeks later he and Gomes had a meeting, with Gomes anticipating that the two would be able to work together. However, on 28 October Vieira announced the dissolution of Gomes's government, and a long-time ally of Vieira, Aristides Gomes, was appointed prime minister on 2 November 2005.

Following the assassination of former navy commander Mohamed Lamine Sanha in early January 2007, Gomes accused Vieira of involvement in the killing in an interview with Lusa on January 8. A warrant was issued for Gomes's arrest on January 10, and when police tried to arrest him later that day he fled and took refuge in the United Nations building in Bissau. A spokesman for Gomes said that it would be unconstitutional to arrest him because he enjoyed immunity as a member of the National People's Assembly. A presidential spokesman accused Gomes of trying to destabilize the country. Gomes left the UN building on January 29, after the arrest warrant was dropped.

According to Gomes, he was misquoted in the interview that led to the arrest warrant. An investigating judge said that Gomes had not provided any proof for his claim of Vieira's involvement, and on December 20, 2007, it was announced that Gomes had been charged with false testimony and slandering the head of state.

Gomes sought re-election as President of PAIGC at the party's Seventh Ordinary Congress in June–July 2008. Malam Bacai Sanhá, the party's presidential candidate in 2000 and 2005, challenged Gomes for the party leadership, but Gomes was re-elected at the end of the congress on July 1–2, receiving 578 votes against 355 for Sanhá.

=== 2008 election ===
In the November 2008 legislative election, PAIGC won a majority of 67 out of 100 seats in the National People's Assembly. Gomes himself was elected to a seat as a PAIGC candidate in the 24th constituency, located in Bissau. Following the election, Vieira appointed Gomes as prime minister on December 25, 2008. Gomes said on this occasion that his government would focus on "good governance and a reform of the justice system" and that he and Vieira would "put aside any personal differences" in order to work towards solving the country's problems. He was sworn in on January 2, 2009.

=== 2010 military unrest ===
Following the failure of a coup plot in 2008, Rear Admiral Bubo Na Tchuto escaped to Gambia where he was arrested. Subsequently, he clandestinely returned to Guinea-Bissau where he took refuge at a UN compound. The UN agreed to turn him over to the government. Nevertheless, he continued to stay in the compound. On April 1, 2010, soldiers went to the UN office. Bubo Na Tchuto voluntarily left with them. On The same day, soldiers invaded Prime Minister Gomes’ residence and held him there.

Simultaneously, forty military officers, including the head of Guinea-Bissau's armed forces, were held at an army base.

Hundreds of the PM's supporters demanded his release. In response the deputy army chief, Antonio Ndjai, said: "If the people continue to go out into the streets to show their support for Carlos Gomes Junior, then I will kill Carlos Gomes Junior ... or I will send someone to kill him."

=== 2012 election and coup ===
He resigned as prime minister on 10 February 2012 in order to run in the presidential election. He won the first round and was due to face a runoff against Mohamed Ialá Embaló. Prior to the a second round, a coup against the civilian government resulted in a military takeover of the capital, Bissau, amid reports that he was killed. However, Gomes and President Raimundo Pereira were arrested by the military as gunfire ensued in the capital of Bissau. The Chairperson of the African Union Jean Ping issued a statement rejecting the coup and demanded the release of Pereira and Gomes. The United Nations Security Council issued a statement saying that they "strongly condemn the forcible seizure of power".

On 27 April, the deposed leaders were freed and sent to the Ivory Coast.

Political offices
| Preceded by Artur Sanhá | Prime Minister of Guinea-Bissau; 2004–2005 | Succeeded by Aristides Gomes |
| Preceded by Carlos Correia | Prime Minister of Guinea-Bissau; 2009–2012 | Succeeded by Adiato Djaló Nandigna; Acting |
