= Caetano N'Tchama =

Bissau-Guinean politician (1955–2007)

Caetano N'Tchama (23 January 1955 – 15 December 2007) was a Bissau-Guinean politician and former Prime Minister. He held that position from 19 February 2000 to 19 March 2001 and was a member of the Social Renewal Party (PRS).

== Early life ==
N'Tchama served as Minister of the Interior under Prime Minister Francisco Fadul from 1999 to 2000; in Fadul's national unity government, which was sworn in on February 20, 1999, N'Tchama was one of the members chosen by Ansumane Mané's military junta. Following the election of PRS leader Kumba Ialá as president, N'Tchama, who was the third ranking leader of the PRS and a cousin of Ialá, was chosen by the PRS as Prime Minister in a party vote on 24 January 2000, with 46 votes in favor and six opposed. In late September and early October 2000, he was in Dakar and then Paris for medical treatment. After Fadul accused N'Tchama of corruption, N'Tchama said in October 2000 that he planned to take legal action against Fadul due to these accusations.

In March 2001, the PRS held discussions on replacing N'Tchama as prime minister. Ialá dismissed N'Tchama on March 19, saying that this move was necessary to increase stability and decrease political tension. N'Tchama subsequently became head of the Internal Audit Board before being appointed as Attorney General on September 6, 2001.

He died on December 15, 2007, after a prolonged illness.
