= National Lyceum Kwame N'Krumah =

Location
- Titina Silá Square, Bissau-Velho; Bissau; Guinea-Bissau
- Coordinates: 11.8621°N 15.5883°W

Information
- Established: 22 April 1950; 75 years ago
- Director: João Imbalá

The National Lyceum Kwame N'Krumah (Portuguese: Liceu Nacional Kwame N'Krumah, LNKN) is a Bissau-Guinean educational institution, based in Bissau, the country's capital.

It is the oldest public secondary education institution and one of the most respected in Guinea-Bissau.

== History ==
The National Lyceum Kwame N'Krumah descends from the first public high school institution in Portuguese Guinea, at a time when young people from the colony had to head to the metropolis in order to continue their studies.

=== Foundation ===
Through ordinance No. 13130, of April 22, 1950, the Bissau High School-Lyceum (Colégio-Liceu de Bissau) was created, which provided secondary education to the youth of that time until the 5th year of high school, corresponding to the current 9th year of schooling in the educational system of Guinea-Bissau. The Lyceum was coordinated by a group of Portuguese intellectuals.

However, it was only in March 1958 that the Bissau High School-Lyceum was assimilated to the legal regime of Portuguese high schools, having received the name of Honório Barreto Lyceum (Liceu Honório Barreto). The following year, in 1959, the Lyceum received its own building, an architectural project by Eurico Pinto Lopes.

=== Post-independence ===
In 1975, in the second year of national independence, it was renamed to its current name, National Lyceum Kwame N'Krumah (Liceu Nacional Kwame N'Krumah). Honors Kwame N'Krumah, the first President of Ghana, one of the mentors of pan-Africanist ideas.

In the academic year 1984–1985, the LNKN, which had a colossal structure, underwent a profound administrative reform, being divided into four high schools: National Lyceum Kwame N'Krumah (main heir to the historical high school), Regional Lyceum 1 (current Agostinho Neto Lyceum), Regional Lyceum 2 (current Samora Moisés Machel Lyceum) and the 23 de Janeiro School Unit.

In 2017, the Chinese Embassy in Bissau announced that it would finance a renovation project for the Honório Barreto Building, headquarters building of the National Lyceum Kwame N'Krumah, with a special emphasis on improving the natural science laboratories.
