= Batista Tagme Na Waie =

Bissau-Guinean military officer (1949-2009)

General Batista Tagme Na Waie
- Born: Batista Tagme Na Waie; 1949; Catió, Portuguese Guinea
- Died: March 1, 2009 (aged 59–60); Bissau, Guinea-Bissau
- Military career
- Allegiance: Guinea-Bissau
- Branch: Revolutionary Armed Forces of the People
- Service years: 1962–2009
- Rank: General
- Conflicts: Guinea-Bissau War of Independence; Guinea-Bissau Civil War

General Batista Tagme Na Waie (1949 – 1 March 2009) was a Bissau-Guinean military officer who served as the chief of general staff of the Revolutionary Armed Forces of the People until his assassination in 2009.

== Military career ==
Na Waie was a participant in the junta that overthrew João Bernardo Vieira in the 1990s and a veteran of the Guinea-Bissau War of Independence,

Na Waie was a member of the Balanta ethnic group. He had been appointed chief of staff as a result of the October 2004 murder of his predecessor, Verissimo Correia Seabra; IRIN has described him as a "consensus figure put forward by the military establishment which the government felt forced to accept". After Tagme Na Wai became Chief of Staff of the Armed Forces, he announced the reintegration of 65 senior officers into the military, including Sanha, on 1 December 2004; Na Wai appointed Sanha as his naval advisor.

== Political tension ==
A "bitter rival" of Vieira, both before the junta (having survived Vieira's purges of the Guinea-Bissau military in the 1980s) and after Vieira's return to power, Na Waie reported surviving an assassination attempt in January 2009, when a militia assigned to the presidential palace opened fire on his staff car; the militia denied that this had been an assassination attempt.

== Death ==
On 1 March 2009, Na Waie was killed by an explosion in the headquarters of the Guinea-Bissau military. While witnesses reported seeing a rocket-propelled grenade, aides to Na Waie reported that a bomb was detonated under a staircase as Na Waie was heading to his office.

=== Aftermath ===
In the early hours of the next day, Vieira was killed, apparently by troops loyal to Na Waie; a military representative subsequently denied allegations that Vieira's death had been a retaliation. Army spokesman Zamora Induta did, however, say that Vieira had been involved in Na Waie's assassination.

An army officer said on 5 March that Na Waie had found a stash of cocaine weighing 200 kilograms at an army hangar about a week before he was killed. His funeral was held at the Military Club in Bissau on 8 March. On 26 March, it was reported that three senior officers — Colonel Arsene Balde, Colonel Abdoulaye Ba, and Brigadier General Melcias Fernandes — had been arrested in the preceding days for involvement in Na Waie's death.
