= Veríssimo Correia Seabra =

Bissau-Guinean general

General Veríssimo Correia Seabra

Chairman of the Military Committee for the Restoration of Constitutional and Democratic Order
- In office 14 September 2003 – 28 September 2003
- Preceded by: Kumba Ialá (as President)
- Succeeded by: Henrique Rosa (as acting President)

Personal details
- Born: 16 February 1947 Bissau, Portuguese Guinea
- Died: 6 October 2004 (aged 57) Bissau, Guinea-Bissau
- Cause of death: Mutiny
- Party: PAIGC
- Children: Luis Artur Correia Seabra

Military service
- Allegiance: Guinea-Bissau
- Branch/service: Revolutionary Armed Forces of the People
- Years of service: 1963–2004
- Rank: General
- Battles/wars: Guinea-Bissau War of Independence

General Veríssimo Correia Seabra (16 February 1947 – 6 October 2004) was a Bissau-Guinean general, known for leading a coup that deposed Kumba Ialá on September 14, 2003.

== Early life ==
Correia Seabra was born in the capital city, Bissau, on February 16, 1947. He belonged to the Papel minority.

In 1963, at the age of 16, Correia Seabra joined the African Party for the Independence of Guinea and Cape Verde (PAIGC) as a guerilla fighting against Portuguese colonial rule. Three years later, he was sent to study electronic engineering in Bulgaria. In 1971, he attended an artillery school in the Soviet Union. On his return to the Guinea-Bissau War of Independence, he was in charge of an artillery unit near the southern border with Guinea. In 1976, he was sent to Portugal for officer training.

== Career ==
In the years following independence, Correia Seabra played a key role in the internal politics of the PAIGC. He participated in the 1980 military coup that overthrew President Luís Cabral. Promoted steadily through the ranks, he became deputy head of the Guinea-Bissau military contingent of the United Nations mission in Angola from 1991 to 1992. He was then appointed head of operations in the military high command two years later.

=== Conflict ===
Correia Seabra joined General Ansumane Mané in the 1998 uprising against President João Bernardo Vieira. The nation descended into a brief, but bloody civil war. He was again involved in a May 1999 military coup that forced President Vieira from power. Soon thereafter, he became chief of staff of the armed forces and was appointed Minister of Defense in the government named on February 19, 2000, under President Kumba Ialá. In November 2000, Mané attempted to replace Correia Seabra as chief of staff and placed him under house arrest, but Correia Seabra escaped and fighting erupted; Mané was killed in a clash with government forces a week later. Correia Seabra remained in his position.

== Soldier payment controversy ==
As Ialá’s behavior became more erratic and the government failed to pay several months of wages owed to soldiers, Seabra warned the President that the military would be forced to intervene again unless salaries were paid. Correia Seabra led the bloodless coup that ousted Kumba Ialá from power on September 14, 2003. It was welcomed by most Guineans while provoking condemnation from the international community. His first act as head of the 32-member Military Committee for the Restoration of Constitutional and Democratic Order was to convene a meeting of political, religious, and civil society leaders to choose a new civilian-led government that would be charged with organizing elections.

Henrique Rosa was nominated to head the caretaker government and became president on September 28, 2003. Seabra continued to serve as chairman of the National Transition Council. Free and fair parliamentary elections were held on March 28, 2004.

=== Death ===
On October 6, 2004, a mutiny by soldiers over unpaid salaries turned violent. Veríssimo Correia Seabra along with an aide, Lieutenant Colonel Domingos Barros, were detained and beaten to death by revolting soldiers.

The Portuguese president, Jorge Sampaio, also called for the restoration of legality in Guinea-Bissau, after learning of the death of Veríssimo Seabra.
