= Malam Bacai Sanhá =

President of Guinea-Bissau from 2009 to 2012

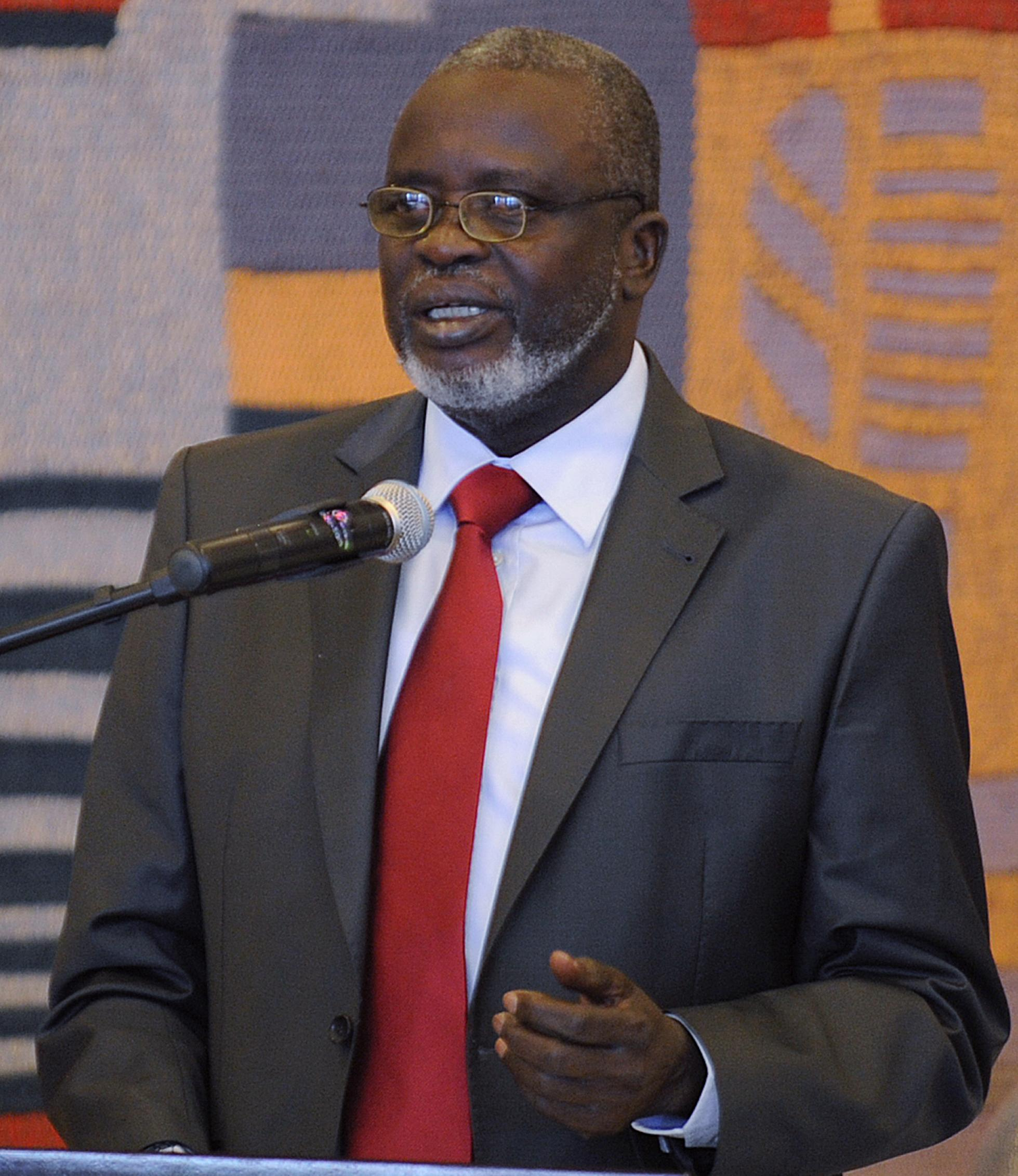
- Sanhá in 2010

4th President of Guinea-Bissau
- In office 8 September 2009 – 9 January 2012
- Prime Minister: Carlos Gomes
- Preceded by: Raimundo Pereira (Interim)
- Succeeded by: Raimundo Pereira (Interim)
- In office 14 May 1999 – 17 February 2000; Acting
- Prime Minister: Francisco Fadul
- Preceded by: Ansumane Mané (as Chairman of the Supreme Command of Military Junta)
- Succeeded by: Kumba Ialá

Personal details
- Born: 5 May 1947 Dar Salam, Portuguese Guinea (now Guinea-Bissau)
- Died: 9 January 2012 (aged 64) Paris, France
- Resting place: Fortaleza de São José da Amura
- Party: PAIGC
- Spouse: Mariama Mane Sanha (1975–2012)

Malam Bacai Sanhá (Portuguese pronunciation: [ˈmalɐ̃ bɐˈkaj sɐˈɲa]) (5 May 1947 – 9 January 2012) was a Bissau-Guinean politician who was President of Guinea-Bissau from 8 September 2009 until his death on 9 January 2012. A member of the African Party for the Independence of Guinea and Cape Verde (PAIGC), Sanhá was President of the National People's Assembly from 1994 to 1999 and then served as acting President of Guinea-Bissau from 14 May 1999, to 17 February 2000, following the ouster of President João Bernardo Vieira. Standing as the PAIGC candidate, he placed second in the 1999–2000 presidential election as well as the 2005 presidential election before winning the June–July 2009 presidential election.

== Personal life ==
Sanhá was born on 5 May 1947 in the Quinara region to a Muslim family. He was married to Mariama Mane Sanha until his death in 2012.

== Early political career ==
A long-time member of PAIGC, Sanhá served as governor of the Gabú and Biombo regions and held several cabinet ministries before becoming President of the National People's Assembly in 1994. A Civil War broke out in June 1998 between elements of the army loyal to General Ansumane Mane and those loyal to President João Bernardo Vieira; on 26 November 1998, Sanhá addressed the first session of the National People's Assembly since the beginning of the war. Even though he was critical of both the rebels and Vieira, he focused more of his criticism on Vieira. Following the ouster of Vieira on 7 May 1999, Sanhá was appointed as acting president by the military junta led by Mane on 11 May. His appointment to succeed Vieira was intended to be in accordance with the constitution, and he was to serve until a new election could be held later in the year. Sanhá was sworn in on 14 May with the promise of peace and an end to political persecution.

== Presidential campaign ==
In the first round of the subsequent presidential election, held on 28 November 1999, Sanhá finished second with 23.37% of the vote. In the run-off, held on 16 January 2000, he won only 28.0% of the vote against Kumba Ialá's 72.0%. The military junta led by Mane supported his candidacy.

Following a 2003 military coup that ousted Ialá and a period of transitional rule, a new presidential election was held on 19 June 2005, in which the three former presidents (Sanhá, Vieira and Ialá) were the main candidates. Sanhá, running again as the PAIGC candidate, finished first with 35.45% of the vote. Former head of state João Bernardo Vieira finished second with 28.87% of the vote. Despite the lead in the first round, Sanhá lost to Vieira in the run-off that took place on 24 July 2005, 47.65% to 52.35%. However, he refused to accept the result, vowing to take the matter to the Supreme Court.

Sanhá challenged PAIGC President Carlos Gomes Junior for the party leadership at PAIGC's Seventh Ordinary Congress in June–July 2008. Gomes was, however, re-elected at the end of the congress on 1–2 July, receiving 578 votes against 355 for Sanhá.

== Presidency ==
In the 2009 presidential election, Sanhá placed first in the first round of voting, then defeated Kumba Ialá in the second round. He was sworn in as president on 8 September. On that occasion he promised to investigate the March 2009 killings of Army Chief of Staff Batista Tagme Na Waie and President Vieira, and he also vowed to fight crime, drug trafficking, and corruption.

== Illness and death ==
Sanhá was a diabetic. In early December 2009, he was due to visit Portugal, but he delayed the visit due to health problems. After fainting, he was taken to Dakar, Senegal and then Paris, France for medical treatment where he said that he was a diabetic and that he had suffered a drop in hemoglobin; even though he insisted that his diabetes was "not as serious as people want to make out;" he added that he intended to be more attentive about his health. Sanhá spent ten days in Paris and subsequently stayed in the Canary Islands for a time before returning to Bissau on 30 December 2009. His chief of protocol stated that he had recovered and was in good condition. Since that time he spent regular intervals in hospitals in Dakar and Paris. During his stay in Paris, a coup as a result of infighting within the armed forces was put down less than two weeks before his death.

Sanhá died on the morning of 9 January 2012, in Paris, aged 64. His office issued a statement that read:

The presidency informs Guinea-Bissau and the international community, with pain and dismay, of the death of his excellency Malam Bacai Sanhá this morning at the Val de Grace in Paris where he was undergoing treatment.

The government issued a decree that it would observe seven days national mourning during which the flag will be flown at half-mast and all concerts and festivities would not occur. It also sought to repatriate Sanhá's body for burial.

Under the constitution, an election was scheduled to be held within 90 days. In the interim the President of the National People's Assembly Raimundo Pereira, from the same party, was sworn in as the acting president.

== Honours ==
- Portugal:
  - Grand Collar of the Order of Prince Henry (GColIH)

Political offices
Preceded by Ansumane Mané	President of Guinea-Bissau; Acting; 1999–2000	Succeeded by Kumba Ialá
Preceded by Raimundo Pereira; Acting	President of Guinea-Bissau; 2009–2012	Succeeded by Raimundo Pereira; Interim
