= Mário Pires =

Bissau-Guinean politician (born 1949)

Mário Pires (1949 - August 8, 2023) was a Bissau-Guinean politician who was Prime Minister from 2002 to 2003. He is a member of the Social Renewal Party (PRS).

== Early life ==
Pires took office as Prime Minister on 17 November 2002, when he was appointed by President Kumba Ialá after the latter dissolved the National People's Assembly and called an early parliamentary election. That election, which was initially planned to be held within 90 days, was subsequently delayed from February 2003 to April, then to July and then to 12 October 2003. After the electoral commission announced in September that it could not finish voter registration in time to meet the planned October date, the military seized power in a coup on 14 September 2003, removing Ialá and Pires from office. Prior to the coup, Pires had warned that a new civil war would occur if the opposition won the election.

Pires was later nominated as head of the Electricity and Water Company of Guinea-Bissau (EAGB). He died on August 8, 2023, at 74.
