= Kumba Yala =

President of Guinea-Bissau from 2000 to 2003

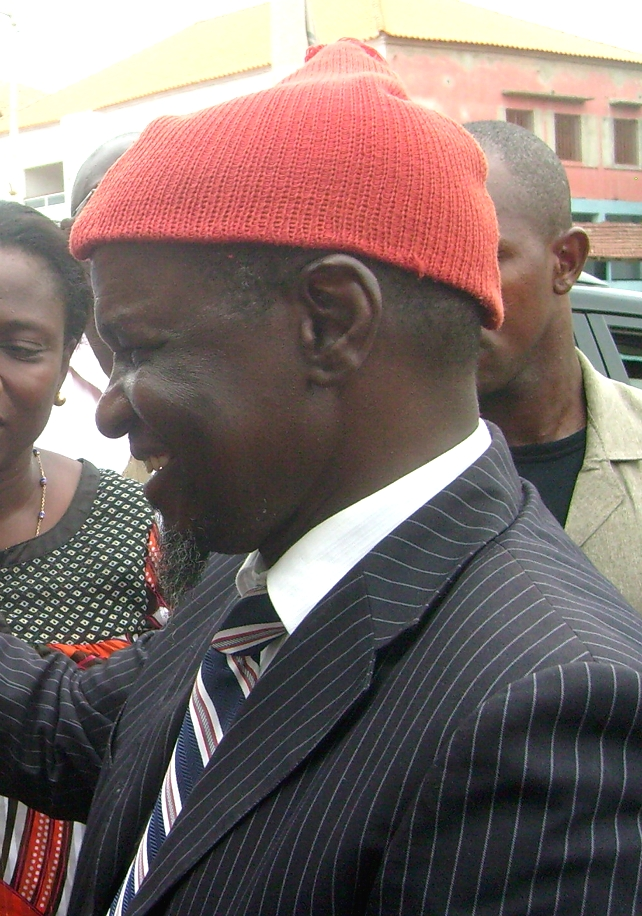
- Yala in 2009

3rd President of Guinea-Bissau
- In office 17 February 2000 – 14 September 2003
- Prime Minister: Caetano N'Tchama; Faustino Imbali; Alamara Nhassé; Mário Pires
- Preceded by: Malam Bacai Sanhá (Acting)
- Succeeded by: Veríssimo Correia Seabra (as Chairman of the Military Committee for the Restoration of Constitutional and Democratic Order)

Personal details
- Born: 15 March 1953 Bula, Portuguese Guinea
- Died: 4 April 2014 (aged 61) Bissau, Guinea-Bissau
- Cause of death: Cardiac arrest
- Resting place: Fortaleza de São José da Amura
- Party: African Party for the Independence of Guinea and Cape Verde (Before 1992); Party for Social Renewal (1992–2014)
- Spouse: Elisabete Yala
- Education: Catholic University of Portugal, Lisbon

Kumba Yalá Embaló, also spelled Ialá (Note: Also Koumba and Mbalu.) (15 March 1953 – 4 April 2014), was a Bissau-Guinean politician who was president from 17 February 2000 until he was deposed in a bloodless military coup on 14 September 2003. He belonged to the Balanta ethnic group and was President of the Social Renewal Party (PRS). In 2008 he converted to Islam and took the name Mohamed Yalá Embaló. He was the founder of the Party for Social Renewal.

== Early life ==
Born to a farming family in Bula, Cacheu Region on 15 March 1953, Yala became a militant member of the African Party for the Independence of Guinea and Cape Verde (PAIGC) during his teenage years. The PAIGC sought independence from Portuguese colonial rule.

He studied theology at the Catholic University of Portugal, in Lisbon, and then philosophy (not completed). In Bissau, Yala studied law at the Law School of the University Amílcar Cabral. After completing his studies, he was appointed director of the National Lyceum Kwame N'Krumah, where he also taught Philosophy and Psychology.

He spoke Portuguese, Crioulo, Spanish, French and English and could read Latin, Greek and Hebrew.

== Political career ==
Yala was the head of a PAIGC delegation to Moscow in honor of the 70th anniversary of the 1917 Bolshevik Revolution, but in 1989 he was expelled from the party for demanding greater democratic reform.

In March 1991, alongside Rafael Barbosa, Yala helped found the Democratic Social Front (FDS). On 14 January 1992, Yala left the FDS and formed the Social Renewal Party (PRS).

The first multiparty presidential election took place on 3 July 1994. Incumbent president and PAIGC candidate João Bernardo "Nino" Vieira won 46.20% of the vote. Yala finished second, capturing 21.88% of the vote. Since no candidate won the required 50% of the vote for an outright victory, a run-off was conducted on 7 August. The opposition parties united behind Yala, but Vieira nevertheless won by a 4% margin (52.02% to 47.98%). Although the election was declared generally free and fair by election observers, Yala contested the results, claiming intimidation of his supporters. The Supreme Court rejected his claims and the results were validated. On 20 August, he accepted the results, but announced that the PRS would not participate in the new government.

On 28 November 1999, after a devastating civil war and the ousting of Vieira, a new presidential election was held. In the first round, Kumba Yala placed first with 38.81% of the vote, followed by interim president and PAIGC candidate, Malam Bacai Sanhá, who won 23.37%. Yala was briefly hospitalized on 29 December 1999 due to high blood pressure, shortly before campaigning for the second round was to begin. He went to Lisbon for medical treatment on 30 December, and after returning to Guinea-Bissau in early January 2000, he launched his second round campaign on 9 January; he said that he was in good health and challenged Sanhá to a debate. The second round, held on 16 January 2000, was easily won by Yala, who received 72% of the vote. He was sworn in as the president of Guinea-Bissau on 17 February.

Yala resigned as president of the PRS in May 2000, although he continued to play an influential role in the party.

=== Presidency ===
Kumba Yala's tenure as the country's head of state was characterized by sackings of ministers and other high officials. Concerns about the government's financial management prompted protests, strikes and the suspension of International Monetary Fund aid. Yala's relationship with General Ansumane Mané, the leader of the rebellion that had toppled Vieira in the 1998–99 civil war, was difficult. Yala attempted to promote a number of military officers in November 2000, but Mané said that Yala's list of promotions was not the one Yala had previously agreed to with Mané. Mané announced that he was taking control of the armed forces, revoking Yala's promotions and replacing the chief of staff, Veríssimo Correia Seabra. An outbreak of fighting followed, and Mané was killed in a clash with government forces a week later, on 30 November.

Yala did not veto or promulgate the draft constitution approved by the National Assembly in 2001, instead sending it back to parliament with recommendations for increased presidential powers. Yala's government claimed to have foiled a coup plot in early December 2001, although the opposition questioned its existence. Various members of opposition parties were subsequently detained and held without charge. In June 2002, he accused The Gambia of fomenting rebellion in Guinea-Bissau, a charge the Gambian foreign ministry denied; Yala even threatened an invasion of The Gambia. Yala dissolved parliament in November 2002, appointed Mário Pires as caretaker prime minister, and called early elections for February 2003. These elections were repeatedly postponed, however: first to April, then to July, then to October. Some suspected that Yala sought to manipulate the law to ensure that he would remain in power.

==== 2003 coup ====
On 12 September 2003, the electoral commission announced that it would not be able to finish voter registration in time to hold parliamentary elections as planned on 12 October. This together with a stagnant economy, political instability, and military discontent over unpaid salaries triggered a bloodless coup on 14 September. Yala was detained and placed under house arrest. General Veríssimo Correia Seabra, leader of the coup, referred to the "incapacity" of Yala's government as justification for the takeover. Yala publicly announced his resignation on 17 September, and a political agreement signed that month prohibited him from participating in politics for five years. A civilian-led transitional government led by businessman Henrique Rosa and PRS secretary general Artur Sanhá was set up at the end of September.

On 8 March 2004, ahead of legislative elections, Yala was released from house arrest. He announced that he would be participating in the PRS election campaign, despite the prohibition against his political activity. In the election, held on 28 March, the PRS won 35 out of 100 seats, making it the second largest party in the National People's Assembly, after the PAIGC.

== 2005 presidential election and afterwards ==
On 26 March 2005, Yala was chosen as the PRS candidate for 19 June presidential election by the party's national council, despite being officially banned from politics for five years. Yala submitted his candidate application to the Supreme Court on 11 April, arguing that since he had signed his agreement to respect his ban from politics at his home and not in his office, it was invalid. The Supreme Court cleared him to stand in the election in its list of approved candidates published on 10 May, with five judges in favor of permitting his candidacy and one opposed. The decision was based on the fact that Yala had resigned prior to the signing of the transitional charter which had barred him from politics, with the judges ruling that the charter should not be retroactively applied to Yala in a way contrary to his interests. Soon afterwards, on 15 May, Yala said that he was withdrawing his resignation as president and would resume office to serve out the remainder of his term. Although this increased the country's political tension, the declaration did not appear to lead to much immediate consequence; a rally of some of Yala's supporters was held two days later and was dispersed by police with tear gas.

In late May, ten days after declaring his resignation withdrawn, he occupied the presidential palace at night with a group of armed men for about four hours before leaving, according to an announcement by the army. According to official results he came in third in 19 June election with 25% of the vote, behind Malam Bacai Sanhá and Nino Vieira, and thus could not participate in the second round run-off. Yala said that he actually came in first, with about 38% of the vote, and that the result was a fraud. At least four people were reported killed when Yala's supporters clashed with police after the results were announced. Yala went to Senegal for talks with Senegalese President Abdoulaye Wade, along with Vieira and Sanhá, and on 27 June he said at a news conference that he accepted the result in the interest of peace and democracy, while still claiming to have actually won. Yala said on this occasion that he "rejected violence on principle" and predicted that he would eventually regain the presidency, noting that his opponents were older than himself "and tomorrow they will disappear."

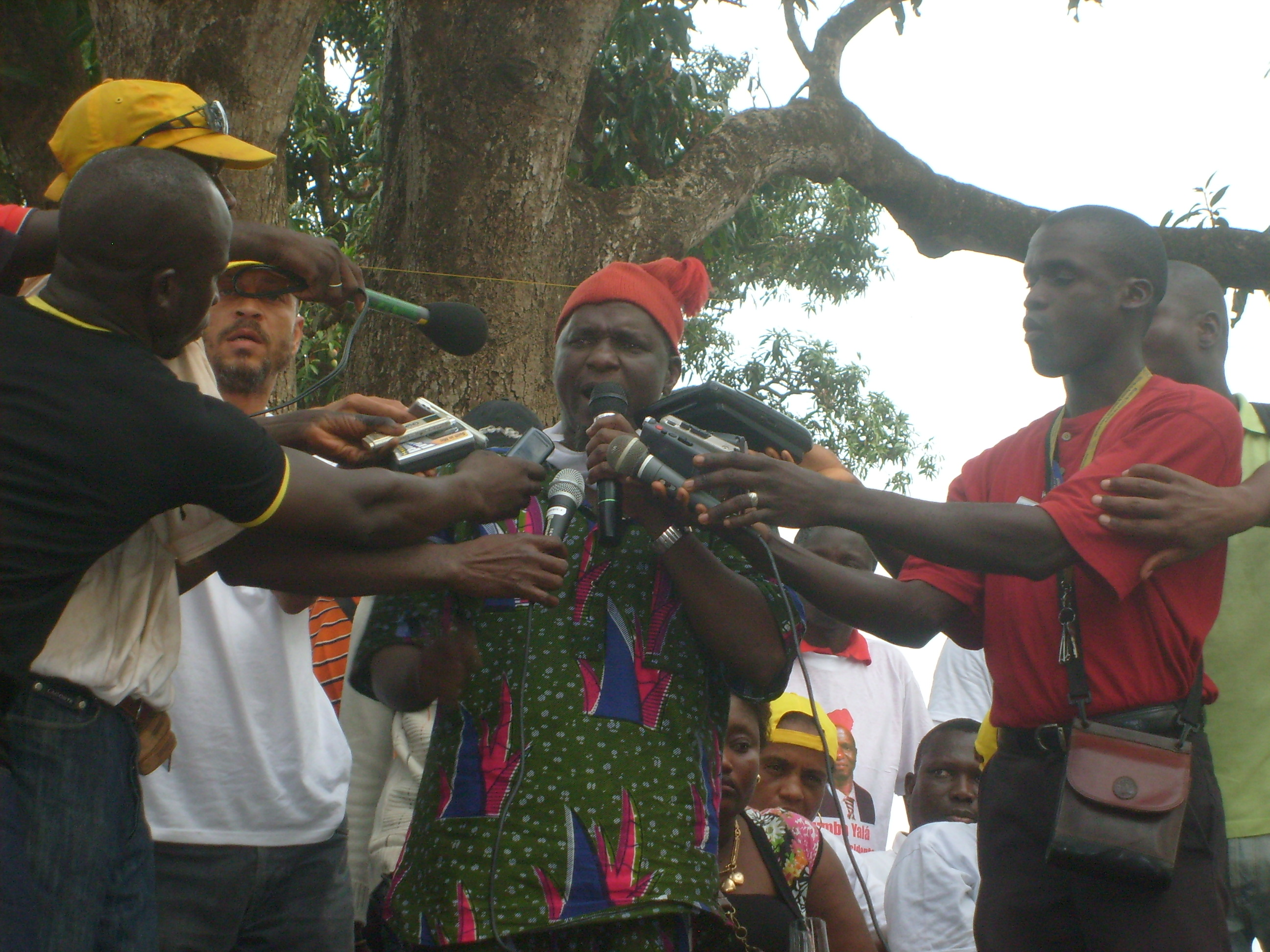
Yala campaigning at 2009 presidential elections

On 2 July, Yala announced his support for Vieira's candidacy in the second round. He called Vieira "a symbol of the construction of the Guinean state and of national unity because he proclaimed our independence in the hills of Boe" and said that he could "be relied upon to defend our national independence, to oppose neo-colonialism, to build the republic and promote peace, stability and above all, national reconciliation". Given Yala's sharp hostility to Vieira in previous years, this endorsement was viewed as surprising by many, and there was reportedly significant dissatisfaction with the decision among Yala's supporters. The second round, held on 24 July, resulted in Vieira's victory.

On 27 October 2006, Yala returned to Guinea-Bissau after a year of voluntary exile in Morocco. On 12 November he was elected as President of the PRS with about 70% of the vote at the party's third ordinary congress, defeating Alberto Nambeia, although his re-election was disputed by opponents within the PRS. He denounced the government of prime minister Aristides Gomes as "illegitimate and illegal" and said that it should be dissolved and early parliamentary elections should be held.

In May 2007, following an appeal for the annulment of the third ordinary congress by a faction of the PRS opposed to Yala, the Regional Court of Bissau cancelled the congress' resolutions and removed Yala from the party leadership. On 23 August 2007, however, the Supreme Court of Guinea-Bissau reversed that decision and restored Yala to the party leadership.

After spending more time in exile in Morocco, Yala returned to Bissau on 7 July 2008 to register for the November 2008 parliamentary election. On that occasion, he predicted that the PRS would win the election with a majority of seats. Soon after his return, he converted to Islam in the city of Gabú on 18 July 2008, taking the name Mohamed Yalá Embaló. He also learned to speak Arabic. In the November 2008 election, PAIGC officially won a majority of seats, defeating the PRS. Yala initially disputed the official results and alleged fraud, although he later accepted PAIGC's victory and said that the PRS would be a constructive opposition.

President Nino Vieira was killed by soldiers on 2 March 2009. In April, the PRS designated Yala as its candidate for the June 2009 presidential election. Some in the party who opposed Yala's "system of monopoly" instead proposed the candidacy of Baltazar Lopes Fernandes, but they were unsuccessful.

== Death ==
Yala suffered a "sudden cardiopulmonary arrest" and died on the night of 3–4 April 2014, aged 61. His personal security chief, Alfredo Malu, said that he "had a malaise on Thursday night" and died in the early hours of the next morning. The government announced that Yala had died of a heart attack, that it would have a "special session of cabinet" at 9:00 and that his body was taken to Bra military hospital. Malu added that the sudden illness late in the day had prevented him from meeting PRS candidates in preparation for the parliamentary election to be held on 13 April 2014. He was survived by his wife, Elisabete Yala, and their children.

== Notes ==
Political offices
Preceded by Malam Bacai Sanhá; Acting	President of Guinea-Bissau; 2000–2003	Succeeded by Veríssimo Correia Seabra as Chairman of the Military Committee for the Restoration of Constitutional and Democratic Order of Guinea-Bissau
