= Elections in Guinea-Bissau =

Elections in Guinea-Bissau take place within the framework of a multi-party democracy and a semi-presidential system. Both the President and the National People's Assembly are directly elected by voters.

== Latest election ==
=== Presidential ===
In the first round of voting Domingos Simões Pereira led the field, with 40.13% of the vote. Incumbent president José Mário Vaz finished fourth in the first round of voting, failing to progress to the runoff. According to the preliminary and final results published by the national commission of elections, Umaro Sissoco Embaló won the runoff vote against Simões Pereira, 54% to 46%.

Candidate	Party	First round		Second round	
Candidate	Party	Votes	%	Votes	%
Domingos Simões Pereira	African Party for the Independence of Guinea and Cape Verde	222,870	40.13	254,468	46.45
Umaro Sissoco Embaló	Madem G15	153,530	27.65	293,359	53.55
Nuno Gomes Nabiam	Assembly of the People United	73,063	13.16		
José Mário Vaz	Independent	68,933	12.41		
Carlos Gomes Júnior	Independent	14,766	2.66		
Baciro Djá	Patriotic Front of National Salvation	7,126	1.28		
Vicente Fernandes	Democratic Convergence Party	4,250	0.77		
Mamadú Iaia Djaló	New Democracy Party	2,813	0.51		
Idrissa Djaló	National Unity Party	2,569	0.46		
Mutaro Intai Djabi	Independent	2,385	0.43		
Gabriel Fernando Indi	United Social Democratic Party	1,982	0.36		
António Afonso Té	Republican Party for Independence and Development	1,061	0.19		
Total		555,348	100.00	547,827	100.00
Valid votes		555,348	98.04	547,827	98.97
Invalid/blank votes		11,125	1.96	5,694	1.03
Total votes		566,473	100.00	553,521	100.00
Registered voters/turnout		761,676	74.37	761,676	72.67
Source: CNE, CNE

=== Parliamentary ===
Party	Votes	%	Seats	+/–
PAI – Terra Ranka (PAIGC–UM–PCD–PSD–MDG)	264,240	39.42	54	+6
Madem G15	163,509	24.39	29	+2
Party for Social Renewal	100,429	14.98	12	–9
Guinean Workers' Party	54,784	8.17	6	New
Assembly of the People United	29,787	4.44	1	–4
Resistance of Guinea-Bissau-Bafatá Movement	10,989	1.64	0	0
New Democracy Party	7,111	1.06	0	–1
Patriotic Front of National Salvation	6,379	0.95	0	0
National Convergence for Freedom and Development	5,200	0.78	0	New
African National Congress	4,526	0.68	0	0
African Party for Peace and Social Stability	4,272	0.64	0	New
Light Party	3,021	0.45	0	New
Social Democratic Movement	3,020	0.45	0	New
Guiné NOBU	2,600	0.39	0	New
National Unity Party	2,368	0.35	0	0
Republican Party for Independence and Development	2,363	0.35	0	0
African Party for Freedom and Development	1,657	0.25	0	New
Our Homeland Party	1,155	0.17	0	New
United Social Democratic Party	1,070	0.16	0	New
Alliance for the Republic	757	0.11	0	New
Manifest Party of the People	717	0.11	0	0
Democratic Centre	303	0.05	0	0
Total	670,257	100.00	102	0
Valid votes	670,257	94.26		
Invalid/blank votes	40,801	5.74		
Total votes	711,058	100.00		
Registered voters/turnout	893,618	79.57		
Source: CNE, O Democrata, CNE

== Electoral history ==
Although Portuguese colonies elected members to the National Assembly, it was not until the 1960s that an elected body was created to represent the territory of Portuguese Guinea. A 15-seat Legislative Council was created in 1963, although only a minority of members were elected by a franchise restricted by literacy and tax-paying requirements.

Arguably the first elections to take place under universal suffrage were those organised by the African Party for the Independence of Guinea and Cape Verde (PAIGC), a pro-independence rebel group that occupied most of the territory by the early 1970s. The PAIGC organised a series of elections to regional councils in the 11 regions that they controlled, whose members then elected a National Assembly. Although the vote was open to all residents over the age of 17, voters were presented with a single list of PAIGC candidates to approve or vote against. The lists were approved by 97% of voters.

In the same year the Legislative Council became the Legislative Assembly, with five of the 17 members to be elected directly. However, the restrictive franchise requirements and PAIGC occupation of much of the country meant that only 7,824 people were registered to vote. The election was held on a non-partisan basis.

Following formal independence in 1974, parliamentary elections were held between December 1976 and January 1977. These were held using the same system as the 1972 elections, although voters in some parts of the country voted for unofficial candidates, leading to the PAIGC's vote share dropping to 80%. Elections were held under the same format in 1984 and 1989, with the PAIGC lists being approved by 96% of voters in 1989.

Multi-party democracy was introduced in May 1991, and general elections were held after several delays in 1994. The President was elected by public vote for the first time using a two-round system; João Bernardo Vieira of the PAIGC narrowly defeated Kumba Ialá of the Party for Social Renewal (PRS) by 52%–48% in the second round of voting. The PAIGC received 46% of the vote in the National People's Assembly elections, winning a majority of the seats.

Following a civil war that resulted in the overthrow of Vieira, general elections were held for a second time in late 1999, with a presidential runoff in January 2000. This time Ialá defeated the PAIGC candidate and acting President Malam Bacai Sanhá. The PRS emerged as the largest party in the National People's Assembly, but held only 38 of the 102 seats; the PAIGC finished third behind the Resistance of Guinea-Bissau-Bafatá Movement.

Ialá was overthrown in a coup in September 2003, and after several delays, parliamentary elections were held in March 2004. The PAIGC re-emerged as the largest party, but failed to win a majority of seats and formed a government together with the PRS. Presidential elections were held the following year, and although Malam Bacai Sanhá of the PAIGC received the most votes in the first round, he was defeated by the now-independent candidate João Bernardo Vieira in the second.

The next parliamentary elections were held in 2008 and resulted in a landslide victory for the PAIGC, which won 67 of the 100 seats. Vieira was assassinated in March 2009, and presidential elections resulted in a victory for Sanhá at the third attempt. Sanhá died in January 2012, and early elections were required to elect a successor. A first round was held in March, but the run-off between Carlos Gomes Júnior of the PAIGC and Ialá was cancelled after a military coup on 12 April.

A transition to civilian rule was completed in 2014 after general elections saw José Mário Vaz become President after defeating independent candidate Nuno Gomes Nabiam in the runoff, whilst the PAIGC retained its parliamentary majority, winning 57 of the 102 seats in the expanded National People's Assembly.

== Electoral system ==
=== President ===
The President is elected using the two-round system.

=== National People's Assembly ===
The electoral system used between 1972 and 1989 involved voters electing regional councils, which in turn elected the members of the National People's Assembly. Voters were presented with a single list of PAIGC candidates to approve or vote against, although in some elections people voted for unofficial candidates. A voter turnout of at least 50% was required to validate the election in each sector.

The country's current electoral law was passed on 15 May 1985. The National People's Assembly has 102 directly elected members; 100 are elected from 27 multi-member constituencies, with one single-member constituency representing citizens living abroad in Africa, and one for citizens living in Europe. Voters are required to be at least 18 years old and hold Guinea-Bissau citizenship, whilst candidates had to be at least 21.
