= List of political parties in Guinea-Bissau =

This article lists political parties in Guinea-Bissau. Guinea-Bissau has a multi-party system with numerous political parties, in which no one party often has a chance of gaining power alone, and parties must work with each other to form coalition governments.

== Active parties ==
=== Parliamentary parties ===
| Party | Abbr. | Founded | Leader | Political position | Ideology | Assembly |
|---|---|---|---|---|---|---|
| African Party for the Independence of Guinea and Cape Verde; Partido Africano para a Independência da Guiné e Cabo Verde | PAIGC | 1956 | Domingos Simões Pereira | Centre-left | Democratic socialism; Social democracy; Left-wing nationalism; African nationalism; Pan-Africanism | 47 / 102 |
| Movement for Democratic Alternation, Group of 15; Movimento para Alternância Democrática, Grupo dos 15 | Madem G15 | 2018 | Braima Camará | Centre-left | Social democracy | 27 / 102 |
| Party for Social Renewal; Partido da Renovação Social | PRS | 1992 | Kumba Ialá | Centre to centre-left | Social liberalism; Reformism; Agrarianism | 21 / 102 |
| Assembly of the People United–Democratic Party of Guinea-Bissau; Assembleia do povo Unido – Partido Democrático da Guiné-Bissau | APU-PDGB | 2014 | Nuno Gomes Nabiam | Centre-left | Social democracy | 5 / 102 |
| New Democracy Party; Partido da Nova Democracia | PND | 2007 | Mamadú Iaia Djaló | | | 1 / 102 |
| Union for Change; União para a Mudança | UM | 1994 | | | | 1 / 102 |

=== Other parties ===
- United Social Democratic Party (Partido Unido Social Democrático) (PUSD)
- Guinean League for Ecological Protection (Liga Guineense para Proteccao Ecologica) (LIPE)
- Democratic Socialist Party (Partido Democrático Socialista) (PDS)
- Democratic Social Front (Frente Democrática Social) (FDS)
- Resistance of Guinea-Bissau-Bafatá Movement (Resistência da Guiné-Bissau-Movimento Bafatá) (RGB-MB)
- National Unity Party (Partido da Unidade Nacional) (PUN)
- United People's Alliance (Aliança Popular Unida) (APU)
- National Union for Democracy and Progress (União Nacional para a Democracia e o Progresso) (UNDP)
- Workers' Party (Partido dos Trabalhadores) (PT)
- Manifest Party of the People (Partido do Manifesto do Povo) (PMP)
- Socialist Party of Guinea-Bissau (Partido Socialista da Guiné-Bissau) (PSGB)
- Guinean Democratic Movement (Movimento Democrático Guineense)
- Guinean Civic Forum–Social Democracy (Fórum Cívico Guineense-Social Democracia) (FCG/SD)
- Guinean People's Party (Partido Popular Guineense) (PPG)
- Democratic Convergence Party (Partido da Convergência Democrática) (PCD)
- Republican Party for Independence and Development (Partido Republicano para a Independência e Desenvolvimento) (PRID)
- Social Democratic Party (Partido Social Democrática) (PSD)
- Movemento Patriotico (MP)
- The Organisation of Civic Democracy - Renewed Hope (Organização Cívica da Democracia - Esperança Renovada) (OCD-ER)
- Patriotic Front of National Salvation (Frente Patriótica de Salvação Nacional) (FREPASNA)

== See also ==
- Politics of Guinea-Bissau
