= Democratic Front (Guinea-Bissau) =

Political party in Guinea-Bissau

The Democratic Front (Portuguese: Frente Democrática, FD) was a political party in Guinea-Bissau.

== History ==
The party was established in 1991 by Aristide Menezes. After Menezes' death in 1994, Canjura Indjai became party leader. It contested the 1994 elections as part of the Union for Change (UM) alliance. The UM won six seats in the National People's Assembly, one of which was given to the FD and taken by Indjai.

Following the civil war in 1998 and 1999, the FD joined the Democratic Alliance. The Alliance won three seats in the 1999 elections, with Indjai retaining his seat in the Assembly. The party left the Alliance in 2003 and joined the United Platform PU) coalition. The 2004 elections saw the PU fail to win a seat in the Assembly.

The party supported runner-up Malam Bacai Sanhá in the 2005 presidential elections, and did not contest the 2008 parliamentary elections. It supported Sanhá again in the 2009 presidential elections, which he won in the second round. It later supported the 2012 coup, which followed presidential elections after Sanhá's death.
