= 2019 Guinea-Bissau presidential election =

- 24 November 2019 (first round); 29 December 2019 (second round)
- Registered: 761,676
- Turnout: 74.37% (first round); 72.67% (second round)
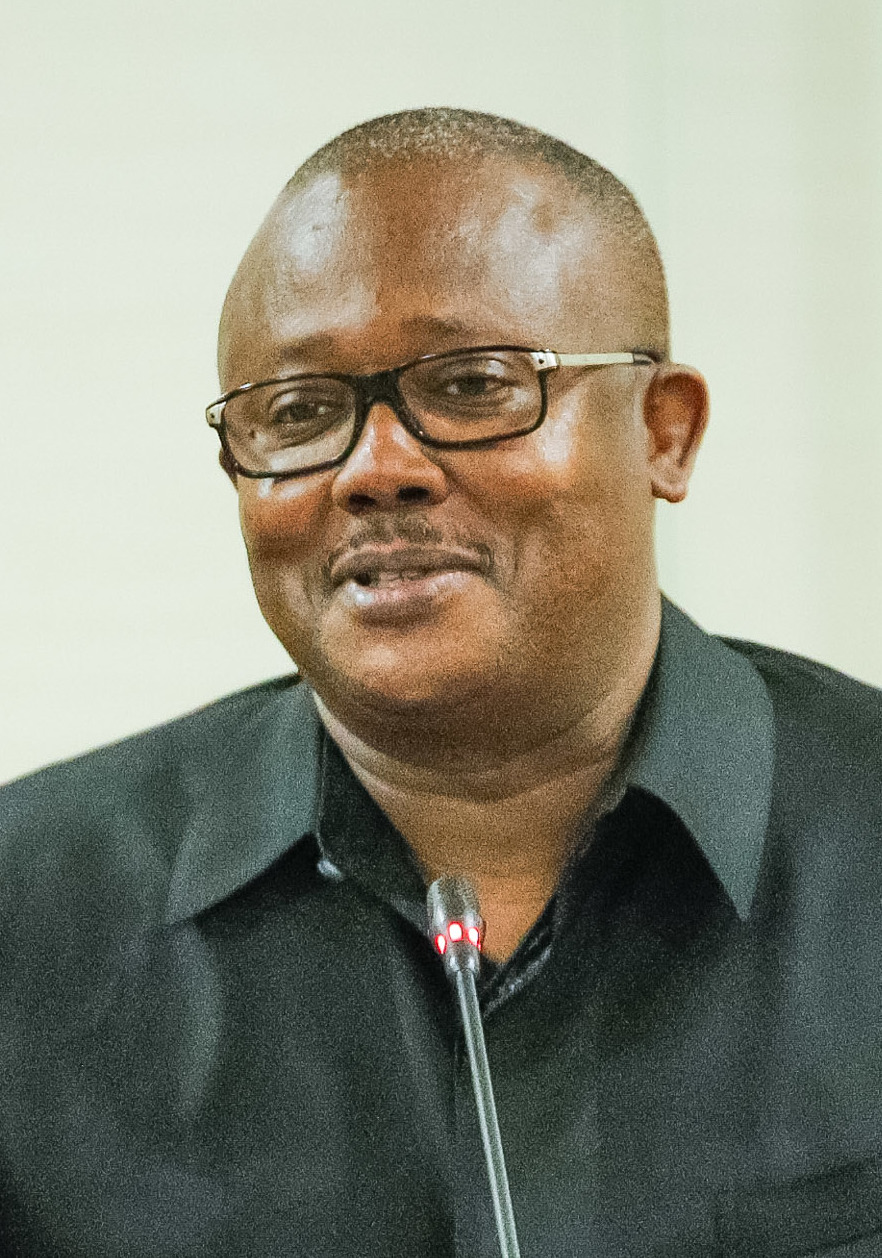

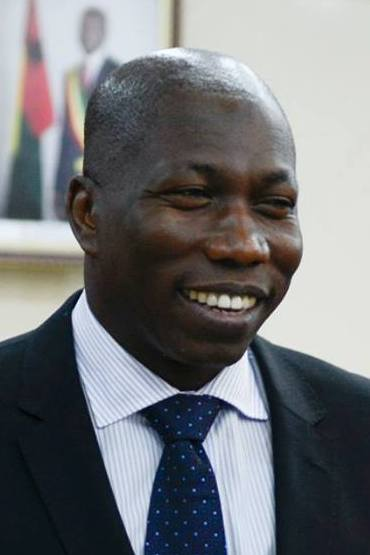
Nominee	Umaro Sissoco Embaló	Domingos Simões Pereira
Party	Madem G15	PAIGC
Popular vote	293,359	254,468
Percentage	53.55%	46.45%
President before election
José Mário Vaz
PAIGC
Elected President
Umaro Sissoco Embaló
Madem G15

Presidential elections were held in Guinea-Bissau on 24 November 2019. As no candidate received a majority of the vote, a second round was held on 29 December. Incumbent president José Mário Vaz finished fourth in the first round of voting, failing to progress to the runoff. Umaro Sissoco Embaló won the second round with 54% of the vote, becoming the first president to be elected without the backing of the PAIGC since 1999–2000.

== Background ==
Guinea-Bissau returned to constitutional order in 2014 with the election of Vaz as president. Vaz won the 2014 presidential election as the PAIGC’s candidate but fell out with the party after he dismissed his Prime Minister Domingos Simões Pereira, leader of the PAIGC, in August 2015. During his presidency (2014-2019), Vaz has worked with seven prime ministers – an indicator of the degree of political instability that characterises his administration.

On 26 October 2019 violent protests followed the dismissal of Prime-Minister Aristides Gomes. Vaz met with a senior military leader as rumors of a coup took hold. On 9 November 2019 President Vaz yielded to pressure from the West African regional organization ECOWAS and the African Union and reinstated his former prime minister.

== Candidates ==
The elections were contested by 12 candidates, including:

- José Mário Vaz, incumbent president. An economist elected in 2014 as the candidate of the African Party for the Independence of Guinea and Cape Verde (PAIGC), but now running as an independent; the first president to complete his five year term in office
- Gabriel Fernando Indi of the United Social Democratic Party, a former football club director
- Umaro Sissoco Embaló of Madem G15, a former prime minister
- Carlos Gomes Júnior, a former prime minister running as an independent
- Baciro Djá of the Patriotic Front of National Salvation (FREPASNA), another former prime minister
- Nuno Gomes Nabiam, an MP from the Assembly of the People United
- Mamadú Iaia Djaló of the New Democracy Party, a former foreign minister.

== Results ==
In the first round of voting Domingos Simões Pereira led the field, with 40.13% of the vote. Incumbent president José Mário Vaz finished fourth in the first round of voting, failing to progress to the runoff. According to the preliminary and final results published by the national commission of elections, Umaro Sissoco Embaló won the runoff vote against Simões Pereira, 54% to 46%.

Candidate	Party	First round		Second round	
Candidate	Party	Votes	%	Votes	%
Domingos Simões Pereira	African Party for the Independence of Guinea and Cape Verde	222,870	40.13	254,468	46.45
Umaro Sissoco Embaló	Madem G15	153,530	27.65	293,359	53.55
Nuno Gomes Nabiam	Assembly of the People United	73,063	13.16		
José Mário Vaz	Independent	68,933	12.41		
Carlos Gomes Júnior	Independent	14,766	2.66		
Baciro Djá	Patriotic Front of National Salvation	7,126	1.28		
Vicente Fernandes	Democratic Convergence Party	4,250	0.77		
Mamadú Iaia Djaló	New Democracy Party	2,813	0.51		
Idrissa Djaló	National Unity Party	2,569	0.46		
Mutaro Intai Djabi	Independent	2,385	0.43		
Gabriel Fernando Indi	United Social Democratic Party	1,982	0.36		
António Afonso Té	Republican Party for Independence and Development	1,061	0.19		
Total		555,348	100.00	547,827	100.00
Valid votes		555,348	98.04	547,827	98.97
Invalid/blank votes		11,125	1.96	5,694	1.03
Total votes		566,473	100.00	553,521	100.00
Registered voters/turnout		761,676	74.37	761,676	72.67
Source: CNE, CNE

== Aftermath ==
Simões Pereira disputed the results. Although neither the supreme court of Guinea-Bissau nor the parliament had given its approval for the official swearing-in ceremony, Sissoco Embaló had organized an alternative swearing-in ceremony in a hotel in Bissau to announce himself as legal president of Guinea-Bissau. Several politicians in Guinea-Bissau, including prime minister Aristides Gomes, accused Sissoco Embaló of arranging a coup d'état, although outgoing president Vaz stepped down to allow Embaló to take power.

Embaló was inaugurated as president in a ceremony in Bissau on 27 February 2020. However, the PAIGC rejected the results, claiming there had been electoral fraud, and submitted a petition to the Supreme Court. Holding a majority in National People's Assembly, the party swore in Speaker Cipriano Cassamá as a rival president. Cassamá resigned after a day, saying he had received death threats.

Embaló appointed Nuno Gomes Nabiam as Prime Minister. However, former Prime Minister Aristides Gomes refused to resign. After Embaló, a former army general, took office, armed soldiers were deployed at all government offices and the national radio.
