= 2025 Guinea-Bissau general election =

- 23 November 2025
- Presidential election
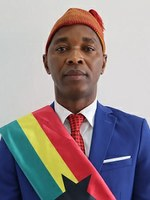

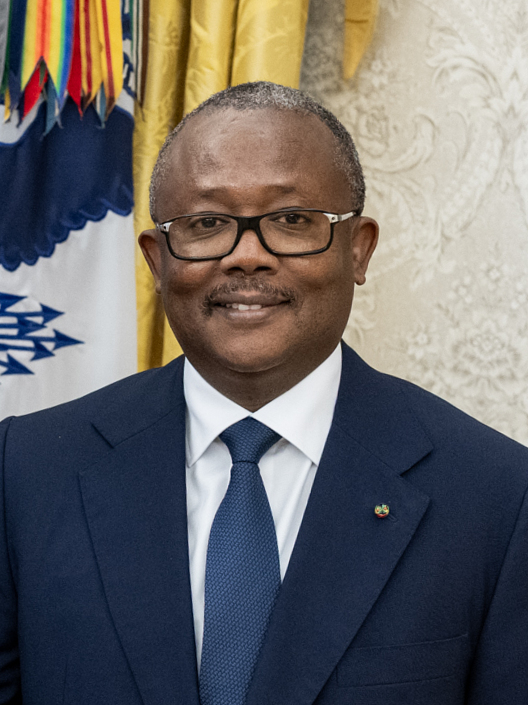
Nominee	Fernando Dias	Umaro Sissoco Embaló
Party	PRS	Madem G15
Alliance	PAI–Terra Ranka	Nô Kumpu Guiné
Popular vote	278,846	268,516
Percentage	49.43%	47.60%
- Results by region
President before election
Umaro Sissoco Embaló
Madem G15
Elected President
Election results annulled
Horta Inta-A Na Man named Transitional President
- Parliamentary election
- All 102 seats in the National People's Assembly; 52 seats needed for a majority
Prime Minister before	Prime Minister after
Braima Camará; Madem G15	Election results annulled Ilídio Vieira Té (PRS) named Prime Minister

General elections were held in Guinea-Bissau on 23 November 2025 to elect the president and members of the National People's Assembly. Separate parliamentary and presidential elections were planned. Parliamentary elections had been scheduled for 24 November 2024 after President Umaro Sissoco Embaló dissolved the opposition-controlled parliament on 4 December 2023 following the 2023 Guinea-Bissau coup attempt. However, Embaló postponed the parliamentary elections in early November 2024. Presidential elections had been scheduled for December 2024. They were later also postponed and Embaló's term ended on 27 February 2025. However, he remained in power and ran for re-election in late 2025. The opposition and civil society called it an "institutional coup".

Following the election, both Embaló and Fernando Dias, who had been endorsed by the main opposition party PAIGC, claimed victory in the presidential vote. However on 26 November, a coup d'état occurred a day before the official results were expected to be released, resulting in Embaló's arrest and the formation of the High Military Command for the Restoration of National Security and Public Order by the country's military. On 2 December, the National Electoral Commission announced the destruction of most of the election tallies by armed men, leaving it unable to release the results of the vote. However, Correio da Manhã obtained the minutes with the results, showing Dias had received around 10,000 more votes than Embaló.

== Background ==
In 2019, Umaro Sissoco Embaló won the presidential election runoff vote against Domingos Simões Pereira, 54% to 46%. Simões Pereira disputed the results. Although neither the Supreme Court of Guinea-Bissau nor the parliament had given its approval for the official swearing-in ceremony, Embaló organized an alternative swearing-in ceremony in a hotel in Bissau to announce himself as legal president of Guinea-Bissau. Several politicians in Guinea-Bissau, including Prime Minister Aristides Gomes, accused Embaló of arranging a coup d'état, although the outgoing President Vaz stepped down to allow Embaló to take power.

In 2022, Embaló dissolved parliament, leading to an opposition victory in the 2023 parliamentary elections. Embaló dissolved parliament again on 4 December 2023, claiming an "attempted coup" had prevented him from returning home from COP28 climate conference. In response to the dissolution, Parliamentary Speaker Domingos Simões Pereira accused the president of carrying out a "constitutional coup d'état." Incumbent president Embaló would go on to fire Prime Minister Geraldo Martins, who was appointed by the PAIGC-led National Assembly and instead appointed Rui Duarte de Barros by presidential decree.

Embaló, who is eligible to run for a second term, has given contradictory signs about his intentions. In September 2024, after a meeting of the Council of Ministers, he announced that he decided not to run after a conversation with his wife, but in November 2024, he stated his intention to remain as president "for many years", beyond 2030.

On 23 February 2025, Embaló set the date of the presidential and legislative elections on 30 November 2025. At the same time, disputes arose over when his term as president would end, as opposition groups said his term expires on 27 February 2025, while the Supreme Court ruled that it expires on 4 September 2025. On 3 March, Embaló announced that he would run again for president in the election. On 7 March, Embaló moved the date of the elections to the 23 November 2025.

On 7 August 2025, Embaló dismissed Prime Minister Rui Duarte de Barros (a PAIGC member of Parliament) and appointed Braima Camará, a member of the Madem G15, with the explicit mission of organizing the elections. Although Camará had once strongly criticized Embaló and signed an agreement with Domingos Simões Pereira to "save democracy and the rule of law", rumors of his reconciliation with the president had circulated since July 2025.

== Electoral system ==
The president is elected using the two-round system. Article 33 of Guinea-Bissau's Electoral Law prohibits the publishing of any opinion polls.

The 102 members of the National People's Assembly are elected by two methods. 100 by closed list proportional representation from 27 multi-member constituencies and two from single-member constituencies representing expatriate citizens in Africa and Europe.

== Issues ==
Various opposition parties have criticized incumbent president Embaló, accusing him of authoritarianism and wanting to establish a dictatorship. Beyond the outcome of the elections, the broader narrative in Guinea-Bissau in 2024 will revolve around the imperative of establishing and maintaining momentum for a stable system of governance. Central to this narrative will be the efforts to fortify institutional frameworks that serve as guardrails against the abuse of power.

According to observers, the conditions for elections have not been met due to organisational challenges. One major issue is the expiration of the terms of the commission members responsible for overseeing elections. Typically, these members would be appointed by parliament, however, since the parliament has been dissolved, there is no entity in place to facilitate the appointment of new commission members.

On 25 September 2025, the Supreme Court of Guinea-Bissau disqualified the opposition Pai Terra Ranka coalition from contesting the election after it failed to submit a list of candidates 72 hours before the deadline of candidate registration on 25 September.

On 14 October 2025, the Supreme Court disqualified former Prime Minister and Speaker of the National People's Assembly, Domingos Simões Pereira, who had returned from a nine-month exile, from running. This made the election the first since independence in which the PAIGC was not represented.

== Presidential candidacies ==
The final list of candidates for President of Guinea-Bissau is as follows. The positions on the ballot were drawn by the National Elections Commission (CNE) on 21 October.

Candidate		Supporting Party	
1	José Mário Vaz	National Convergence for Freedom and Development	COLIDE–GB
2	Mamadú Iaia Djaló	Alliance for the Republic	APR
3	Herculano Armando Bequinsa	Democratic Renewal Party	PRD
4	Fernando Dias (Note: Dias is officially running as an independent, but was endorsed by the PAI–Terra Ranka alliance following the exclusion of their candidate Domingos Simões Pereira by the Supreme Court of Justice of Guinea-Bissau)	Inclusive Alliance Platform – Terra Ranka (Note: Coalition consisting of PAIGC, UM, PCD, MDG and PSD)	PAI–Terra Ranka
5	João de Deus Mendes	Guinea-Bissau Workers' Party	PT
6	Honorio Augusto Lopes	Front of the Struggle for the Independence of Guinea-Bissau	FLING
7	João Bernardo Vieira	African Party for Freedom and Development of Guinea	PALDG
8	Gabriel Fernando Indi	United Social Democratic Party	PUSD
9	Mario da Silva Junior	Civic Organization for Democracy – Renewed Hope	OCD–ER
10	Baciro Djá	Patriotic Front for National Salvation	FREPASNA
11	Umaro Sissoco Embaló	Republican Platform "Nô Kumpu Guiné" (Note: Coalition consisting of Madem G15, PRS, PTG, PND, MP, PRID and PRP)	PRNKG
12	Sigá Baptista (Note: Although his name will be on the ballot, Baptista has withdrawn and endorsed Fernando Dias)	Independent	

== Legislative candidates ==
The final list of parties taking part in the elections to the National People's Assembly is as follows. Since the presidential and legislative elections are separate, some parties are participating in one election, but not the other.

Placement	Party	Abbreviation
1	United Social Democratic Party	PUSD
2	Patriotic Front for National Salvation	FREPASNA
3	National Unity Movement for the Development of Guinea-Bissau	MUNDO GB
4	Party for Solution	PS
5	Socialist Workers' Party of Guinea-Bissau	PSTGB
6	Party for Social Renewal	PRS
7	African Party for Freedom and Development of Guinea	PALDG
8	Front of the Struggle for the Independence of Guinea-Bissau	FLING
9	Republican Platform "Nô Kumpu Guiné" (Note: Coalition consisting of Madem G15, PRS, PTG, PND, MP, PRID and PRP)	PRNKG
10	Lanta Cedo Party	PLC
11	Social Democratic Movement	MSD
12	Guinea-Bissau Workers' Party	PT
13	People's Party	PdP
14	Civic Organization for Democracy – Renewed Hope	OCD–ER

== Conduct ==
More than 6,780 security personnel, including units of the ECOWAS Stabilisation Force, were deployed to maintain order during and after the election. More than 200 observers monitored the conduct of the election, including representatives of ECOWAS, the African Union and the Community of Portuguese Language Countries. On 25 November, the head of the ECOWAS observer mission, Issifu Baba Braimah Kamara, said the election had been conducted peacefully.

== Results ==
Both Embaló and Fernando Dias claimed victory in the presidential election on 24 November, despite official results not having been released yet. A member of the West African observation team said Embaló had lost the election.

On 26 November, a day before the release of official results, gunfire was heard outside the presidential palace in Bissau and the National Electoral Commission, with Embaló saying that he had been arrested as part of a coup d'état carried out by Head of the Military Office of the Presidency, Brigadier General Dinis Incanha. The military subsequently declared "total control" over the country and established the High Military Command for the Restoration of National Security and Public Order. Dias was also initially reported to have been arrested, but later released a video saying that he had escaped and vowed to resist the coup. He was later given asylum at the Nigerian embassy. On 27 November, the High Military Command proclaimed army chief of staff General Horta Inta-A Na Man as head of a military government that would oversee a one-year transition period. Later that day, Embalo was released and went into exile in Senegal following negotiations by the Senegalese government. Embalo was subsequently accused by several opposition and international figures, including former Nigerian president and election monitor Goodluck Jonathan, of staging the coup to avoid losing the election.

On 29 November, protests were held in Bissau calling for the release of the election results, while three civil society groups called for a general strike and a civil disobedience campaign in order to restore "electoral truth".

On 2 December, the CNE said it was unable to publish the election results after armed men wearing balaclavas confiscated computers from 45 staff and destroyed all tally sheets except for those from Bissau and the main computer server storing the results. However, some media outlets published the minutes with the election results:

On 22 January 2026, the High Military Command issued a decree authorising elections for the legislature and the presidency to be held on 6 December 2026, after it deemed that "all the conditions for organising free, fair and transparent elections have been met".

Candidate	Party	Votes	%
Fernando Dias	Party for Social Renewal	278,846	49.43
Umaro Sissoco Embaló	Madem G15	268,516	47.60
José Mário Vaz	National Convergence for Freedom and Development	5,506	0.98
Baciro Djá	Patriotic Front of National Salvation	3,695	0.65
Herculano Armando Bequinsa	Democratic Renewal Party	1,745	0.31
Mamadú Iaia Djaló	Alliance for the Republic	1,602	0.28
Mario da Silva Junior	Civic Organization for Democracy – Renewed Hope	1,042	0.18
João de Deus Mendes	Workers' Party	923	0.16
Sigá Baptista	Independent	713	0.13
João Bernardo Vieira II	African Party for Freedom and Development of Guinea	673	0.12
Honorio Augusto Lopes	Front of the Struggle for the Independence of Guinea-Bissau	528	0.09
Gabriel Fernando Indi	United Social Democratic Party	379	0.07
Total		564,168	100.00
Valid votes		564,168	96.03
Invalid/blank votes		23,302	3.97
Total votes		587,470	100.00
Registered voters/turnout		967,392	60.73
Source: Correio da Manhã, CDN
