= 2019 Guinea-Bissau parliamentary election =

- 10 March 2019
Party	Leader	Vote %	Seats	+/–
PAIGC	Domingos Simões Pereira	35.22	47	−10
PRS	Alberto M'bunhe Nambeia	21.10	21	−20
Madem G15	Braima Camará	21.07	27	New
APU–PDGB	Nuno Gomes Nabiam	8.47	5	New
PND	Mamadú Iaia Djaló	1.50	1	0
UM	Agnelo Regalla	1.42	1	0
This lists parties that won seats. See the complete results below.
Results by constituency.
Prime Minister before	Prime Minister after
Aristides Gomes; PRID	Aristides Gomes; PRID

Parliamentary elections were held in Guinea-Bissau on 10 March 2019. They were originally scheduled for 18 November 2018 following an ECOWAS brokered agreement between President José Mário Vaz and the opposition in April 2018, but the electoral census was not completed until 20 November, and Prime Minister Aristides Gomes subsequently proposed 16 December, 30 December, or 27 January 2019 as possible alternative dates. The election date was settled following a presidential decree issued in December 2018.

The African Party for the Independence of Guinea and Cape Verde (PAIGC) won 47 of the 102 seats and remained the largest party. Although its loss of ten seats resulted in a hung parliament, pre-election agreements with the Assembly of the People United (five seats), the New Democracy Party (one seat) and the Union for Change (one seat) gave the PAIGC-led coalition a six-seat majority in the National People's Assembly.

== Electoral system ==
The 102 members of the National People's Assembly were elected by two methods; 100 by closed list proportional representation from 27 multi-member constituencies and two from single-member constituencies representing expatriate citizens in Africa and Europe.

== Conduct ==
Election day was peaceful, with President Vaz stating "no-one has been killed, no fights, no coup, without random arrests and without political prisoners. Instead, there is freedom of expression and the right to assemble." Voter turnout was reportedly high.

== Results ==
Party	Votes	%	Seats	+/–
African Party for the Independence of Guinea and Cape Verde	212,148	35.22	47	–10
Party for Social Renewal	127,104	21.10	21	–20
Madem G15	126,935	21.07	27	New
Assembly of the People United	51,049	8.47	5	New
Patriotic Front of National Salvation	13,926	2.31	0	New
Democratic Convergence Party	9,864	1.64	0	–2
New Democracy Party	9,019	1.50	1	0
Union for Change	8,535	1.42	1	0
Resistance of Guinea-Bissau-Bafatá Movement	6,959	1.16	0	0
African National Congress	6,005	1.00	0	New
Patriotic Movement	5,756	0.96	0	New
Guinean Movement for Development	4,542	0.75	0	New
Guinean Patriotic Union	4,407	0.73	0	0
Social Democratic Party	2,854	0.47	0	0
Party of Justice, Reconciliation and Labor–Platform of Democratic Forces	2,849	0.47	0	New
Guinean Democratic Movement	2,789	0.46	0	New
Republican Party for Independence and Development	2,622	0.44	0	0
Democratic Centre	2,444	0.41	0	New
National Unity Party	958	0.16	0	New
Democratic Party for Development	861	0.14	0	New
Manifest Party of the People	755	0.13	0	0
Total	602,381	100.00	102	0
Valid votes	602,381	93.38		
Invalid votes	20,827	3.23		
Blank votes	21,877	3.39		
Total votes	645,085	100.00		
Registered voters/turnout	761,676	84.69		
Source: CNE (1), CNE (2)

== Aftermath ==
Following the elections, deputy President Domingos Simões Pereira of the PAIGC was initially proposed as the new Prime Minister. However, President Vaz refused to appoint him following a breakdown in relations between the two. The deadlock was finally lifted in late June 2019, when the incumbent Aristides Gomes was reappointed.
