= Francisco Fadul =

Bissau-Guinean politician

Francisco José Fadul
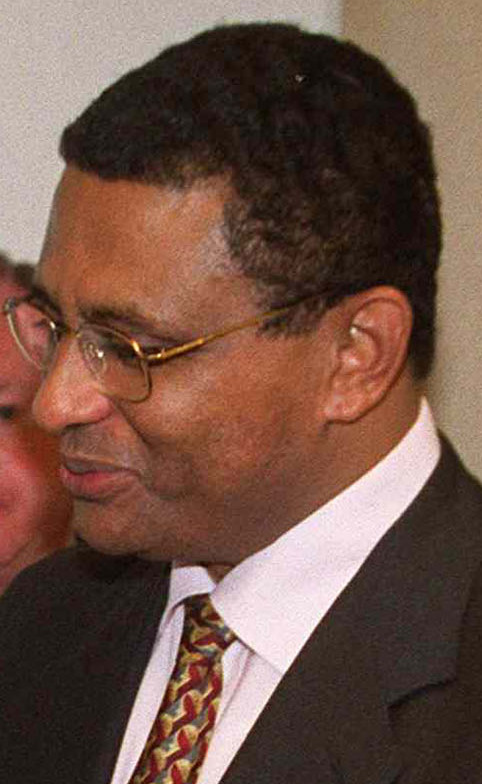

7th Prime Minister of Guinea-Bissau
- In office 3 December 1998 – 19 February 2000
- President: João Bernardo Vieira
- Preceded by: Carlos Correia
- Succeeded by: Caetano N'Tchama

Personal details
- Born: 15 December 1953 (age 72)
- Party: PUSD

Francisco José Fadul (born 15 December 1953) is a Bissau-Guinean politician who was prime minister from 3 December 1998 to 19 February 2000. He led the United Social Democratic Party (PUSD), one of the country's main political parties, from 2002 to 2006.

== Career ==
Fadul was appointed as prime minister, at the head of a national unity government, on 3 December 1998. He had previously been political adviser to General Ansumane Mané, who led the rebellion against President João Bernardo Vieira in the Guinea-Bissau Civil War; Fadul also represented Mane's junta on the Executive Joint Commission, which was established following the Abuja Peace Accord in November 1998. Shortly after he was named prime minister, Fadul, in an interview with the Portuguese newspaper Expresso, accused President Vieira of murder, beatings, defamation, and humiliating leading political figures, and he called for Vieira to be tried for these alleged crimes. He also described Vieira as a dictator, claimed that Vieira was one of the world's richest men and that Vieira's wealth nearly matched the sum of Guinea-Bissau's foreign debt, and said that Vieira was primarily responsible for the development of animosity in the country. Fadul furthermore called for the return from exile of Luís Cabral, who was deposed by Vieira in 1980. Fadul said on 23 December that the primary focus of his government would be to deal with problems related to the military and to independence war veterans.

Fadul and his unity government, including five ministers and three secretaries of state chosen by Vieira and four ministers and four secretaries of state chosen by Mané's junta, were sworn in on 20 February 1999 in the presence of Vieira and Mané. In April 1999, speaking at the first meeting of the National People's Assembly since the war, Fadul prioritized facilitating the return of refugees to their homes and said that elections would take place as planned in late 1999. He went on a tour of four European nations later in the month, seeking aid. He arrived first in Portugal on 19 April, and while there he characterized Vieira's secret police as being worse than the Portuguese secret police under Antonio de Oliveira Salazar. Vieira's spokesman, Cipriano Cassamá, condemned Fadul's remarks as "purposely offensive, aggressive language".

Following the election of Kumba Yala as president, Fadul was replaced as prime minister by Caetano Intchama in February 2000. Fadul subsequently accused Intchama of corruption, and in October 2000 Intchama announced that he planned to take legal action against Fadul due to these accusations.

He was elected as the President of the PUSD on 18 December 2002, at a party convention.

In May 2005, Fadul was initially barred from running for president in the 2005 presidential election by the Supreme Court, due to a technicality. According to the Court, two people who were indicated as signing Fadul's nomination papers had not confirmed signing them. A PUSD spokesman expressed the view that Fadul had actually been excluded because his father was Lebanese. The Court reversed itself and approved Fadul's candidacy shortly afterward, including him in its final list of candidates on 18 May. Running as the PUSD presidential candidate, he placed fourth with 2.85% of the vote in the election, held on 19 June 2005.

In 2006, Fadul requested that Namuano Dias, a member of PUDS who was serving in the government as Minister of Justice, resign from the government because he had been accused of corruption. Dias and Prime Minister Aristides Gomes rejected this, however, and Fadul responded by resigning from the PUSD leadership and leaving politics; he also left his position as personal advisor to President Vieira. He returned to politics in the next year, establishing a new party, the Party for Democracy, Development and Citizenship (PADEC), in May 2007. He also challenged the leadership of PUSD in court and maintained that he was the party's legitimate president. On 19 July 2007, he demanded the resignation or dismissal of the government of Prime Minister Martinho Ndafa Cabi, the actions of which he strongly criticized, as well as the dissolution of the National People's Assembly, to be followed by a new election in March 2008. The government was based on a pact agreed upon by three parties—the African Party for the Independence of Guinea and Cape Verde (PAIGC), the Party of Social Renewal (PRS), and the PUSD—and Fadul said that the pact was illegitimate because two of the parties (the PUSD and PRS) had disputed leaderships. He also said that the government had not presented its program for approval by the National People's Assembly.

Later, as President of the Tribunal of Accounts, Fadul said on 20 May 2008 that he planned to sue Prime Minister Cabi for libel and slander, saying that Cabi had falsely accused him of pocketing money. He also said that he wanted Cabi to explain his claim that being President of the Tribunal was incompatible with being the leader of a political party. Some have accused Fadul of taking advantage of his post as President of the Tribunal by attacking Cabi and his government, while he has said that he is merely controlling state accounts and complained that some ministries were ignoring the Tribunal's injunctions.

After Fadul criticized the military and Prime Minister Carlos Gomes Junior at a press conference on 30 March 2009, he stated on 1 April 2009 that members of the security forces had come to his home during the night and beaten him up. According to Fadul, "they hurled abuse at me and beat me repeatedly and dragged me across the floor", and "they told me I talk too much and about things that are none of my business." Raddho, a human rights group, expressed concern, saying that the attack on Fadul, together with a similar attack on the lawyer Pedro Infanda, signified a "reign of terror".

Following the assassination of President Vieira, Fadul filed to run as the PADEC candidate in the June 2009 presidential election. On 14 May 2009, however, the Supreme Court announced that his candidacy had been rejected, along with seven others. Fadul's candidacy was rejected on the grounds that he was still President of the Tribunal of Accounts and a member of the Bar, which the Supreme Court judged to be legally incompatible with his presidential candidacy.
