= Democratic Alliance (Guinea-Bissau) =

Political alliance in Guinea Bissau

The Democratic Alliance (Portuguese: Aliança Democrática, AD) was a political alliance in Guinea-Bissau.

== History ==
The alliance was established in 1999 and was initially led Jorge Mandinga. Its members initially included the Democratic Convergence Party led by Victor Mandinga (Jorge's brother) and the Democratic Front. It won three seats in the 1999 parliamentary elections.

The Alliance was part of the wider United Platform alliance for the 2004 elections, but failed to win a seat. However, it won a single seat in the 2008 parliamentary elections. It put forward Vicente Fernandes as its candidate for the 2012 presidential elections. Fernandes finished sixth with 1.4% of the vote.
