= National Union for Democracy and Progress (Guinea-Bissau) =

Political party in Guinea-Bissau

The National Union for Democracy and Progress (Portuguese: União Nacional para a Democracia e o Progresso, UNDP) is a political party in Guinea-Bissau.

== History ==
The party was established on 5 December 1997 by Abubácar Baldé. In the 1999 general elections Baldé finished sixth in the presidential elections with 5% of the vote, whilst the party won a single seat in the National People's Assembly with just under 1% of the vote.

Despite a slight increase of its vote share to 1.2% in the 2004 parliamentary elections, the party lost its only seat in the Assembly. Baldé pulled out of the 2005 presidential elections two weeks before election day, claiming the election was "infected with vices" that undermined the "political and juridical guarantees of liberty, transparency and justice."

The party failed to win a seat in the 2008 parliamentary elections, receiving just 0.3% of the vote. It did not contest the 2009 or 2012 presidential elections, but supported the 2012 military coup.
