= Social Democratic Party (Guinea-Bissau) =

Political party in Guinea-Bissau

The Social Democratic Party (Portuguese: Partido Social Democrática, PSD) is a political party in Guinea-Bissau.

== History ==
The party was established in 1995 by Joaquim Baldé. In the 1999–2000 general elections Bald was nominated as the party's presidential candidate, but finished eighth with 2.3% of the vote. In the parliamentary elections, the party won three seats in the National People's Assembly.

Prior to the 2004 parliamentary elections the party joined the Electoral Union alliance, which won two seats. It did not contest the 2005 presidential elections, but supported runner-up Malam Bacai Sanhá. In 2007 António Samba Baldé became party leader, and in the parliamentary elections the following year, the party failed to win a seat.

The PSD did not nominate a candidate for the 2009 or 2012 presidential elections. In the 2014 general elections it did not put forward a candidate for president, but ran in the parliamentary elections, receiving just 0.4% of the vote and failing to win a seat.

The alliance contested the 2023 legislative election as part of a PAIGC-led coalition, the Inclusive Alliance Platform – Terra Ranka, that won 54 out of the 102 available seats.

== Election results ==
=== National People's Assembly ===
Election	Votes	%	Seats	+/–	Position	Status
1999			3 / 102	New	▲5th	Opposition
2004	Part of the Electoral Union				5th	Opposition
2008	6,319	1.38%	0 / 100		▼9th	Extra-parliamentary
2014	2,302	0.39%	0 / 102	0	▼14th	Extra-parliamentary
2019	2,854	0.47%	0 / 102	0	14th	Extra-parliamentary
2023	Part of the Inclusive Alliance Platform					TBA
