= Resistance of Guinea-Bissau-Bafatá Movement =

Political party in Guinea-Bissau

The Resistance of Guinea-Bissau-Bafatá Movement (Portuguese: Resistência da Guiné-Bissau-Movimento Bafatá, RGB-MB) is a political party in Guinea-Bissau. Once the main opposition organisation in the country, it is today a minor party without parliamentary representation.

== History ==
The party was established as the Bafatá Movement in Portugal on 27 July 1986 by Domingos Fernandes Gomes after his childhood friend Viriato Rodrigues Pa was executed along with five others accused of attempting to overthrow the regime of João Bernardo Vieira. With the organisation gaining support from the large population of expatriate Guineans in Portugal, the PAIGC government started attempts to assassinate the RGB leadership. In 1991 it adopted its current name.

When multi-party politics was introduced in the early 1990s, the 1994 general elections saw the RGB become the largest opposition party to the PAIGC in the National People's Assembly, winning 19 of the 100 seats. Fernandes finished third in the presidential elections with 17% of the vote. In the 1999 general elections the RGB gained another 10 seats, becoming the opposition to the new ruling party, the Party for Social Renewal. Salvador Tchongó was nominated as the party's candidate for president, but finished ninth in the field with just 2% of the vote. The party joined a coalition government, but pulled out in January 2001 after claiming it was not consulted about a cabinet reshuffle.

Internal problems came to the fore when Zinha Vaz left the RGB to help establish the United Platform alliance in 2003. The party lost all its seats in the 2004 parliamentary elections, and did not contest elections in 2005, 2008, 2009 or 2012.

The party returned to active politics when it contested the 2014 parliamentary elections, but it received only 1.6% of the vote and failed to win a seat.
