= United Platform =

Political alliance in Guinea-Bissau

The United Platform (Portuguese: Plataforma Unida, PU) was a political alliance in Guinea-Bissau.

== History ==
The PU was established in 2003 as an alliance of the Democratic Convergence Party, the Democratic Front, the Democratic Social Front, FLING and the Solidarity and Work Party, and was led by Hélder Vaz Lopes, a former leader of the Resistance of Guinea-Bissau-Bafatá Movement. A co-founder was his cousin Zinha Vaz.

The alliance received 4.5% of the vote in the 2004 parliamentary elections, but failed to win a seat. The PU did not nominate a candidate for the 2005 presidential elections, but supported runner-up Malam Bacai Sanhá of the PAIGC. The PU was dissolved before the 2008 parliamentary elections.
