= United Social Democratic Party =

United Social Democratic Party is a name used by several political parties, including:

- United Social Democratic Party (Guinea-Bissau)
- United Social Democratic Party (Romania)
- Social Democratic Party of Ukraine (united)
