= Florentino Mendes Pereira =

Bissau-Guinean politician

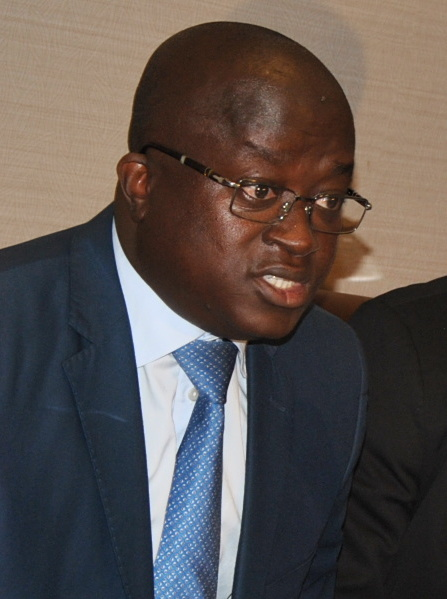
- Mendes Pereira in 2016

Personal details
- Born: 4 February 1969 (age 57) Canchungo, Guinea-Bissau
- Party: Party for Social Renewal

Florentino Mendes Pereira (born 4 February 1969) is a Bissau-Guinean politician and former Minister of Energy and Industry. He served as Minister of Energy and Industry from 2015 to 2018. He is a member of the Party for Social Renewal. As minister, he was involved in efforts to develop the country's energy sector.
