= 1973 Portuguese Guinea Legislative Assembly election =

Elections to the Legislative Assembly were held for the first and only time in Portuguese Guinea in March 1973.

== Background ==
A fifteen-member Legislative Council had been established in Portuguese Guinea in 1963. Most members were nominated by colonial authorities or business groups. A minority of its members were elected, but only a small proportion of the colony's population met the literacy and tax-paying requirements to register as a voter.

On 2 May 1972 the Portuguese National Assembly passed the Organic Law for the Overseas Territories, which provided for greater autonomy for overseas territories. The Legislative Council was converted into a Legislative Assembly, with number of members increased to 17, of which five were to be elected by direct suffrage.

In late 1972 the African Party for the Independence of Guinea and Cape Verde (PAIGC) held indirect elections to a National Assembly in the eleven regions of the territory that it controlled, with voting not taking place in the four still controlled by Portuguese forces.

== Results ==
Due to the restrictive conditions on registering to vote and more than half the country being under the control of the PAIGC, there were only 7,824 registered voters, less than 3% of the adult population.

The elections were carried out on a non-party basis, with 6,995 people casting votes, giving a voter turnout of 89.4%.
