= Democratic Convergence Party (Guinea-Bissau) =

Political party in Guinea-Bissau

The Democratic Convergence Party (Portuguese: Partido da Convergência Democrática, PCD) is a political party in Guinea-Bissau.

== History ==
The party was formed on 2 August 1991 by Víctor Mandinga. In the 1994 elections it put forward Carlos Gomes Júnior as its candidate as Mandinga was ineligible due to not having both parents born in Guinea-Bissau. In the elections to the National People's Assembly the party received 5.3% of the vote but failed to win a seat.

Prior to the 2004 elections the party joined the United Platform alliance, which failed to win a seat. It contested the 2008 elections as part of the Democratic Alliance, which won a single seat. The party ran alone in the 2014 parliamentary elections, winning two seats.

The alliance contested the 2023 legislative election as part of a PAIGC-led coalition, the Inclusive Alliance Platform – Terra Ranka, that won 54 out of the 102 available seats.

== Election results ==
=== National People's Assembly ===
Election	Votes	%	Seats	+/–	Position	Status
1994	15,411	5.30%	0 / 100	New	▲5th	Extra-parliamentary
1999	Did not contest		0 / 102	0	—	Extra-parliamentary
2004	Part of the United Platform		0 / 100	0	▲4th	Extra-parliamentary
2008	Part of the Democratic Alliance				▼8th	Opposition
2014	19,757	3.37%	2 / 102		▲4th	Opposition
2019	9,864	1.64%	0 / 102	▼2	▼6th	Extra-parliamentary
2023	Part of the Inclusive Alliance Platform					TBA
