= 2008 Guinea-Bissau parliamentary election =

- 16 November 2008
- Turnout: 82.00%
Party	Leader	Vote %	Seats	+/–
PAIGC	Carlos Gomes Júnior	49.52	67	+22
PRS	Kumba Ialá	25.21	28	−7
PRID	António Afonso Té	7.48	3	New
PND	Mamadú Iaia Djaló	2.34	1	New
AD	Jorge Mandinga	1.38	1	+1
This lists parties that won seats. See the complete results below.
Results by constituency.
Prime Minister before	Prime Minister-designate
Carlos Correia; PAIGC	Carlos Gomes Júnior; PAIGC

Parliamentary elections were held in Guinea-Bissau on 16 November 2008. The result was a victory for the African Party for the Independence of Guinea and Cape Verde (PAIGC), which won 67 out of the 100 seats in the National People's Assembly, while the Party for Social Renewal (PRS) won 28 seats.

== Background ==
=== Election date ===
At a rally in Gabú on 17 July 2007, President João Bernardo Vieira said that the election would be held together with the next presidential elections in 2009 in order to save money, but the National People's Assembly did not agree to this. However, the head of the National Electoral Commission (CNE), El Hadj Malam Mané, said on 8 December 2007 that the election would be held between 23 October and 25 November 2008. On 5 December 2007, President Vieira met with 35 party leaders, and 33 of them agreed to the CNE's date range; two parties, the National Unity Party and the Party for Democracy, Development and Citizenship (PADEC), disagreed, wanting the election to be held in March or April 2008.

In a speech before the National People's Assembly on 24 March 2008, Vieira sharply criticized Prime Minister Martinho Ndafa Kabi's government for not adequately preparing for the election, saying that "the government did not create the conditions to facilitate the holding of the legislative elections within the times required by the Constitution". He also noted that the Assembly's mandate would expire on 21 April 2008, four years after the previous elections, and that afterwards the Assembly's work have to be handled solely by its Standing Committee. On 25 March, after consultations with political party representatives, civil society, the CNE, and foreign diplomats, Vieira decided on 16 November 2008 as the date of the election.

On 27 March, the Assembly voted to extend its mandate until November by a vote of 65–2. The extension was viewed by many as a challenge to Vieira, since he had said that the Assembly's work would be handled solely by its Standing Committee after 21 April, and it provoked significant opposition. The PAIGC opposed the extension, while the PRS and the United Social Democratic Party (PUSD) supported it. A group of 20 deputies who opposed the extension said on 15 April that the extension was a violation of the Constitution and that they would not participate in any parliamentary sessions after 21 April; meanwhile, the Council of State asked the Assembly to reverse the extension. However, the Assembly voted to uphold the extension on 16 April, with 68 deputies in favor, seven opposed, and seven abstaining.

A meeting intended to assess the political situation was held on 18 April between Vieira, the government, the Assembly, and the Council of State. Subsequently, civil society organizations called for the resignation of Prime Minister Kabi, accusing him of making death threats against Fernando Gomis, a member of the Assembly, at this meeting. The organizations said that Kabi was unable to control his anger and as a result it was not appropriate for him to lead the government. Additionally, the organizations called on Vieira to not promulgate the extension of the parliamentary mandate, and they threatened to launch protests if Vieira did not dismiss Kabi's government and dissolve the Assembly.

On 19 May Vieira said that he had enacted the law providing for the extension of the parliamentary mandate. While remarking that those opposed to the extension were correct, he said that it was nevertheless necessary to approve it for the sake of peace and stability.

On 1 August the Supreme Court annulled the law extending the deputies' terms until the election. After consultations with the political class, civil society, and the Council of State, Vieira dissolved the National People's Assembly on 5 August, leaving only its Standing Committee in place. He also appointed Carlos Correia—who was previously prime minister under Vieira from 1991 to 1994 and from 1997 to 1998—as Prime Minister on the same day, replacing Kabi. A new government headed by Correia was appointed on 9 August. This government was dominated by Vieira loyalists and members of PAIGC, including PAIGC dissidents who were supporters of Vieira. The appointment of one of these PAIGC dissidents—Cipriano Cassamá—as Minister of the Interior was deemed especially significant, due to the Interior Ministry's responsibility for the election. The PRS was given five posts in the government, while the Republican Party for Independence and Development (PRID) and the United People's Alliance (APU) were each given a single post.

Shortly after Correia's appointment, a coup plot allegedly led by the head of the navy, Rear Admiral Americo Bubo Na Tchuto, was said to have been thwarted. According to an army spokesman, Na Tchuto asked other senior officers to support his plot, which was planned to occur on 7 August but when he asked the chief of staff of the army to join the plot, the latter ordered Na Tchuto's arrest. Na Tchuto was placed under house arrest, but he escaped and fled to The Gambia, where he was arrested by the Gambian authorities on 12 August .

On 11 August UN secretary-general Ban Ki-moon released a statement saying that he was "deeply concerned over the mounting political and security tensions in Guinea-Bissau" and calling "on all national stakeholders to work cooperatively and peacefully together in the national interest and in full respect of the rule of law".

An African Union pre-election assessment mission, led by Anil Gayan of Mauritius, arrived in Bissau on 18 August; the mission was intended to determine whether the appropriate conditions for holding the election existed. Members of the mission met with Prime Minister Correia on 21 August, and Correia affirmed the government's intention to hold the election on schedule in November.

By law, candidate lists had to be submitted at least 60 days before the election was held. As the available period entered its final week, Supreme Court President Maria do Ceu Silva Monteiro expressed concern on 10 September that none of the parties had submitted their lists to the National Electoral Commission or the Supreme Court, although 17 parties had stated their intention to participate in the elections. By the end of the week 21 parties and coalitions submitted candidate lists and were approved by the Supreme Court. Lists submitted by 12 other parties were rejected because they were submitted an hour too late. The approved lists included two coalitions, the Democratic Alliance and the Alliance of Patriotic Forces, as well as two new parties, PRID (led by former prime minister Aristides Gomes) and PADEC (led by former prime minister Francisco Fadul).

A European Union pre-election evaluation mission was sent to Guinea-Bissau, and on 18 September Prime Minister Correia held discussions with the mission about electoral preparations. The mission was led by Harro Adt, the Special Envoy of the Presidency of the Council of the European Union for the Mano River Basin, who expressed optimism regarding Guinea-Bissau's political situation.

After the National Election Registration Commission published the lists of registered voters, some citizens who had registered complained that they were not included on the lists. There were reportedly many errors in the lists, and the Interior Ministry promised to rectify the situation so that the final lists published by the CNE would be accurate.

In late September, PRS vice-president Ibrahima Sori Djalo alleged that President Vieira and Prime Minister Correia were planning to delay the election until 2009, possibly using an epidemic of cholera as a pretext. He also claimed that there were plans to rig the election in favor of PAIGC.

=== Finance ===
On 1 April speaking to representatives of international organizations and diplomats, Prime Minister Kabi called on the international community to assist in raising the 3.7 billion CFA francs required for the election's budget. He said that the Portuguese government had agreed to supply the necessary electoral material. Three months later, Cristian Nabitan, the secretary of state for administrative reform, announced the approval of a large shipment of electoral materials from Portugal, including ballots, ballot boxes, voting booths, and indelible ink, on July 1; he said that this shipment represented 75% of the materials Guinea-Bissau needed for the election and that another shipment would arrive in Bissau on the next day. The materials were valued at about 41 million CFA francs. The Portuguese government also said that it would send electoral observers if asked to do so.

The government and the United Nations Development Programme signed an electoral financing agreement on 10 July 2008, providing about $430,000 US dollars.

=== Census ===
An electoral census began on 3 July 2008, scheduled to end on 23 July. In the early part of the registration period, the number of citizens registering was reportedly low, although Minister of the Interior Certório Biote said on 9 July that the process was going well. PRS President Kumba Ialá returned to Bissau from Morocco on 7 July to register for the election. On this occasion, he predicted that the PRS would win the election with a majority of seats, and he called on every citizen "from 16 to 120 years old" to vote. In a speech to the nation a few days before the scheduled end of registration, Vieira also urged all citizens of voting age to register, and he said that the period could be extended to enable more people to register. It was subsequently announced on 22 July that the registration period would be extended to 26 July due to financial and logistical difficulties.

== Electoral system ==
The 102 members of the National People's Assembly were elected by proportional representation in 27 multi-member constituencies. At least 50% of voters were required to vote in a constituency to validate the results.

== Campaign ==
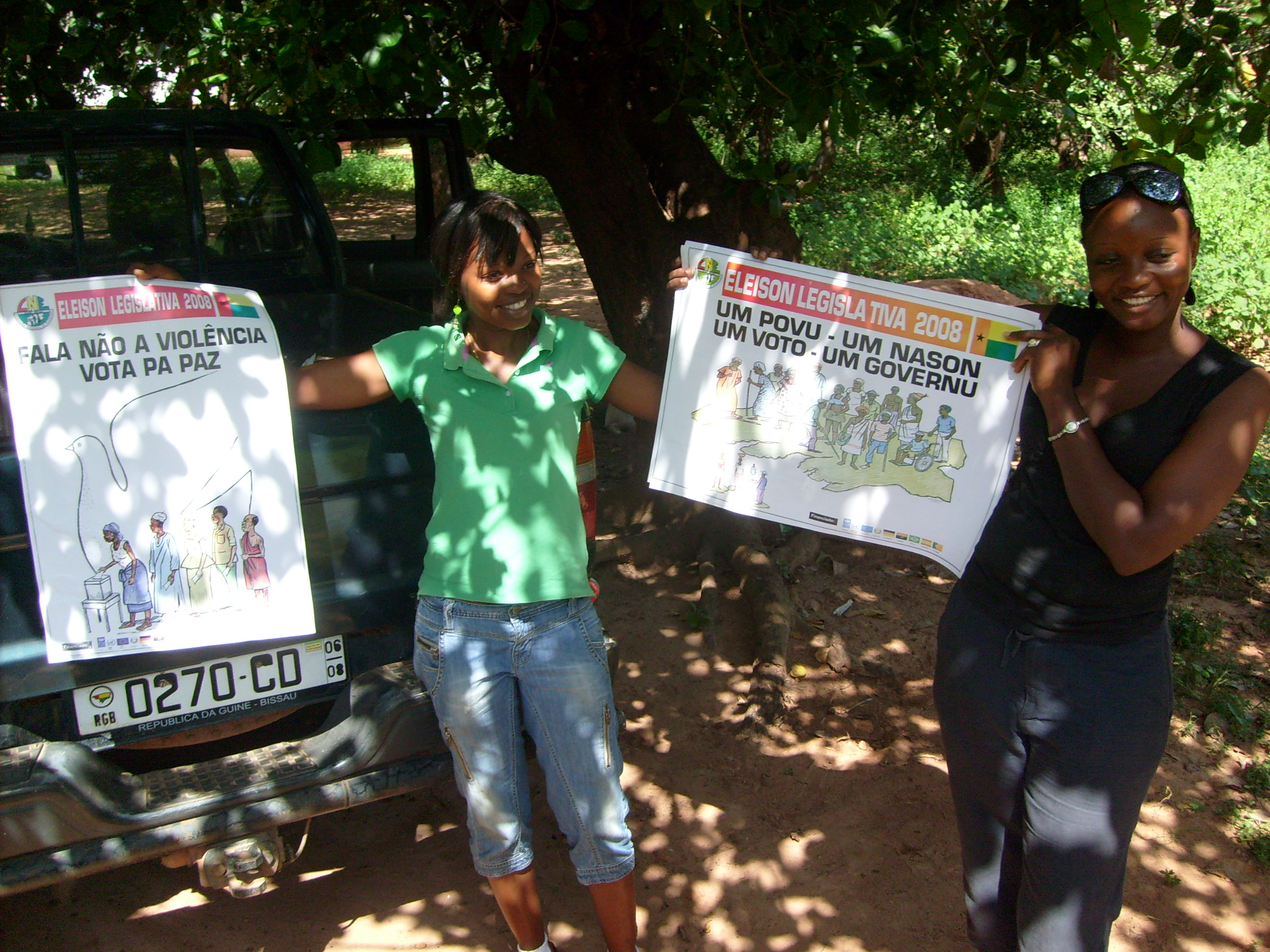
Voter education campaign posters in Crioulo language

The CNE published the final list of 575 candidates on 21 October. The electoral campaign period, scheduled to last 20 days, began a few days later. In an interview with the African Press Agency on 24 October, CNE President Mané urged the candidates to "refrain from any form of electoral corruption or acts that may threaten national security or social order and unity". He said that candidates could face disqualification and legal action if they failed to heed the warning.

As part of its campaign, PAIGC said that it had a good relationship with President Vieira, and it used images of Vieira and PAIGC President Carlos Gomes Junior together a few months earlier, raising their arms in a celebratory gesture, to illustrate this point. Vieira was reportedly unhappy about this use of his image in PAIGC's campaign.

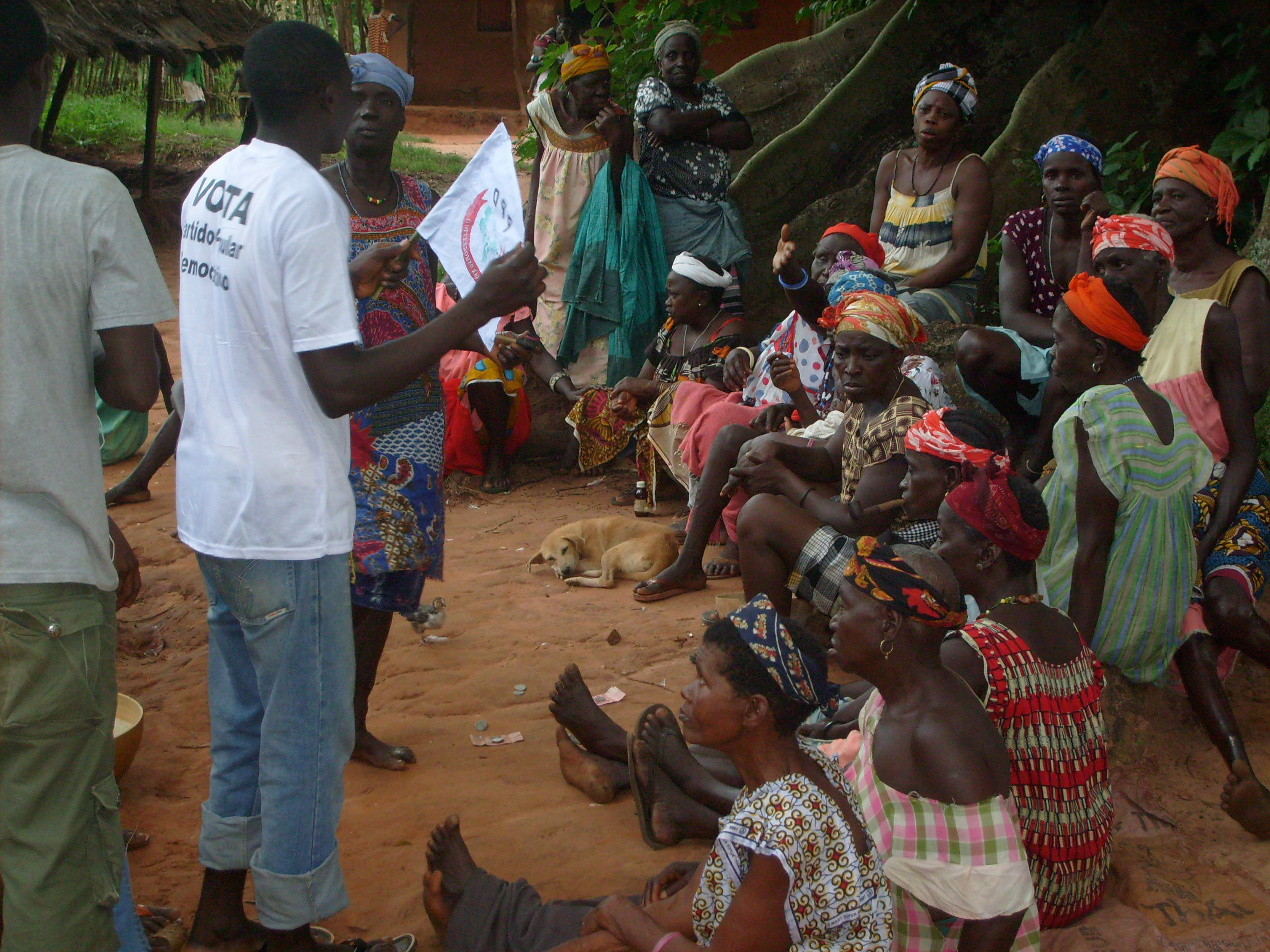
Political party community campaign in Biombo region, 2008

Drug trafficking, which is a major problem in Guinea-Bissau, has been a key issue in the election campaign, as parties have accused each other of involvement in the drug trade and taking money from cartels in order to finance their campaigns. According to observers, the state's ability to crack down on the drug trade is very limited, and some have described Guinea-Bissau as a narco-state. Gomes Junior said at a PAIGC rally on 29 October that "only blind people cannot see that certain parties are financed with drug money". PRID President Aristides Gomes pointed to a seizure of cocaine made in September 2006, during his tenure as prime minister, in order to bolster his party's image with respect to the drug trade; that cocaine seizure was marred, however, by the subsequent disappearance of the cocaine. PRS President Kumba Yala accused Vieira of trafficking drugs, describing him as the foremost drug trafficker in Guinea-Bissau. Vieira did not reply to Yala's claim.

On 15 November Johan van Hecke, the head of the European Union's observer mission, praised the CNE for its "remarkable work" and expressed his view that the country was "ready for the elections". He was, however, critical of the government's unwillingness to let the CNE have financial independence, and he also stated that it was "not exactly clear" whether appeals regarding the election's results should go to the CNE or the Supreme Court.

== Conduct ==
On election day polling stations opened at 7:00 in the morning and were scheduled to close at 5:00 in the afternoon. Van Hecke estimated turnout to be around 70 to 80%, and there were no incidents reported, raising hopes of a stabilisation of the situation. At a meeting with electoral observers on 17 November, UN special envoy Shola Omoregie described the election as a "milestone for Guinea Bissau" and a "victory for democracy". He also remarked that the election was "conducted on the whole in a transparent and orderly manner without any political or military interference".

== Results ==
Provisional results released by the CNE on 21 November showed PAIGC winning 67 out of 100 seats, while the PRS won 28, PRID won three, the National Democratic Party won one, and the Democratic Alliance won one. The CNE placed turnout at 82%. Yala, the PRS President, disputed these results and alleged fraud. Final results were announced on 26 November; the number of seats for each party in the final results was identical to the numbers in the provisional results.

Party	Votes	%	Seats	+/–
African Party for the Independence of Guinea and Cape Verde	227,350	49.52	67	+22
Party for Social Renewal	115,755	25.21	28	–7
Republican Party for Independence and Development	34,341	7.48	3	New
Workers' Party	12,600	2.74	0	New
New Democracy Party	10,726	2.34	1	New
United Social Democratic Party	7,700	1.68	0	–17
Party for Development, Democracy and Citizenship	7,076	1.54	0	New
Democratic Alliance	6,321	1.38	1	+1
Social Democratic Party	6,319	1.38	0	–
Alliance of Patriotic Forces	5,869	1.28	0	0
Democratic Centre	5,438	1.18	0	New
People's Democratic Party	5,353	1.17	0	New
Progress Party	3,095	0.67	0	New
Guinean Democratic Party	3,068	0.67	0	New
Guinean Patriotic Union	2,809	0.61	0	New
Democratic Socialist Party	1,697	0.37	0	0
National Union for Democracy and Progress	1,328	0.29	0	0
National Reconciliation Party	783	0.17	0	New
Socialist Party	639	0.14	0	–
Guinean Democratic Movement	638	0.14	0	0
Guinean League for Ecological Protection	233	0.05	0	–
Total	459,138	100.00	100	0
Valid votes	459,138	94.30		
Invalid/blank votes	27,735	5.70		
Total votes	486,873	100.00		
Registered voters/turnout	593,739	82.00		
Source: CNE

== Aftermath ==
Rebellious soldiers attacked President Vieira's home in the early hours of 23 November. The soldiers fired artillery at the house and were able to enter it during a three-hour battle with Vieira's guards, but they were repelled without ever reaching Vieira, who was in the house at the time but was unharmed. Two of Vieira's guards were killed in the attack. Vieira held a press conference later in the day, in which he said that the attack had "a single objective — to physically liquidate me", while also asserting that "the situation is under control". UN secretary-general Ban Ki-moon expressed concern and urged the rebellious soldiers to "refrain from any measures that could further destabilize the country", while Shola Omoregie said that it was "unacceptable that after legitimate elections they could attack the president and try to kill him." PAIGC President Gomes Junior said that problems in the 21st century should not be settled through violence. The government alleged that Alexandre Tchama Yala was behind the attack, while also asserting that the Tchama Yala and some of the participants in the attack were linked to Bubo Na Tchuto, who was arrested in The Gambia in August but was later released.

On 3 December Senegal said that it had arrested Alexandre Tchama Yala. The government of Guinea-Bissau stated on 6 December that he had been arrested in the Gambia and that Alfredo Malu, a former deputy Director of Intelligence who was thought to be an associate of PRS President Kumba Yala, had been arrested. The government also announced on 6 December that all public demonstrations were banned for the time being due to insecurity. Alfredu Malu was quickly released due to lack of evidence.

At a meeting of the PAIGC Central Committee on 6 December, PAIGC Second Vice-president Raimundo Pereira was elected as the party's candidate for the post of President of the National People's Assembly, defeating Francisco Benante, who held the post during the previous parliamentary term, and Hélder Proença. Benante criticized the outcome, arguing that the voting method used by the Central Committee was illegal, while Proença vowed to stand as a candidate when the vote was held in the National People's Assembly, despite the party's decision.

The Supreme Court rejected requests for the annulment of results in some constituencies on 17 December. Following the Supreme Court's decision, Yala accepted PAIGC's victory at a press conference on 18 December saying that the PRS would act as a constructive opposition.

On 22 December the newly elected deputies were sworn in and Raimundo Pereira was elected as President of the National People's Assembly. He received 60 votes, while Proença received 37. In accordance with the results of the election, Vieira appointed PAIGC President Carlos Gomes Junior as Prime Minister on 25 December. Gomes said on this occasion that his government would focus on "good governance and a reform of the justice system" and that he and Vieira would "put aside any personal differences" in order to work towards solving the country's problems.

The government headed by Gomes was appointed on 7 January 2009, with 21 ministers and 10 secretaries of state; all of the government's 31 members were members of PAIGC. Only four members of the previous government under Correia were retained.
