= 2014 Guinea-Bissau general election =

- Presidential election
- 13 April 2014 (first round); 18 May 2014 (second round)
- Registered: 775,508
- Turnout: 89.29% (first round); 78.21% (second round)
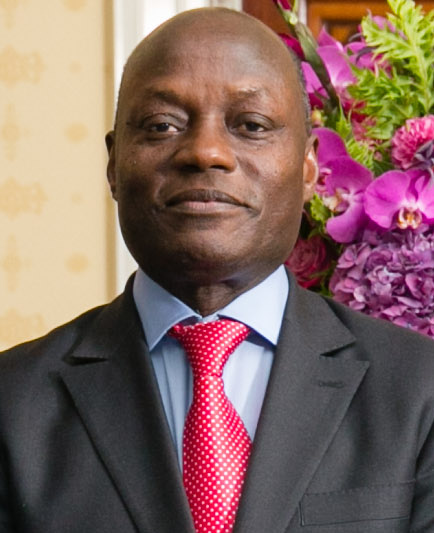

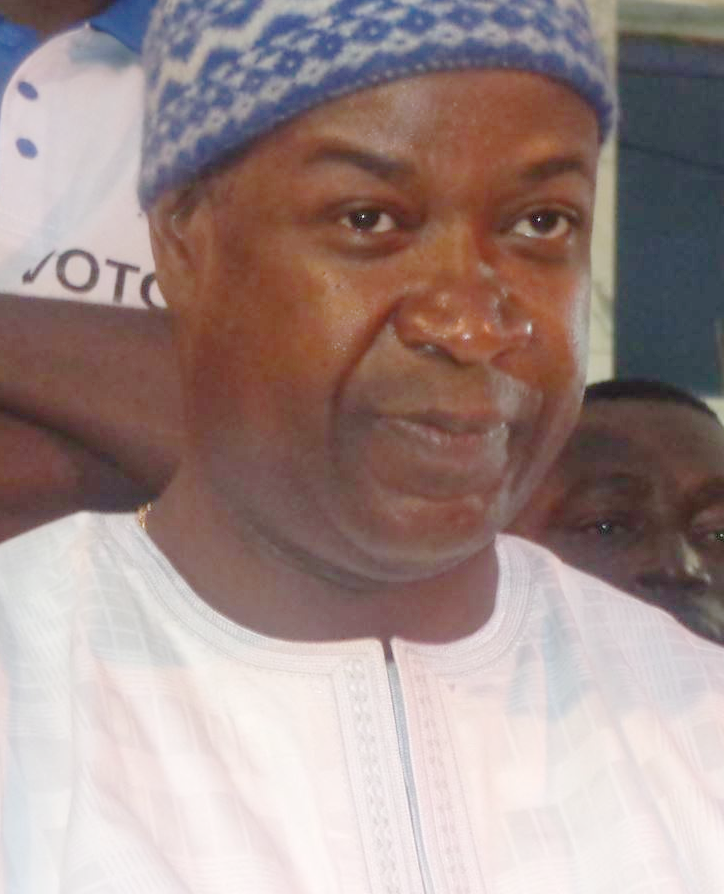
Nominee	José Mário Vaz	Nuno Gomes Nabiam
Party	PAIGC	Independent
Popular vote	364,394	224,089
Percentage	61.92%	38.08%
President before election
Manuel Serifo Nhamadjo (acting)
Independent
Elected President
José Mário Vaz
PAIGC
- Parliamentary election
- 13 April 2014
- All 102 seats in the National People's Assembly; 52 seats needed for a majority
- Turnout: 88.57% (▲6.57pp)
Party	Leader	Vote %	Seats	+/–
PAIGC	Malam Bacai Sanhá	47.98	57	−10
PRS	Abel Incanda	30.76	41	+13
PND	Mamadú Iaia Djaló	4.87	1	0
PCD	Victor Mandinga	3.37	2	+1
UM	Bubacar Rachid Djaló	1.84	1	+1
This lists parties that won seats. See the complete results below.
Results by constituency.
Prime Minister before	Prime Minister after
Rui Duarte de Barros; Independent (acting)	Domingos Simões Pereira; PAIGC

General elections were held in Guinea-Bissau on 13 April 2014, with a second round for the presidential elections held on 18 May since no candidate received a majority in the first round. Several logistic problems and delays caused the elections to be repeatedly postponed, having initially been scheduled for 24 November 2013 and then 16 March 2014. In the second round, José Mário Vaz of the African Party for the Independence of Guinea and Cape Verde was declared the president-elect with 62% of the vote.

== Background ==
The elections were the result of a military coup in 2012 cancelling the elections that year. On 26 February 2014, the UN Security Council urged Guinea-Bissau's transitional government to abide by announced election plans, warning of sanctions against those opposing a return to constitutional order.

Former President Kumba Ialá died a few weeks before the elections.

== Electoral system ==
The President were elected using the two-round system, whilst the 102 members of the National People's Assembly were elected using proportional representation from 27 multi-member constituencies. Article 33 of Guinea-Bissau's Electoral Law prohibits the publishing of any opinion polls.

== Candidates and parties ==
Thirteen presidential candidates were confirmed by the High Court of Justice, whilst eight candidates were rejected.

The Court approved fifteen parties to contest the National People's Assembly election, but rejected applications from seven other parties; the National African Congress, the Guinean Civic Forum-Social Democracy, the Democratic Party for Development, the Guinean Democratic Movement, the Patriotic Movement, the Guinean League for Ecological Protection and the Party for Democracy, Development and Citizenship.

== Results ==
=== President ===
Candidate	Party	First round		Second round	
Candidate	Party	Votes	%	Votes	%
José Mário Vaz	African Party for the Independence of Guinea and Cape Verde	257,572	40.89	364,394	61.92
Nuno Gomes Nabiam	Independent	156,163	24.79	224,089	38.08
Paulo Gomes	Independent	65,490	10.40		
Abel Incanda	Party for Social Renewal	43,890	6.97		
Mamadú Iaia Djaló	New Democracy Party	28,535	4.53		
Ibraima Sory Djaló	National Reconciliation Party	19,497	3.10		
Antonio Afonso Té	Republican Party for Independence and Development	18,808	2.99		
Helder Vaz Lopes	Independent	8,888	1.41		
Domingos Quadé	Independent	8,607	1.37		
Aregado Mantenque Té	Workers' Party	7,269	1.15		
Luis Nancassa	Independent	7,012	1.11		
Jorge Malú	Independent	6,125	0.97		
Cirilo Rodrigues de Oliveira	Socialist Party	2,070	0.33		
Total		629,926	100.00	588,483	100.00
Valid votes		629,926	90.97	588,483	97.02
Invalid/blank votes		62,514	9.03	18,053	2.98
Total votes		692,440	100.00	606,536	100.00
Registered voters/turnout		775,508	89.29	775,508	78.21
Source: CNE, CNE

=== National People's Assembly ===
Party	Votes	%	Seats	+/–
African Party for the Independence of Guinea and Cape Verde	281,408	47.98	57	–10
Party for Social Renewal	180,432	30.76	41	+13
New Democracy Party	28,581	4.87	1	0
Democratic Convergence Party	19,757	3.37	2	+1
Republican Party for Independence and Development	17,919	3.06	0	–3
Union for Change	10,803	1.84	1	+1
Guinean Patriotic Union	10,919	1.86	0	0
Resistance of Guinea-Bissau-Bafatá Movement	9,502	1.62	0	New
National Reconciliation Party	7,903	1.35	0	0
Manifest Party of the People	4,101	0.70	0	New
United Social Democratic Party	4,048	0.69	0	0
Workers' Party	3,659	0.62	0	0
Socialist Part	3,480	0.59	0	0
Social Democratic Party	2,302	0.39	0	0
Democratic Social Front	1,710	0.29	0	0
Total	586,524	100.00	102	+2
Valid votes	586,524	85.39		
Invalid/blank votes	100,352	14.61		
Total votes	686,876	100.00		
Registered voters/turnout	775,508	88.57		
Source: CNE (seats), CNE (votes)
