= Aristides Gomes =

Prime Minister of Guinea-Bissau (2005–2007; 2018–2019; 2019–2020)

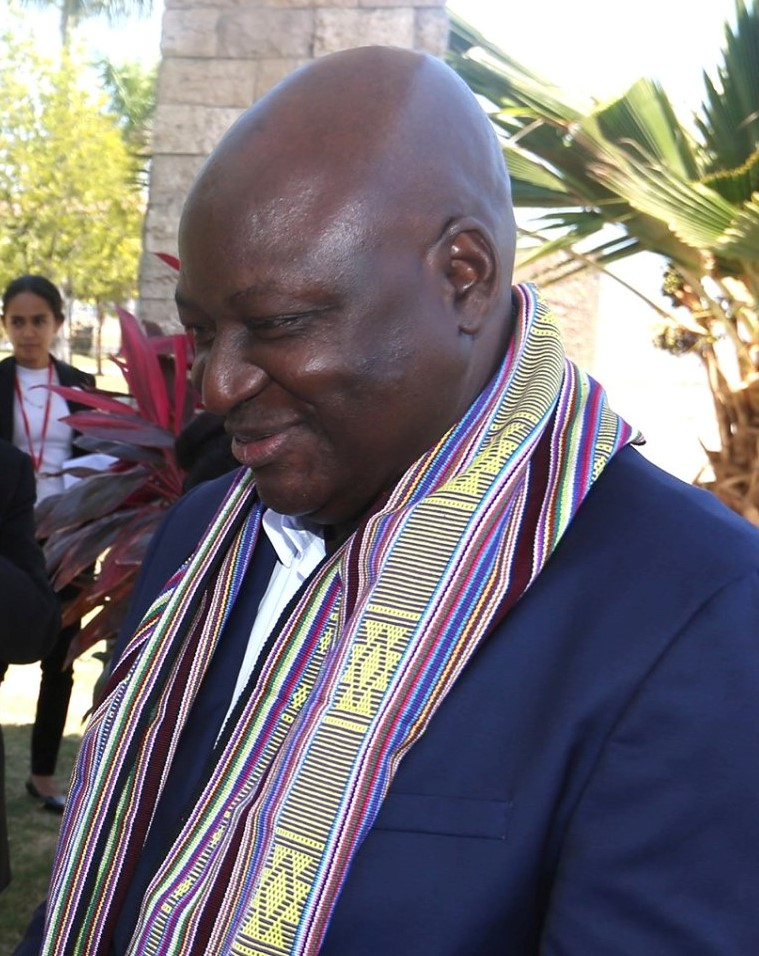

Prime Minister of Guinea-Bissau
- In office 8 November 2019 – 28 February 2020
- President: José Mário Vaz
- Preceded by: Faustino Imbali
- Succeeded by: Nuno Gomes Nabiam
- In office 16 April 2018 – 29 October 2019
- President: José Mário Vaz
- Preceded by: Artur Silva
- Succeeded by: Faustino Imbali
- In office 2 November 2005 – 13 April 2007
- President: João Bernardo Vieira
- Preceded by: Carlos Gomes Júnior
- Succeeded by: Martinho Ndafa Kabi

Personal details
- Born: 8 November 1954 (age 71)
- Party: PRID
- Other political affiliations: PAIGC (until 2008)

Aristides Gomes (born 8 November 1954) is a Bissau-Guinean politician who was the Prime Minister of Guinea-Bissau from 8 November 2019 until 28 February 2020. He previously served as Prime Minister from April 2018 to October 2019, and again from 2 November 2005 to 13 April 2007. He has subsequently served as President of the Republican Party for Independence and Development (PRID).

== Life and career ==
Born in 1954 in Canchungo, Cacheu Region, Gomes attended the University of Paris VIII, where he received a degree in sociology and political science.

A former director-general at Televisão Experimental da Guiné-Bissau (1990–1992), Gomes served as the Minister of Planning and International Cooperation in a past government of President João Bernardo Vieira.

He was a long-time member of the African Party for the Independence of Guinea and Cape Verde (PAIGC), which he joined on 18 December 1973. He was a delegate to the party's Second Extraordinary Congress in January 1991, and at its Sixth Ordinary Congress in May 1998 he was elected to the party's Political Bureau. At PAIGC's Fourth Extraordinary Congress, held in January–February 2002, he was elected as the First Vice-President of the party.

In the March 2004 parliamentary election, Gomes was elected to the National People's Assembly. He was then a candidate for the post of President of the National People's Assembly, but was defeated by Francisco Benante in a vote held by the PAIGC Central Committee in April 2004; he received 71 votes against 106 votes for Benante. Subsequently he was appointed to the government of PAIGC Prime Minister Carlos Gomes Júnior as Minister of Territorial Administration, Administrative Reform, the Civil Service, and Labor on May 11, 2004, but he refused to accept the appointment due to what he described as continued military influence over the government. Later, Gomes was one of the PAIGC leaders on hand to greet Vieira when he returned to Guinea-Bissau from exile on April 7, 2005, and on May 8, 2005 he was suspended from the party (along with 36 other leading members) for openly supporting Vieira's candidacy against the PAIGC's Malam Bacai Sanhá in the presidential election that took place in June and July 2005. Soon after Vieira's election, Gomes defected from the party, and following Vieira's dismissal of Prime Minister Gomes Júnior on 28 October 2005, he named Gomes as Prime Minister on 2 November. The PAIGC appealed this appointment to the country's Supreme Court, which ruled on 26 January 2006 that Vieira was not required to appoint a PAIGC member as prime minister, validating his appointment of Gomes. The PAIGC denounced the ruling, however.

On 12 March 2007, the PAIGC, Party of Social Renewal (PRS), and United Social Democratic Party agreed to form a new government together. Vieira appeared unwilling to dissolve Gomes' government, however; the director of the cabinet said that there was "no valid reason" to do so, and Vieira's allies rejected the pact between the parties, saying that they would try to have it legally annulled. On 19 March, parliament passed a motion of no confidence against Gomes' government, with 54 votes in favor of the motion and 28 against it; eight deputies abstained, and ten were not present. Although the three parties together held a total of 97 out of 100 seats, some of their deputies supported Gomes. Gomes announced on 29 March that he had presented his resignation to Vieira and said that he was still awaiting a response from Vieira. He said that he would be willing to continue as Prime Minister if he had Vieira's confidence, and he blamed the PRS for his difficult situation. On 9 April, Vieira appointed the three-party coalition's proposed candidate, Martinho Ndafa Kabi of the PAIGC, as the new prime minister, and Kabi took office on 13 April.

After leaving office, Gomes faced a legal issue regarding 734 kilograms of drugs that disappeared while he was Prime Minister. According to Gomes, he had ordered the drugs to be stored by the Treasury for safekeeping.

A political party founded by Gomes, the Republican Party of Independence and Development (PRID), opened its constitutive congress on March 7, 2008. Gomes is the President of PRID, which supported Vieira and participated in the November 2008 parliamentary election. PRID won three out of 100 seats in that election, while PAIGC won a majority of seats; Gomes himself won a seat in the National People's Assembly as a PRID candidate in the Cantchungo e Caio constituency, and he accepted the results.

Following Vieira's assassination on March 2, 2009, Gomes left Guinea-Bissau. He filed to run as the PRID candidate in the June 2009 presidential election, but on May 14, 2009, the Supreme Court announced his candidacy had been rejected on the grounds that he had been out of the country during the 90 days before he filed his candidacy.
