= United Social Democratic Party (Guinea-Bissau) =

Political party in Guinea-Bissau

United Social Democratic Party Partido Unido Social Democrático
- Leader: Francisco Fadul
- Founded: 1992
- Split from: PAIGC
- Headquarters: Bissau
- Ideology: Social democracy
- Political position: Centre-left
- Seats in the National People's Assembly: 0 / 100

The United Social Democratic Party (Portuguese: Partido Unido Social Democrático, PUSD) is a centre-left social democratic political party in Guinea-Bissau.

== History ==
The party was established on 30 May 1991 and legalised on 6 June 1992. Victor Saúde Maria was its initial leader. In the 1994 general elections Saúde Maria finished seventh in the presidential elections with 2% of the vote, and the party failed to win a seat in the National People's Assembly. Saúde Maria died on 25 October 1999, and a subsequent leadership crisis prevented it from contesting the 1999 general elections.

Former prime minister Francisco Fadul was elected as the president of the PUSD on 18 December 2002 at a party convention in Bissau. In the 2004 parliamentary elections the party received 17.6% of the vote and won 17 out of 100 seats in the Assembly. However, eight of the PUSD's MPs were expelled from the party in August 2004. In the 2005 presidential elections Fadul finished fourth with 2.85% of the vote.

In 2006 Fadul requested that Namuano Dias, a member of PUDS who was serving in the government as Minister of Justice, resign from the government because he had been accused of corruption. However, Dias and Prime Minister Aristides Gomes rejected the request, resulting in Fadul resigning from the PUSD leadership and leaving politics. He returned to politics in the next year, establishing a new party, the Party for Democracy, Development and Citizenship (PADEC), in May 2007.

On 12 March 2007 the PUSD formed a three-party coalition with the African Party for the Independence of Guinea and Cape Verde (PAIGC) and the Party for Social Renewal (PRS) as they sought to form a new government. This led to a successful no-confidence vote against Prime Minister Aristides Gomes and his resignation late in the month; on 9 April, the choice of the three parties for the position of prime minister, Martinho Ndafa Kabi, was appointed prime minister by President João Bernardo Vieira, and on 17 April a new government was named, with the PUSD receiving two of the 20 ministerial portfolios.

Fadul challenged the leadership of the PUSD in court and maintained that he was the party's legitimate president. According to Fadul, the PUSD had a disputed leadership and therefore could not legitimately participate in the pact.

The 2008 parliamentary elections saw the party lose all its seats in the Assembly. It did not contest the 2009 or 2012 presidential elections. In the 2014 general elections, it did not present a presidential candidate, but did contest the parliamentary elections, receiving 0.7% of the vote and failing to win a seat.

In October 2013 Carmelita Pires was elected leader of the United Social Democratic Party (PUSD) by 264 votes out of the 274. Pires said that she did not intend to run for President of the country. The party had no representation in parliament at that time but it had 17 deputies at the National People's Assembly. Her party's priorities, if elected, would be Education, Health and Social Security.
