= Madem G15 =

Political party in Guinea-Bissau

Movement for Democratic Alternation Movimento para Alternância Democrâtica
- President: Braima Camará
- Founded: 2018
- Split from: PAIGC
- Ideology: Social democracy Left-wing populism Anti-corruption
- Political position: Centre-left
- Colors: Green
- Seats in the National People's Assembly: 29 / 102

Madem-G15, officially the Movement for Democratic Alternation, Group of 15 (Portuguese: Movimento para Alternância Democrática, Grupo dos 15), is a political party in Guinea-Bissau founded by former members of PAIGC in 2018, named for the 15 members who left the PAIGC. Notably, it won 27, the second most seats, of 102 seats in the 2019 legislative election of Guinea-Bissau in its first election showing. On 28 February 2020, Umaro Sissoco Embalo, a member of Madem-G15, took office as President of Guinea-Bissau in a contested election. The party supports former President José Mário Vaz in his dispute with reformist Domingos Simões Pereira.

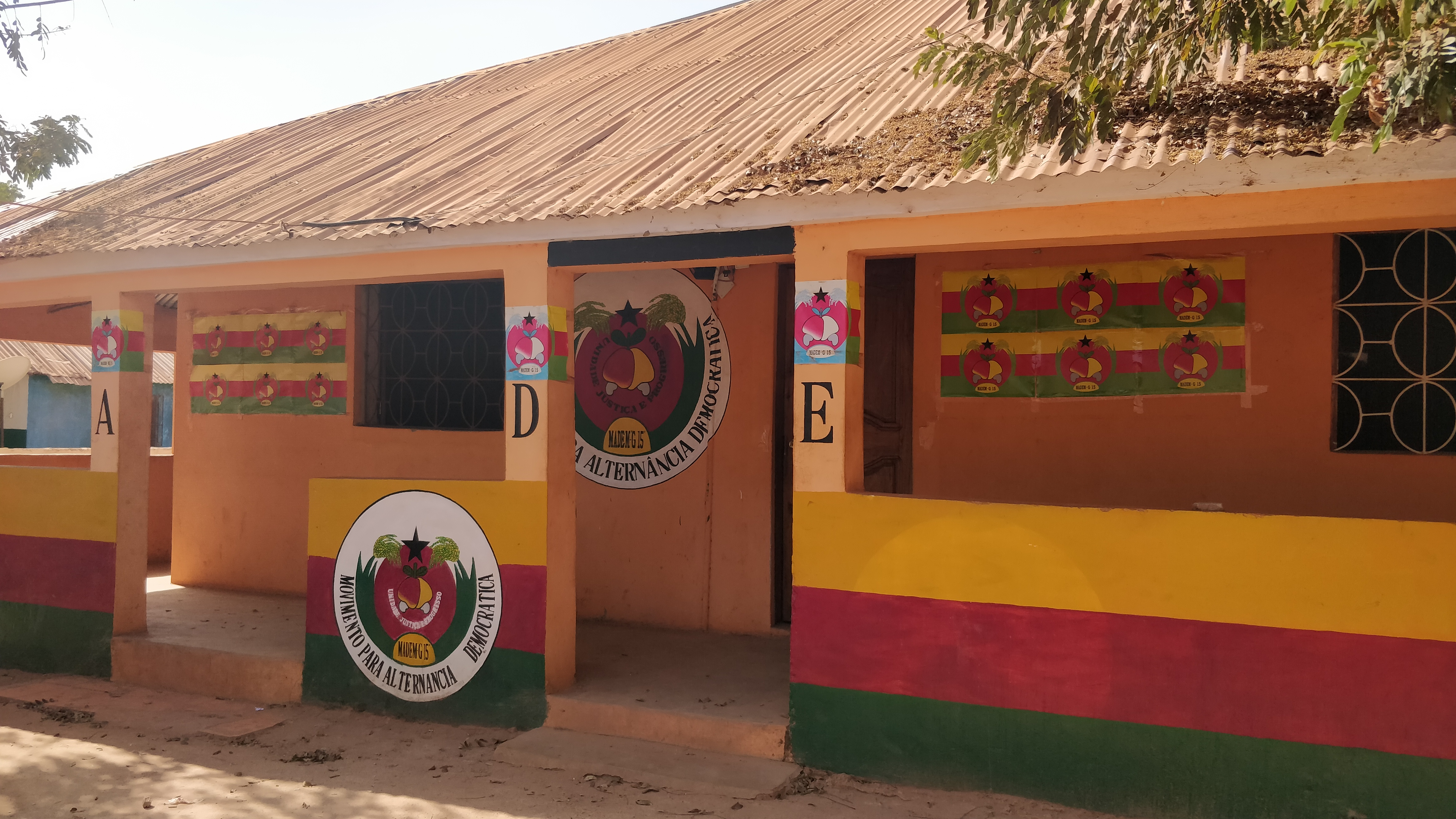
MADEM-G15 party office in Bafatá, Guinea-Bissau

== Election results ==
=== National People's Assembly ===
Election	Votes	%	Seats	+/–	Position	Government
2019	126,935	21.07%	27 / 102	New	▲3rd	Opposition (2019–2020)
2019	126,935	21.07%	27 / 102	New	▲3rd	Coalition (2020–2023)
2023	163,509	24.39%	29 / 102	▲2	▲2nd	Opposition (2023–2025)
2023	163,509	24.39%	29 / 102	▲2	▲2nd	Minority (2025)
2025	TBA	TBA	TBA	TBA	TBA	Annulled
