= 1994 Guinea-Bissau general election =

- Presidential election
- 3 July 1994 (first round); 7 August 1994 (second round)
- Registered: 400,417
- Turnout: 89.33% (first round); 81.57% (second round)
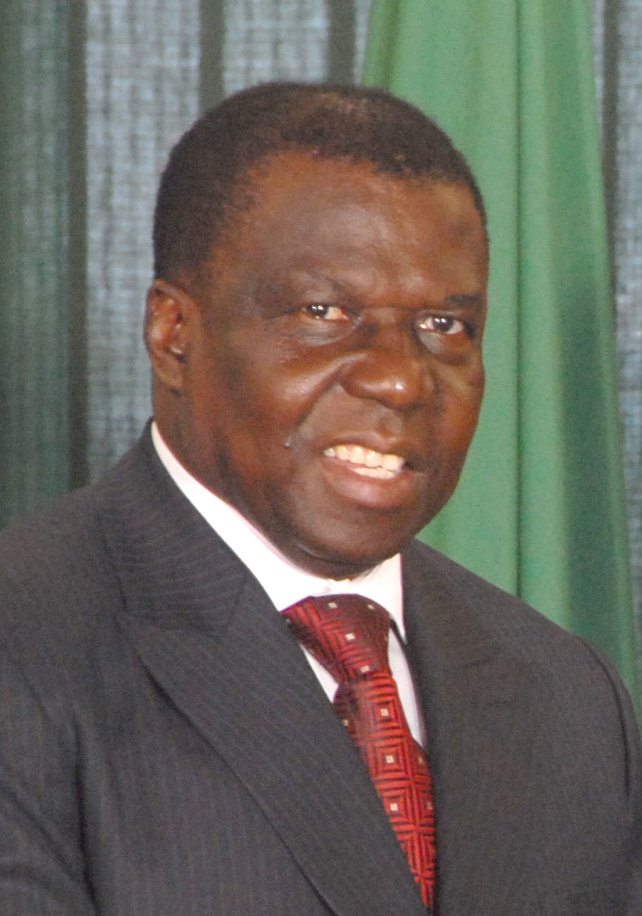

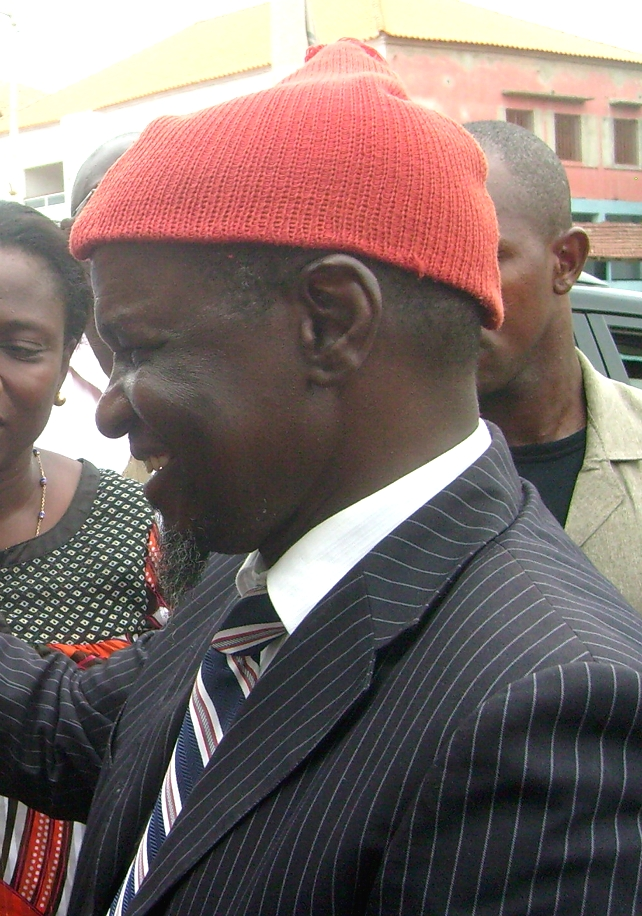
| Nominee | João Bernardo Vieira | Kumba Ialá |
| Party | PAIGC | PRS |
| Popular vote | 161,083 | 148,664 |
| Percentage | 52.02% | 47.98% |
President before election
João Bernardo Vieira
PAIGC
Elected President
João Bernardo Vieira
PAIGC
- Parliamentary election
- 3 July 1994
- All 100 seats in the National People's Assembly; 51 seats needed for a majority
- Turnout: 88.91%
| Party | Leader | Vote % | Seats | +/– |
|---|---|---|---|---|
| PAIGC | Malam Bacai Sanhá | 46.39 | 62 | −88 |
| RGB-BM | Domingos Fernandes | 19.78 | 19 | New |
| UM | Bubacar Rachid Djaló | 12.65 | 6 | New |
| PRS | Kumba Ialá | 10.30 | 12 | New |
| FLING | François Mendy | 2.57 | 1 | New |
This lists parties that won seats. See the complete results below.
Results by constituency.
| Prime Minister before | Prime Minister after |
|---|---|
| Carlos Correia; PAIGC | Manuel Saturnino da Costa; PAIGC |

General elections were held in Guinea-Bissau on 3 July 1994, with a second round for the presidential election on 7 August. They were the first multi-party elections since independence, and also the first time the president had been directly elected, as previously the post had been elected by the National People's Assembly. In the presidential election, the result was a victory for incumbent João Bernardo Vieira of the African Party for the Independence of Guinea and Cape Verde (PAIGC), who defeated Kumba Ialá of Social Renewal Party in the second round. In the Assembly election, 1,136 candidates ran for the 100 seats, of which the PAIGC won 62.

Voter turnout in the presidential election was 89.3% on 3 July and 81.6% on 7 August. In the parliamentary election it was 88.9%.

== Results ==
=== President ===
Independent candidate Carlos Gomes was supported by the Democratic Convergence Party, as its leader Victor Mandinga was not eligible to run for president, as he failed to meet the qualification that both parents be Guineans born in the country.

| Candidate | Party | First round | | Second round | |
| Candidate | Party | Votes | % | Votes | % |
|---|---|---|---|---|---|
| João Bernardo Vieira | African Party for the Independence of Guinea and Cape Verde | 142,577 | 46.20 | 161,083 | 52.00 |
| Kumba Ialá | Party for Social Renewal | 67,518 | 21.88 | 148,664 | 48.00 |
| Domingos Fernandes | Resistance of Guinea-Bissau-Bafatá Movement | 53,825 | 17.44 | | |
| Carlos Gomes | Independent | 15,645 | 5.07 | | |
| François Mendy | Struggle Front for the National Independence of Guinea | 8,655 | 2.80 | | |
| Bubacar Rachid Djaló | Union for Change | 8,506 | 2.76 | | |
| Victor Saúde Maria | United Social Democratic Party | 6,388 | 2.07 | | |
| Antonieta Rosa Gomes | Guinean Civic Forum–Social Democracy | 5,509 | 1.79 | | |
| Total | | 308,623 | 100.00 | 309,747 | 100.00 |
| Valid votes | | 308,623 | 86.28 | 309,747 | 94.84 |
| Invalid/blank votes | | 49,059 | 13.72 | 16,868 | 5.16 |
| Total votes | | 357,682 | 100.00 | 326,615 | 100.00 |
| Registered voters/turnout | | 400,417 | 89.33 | 400,417 | 81.57 |
Source: CNE

=== National People's Assembly ===
| Party | Votes | % | Seats |
|---|---|---|---|
| African Party for the Independence of Guinea and Cape Verde | 134,982 | 46.39 | 62 |
| Resistance of Guinea-Bissau-Bafatá Movement | 57,566 | 19.78 | 19 |
| Union for Change | 36,797 | 12.65 | 6 |
| Party for Social Renewal | 29,957 | 10.30 | 12 |
| Democratic Convergence Party | 15,411 | 5.30 | 0 |
| United Social Democratic Party | 8,286 | 2.85 | 0 |
| Struggle Front for the National Independence of Guinea | 7,475 | 2.57 | 1 |
| Guinean Civic Forum | 494 | 0.17 | 0 |
| Total | 290,968 | 100.00 | 100 |
| Valid votes | 290,968 | 81.73 | |
| Invalid/blank votes | 65,024 | 18.27 | |
| Total votes | 355,992 | 100.00 | |
| Registered voters/turnout | 400,417 | 88.91 | |
Source: CNE
