= Mamadú Iaia Djaló =

Guinea-Bissauan politician (c.1962–2021)

Mamadu Iaia Djaló

Minister of Commerce and Industry
- In office 2019–2021

Minister of Justice and Human Rights
- In office 2018–2019
- Preceded by: Rui Sanha
- Succeeded by: Ruth Monteiro

Personal details
- Born: c. 1962 Guinea, Portugal
- Died: 20 December 2021 Dakar, Senegal

Mamadu Iaia Djaló (c. 1962 – 20 December 2021) was a Guinea-Bissau politician, and the founder and leader of the New Democracy Party.

== Political career ==
Running as an independent presidential candidate in the 2005 presidential election, Djaló finished sixth out of thirteen presidential candidates, receiving 1.59% of the vote. In 2007, he founded the New Democracy Party, and contested the 2009 presidential elections, in which he finished fourth out of eleven candidates, with 3.11% of the vote. He did not contest the 2012 presidential elections, but in 2014 general elections he finished fifth out of thirteen with 4.56% of the vote and his party won one seat in parliament.

In April 2018 he was appointed Minister of Justice and Human Rights. In a cabinet reshuffle in July 2019, he was appointed Minister of Commerce and Industry.

He contested the 2019 presidential elections, finishing eighth out of twelve candidates with 0.5% of the vote.

== Personal life and death ==
After falling ill in Lomé, Togo, Djaló was transferred to Dakar, Senegal, where he died on 20 December 2021.
