= Party for Social Renewal =

Political party in Guinea-Bissau

Social Renewal Party Partido da Renovaçao Social
- Abbreviation: PRS
- President: Fernando Dias
- General Secretary: Florentino Mendes Pereira
- Founder: Kumba Ialá
- Founded: 14 January 1992
- Split from: PAIGC
- Headquarters: Bissau, Guinea-Bissau
- Ideology: Liberalism; Social liberalism Reformism; Agrarianism; Progressivism
- Political position: Centre to centre-right
- International affiliation: Centrist Democrat International
- Colors: Red-white-blue tricolour (flag); Orange (customary)
- Slogan: "Liberty – Transparency – Justice" (Portuguese: "Liberdade – Transparência – Justiça")
- National People's Assembly: 12 / 102

Party flag

Website
- prsgw.webnode.pt

The Social Renewal Party (Portuguese: Partido da Renovação Social, PRS) is a political party in Guinea-Bissau. It is one of the country's leading parties.

== History ==
=== 1990s ===
Multi-party democracy was introduced to Guinea-Bissau by the ruling African Party for the Independence of Guinea and Cape Verde (PAIGC) in May 1991, and the PRS was established on 14 January 1992 by Kumba Ialá, a former PAIGC member.

Ialá was the party's presidential candidate in the 1994 general elections. He received 22% of the vote in the first round on 3 July, progressing to the run-off. Although the other opposition parties united behind him he lost to incumbent President João Bernardo Vieira by the narrow margin of 52%–48%. In the parliamentary elections the PRS won 10.3% of the vote and won 12 seats, emerging as the third-largest party in the National People's Assembly.

After Vieira was deposed on 7 May 1999, the transition government under Malam Bacai Sanhá arranged new elections. Ialá ran as the PRS candidate for president for a second time, emerging as the leading candidate in the first round. In the second round he defeated Sanhá by 72%–28%, becoming the country's first non-PAIGC president. The PRS also emerged as the largest party in the National People's Assembly, winning 38 of the 102 seats, whilst the PAIGC was also beaten by the Resistance of Guinea-Bissau-Bafatá Movement. The PRS nominated Caetano N'Tchama as Prime Minister in January 2000.

=== 2000s ===
Ialá resigned as president of the PRS in May 2000, although he continued to play an influential role in the party. Prime Minister Alamara Nhassé was elected as party leader in January 2002 at a PRS convention. However, following his dismissal as prime minister later in the year, he resigned as party leader and was replaced by Alberto Nan Beia.

The PRS's time in power was characterized by a poor economic situation and political instability. Ialá, alleged by critics to be erratic and to have autocratic tendencies, dissolved parliament in November 2002, but early elections intended to be held in February 2003 were delayed several times, until Ialá was ousted in a coup led by Veríssimo Correia Seabra on 14 September 2003. Seabra's military government chose the PRS's general secretary Artur Sanhá to become prime minister of a transitional government, with Henrique Rosa as president; they were sworn in on 28 September. Sanhá took office despite the opposition of 15 of the 17 involved political parties, which said that the prime minister should be an independent.

The 2004 parliamentary elections were won by the PAIGC, which won 45 of the 100 seats; the PRS emerged as the second strongest party in the National People's Assembly with 35 seats. The PRS agreed to support PAIGC in parliament in return for a number of important positions, although it did not get any ministers in the government. Ialá was released from house arrest shortly before the elections, and in March 2005 he was nominated by the PRS as its candidate in the presidential elections that year. However, he finished in third place in the first round, failing to qualify for the run-off, contested by Sanhá and Vieira. Ialá and the PRS protested against the outcome of the first round, claiming to have actually received the most votes, but Ialá later accepted the outcome, while still claiming to have received the most votes, and endorsed Vieira for the second round. After Vieira's assumption of office on 1 October 2005, a crisis within the PAIGC led to several splits that resulted in the PRS becoming the largest party in parliament.

On 12 November 2006, Ialá was re-elected head of the PRS at the party's third congress, with about 70% of the vote; the previous leader, Nan Beia, received 20%. His victory was, however, disputed by his opponents within the party.

In March 2007, the PRS formed a three-party alliance with the PAIGC and the United Social Democratic Party, as the three parties sought to form a new government. This led to a successful no-confidence vote against Prime Minister Aristides Gomes and his resignation later in the month; on 9 April, the three parties nominated Martinho Ndafa Kabi of the PAIGC for prime minister, with President Vieira appointing him to the post. On 17 April a new government was named, composed of ministers from the three parties.

In May 2007, following an appeal for the annulment of the third ordinary congress by a faction of the PRS opposed to Ialá, the Regional Court of Bissau cancelled the congress's resolutions and removed Ialá from the party leadership. However, on 23 August 2007 the Supreme Court of Guinea-Bissau reversed this decision and restored Ialá to the party leadership.

Members of the PRS were included in the government headed by Carlos Correia, which was appointed on 9 August 2008. The government was dominated by Vieira loyalists and members of PAIGC, but the PRS was given five of the 28 cabinet posts.

The November 2008 parliamentary elections saw the PRS win 28 seats, remaining the second-largest party behind the PAIGC. In the 2009 presidential elections Ialá lost to Malam Bacai Sanhá in the run-off.

=== 2010s ===
Ialá finished in second place in the first round of the 2012 presidential elections, but a run-off between him and Carlos Gomes Júnior of the PAIGC was not held following a military coup. Ialá died shortly before the 2014 elections.

The 2014 elections saw the party nominate Abel Incanda as its presidential candidate, but he finished fourth in the first round with 7% of the vote. However, the PRS won 41 of the 102 seats in the National People's Assembly, remaining the second-largest party after the PAIGC.

== Electoral history ==
=== National People's Assembly ===
Election	Votes	%	Seats	+/–	Position	Government
1994	29,957	10.30%	12 / 100	New	▲4th	Opposition
1999	105,736	29.71%	38 / 102	▲26	▲1st	Coalition
2004	113,656	26.50%	35 / 100	▼3	▼2nd	Coalition
2008	115,755	25.21%	28 / 100	▼7	2nd	Opposition
2014	180,432	30.76%	41 / 102	▲13	2nd	Opposition
2019	127,104	21.10%	21 / 102	▼20	2nd	Opposition (2019–2020)
2019	127,104	21.10%	21 / 102	▼20	2nd	Coalition (2020–2023)
2023	100,429	14.98%	12 / 102	▼9	▼3rd	Opposition
2025	TBA	TBA	TBA	TBA	TBA	Opposition
