= 1999–2000 Guinea-Bissau general election =

- Presidential election
- 28 November 1999 (first round); 16 January 2000 (second round)
- Registered: 503,007
- Turnout: 83.38% (first round); 71.89% (second round)
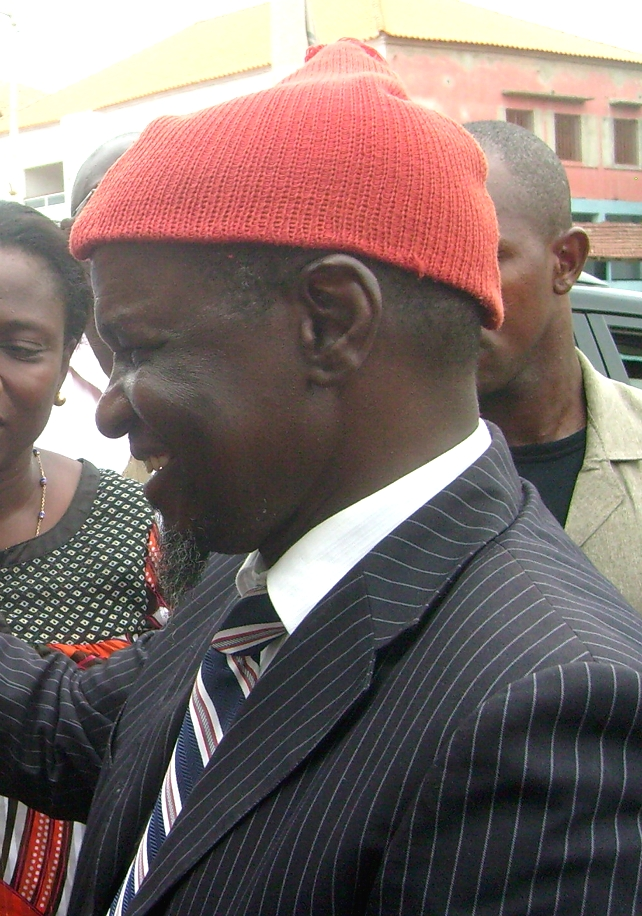

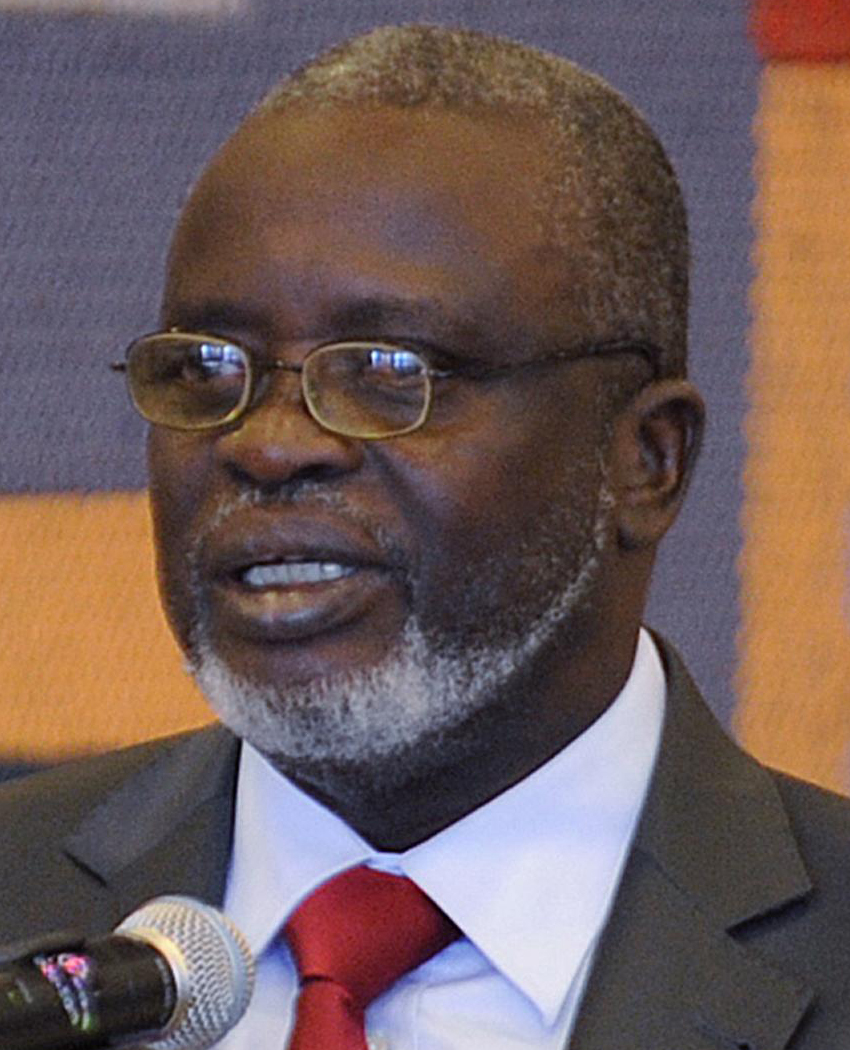
Nominee	Kumba Ialá	Malam Bacai Sanhá
Party	PRS	PAIGC
Popular vote	251,193	97,670
Percentage	72.00%	28.00%
- Results by region of the second round.
President before election
Malam Bacai Sanhá (acting)
PAIGC
Elected President
Kumba Ialá
PRS
- Parliamentary election
- 28 November 1999
- All 102 seats in the National People's Assembly; 52 seats needed for a majority
- Turnout: 82.35% (▼6.56pp)
Party	Leader	Vote %	Seats	+/–
PRS	Kumba Ialá	29.71	38	+26
RGB-BM	Salvador Tchongó	19.79	29	+9
PAIGC	Malam Bacai Sanhá	18.04	24	−38
UM	Bubacar Rachid Djaló	7.86	3	−3
PDS	Joaquim Baldé	5.60	3	New
AD	Jorge Mandinga	4.96	3	New
UNDP	Abubácar Baldé	4.06	1	New
FDS	Rafael Paula Barbosa	2.56	1	New
This lists parties that won seats. See the complete results below.
Seats by constituency.
Prime Minister before	Prime Minister after
Francisco Fadul; Independent	Francisco Fadul; Independent

General elections were held in Guinea-Bissau on 28 November 1999, with a second round for the presidential election on 16 January 2000. The presidential election resulted in a victory for opposition leader Kumba Ialá of the Party for Social Renewal (PRS), who defeated Malam Bacai Sanhá of the ruling African Party for the Independence of Guinea and Cape Verde. The PRS were also victorious in the National People's Assembly election, winning 38 of the 102 seats.

These were the first elections held in Guinea Bissau since the 1998-99 Civil War that deposed the government of João Bernardo Vieira. This was the first time an opposition party won an election since the country's independence in the 1970s.

Voter turnout was 72% for the second round of the presidential election.

== Results ==
=== President ===
Candidate	Party	First round		Second round	
Candidate	Party	Votes	%	Votes	%
Kumba Ialá	Party for Social Renewal	143,996	38.81	251,193	72.00
Malam Bacai Sanhá	African Party for the Independence of Guinea and Cape Verde	86,724	23.37	97,670	28.00
Faustino Imbali	Independent	30,484	8.22		
Fernando Gomes	Independent	26,049	7.02		
João Tátis Sá	Independent	24,117	6.50		
Abubacar Baldé	National Union for Democracy and Progress	20,192	5.44		
Bubacar Rachid Djaló	Union for Change	12,026	3.24		
Joaquim Baldé	Social Democratic Party	8,623	2.32		
Salvador Tchongó	Resistance of Guinea-Bissau-Bafatá Movement	6,937	1.87		
José Catengul Mendes	Struggle Front for the National Independence of Guinea	5,311	1.43		
Mamadú Uri Baldé	Progress and Renewal Party	3,580	0.96		
Antonieta Rosa Gomes	Guinean Civic Forum–Social Democracy	2,986	0.80		
Total		371,025	100.00	348,863	100.00
Valid votes		371,025	88.46	348,863	96.48
Invalid/blank votes		48,387	11.54	12,746	3.52
Total votes		419,412	100.00	361,609	100.00
Registered voters/turnout		503,007	83.38	503,007	71.89
Source: African Elections Database, Rudebeck

=== National People's Assembly ===
Party	Votes	%	Seats	+/–
Party for Social Renewal	105,736	29.71	38	+26
Resistance of Guinea-Bissau-Bafatá Movement	70,435	19.79	29	+9
African Party for the Independence of Guinea and Cape Verde	64,215	18.04	24	–38
Union for Change	27,976	7.86	3	–3
Social Democratic Party	19,919	5.60	3	New
Democratic Alliance	17,651	4.96	3	New
National Union for Democracy and Progress	14,440	4.06	1	New
Guinean League for Ecological Protection	11,496	3.23	0	–
Democratic Social Front	9,094	2.56	1	New
United Social Democratic Party	4,712	1.32	0	0
Party for Renewal and Progress	3,692	1.04	0	New
Struggle Front for the National Independence of Guinea	3,262	0.92	0	–1
Guinean Civic Forum–Social Democracy	3,262	0.92	0	New
Total	355,890	100.00	102	+2
Total votes	432,604	–		
Registered voters/turnout	525,329	82.35		
Source: Rudebeck, IFES Guinee-Bissau Rapport
