= National People's Assembly (Guinea-Bissau) =

Parliament of Guinea-Bissau

Coordinates: 11.8584°N 15.5908°W

National Assembly of Guinea-Bissau Assembleia Nacional da Guiné-Bissau
- 11th Legislature

Type
- Type: Unicameral

History
- Founded: 1973

Leadership
- President: Vacant since 4 December 2023
- Vice-President: Vacant since 4 December 2023
- Second Vice-President: Vacant since 4 December 2023

Structure
- Seats: 65 members
- Political groups: Dissolved legislature
- Length of term: 4 years

Elections
- Voting system: Party-list proportional representation
- First election: 19 December 1976 – January 1977
- Last election: 23 November 2025
- Next election: 6 December 2026

Meeting place
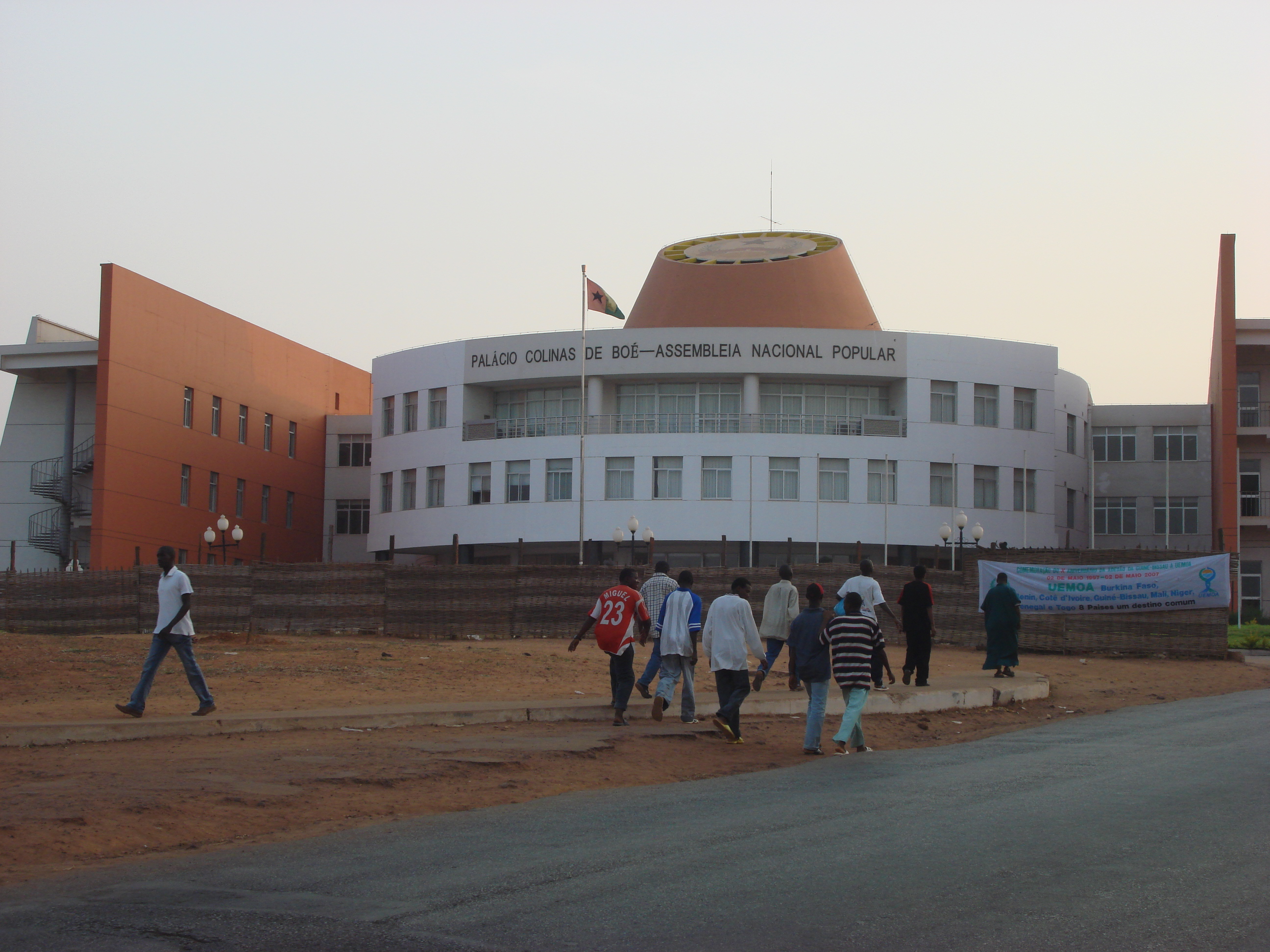
- Palácio Colinas de Boé, Bissau

Website
- www.parlamento.gw

The National People's Assembly (Portuguese: Assembleia Nacional Popular), called National Assembly (Portuguese: Assembleia Nacional) from 2026, is Guinea-Bissau's unicameral legislative body. Since 2026, the Assembly has a total of 65 seats, with 63 members being elected in the nation's 12 constituencies, and 2 additional members represent the diaspora.

== Election results ==
Previous National People's Assembly election results
Political Party	Election Year						
Political Party	1994	1999	2004	2008	2014	2019	2023
African Party for the Independence of Guinea and Cape Verde (PAIGC)	62	24	45	67	57	47	54
Party for Social Renewal (PRS)	12	38	35	28	41	21	12
Resistance of Guinea-Bissau-Bafatá Movement (RGB-MB)	19	29	–	–	–	–	–
Union for Change (UM)	6	3	–	–	–	–	–
Struggle Front for the National Independence of Guinea (FLING)	1	–	–	–	–	–	–
Democratic Alliance (AD)	–	3	–	1	–	–	–
Social Democratic Party (PSD)	–	3	–	–	–	–	–
Democratic Social Front (FDS)	–	1	–	–	–	–	–
National Union for Democracy and Progress (UNDP)	–	1	–	–	–	–	–
United Social Democratic Party (PUSD)	–	–	17	–	–	–	–
Electoral Union (UE)	–	–	2	–	–	–	–
United People's Alliance (APU)	–	–	1	–	–	–	–
Republican Party for Independence and Development (PRID)	–	–	–	3	–	–	–
New Democracy Party (PND)	–	–	–	1	1	1	–
Democratic Convergence Party (PCD)	–	–	–	–	2	–	–
Union for Change (UM)	–	–	–	–	1	1	–
Madem G15	–	–	–	–	–	27	29
Guinean Workers' Party (PTG)	–	–	–	–	–	–	6
Assembly of the People United (APU)	–	–	–	–	–	5	1
Total	100	102	100	100	102	102	102

== See also ==
- History of Guinea-Bissau
- Politics of Guinea-Bissau
- List of presidents of the National People's Assembly of Guinea-Bissau
