= New Democracy Party (Guinea-Bissau) =

Political party in Guinea-Bissau

The New Democracy Party (Portuguese: Partido da Nova Democracia, PND) is a political party in Guinea-Bissau.

== History ==
The party was established by Mamadú Iaia Djaló in 2007. It won a single seat in the National People's Assembly in the 2008 elections. In the 2009 presidential elections it nominated Djaló as its candidate. He finished fourth with 3% of the vote.

In the 2014 elections the party won a single seat in the National People's Assembly, whilst Djaló finished fifth in the presidential election with 5% of the vote.
