= Republican Party for Independence and Development =

Political party in Guinea-Bissau

The Republican Party for Independence and Development (Portuguese: Partido Republicano para a Independência e Desenvolvimento, PRID) is a political party in Guinea-Bissau led by António Afonso Té.

== History ==
The party was established in March 2008 as a breakaway from the PAIGC who supported President João Bernardo Vieira. Led by Aristides Gomes, it finished third in the popular vote in the 2008 parliamentary elections, winning three seats in the National People's Assembly. The party became part of the governing coalition.

The 2014 elections saw PRID lose all three seats, whilst Antonio Afonso Té finished seventh in the presidential elections with 3% of the vote.
