= 2012 Guinea-Bissau presidential election =

- 18 March 2012 (first round); 29 April 2012 (second round)
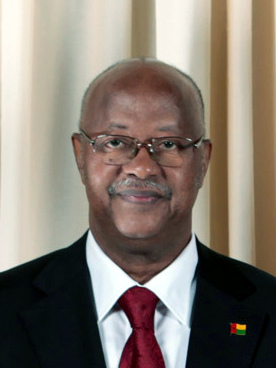

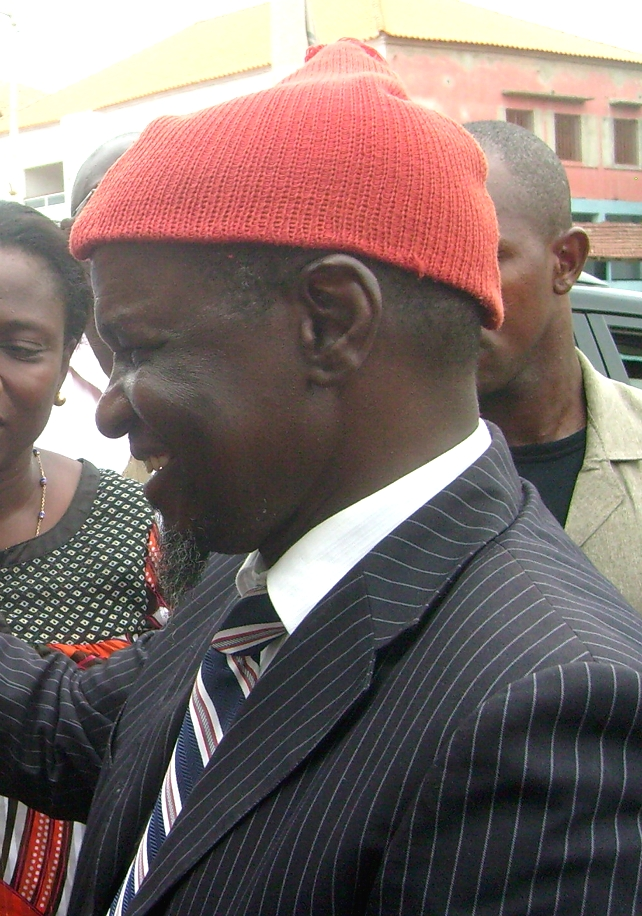

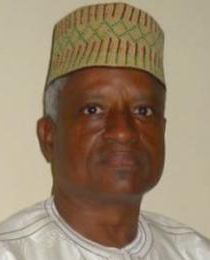

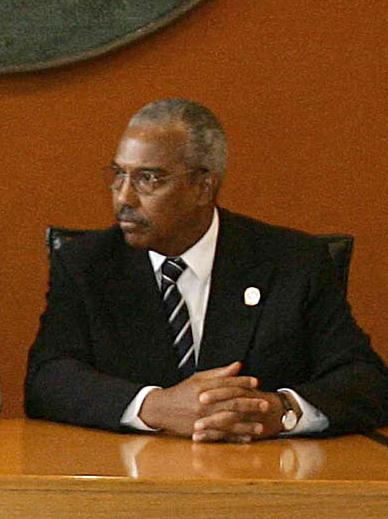
| Nominee | Carlos Gomes Júnior | Kumba Ialá |
| Party | PAIGC | PRS |
| Popular vote | 154,797 | 73,842 |
| Percentage | 48.97% | 23.36% |
| Nominee | Manuel Serifo Nhamadjo | Henrique Rosa |
| Party | Independent | Independent |
| Popular vote | 49,767 | 17,070 |
| Percentage | 15.74% | 5.40% |
- Results by region
President before election
Raimundo Pereira
(Acting)
PAIGC
Chairman of the Military Command
Mamadu Ture Kuruma
(Interim)

Presidential elections were held in Guinea-Bissau on 18 March 2012 following the death of President Malam Bacai Sanhá on 9 January. A run-off was set to be held on 29 April after being postponed by a week as announced by electoral commission chief Desejado Lima Dacosta. However, after a military coup, the leading candidates were arrested and the election was cancelled. The junta's spokesman then announced plans to hold an election in two years, despite condemnation. General elections were subsequently held in April 2014.

== Background ==
Following the death of Malam Bacai Sanhá on 9 January 2012, an early presidential elections were scheduled to be held within 90 days, in accordance with the constitution.

No president in the history of independent Guinea-Bissau has completed his term in office: Three presidents have been ousted, one was assassinated, and another died in office.

== Campaign ==
Prime Minister Carlos Gomes Júnior resigned on 10 February to run for the presidency. A total of nine candidates contested the elections, five of whom ran in the previous elections in 2009. Their campaign literature was said to be "largely recycled." Carlos Gomes Júnior and Kumba Ialá were said to be the frontrunners in the election.

Ialá's support base was primarily based on his Balanta ethnic group. Gomes Júnior had indicated he wanted to reform the armed forces, with which he had a tense relationship.

Campaigning for the second round was due to start on 13 April and end on 27 April.

== Conduct ==
UNIOGBIS spokesman Vladimir Monteiro said: "The election was held in a very peaceful manner. In the morning, participation was relatively weak but, all day long, leaders of the electoral body encouraged the people to go and vote, and it seems that people listened and went to vote because the participation finally increased." He also added that the election commission is mandated by the constitution to release the result within 10 days of the election. However, the same night fears of military-linked violence increased with the assassination of the former head of military intelligence, Colonel Samba Diallo, just before midnight at a bar in the national capital of Bissau. The Guardian reported witnesses as saying that soldiers had fired at him and then taken his body away, possibly to a hospital.

== Results ==
No candidate was able to attain a 50% majority in the first round. The leading two candidates, Carlos Gomes Júnior and Kumba Ialá were set to face each other in a runoff election to be held on 22 April.

Five of the first round candidates complained that the poll had been fraudulent despite independent, international observers stating that it was conducted fairly.

| Candidate | Party | Votes | % |
|---|---|---|---|
| Carlos Gomes Júnior | African Party for the Independence of Guinea and Cape Verde | 154,797 | 48.97 |
| Mohamed Ialá Embaló | Party for Social Renewal | 73,842 | 23.36 |
| Manuel Serifo Nhamadjo | Independent | 49,767 | 15.74 |
| Henrique Pereira Rosa | Independent | 17,070 | 5.40 |
| Baciro Djá | Independent | 10,298 | 3.26 |
| Vicente Fernandes | Democratic Alliance | 4,396 | 1.39 |
| Aregado Mantenque Té | Workers' Party | 3,300 | 1.04 |
| Serifo Baldé | Guinean Salvation Democratic Socialist Party–Young Party | 1,463 | 0.46 |
| Luís Nancassa | Independent | 1,174 | 0.37 |
| Total | | 316,107 | 100.00 |
| Valid votes | | 316,107 | 96.85 |
| Invalid/blank votes | | 10,292 | 3.15 |
| Total votes | | 326,399 | 100.00 |
| Registered voters/turnout | | 593,765 | 54.97 |
Source: African Elections Database

== Aftermath ==
Despite a peaceful campaign, there were fears of possible violence or a coup d'état if the army did not approve of the winner. UN Secretary General Ban Ki-moon called for a "peaceful, orderly and transparent" election. Opposition leaders, led by Ialá, called for a boycott of the second round because they considered the election fraudulent, with Ialá calling for new voter registration to take place and warned against campaigning.

The Director General of the Judicial Police Joao Biague announced that the former head of intelligence, Samba Diallo, was assassinated shortly after the polls closed. On 12 April, elements within the factionalised army staged a coup d'état, leading to the arrest of both second round candidates, amongst others, by the Military Command and calls for a national unity government.
