= 2009 Guinea-Bissau presidential election =

- 28 June 2009 (first round); 26 July 2009 (second round)
- Registered: 593,765
- Turnout: 60.01% (first round); 61.09% (second round)
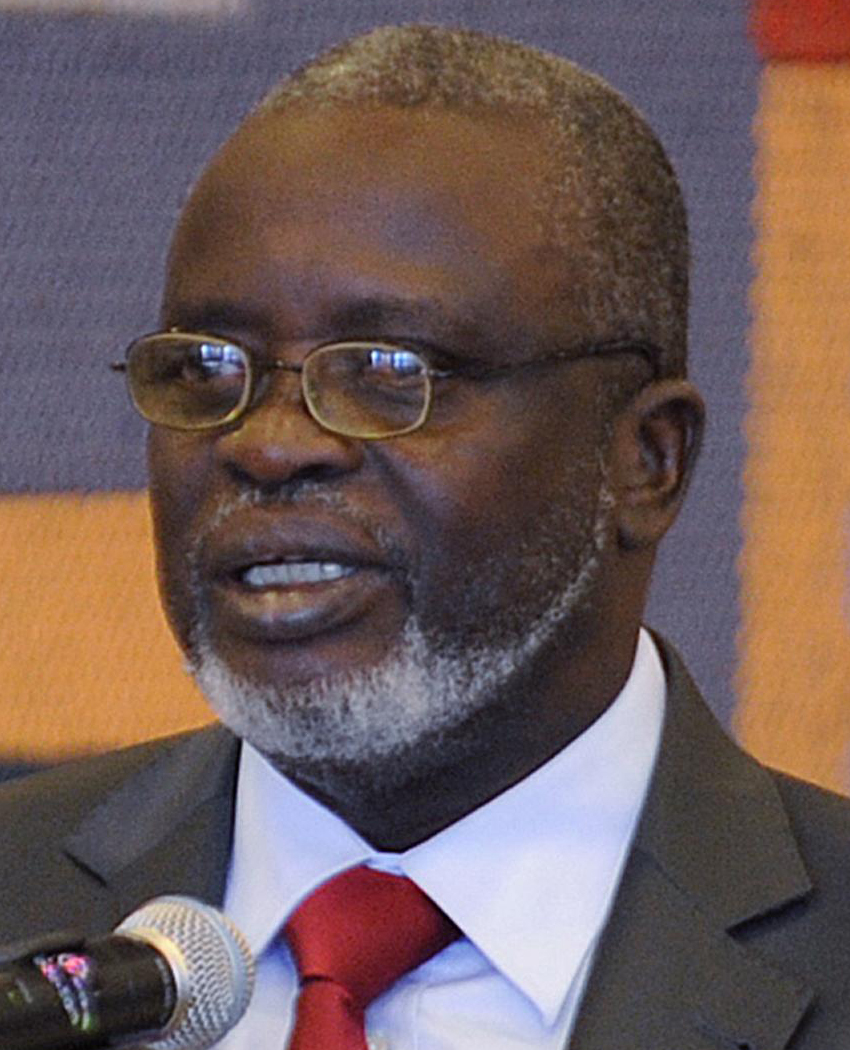

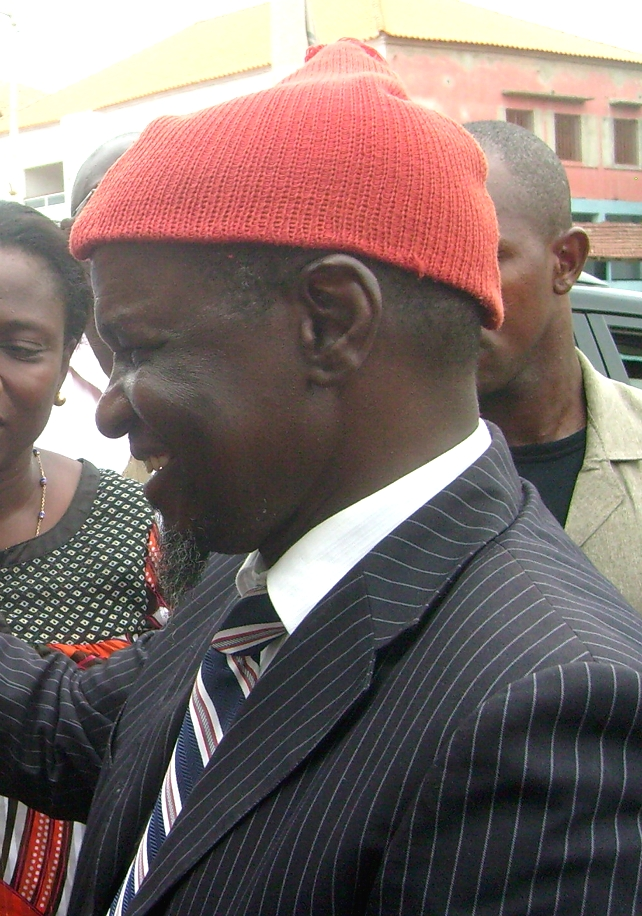
| Nominee | Malam Bacai Sanhá | Kumba Ialá |
| Party | PAIGC | PRS |
| Popular vote | 224,259 | 129,973 |
| Percentage | 63.31% | 36.69% |
President before election
Raimundo Pereira (acting)
PAIGC
Elected President
Malam Bacai Sanhá
PAIGC

Presidential elections were held in Guinea-Bissau on 28 June 2009 following the assassination of President João Bernardo Vieira on 2 March 2009. As no candidate won a majority in the first round, a second round was held on 26 July 2009 between the two leading candidates, Malam Bacai Sanhá of the governing African Party for the Independence of Guinea and Cape Verde (PAIGC) and opposition leader Kumba Ialá. Sanhá won with a substantial majority in the second round, according to official results.

== Background ==
At Vieira's funeral on 10 March 2009, interim President Raimundo Pereira said that meeting the 60-day deadline for holding a new election was "one of our greatest challenges." Cape Verde's Prime Minister, Jose Maria Neves, stated on 27 March 2009 that it was logistically and economically impossible for Guinea-Bissau to hold the election on time, and that it should aim to hold them in June or November (before or after the rain season). Prime Minister Carlos Gomes Junior announced on 31 March that the election would be held on 28 June, with the agreement of "all the parties, the government, the interim president and political classes".

Foreign donors paid the entire cost of the election, about 5.1 million euros.

== Candidates ==
In April 2009, the Social Renewal Party (PRS), Guinea-Bissau's main opposition party, designated its President, Kumba Ialá (who was previously President of Guinea-Bissau from 2000 to 2003), as its candidate for the presidential election. Some in the party who opposed Ialá's "system of monopoly" instead proposed the candidacy of Baltizar Lopes Fernandes, but they were unsuccessful.

Six candidates sought the presidential nomination of the African Party for the Independence of Guinea and Cape Verde (PAIGC), the ruling party. PAIGC President Carlos Gomes Junior backed Pereira. On 25 April 2009, the PAIGC Central Committee chose Malam Bacai Sanhá, who was interim President of Guinea-Bissau from 1999 to 2000, as the party's presidential candidate. He received 144 votes, while Pereira received 118; another unsuccessful candidate for the nomination was former Prime Minister Manuel Saturnino Costa.

Aristides Gomes, who was Prime Minister from 2005 to 2007 and led the Republican Party for Independence and Development (PRID), submitted a candidate application. Francisco Fadul, who was Prime Minister from 1999 to 2000 and is currently the President of the Tribunal of Accounts, also submitted an application to stand as the candidate of his party, the African Party for Development and Citizenship (PADEC). Henrique Rosa, who was Interim President from 2003 to 2005, sought to run as an independent candidate, as did the Minister of Internal Administration, Baciro Dabó. In total, 20 candidates submitted applications to the Supreme Court of Justice, 13 representing political parties and seven independents. Zinha Vaz ran as the candidate of the Guinean Patriotic Union (UPG), and was the only female candidate in the election.

On 14 May, the Supreme Court announced that 12 candidacies had been approved and eight had been rejected. The candidacies of Sanhá, Ialá, and Rosa were among those accepted. Fadul's candidacy was rejected on the grounds that he was still President of the Tribunal of Accounts and a member of the Bar, which the Supreme Court judged to be legally incompatible with his presidential candidacy. The candidacy of Aristides Gomes was also rejected on the grounds that he had been out of the country during the 90 days before he filed his candidacy.

Prior to the election, three of the 11 remaining candidates were considered the key contenders for the Presidency: PAIGC candidate Sanhá, PRS candidate Ialá, and independent candidate Rosa.

== Campaign ==
Doubting that Ialá would be able to garner much more support than he obtained in the first round, analysts judged that Sanhá was the clear favorite for the second round. Various minor candidates—Luis Nancassa, Paulo Mendonça, Francisca Vaz Turpin, and Braima Alfa Djalo—endorsed Sanhá after the first round. In mid-July, New Democracy Party candidate Iaia Djalo, who placed fourth with 3.11%, also urged his supporters to vote for Sanhá in the second round.

During the second round campaign, Ialá blamed PAIGC for Guinea-Bissau's problems and alleged that it was responsible for Vieira's assassination. Warning against the use of such inflammatory rhetoric, the army stressed that it would not allow national stability to be endangered.

== Conduct ==
On 5 June, one day before election campaigning was due to start, Dabó was fatally shot in his home, possibly in order to prevent him from ordering a prosecution against President Vieira's killers if he won the election. It was nevertheless decided that the election would proceed as planned on 28 June. Another independent candidate, Paulo Mendonça, said that the election could not legally go ahead on schedule because the constitution required a delay in case of the death of a candidate, and he took the matter to the Supreme Court. Rosa said that his campaign would be initially subdued and would not begin in earnest until seven days after Dabó's death.

Turnout was reportedly low when voting took place on 28 June. Electoral observers from the European Union were present at 80 of the 2,700 polling stations, and the head of the EU mission, Johan Van Hecke, said that "rain played a role" but that it was not solely to blame for the low turnout. He also said that voting proceeded "in a calm and orderly way" and that "not a single incident or complaint was reported to us".

== Results ==
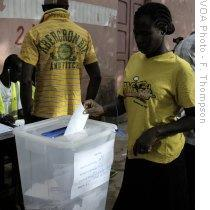
Voters cast their ballots on June 28, 2009. VOA photo

Desejado Lima da Costa, the head of the National Electoral Commission, announced provisional results on 2 July 2009. These results showed Sanhá with 133,786 votes or 39.59% of the vote, Ialá with 99,428 votes or 29.42%, and Rosa with 24.19%; turnout was around 60%, with 593,782 of the nation's 1.4 million eligible voters participating. As a result, Sanhá and Ialá were to proceed to a second round on 2 August. Although Rosa was positioned to make a potentially crucial endorsement for the second round, he declined to do so. The National Electoral Commission announced on 5 July that the second round date was being moved forward from 2 August to 26 July, as the latter date was deemed more compatible with the agricultural harvest season.

On 25 July, Sanhá and Ialá agreed that they would both respect the results of the second round and that any dispute over the results would be handled through the legal process. They also agreed that the losing candidate would enjoy various privileges as a former head of state, including personal security and transportation. Following the second round on 26 July, the National Electoral Commission announced on 29 July that Sanhá had won with 63.52% of the vote (224,259 votes), while Ialá received 36.48%. Turnout was placed at 61%. Ialá said that he accepted the results, urging Sanhá "to work for the development of Guinea-Bissau".

| Candidate | Party | First round | | Second round | |
| Candidate | Party | Votes | % | Votes | % |
|---|---|---|---|---|---|
| Malam Bacai Sanhá | African Party for the Independence of Guinea and Cape Verde | 133,786 | 39.59 | 224,259 | 63.31 |
| Mohamed Ialá Embaló | Party for Social Renewal | 99,428 | 29.42 | 129,973 | 36.69 |
| Henrique Pereira Rosa | Independent | 81,751 | 24.19 | | |
| Mamadú Iaia Djaló | New Democracy Party | 10,495 | 3.11 | | |
| João Gomes Cardoso | Independent | 4,115 | 1.22 | | |
| Serifo Baldé | Young Party | 1,794 | 0.53 | | |
| Aregado Mantenque Té | Workers' Party | 1,736 | 0.51 | | |
| Ibraima Djaló | Independent | 1,489 | 0.44 | | |
| Zinha Vaz | Guinean Patriotic Union | 1,219 | 0.36 | | |
| Luís Nancassa | Independent | 1,195 | 0.35 | | |
| Paulo Mendonça | Independent | 949 | 0.28 | | |
| Total | | 337,957 | 100.00 | 354,232 | 100.00 |
| Valid votes | | 337,957 | 94.84 | 354,232 | 97.66 |
| Invalid/blank votes | | 18,383 | 5.16 | 8,504 | 2.34 |
| Total votes | | 356,340 | 100.00 | 362,736 | 100.00 |
| Registered voters/turnout | | 593,765 | 60.01 | 593,765 | 61.09 |
Source: African Elections Database
