= 2004 Guinea-Bissau parliamentary election =

- 28 March 2004
Party	Leader	Vote %	Seats	+/–
PAIGC	Carlos Gomes Júnior	33.88	45	+24
PRS	Kumba Ialá	26.50	35	−3
PUSD	Francisco Fadul	17.60	17	New
UE	Joaquim Baldé	8.47	2	New
APU	Fernando Gomes	1.36	1	New
This lists parties that won seats. See the complete results below.
Results by constituency.
Prime Minister before	Prime Minister after
Artur Sanhá; PRS	Carlos Gomes Júnior; PAIGC

Parliamentary elections were held in Guinea-Bissau on 28 March 2004 after repeated postponements caused by political and financial chaos in the country, including a coup d'état that overthrew President Kumba Ialá in September 2003. The former ruling party, the African Party for the Independence of Guinea and Cape Verde (PAIGC), won the largest number of seats, but did not obtain a majority. Former President Yala's party, the Party for Social Renewal (PRS), came second with 35 seats.

The PAIGC reached an agreement with the PRS for its parliamentary support (a previous attempt at reaching a deal with the United Social Democratic Party, which won 17 seats, failed), and in May 2004 the new parliament was sworn in, with PAIGC leader Carlos Gomes Júnior becoming prime minister.

== Conduct ==
Although voting reportedly took place on time in the interior of Guinea-Bissau, it was delayed in much of the capital Bissau, as electoral materials were delivered late to many polling stations. The National Electoral Commission ordered the polling stations that opened late to remain open past the scheduled end of voting to ensure that everyone would have a chance to vote. About a third of polling stations in Bissau reportedly never opened on the day of the election, and these stations were ordered to open on the following day, March 29.

Over 100 international observers were present for the election. The United Nations, the Economic Community of West African States (ECOWAS), the Community of Portuguese Language Countries, and La Francophonie sent observers, as did Portugal, Russia and the United States.

== Results ==
Party	Votes	%	Seats	+/–
African Party for the Independence of Guinea and Cape Verde	145,316	33.88	45	+21
Party for Social Renewal	113,656	26.50	35	–3
United Social Democratic Party	75,485	17.60	17	New
United Platform	20,700	4.83	0	–
Electoral Union	18,354	4.28	2	–
Democratic Socialist Party	8,789	2.05	0	New
Union for Change	8,621	2.01	0	–3
Resistance of Guinea-Bissau-Bafatá Movement	7,918	1.85	0	–28
National Unity Party	6,260	1.46	0	New
United People's Alliance	5,817	1.36	1	New
National Union for Democracy and Progress	5,042	1.18	0	–1
Guinean Civic Forum–Social Democracy	4,209	0.98	0	0
Guinean Democratic Movement	4,202	0.98	0	New
Manifest Party of the People	3,402	0.79	0	New
Socialist Party	1,166	0.27	0	New
Total	428,937	100.00	100	–2
Valid votes	428,937	93.20		
Invalid/blank votes	31,317	6.80		
Total votes	460,254	100.00		
Registered voters/turnout	603,639	76.25		
Source: CNE
