= Soares Sambú =

Bissau-Guinean politician

Soares Sambú (c. 1975) is a Bissau-Guinean engineer and politician who was deputy of the National People's Assembly and minister of the Presidency of the Council of Ministers, an agency that accumulates the functions of deputy head of government.

== Biography and career ==
He graduated in engineering with focus on the agricultural area still in the former Soviet Union.

He joined the political career by joining the African Party for the Independence of Guinea and Cape Verde (PAIGC), gaining positions quickly in the 1990s. He was promoted to the position of first vice-president of the National People's Assembly in the second multi-party legislature in 1999. It was in office until 2002, when parliament was dissolved.

He was the campaign manager for the African Party for the Independence of Guinea and Cape Verde (PAIGC) during the March 2004 parliamentary election, in which PAIGC won a plurality of seats; following the election, he became Minister of External Affairs on May 12, 2004, as part of the government of the new Prime Minister, Carlos Gomes Júnior. Carlos Gomes's government was dismissed in November 2005, and Sambu was replaced as Foreign Minister.

In the government of Prime Minister Martinho Ndafa Kabi, named on April 17, 2007, Sambú was appointed as Minister of Natural Resources; he was retained as Minister of Natural Resources and the Environment in the government of Prime Minister Carlos Correia, appointed on August 9, 2008. In the November 2008 legislative election, PAIGC won a majority of 67 out of 100 seats in the National People's Assembly, and Sambú was elected to a seat as a PAIGC candidate in the 12th constituency, Bafata e Cosse.

On June 7, 2013, he took over the Ministry of Economy and Regional Integration, one of the key branches of the transitional government of Prime Minister Rui Duarte de Barros, leaving office in 2014 to contest the legislative elections.

He was re-elected as a deputy in the general elections in Guinea-Bissau in 2014, having become one of 15 dissident MPs of the PAIGC, which formed the independent wing of the party.

On 16 June 2016 he became, for the second time, Minister for Foreign Affairs, International Cooperation and Communities, appointed by Prime Minister Baciro Djá.

To Umaro Sissoco Embaló to assume like prime minister, in 2016, became political-diplomatic adviser of this one; on August 2, 2017 José Mário Vaz appoints him as Minister of the Presidency of the Council of Ministers, a position that in practice exercises the functions of deputy prime minister.

He has been an MP for nearly 20 years, where he held the positions of the Chairman of the Permanent Commission for Agriculture, Natural Resources, Environment, Fisheries and Tourism; President of the Technical Commission of the Elaboration of the Law of the Earth between other functions of relief inside and outside Guinean State.

Government offices
Preceded by João José Monteiro	Foreign Minister of Guinea-Bissau; 2004-2005	Succeeded by António Isaac Monteiro
