= 2023 in Guinea-Bissau =

- Decades: 2000s; 2010s; 2020s
- See also: Other events of 2023; Timeline of Guinea-Bissauan history

Events in the year 2023 in Guinea-Bissau.

== Incumbents ==
- President: Umaro Sissoco Embaló
- Prime Minister:
  - Nuno Gomes Nabiam (until 8 August)
  - Geraldo Martins (8 August – 20 December)
  - Rui Duarte de Barros (20 December onwards)

== Events ==
Ongoing — COVID-19 pandemic in Guinea-Bissau

- 4 June - 2023 Guinea-Bissau legislative election
- 8 July - Geraldo Martins is appointed as the prime minister of Guinea-Bissau.
- 18 October - Guinea-Bissau's capital Bissau experiences a major blackout after Turkish energy firm Karpowership cuts the supply of electricity to the city over an unpaid bill of at least $15m. The Guinea-Bissauan government says the outstanding amount will be paid within 15 days.
- 30 November-1 December - Clashes break out in Bissau between government forces and units of the National Guard who had released two ministers accused of corruption from detention. The clashes end with the arrest of National Guard commander Colonel Victor Tchongo and the recapture of the two ministers. President Umaro Sissoco Embaló calls the events as an attempted coup.
- 4 December - Embalo dissolves the National People's Assembly.
- 20 December - Embalo dismisses Geraldo Martins as prime minister and replaces him with Rui Duarte de Barros.
