= 2019 in Guinea-Bissau =

- Decades: 1990s; 2000s; 2010s; 2020s
- See also: History of Guinea-Bissau; List of years in Guinea-Bissau

Events in the year 2019 in Guinea-Bissau.

== Incumbents ==
- President: José Mário Vaz
- Prime Minister: Aristides Gomes

== Events ==
- 10 March – 2019 Guinea-Bissau parliamentary election
- 24 November – 2019 Guinea-Bissau presidential election
