= 2026 in Guinea-Bissau =

- Decades: 2000s; 2010s; 2020s
- See also: History of Guinea-Bissau; List of years in Guinea-Bissau

Events in the year 2026 in Guinea-Bissau.

== Incumbents ==
- President: High Military Command for the Restoration of Order (led by Horta Inta-A Na Man)
- Prime Minister: Ilídio Vieira Té

== Events ==
- 22 January – The government suspends a US-backed review of the effects of hepatitis B vaccines on newborns pending an ethics review.
- 30 January – Opposition leader Domingos Simões Pereira is released from prison after being detained following the 2025 Guinea-Bissau coup d'état in November.
- 6–22 February – Guinea-Bissau at the 2026 Winter Olympics
- 13 July – A court-martial orders opposition leader and former Prime Minister Domingos Simões Pereira back to prison, accusing him of involvement in an alleged October 2025 coup attempt.
- 30 August – 2026 Guinea-Bissau constitutional referendum: Around 70% of voters approve a new constitution expanding presidential powers, with the size of parliament reduced from 102 to 65 seats.

=== Scheduled ===
- 6 December – 2026 Guinea-Bissau general election

== Holidays ==
- 1 January – New Year's Day
- 20 January – Heroes' Day
- 8 March – International Women's Day
- 30 March – Korité
- 1 May – Labour Day
- 6 June – Tabaski
- 3 August – Pidjiguiti Day
- 24 September – National Day
- 14 November – Readjustment Movement Day
- 25 December – Christmas Day

== Deaths ==
- March – Vigario Luis Balanta, rapper and founder of the Po' di Terra political movement.
