= Ministry of Justice (Guinea-Bissau) =

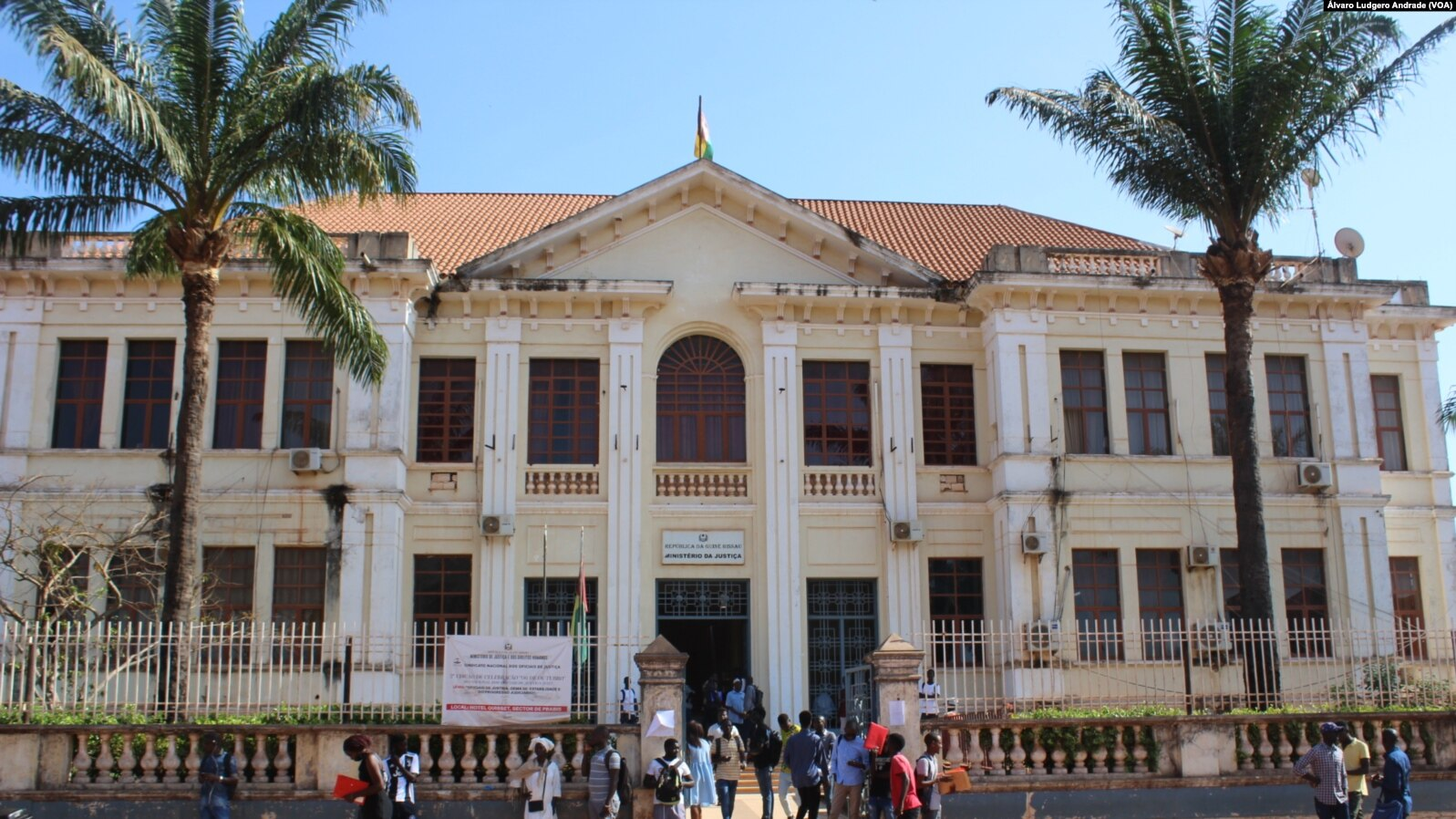
Ministry in Bissau

The Ministry of Justice of Guinea-Bissau has duties such as overseeing the administration and human resources of the judiciary and the Public Prosecutor, publishing and disseminating legal information to the public, and combating organized crime and drug trafficking that might threaten the safety of the country's citizens and impact the justice system.

== List of ministers (Post-1974 upon achieving independence) ==
- Fidelis Almeida Cabral (1974-1983) [referred to as the Commissioner of Justice]
- Filinto de Barros (1983-1984) [referred to as the Commissioner of Justice]
- Paulo Correia (1985-1986) [referred to as the Minister of Justice & Local Government]
- Vasco Cabral (1986-1987)
- Nicandro Pereira Barreto (1988-1990)
- Mario Cabral (1990-1991)
- Joao Aurigema Cruz Pinto (1992)
- Mamadu Aliu Djalo Pires (1992-1994)
- Daniel Ferreira (1994-1999)
- Carlos Domingos Gomes (2000)
- Antonieta Rosa Gomes (2000-2001) [1st female]
- Dionisio Cabi (2001)
- Carlos Pinto Pereira (2002)
- Vesa Gomes Naluak (2002-2003)
- Raimundo Perreira (2004-2006)
- Namuano Dias Gomes (2006-2007)
- Carmelita Barbosa Rodrigues Pires (2007-2009)
- Mamadu Djalo Pires (2009-2011)
- Adelino Mano Queta (2011-2012)
- Mamadu Saido Balde (2012-2013)
- Carmelita Pires (2014-2017)
- Rui Sanha (2017–2018)
- Mamadú Iaia Djaló (2018–2019)
- Ruth Monteiro (2019–2020)

== See also ==
- Justice ministry
- Politics of Guinea-Bissau
