= Fernando Dias =

Bissau-Guinean politician and lawyer

Fernando Dias da Costa
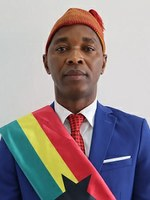

Vice-President of the National People's Assembly
- In office 27 July 2023 – 4 December 2023

Personal details
- Born: 1977 or 1978 (age 47–48) Guinea-Bissau
- Party: Independent
- Education: Faculdade de Direito de Bissau
- Profession: Lawyer

Fernando Dias da Costa (born 1977 or 1978) is a Bissau-Guinean politician and lawyer. He was one of two major candidates in the 2025 Guinea-Bissau general election, running as an independent. He has served as vice-president of the National People's Assembly and as president of the Party for Social Renewal (PSR).

== Biography ==
Dias was born in 1977 or 1978, and is from Guinea-Bissau. He graduated from the Faculdade de Direito de Bissau in Guinea-Bissau and afterwards entered law. He later entered politics, and by 2020, he was serving as the Minister of Territorial Administration and Local Power in the government of Nuno Gomes Nabiam. Following the 2023 Guinea-Bissau parliamentary election, in which the Inclusive Alliance Platform – Terra Ranka won the most seats, Dias was named vice-president of the National People's Assembly. In December 2023, the parliament was dissolved by president Umaro Sissoco Embaló, a member of the opposing Madem G15 party, who refused to let the parliament sit afterwards.

After the death of Alberto Nambeia, Dias was named interim president of the Party for Social Renewal (PSR). In June 2024, he was elected the new president of the PSR. In 2025, Dias announced his candidacy in the 2025 Guinea-Bissau general election, running as an independent against incumbent President Umaro Sissoco Embaló. Viewed as a political outsider and "relatively unknown," he emerged as Embaló's top challenger after former Prime Minister Domingos Simões Pereira and his party were banned from running for office by the Supreme Court. Dias received the endorsement of Pereira's party prior to the election.

On 24 November 2025, a day after the election took place, both Dias and Embaló declared themselves as the victor, with the official results having been planned to be published by the national electoral commission on 27 November. However, a military coup broke out on 26 November, resulting in the reported arrest of Dias and several other politicians including Embaló. Dias later released a video saying that he had escaped and vowed to resist the coup. He later fled to the Nigerian embassy and was granted protection by the Nigerian government. On 30 January 2026, Dias was allowed to leave the Nigerian embassy, but refused offers by the junta to take part in a transitional government.
