= Guinean Workers' Party =

Guinean Workers' Party Partido dos Trabalhadores Guineenses
- Abbreviation: PTG
- Leader: Botche Candé
- Founder: Botche Candé
- Founded: 16 December 2021
- Split from: Madem G15; Party for Social Renewal; APU-PDGB
- Headquarters: Bissau
- Ideology: Social democracy
- Political position: Centre-left
- Slogan: «Together for Guinea-Bissau» (Portuguese: «Juntos pela Guiné-Bissau»)
- National People's Assembly: 6 / 102

Website
- ptg.gw (archived)

The Guinean Workers' Party (PTG; Portuguese: Partido dos Trabalhadores Guineenses) is a political party in Guinea-Bissau, founded in 2021 by then-time Minister of the Interior Botche Candé.

== History ==
The Guinean Workers' Party was formed in December 2021 by Botche Candé, a former member of the Party for Social Renewal (PRS) and Minister of the Interior in the government of Nuno Gomes Nabiam. It is made up of leaders and executives from different political formations such as Mama Saliu Lambá, former first vice-president of the Assembly of the People United (APU-PDGB), as well as members of the Madem G15 party.

The party held its founding congress in the Bissau on 16–17 December 2021, after which Botche Candé was elected President of the PTG.

In 2023, the party participated in the 2023 parliamentary elections for the first time, and won 6 seats out of 102 in the National People's Assembly.

== Electoral history ==
=== National People's Assembly ===
Election	Votes	%	Seats	+/–	Position	Government
2023	54,784	8.17%	6 / 102	New	▲4th	TBA
