= Ministry of Foreign Affairs (Guinea-Bissau) =

The Ministry of Foreign Affairs of Guinea-Bissau (Portuguese: Ministério dos Negócios Estrangeiros da Guiné-Bissau) is the government agency responsible for overseeing the foreign policy of the Republic of Guinea-Bissau. It is one of the key ministries in the Guinea-Bissau Government and plays a crucial role in the management of the diplomatic service of the country.

== List of ministers ==
Picture	Name	Start	End	President
	Victor Saúde Maria	1973	1982	Luís Cabral João Bernardo Vieira
	Samba Lamine Mané	1982	1983	João Bernardo Vieira
	Fidélis Cabral d'Almada	1983	1984	João Bernardo Vieira
	Júlio Semedo	1984	1992	João Bernardo Vieira
	Bernardino Cardoso	1992	1995	João Bernardo Vieira
	Ansumane Mané	1995	1996	João Bernardo Vieira
	Fernando Delfim da Silva	1996	1999	João Bernardo Vieira
	Hilia Barber	1999	1999	João Bernardo Vieira
	José Pereira Baptista	1999	2000	Malam Bacai Sanhá
	Mamadú Iaia Djaló	2000	2001	Guna Yala
	Faustino Imbali	2001	2001	Guna Yala
	Antonieta Rosa Gomes	2001	2001	Guna Yala
	Malam Mané	2001	2001	Guna Yala
	Filomena Mascarenhas Tipote	2001	2002	Guna Yala
	Joãozinho Vieira Có	2002	2003	Guna Yala
	Fatumata Djau Baldé	2003	2003	Henrique Rosa
	João José Monteiro	2003	2004	Henrique Rosa
	Soares Sambú	2004	2005	Henrique Rosa
	António Isaac Monteiro	2005	2007	João Bernardo Vieira
	Maria da Conceição Nobre Cabral	2007	2009	João Bernardo Vieira
	Adiato Djaló Nandigna	2009	2009	Malam Bacai Sanhá
	Adelino Mano Quetá	2009	2011	Malam Bacai Sanhá
	Mamadu Saliu Djaló Pires	2011	2012	Malam Bacai Sanhá
	Faustino Imbali	2012	2013	Manuel Serifo Nhamadjo
	Fernando Delfim da Silva	2013	2014	Manuel Serifo Nhamadjo
	Mário Lopes da Rosa	2014	2015	José Mário Vaz
	Rui Dia de Sousa	2015	2015	José Mário Vaz
	Artur Silva	2015	2016	José Mário Vaz
	Soares Sambú	2016	2016	José Mário Vaz
	Jorge Malú	2016	2018	José Mário Vaz
	João Ribeiro Butiam Có	2018	2019	José Mário Vaz
	Suzi Barbosa	2019	2020	José Mário Vaz
	Ruth Monteiro	2020	2020	Umaro Sissoco Embaló
	Aristides Ocante Da Silva	2020	2020	Umaro Sissoco Embaló
	Suzi Barbosa	2020	2023	Umaro Sissoco Embaló
	Carlos Pinto Pereira	2023	2025	Umaro Sissoco Embaló
	João Bernardo Vieira	2025	Present	Horta Inta-A Na Man

== Sources ==
- Rulers.org – Foreign ministers E–K
