= Lesmes Monteiro =

- Born: Lesmes Mutna Freire Monteiro; 30 August 1985 (age 40); Bissau, Guinea Bissau
- Occupations: coordinator of Children Right at Plan International, activist of human rights

Lesmes Mutna Freire Monteiro (born 1985) is a Guinea Bissauan jurist and rapper known for his human rights activism.

He was a member of the Vigilant Non-Compliant Citizen's Movement (MCCI).

In April 2017, he was attacked by a group of strangers for the alleged protests against President José Mário Vaz.

Monteiro has a law degree from the Faculty of Law of Bissau.
