= 2023 Guinea-Bissau clashes =

Attempted coup in Guinea-Bissau

- Part of the Coup Belt
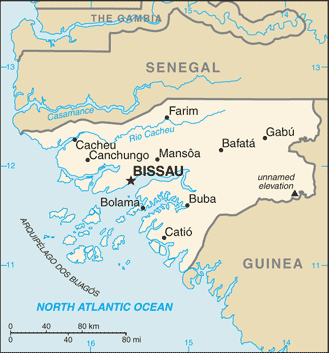
Date	30 November 2023 – 1 December 2023 (1 day)
Location	Bissau, Guinea-Bissau

Belligerents
Guinea-Bissau: Revolutionary Armed Forces of the People; Presidential Guard	National Guard

Commanders and leaders
Umaro Sissoco Embaló	Victor Tchongo

Strength
Unknown	Unknown

Casualties and losses
6 soldiers injured	Unknown
- 2 killed

On 30 November 2023, clashes broke out in Bissau, the capital of Guinea-Bissau, between government forces and units of the National Guard who had released two ministers accused of corruption from detention. The clashes led to the arrest of National Guard commander Colonel Victor Tchongo. President Umaro Sissoco Embaló described the events as an attempted coup. Following the clashes, Embaló ordered the dissolution of the country's legislature.

== Background ==
Guinea-Bissau's semi-presidential system limits the powers of the president by allowing the majority party in the National People's Assembly to appoint the Cabinet, which also means that the legislature, currently dominated since elections in June 2023 by the opposition PAIGC party, which is critical of President Umaro Sissoco Embaló, also controls the National Guard, which falls under the jurisdiction of the interior ministry.

In 2022, Embaló survived a coup attempt against him that left 11 people dead, which prompted him to dissolve the legislature, citing “unresolvable differences” with the body. Since independence from Portugal in 1974, Guinea-Bissau has had at least 10 attempted coups or coups, and only a single democratically elected president has completed a full term in office.

== Events ==
=== Detention of ministers ===
On the morning of 30 November 2023, Finance Minister Souleiman Seidi and Treasury Secretary António Monteiro were subjected to questioning by an anti-corruption inquiry amid investigations into the alleged irregular withdrawal of $10 million in state funds that were found to have been paid to 11 companies. Following the questioning, they were placed under arrest on orders of state prosecutors, who were presidential appointees. The leader of the opposition in the National People's Assembly alleged that the owners of the companies were close to leaders of the country's PAIGC-led governing coalition. The ministers were held at a police station near the Bandim market in Bissau.

=== Forced release of the ministers ===
Later that evening, members of the National Guard "armed with AK-47 weapons and bazookas" stormed the police station were Seidi and Monteiro were held and released the ministers from their cells. The ministers were subsequently taken to an undisclosed location and were later found by authorities after the Public Ministry ordered their rearrest, while the guardsmen involved in their release retreated to a barracks in the Santa Luzia district.

=== Clashes ===
Following the incident, gunfire was reported between the National Guard and pro-government forces led by special forces of the Presidential Palace Battalion after 23:00 at the Antula neighborhood and near the presidential palace, as well as in the Luanda neighborhood in the outskirts of Bissau, where the National Guard's intervention brigade is based. Shooting continued until noon on 1 December, when the army announced that the commander of the National Guard, Colonel Victor Tchongo, had been captured, although other accounts claimed that he had surrendered. A photo released by the army showed Tchongo under custody in a pick-up truck in apparently bloody clothing. On the morning of 1 December, military vehicles and roadblocks were seen on the streets of Bissau, while security was increased around strategic installations such as the judicial police headquarters, the presidential palace and some ministries. Regional stabilisation forces deployed by ECOWAS were also seen patrolling the streets.

Two people were killed in the fighting, while six pro-government soldiers were injured and evacuated to neighboring Senegal. The army said that an unspecified number officers and personnel from the National Guard fled into the interior of the country. Several residents also fled south of the capital.

== Aftermath ==
Embaló, who was attending the 2023 United Nations Climate Change Conference in Dubai when the clashes broke out, returned to Guinea-Bissau on the evening of 2 December and ordered Victor Tchongo's dismissal as commander of the National Guard. He called the clashes an "attempted coup" that was prepared before celebrations on 16 November commemorating the founding of Guinea-Bissau's armed forces. Following a visit to the National Guard barracks, Embaló said that Tchongo was "ordered by someone" to release Seidi and Monteiro. Addressing the Guard, Embaló said that they had been "betrayed" by Tchongo and vowed that he would "pay dearly". He further alleged that there had been "complicity" between the national guard and "certain political interests within the State apparatus" and condemned "the passivity of the government", adding that the National Guard had sought to block investigations into the two ministers.

On 4 December, Embaló issued a decree dissolving the National People's Assembly and ordered soldiers to be deployed at the headquarters of state media outlets National Broadcasting of Guinea-Bissau and Guinea-Bissau Television to replace their heads, who were seen as loyal to the assembly. Embaló also announced that Prime Minister Geraldo Martins would remain in office, but that he was taking over the defence and interior ministry portfolios. In response, assembly speaker Domingos Simões Pereira, a long-time rival of Embaló, accused the president of carrying out a "constitutional coup d'etat", noting that the constitution states that the legislature cannot be dissolved in the first 12 months after an election, which was last held in June 2023. Following the announcement, several youth were seen burning tires at a street near the assembly building, while several people gathered in front of the building in protest over the dissolution, expressing fatigue over the need to vote again.

On 20 December, Embaló dismissed Martins as prime minister and appointed Rui Duarte de Barros, another member of the PAIGC, to replace him.

== Reactions ==
=== Domestic ===
Government spokesman Francisco Muniro Conte said that a "president who is elected must complete his term of office", adding that "we cannot obstruct people who are facing justice, if the law is really respected."

=== International ===
ECOWAS issued a statement saying that it “strongly condemns the violence and all attempts to disrupt the constitutional order and rule of law in Guinea-Bissau" and called "for the arrest and prosecution of the perpetrators of the incident in accordance with the law." African Union chair Moussa Faki issued a statement saying that he "strongly condemns the recent violence in Guinea-Bissau, perpetrated by elements of the National Guard", while expressing concern over Embaló's decision to dissolve the National Assembly.

Stéphane Dujarric, the spokesperson for United Nations Secretary-General António Guterres, called for calm and urged the security forces and the army “to continue refraining from interference in national politics”.
