= LIPE =

LIPE may refer to:

- Guinean League for Ecological Protection, a political party in Guinea-Bissau
- Hormone-sensitive lipase, an enzyme
- The ICAO-code of Bologna Guglielmo Marconi Airport
