= List of universities in Guinea-Bissau =

This is a list of universities in Guinea-Bissau:

== Universities ==
- Universidade Amílcar Cabral (Amílcar Cabral University)
- Universidade Colinas de Boé (University of Colinas de Boé)
- Universidade Lusófona (an extension of the Portuguese university of the same name)
- Universidade Jean Piaget (an extension of the Portuguese Instituto Jean Piaget)
- Universidade Católica da Guiné-Bissau (Catholic University of Guinea Bissau)
- Higher School of Education of Guinea-Bissau
- National School of Health of Guinea-Bissau
