= Guinea-Bissau (disambiguation) =

Guinea-Bissau is a country in West Africa.

Guinea-Bissau may also refer to:

- Guinea-Bissau national football team
- Guinea-Bissau women's national football team
- Guinea-Bissau men's national basketball team
- Universidade Católica da Guiné-Bissau (Catholic University of Guinea Bissau) - see List of universities in Guinea-Bissau
