= 2023 Guinea-Bissau parliamentary election =

- 4 June 2023
- All 102 seats in the National People's Assembly; 52 seats needed for a majority
- Turnout: 79.57% (▼5.12 pp)
Party	Leader	Vote %	Seats	+/–
PAI–Terra Ranka	Domingos Simões Pereira	39.42	54	+6
Madem G15	Braima Camará	24.39	29	+2
PRS	Florentino Mendes Pereira	14.98	12	−9
PTG	Botche Candé	8.17	6	New
APU	Nuno Gomes Nabiam	4.44	1	−4
This lists parties that won seats. See the complete results below.
Results by constituency
Prime Minister before	Prime Minister after
Nuno Gomes Nabiam; APU	Geraldo Martins; PAIGC

Snap parliamentary elections were held in Guinea-Bissau on 4 June 2023. Incumbent president Umaro Sissoco Embalo dissolved the parliament on 16 May 2022, accusing deputies of corruption and "unresolvable" differences between the National People's Assembly and other government branches.

The result was a victory for the opposition coalition Inclusive Alliance Platform – Terra Ranka led by the African Party for the Independence of Guinea and Cape Verde, which won 54 of the 102 seats.

== Electoral system ==
The 102 members of the National People's Assembly are elected by two methods; 100 by closed list proportional representation from 27 multi-member constituencies and two from single-member constituencies representing expatriate citizens in Africa and Europe.

== Results ==
Party	Votes	%	Seats	+/–
PAI – Terra Ranka (PAIGC–UM–PCD–PSD–MDG)	264,240	39.42	54	+6
Madem G15	163,509	24.39	29	+2
Party for Social Renewal	100,429	14.98	12	–9
Guinean Workers' Party	54,784	8.17	6	New
Assembly of the People United	29,787	4.44	1	–4
Resistance of Guinea-Bissau-Bafatá Movement	10,989	1.64	0	0
New Democracy Party	7,111	1.06	0	–1
Patriotic Front of National Salvation	6,379	0.95	0	0
National Convergence for Freedom and Development	5,200	0.78	0	New
African National Congress	4,526	0.68	0	0
African Party for Peace and Social Stability	4,272	0.64	0	New
Light Party	3,021	0.45	0	New
Social Democratic Movement	3,020	0.45	0	New
Guiné NOBU	2,600	0.39	0	New
National Unity Party	2,368	0.35	0	0
Republican Party for Independence and Development	2,363	0.35	0	0
African Party for Freedom and Development	1,657	0.25	0	New
Our Homeland Party	1,155	0.17	0	New
United Social Democratic Party	1,070	0.16	0	New
Alliance for the Republic	757	0.11	0	New
Manifest Party of the People	717	0.11	0	0
Democratic Centre	303	0.05	0	0
Total	670,257	100.00	102	0
Valid votes	670,257	94.26		
Invalid/blank votes	40,801	5.74		
Total votes	711,058	100.00		
Registered voters/turnout	893,618	79.57		
Source: CNE, O Democrata, CNE

== Aftermath ==
President Embalo dissolved the opposition-controlled parliament on 4 December 2023, saying an "attempted coup" had prevented him from returning home from COP28 climate conference. In response to the dissolution, parliamentary speaker Domingos Simões Pereira accused the president of carrying out a "constitutional coup d'etat." Incumbent president Embalo would go on to fire the prime minister Geraldo Martins, who was appointed by the PAIGC-led National Assembly and instead appoint Rui Duarte de Barros by presidential decree.
