= 2020 in Guinea-Bissau =

- Decades: 2000s; 2010s; 2020s
- See also: Other events of 2020; Timeline of Guinea-Bissauan history

Events in the year 2020 in Guinea-Bissau.

== Incumbents ==
- President: José Mário Vaz (until 27 February) Umaro Sissoco Embaló (from 27 February)
- Prime Minister: Aristides Gomes (until 28 February) Nuno Gomes Nabiam (from 28 February)

== Events ==
=== March ===
- 25 March – The country confirmed its first two COVID-19 cases, a Congolese U.N. employee and an Indian citizen.
- 28 March – A month-long state of emergency with night-time curfew was introduced in the country.

=== April ===
- 26 April – The first COVID-19 death was recorded in the country. The state of emergency was extended until 11 May as a result.
- 29 April – Prime Minister Nuno Gomes Nabiam, Interior Minister Botche Candé, Secretary of State for Public Order Mario Fambé, and Secretary of State for Regional Integration Monica Buaro da Costa tested positive for COVID-19.

=== May ===
- 1 May – The Minister of Public Health Antonio Deuna tested positive for COVID-19.

=== June ===
- 16 June – It was reported by Reuters that 9% of health care workers have been infected with COVID-19. According to Joana Cortez, a WHO expert in the country, the three main Bissau hospitals are currently facing rooms filled with COVID-19 patients and a breakdown in essential medical services.
- 26 June – President Umaro Sissoco Embaló announced a one-month extension of the state of emergency, but lifted the curfew.
