= Manuel dos Santos 'Manecas' =

Bissau-Guinean politician

Manuel dos Santos
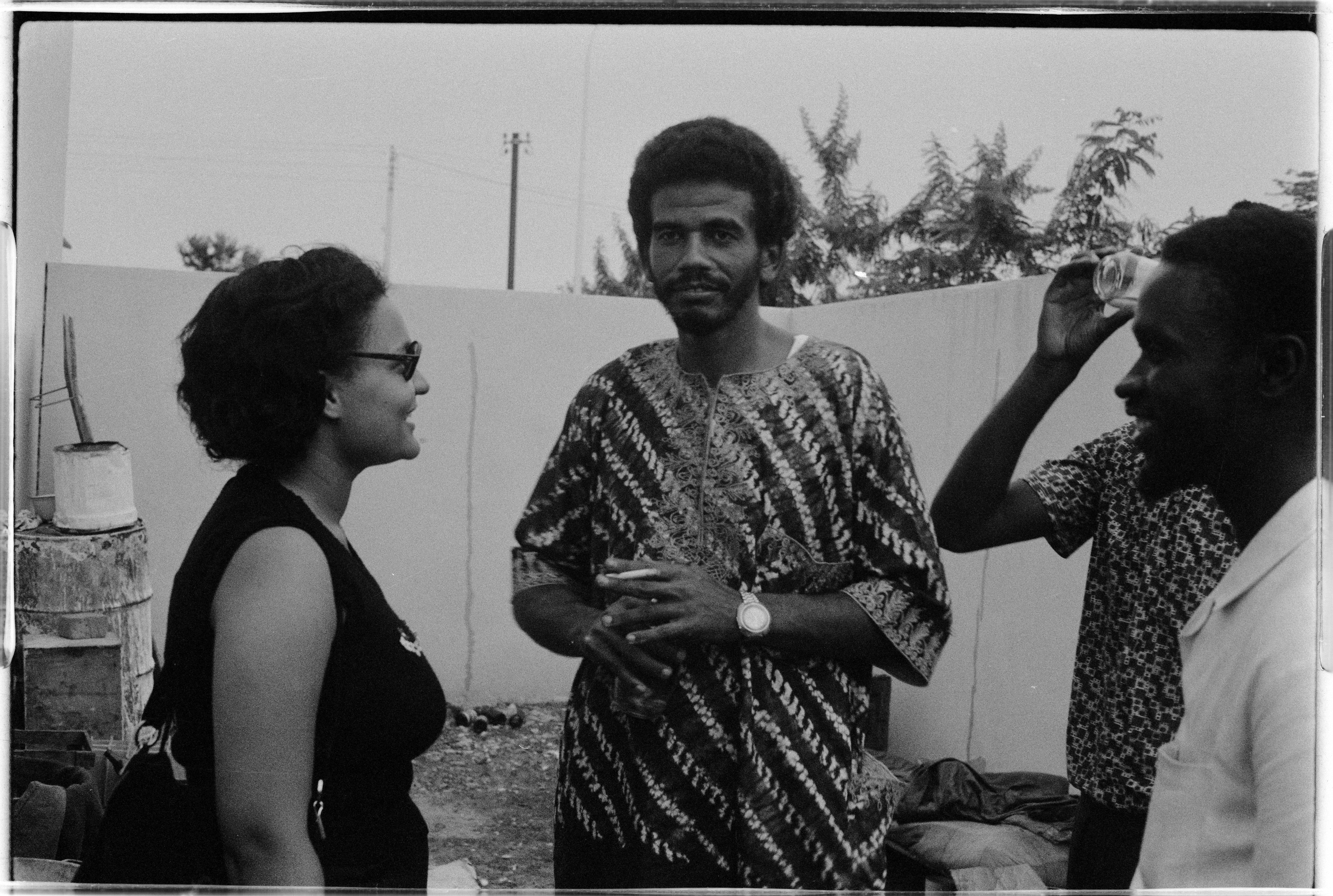
- 'Manecas' in the middle in 1973

Vice President of Guinea-Bissau
- In office April 1987 – June 1989
- President: João Bernardo Vieira
- Preceded by: Iafai Camará
- Succeeded by: Vasco Cabral

Personal details
- Born: 30 October 1942 (age 83) São Vicente, Cape Verde
- Party: PAIGC

Colonel Manuel dos Santos, also known as 'Comandante Manecas', is a Bissau-Guinean politician from PAIGC.

He was born as Manuel Maria Monteiro Santos in São Vicente, Cape Verde, on 30 October 1942. He was recruited in 1957 as a member of PAIGC. He was trained in military academies in Cuba and USSR, and became artillery commander in the war for independence. He led the group of guerrillas who used Strela anti-aircraft missiles against the Portuguese aircraft.

In the independent Guinea-Bissau, Manecas served in different governmental positions including minister of transport and tourism in 1978 and minister of information and telecommunication, minister of social infrastructure, minister of the economy and finance, and minister of natural resources and industry.

Even though fellow Cape Verdean Luís Cabral was ousted in the 1980 coup, Manecas remained in Guinea-Bissau and its politics. He was a close associate of João Bernardo Vieira, who led the 1980 coup. Manecas was appointed Second Vice President from April 1987 to June 1989. He was the minister of finance from 1990 until 1991 or 1992.

After the 2005 re-election of João Bernardo Vieira as president, Manecas resumed his business activities. In March 2011, he was appointment as ambassador to Angola. After the 2012 coup d'état, Manecas was appointed as ambassador to the United Nations.
