= Manuel dos Santos =

Manuel dos Santos can refer to:

- Manuel António dos Santos (1943–), Portuguese politician
- Manuel dos Santos 'Manecas' (1942-), Guinea-Bissau politician
- Manuel dos Santos (footballer) (1974–), French footballer
- Manuel dos Santos (swimmer) (1939–), Brazilian swimmer

== See also ==
- Garrincha (1933–1983), real name Manuel Francisco dos Santos, Brazilian footballer
