= 2014 in Guinea-Bissau =

- Decades: 1990s; 2000s; 2010s; 2020s
- See also: Other events of 2014; Timeline of Guinea-Bissauan history

Events in the year 2014 in Guinea-Bissau.

== Incumbents ==
- President: Manuel Serifo Nhamadjo
- Prime Minister: Rui Duarte de Barros

== Events ==
- 13 April - General election
- 18 May - Second round of the presidential election; won by José Mário Vaz.
