= Geraldo Martins =

Prime Minister of Guinea-Bissau in 2023

Prime Minister of Guinea-Bissau
- In office 8 August 2023 – 21 December 2023
- President: Umaro Sissoco Embaló
- Preceded by: Nuno Gomes Nabiam
- Succeeded by: Rui Duarte de Barros

Minister of Economy and Finance
- In office 2019–2020
- Prime Minister: Aristides Gomes
- Preceded by: Victor Mandinga
- Succeeded by: João Fadiá
- In office 4 July 2014 – 3 June 2016
- Prime Minister: Domingos Simões Pereira; Baciro Djá; Carlos Correia
- Preceded by: Gino Mendes
- Succeeded by: Henrique Horta dos Santos

Personal details
- Party: African Party for the Independence of Guinea and Cape Verde
- Education: University of London; Faculty of Law of Bissau

Geraldo João Martins is a Bissau-Guinean economist and politician who served as Prime Minister of Guinea-Bissau in 2023, and is the vice president of the African Party for the Independence of Guinea and Cape Verde. Prior to his tenure as prime minister he worked at the World Bank and was the Minister of Education and Minister of Economy and Finance.

== Early life and education ==
Geraldo Martins graduated from a school in Moldova in chemistry and physics. He graduated with a law degree from the Faculty of Law of Bissau and from the University of London with a master's degree in management and public policy.

== Career ==
From 2001 to 2003, Martins was the Minister of Education. From 2005 to 2014, Martins worked at the World Bank. Martins was the Minister of Economy and Finance in Prime Minister Domingos Simões Pereira's government. Martins is the vice-president of the African Party for the Independence of Guinea and Cape Verde (PAIGC).

PAIGC was a member of the coalition that won control of the National People's Assembly in the 2023 election. President Umaro Sissoco Embaló appointed Martins as prime minister on 8 August 2023. His cabinet consisted of nineteen ministers, with eight of them being women.

The assembly was dissolved on 4 December, but Martins was reappointed as prime minister on 12 December. Embaló appointed himself as Minister of the Interior and Defence in Martins' cabinet.

Embaló dismissed Martins as prime minister on 21 December 2023, and replaced him with Rui Duarte de Barros after Embaló claimed that there was an attempted coup.

== Works cited ==
=== News ===
- "Geraldo Martins appointed Prime Minister of Guinea-Bissau". The Rio Times. 8 August 2023. Archived from the original on 9 August 2023.
- "Geraldo Martins reconduzido ao cargo de primeiro-ministro". Voice of America. 12 December 2023. Archived from the original on 4 July 2025.
- "Guinea-Bissau appoints new PM after last month's 'attempted coup'". France 24. 21 December 2023. Archived from the original on 4 July 2025.
- "Guiné-Bissau: Geraldo Martins é o novo primeiro-ministro". Voice of America. 7 August 2023. Archived from the original on 4 July 2025.
- "Guiné-Bissau já tem novo Governo com 19 ministérios e 15 secretarias de Estado". Radio France Internationale. 13 August 2023. Archived from the original on 4 July 2025.
- "Sissoco reconduz Geraldo Martins como primeiro-ministro". Deutsche Welle. 12 December 2023. Archived from the original on 4 July 2025.
- Baldé, Mussá (4 December 2023). "Presidente Sissoco Embaló assume pastas do Interior e Defesa". Radio France Internationale. Archived from the original on 4 July 2025.
- Tasamba, James (20 December 2023). "Guinea-Bissau president fires newly appointed prime minister". Anadolu Agency. Archived from the original on 4 July 2025.

=== Web ===
- "Strengthening women's political participation in Guinea". African Development Bank. 29 November 2019. Archived from the original on 10 August 2023.

Political offices
Preceded by Nuno Gomes Nabiam; Acting	Prime Minister of Guinea-Bissau; Acting; 8 August 2023 – 21 December 2023	Succeeded by Rui Duarte de Barros
