= Union for Change =

Political alliance in Guinea-Bissau

The Union for Change (Portuguese: União para a Mudança, UM) is a political alliance in Guinea-Bissau.

== History ==
The UM was established in 1994 as an alliance of six parties; the Democratic Front (FD), the Democratic Party of Progress (PDP), the Democratic Social Front (FDS), the Guinean League for Ecological Protection (LIPE), the Party for Renewal and Development (PRD) and the Unity Movement for Democracy (MUD). It was headed by Amin Michel Saad, the leader of the PDP. In the 1994 general elections the party put forward LIPE's Bubacar Rachid Djaló as its presidential candidate. Djaló finished sixth with 3% of the vote, but in the parliamentary elections the alliance received 13% of the vote and won six seats in the National People's Assembly.

Following the civil war in 1998 and 1999, the FD left the Union to join the Democratic Alliance. The FDS also left the Union to contest the 1999–2000 general elections alone. The elections saw the alliance nominate Djaló as its presidential candidate for a second time. He again received only 3% of the vote, and the party also lost three of its seats in the National People's Assembly. In 2002 LIPE left the Union to join the Electoral Union.

The 2004 parliamentary elections saw the party lose its three remaining seats, and it did not nominate a candidate for the presidential elections in 2005 presidential elections. Prior to the 2008 parliamentary elections the UM joined the wider Alliance of Patriotic Forces coalition, which failed to win a seat in the Assembly. By then MUD and PRD had become inactive.

The alliance did not nominate candidates for the 2009 or 2012 presidential elections, but returned to contest the 2014 parliamentary elections, winning a single seat.

The alliance contested the 2023 legislative election as part of a PAIGC-led coalition, the Inclusive Alliance Platform – Terra Ranka, that won 54 out of the 102 available seats.
