= Democratic Party of Progress =

Political party in Guinea-Bissau

The Democratic Party of Progress (Portuguese: Partido Democrático do Progresso, PDP) is a political party in Guinea-Bissau.

== History ==
The PDP was established on 10 February 1992 by Amin Michel Saad. It joined the Union for Change (UM) alliance prior to the 1994 general elections, and Saad became the UM's leader. The UM won six seats in the National People's Assembly, of which the PDP (though Saad) took one.

The UM was reduced to three seats in the 1999–2000 general elections, and lost them all in the 2004 parliamentary elections. It did not nominate a candidate for the presidential elections in 2005 presidential elections, and prior to the 2008 parliamentary elections the UM joined the wider Alliance of Patriotic Forces coalition, which failed to win a seat in the Assembly.

The UM did not contest the 2009 or 2012 presidential elections, but returned to contest the 2014 general elections, winning one seat in the National People's Assembly.
