= Maria da Conceição Nobre Cabral =

Bissau-Guinean politician

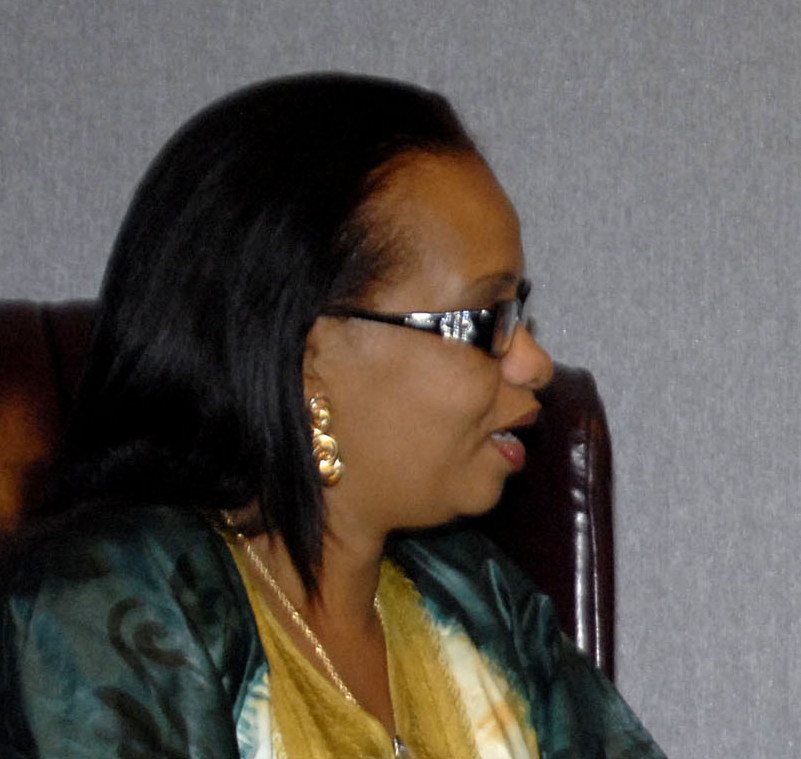
Maria da Conceição Nobre Cabral in 2008

Maria da Conceição Nobre Cabral is a Guinea-Bissauan politician who was Minister of Foreign Affairs from 2007 to 2009.

Cabral was appointed as Foreign Minister on April 18, 2007, as part of the government of Prime Minister Martinho Ndafa Kabi. She was chosen for the post by President Nino Vieira.

Cabral was married to a former ambassador of Guinea-Bissau to the United States. Currently, she is the President of a NGO called Scorpius-Centaurus.

Political offices
| Preceded by António Isaac Monteiro | Foreign Minister of Guinea-Bissau; 2007–2009 | Succeeded by Adiato Djaló Nandigna |
