= Alliance of Patriotic Forces =

Political alliance in Guinea-Bissau

The Alliance of Patriotic Forces (Portuguese: Aliança de Forças Patrioticas, AFP) was a political alliance in Guinea-Bissau. It consisted of the Union for Change (UM), Guinean Civic Forum-Social Democracy (FCG-SD), the Democratic Social Front (FDS) and the Solidarity and Labour Party (PST).

== History ==
The Alliance was formed in September 2008 in order to contest the November 2008 parliamentary elections. However, it received just 1.3% of the vote and failed to win a seat.

It supported Manuel Serifo Nhamadjo in the March 2012 presidential elections. Nhamadjo finished third with 16% of the vote. Following the April 2012 coup the FCG-SD and the FDS joined the pro-coup Opposition Democratic Forum, whilst the PST joined the National Anti-Coup Front.
