= 2022 in Guinea-Bissau =

- Decades: 2000s; 2010s; 2020s
- See also: Other events of 2022; Timeline of Guinea-Bissauan history

Events in the year 2022 in Guinea-Bissau.

== Incumbents ==
- President: Umaro Sissoco Embaló
- Prime Minister: Nuno Gomes Nabiam

== Events ==
Ongoing — COVID-19 pandemic in Guinea-Bissau

- 1 February 2022 : A coup d'état to oust Embaló was attempted on 1 February 2022. He said that "many" members of the security forces had been killed in a "failed attack against democracy."

== Deaths ==
- 1 February 2022 :
