= Socialist Party of Guinea-Bissau =

Political party in Guinea-Bissau

- Founded: 1994
- Ideology: Socialism
- Political position: Left-wing

The Socialist Party of Guinea-Bissau (Portuguese: Partido Socialista da Guiné-Bissau, PSGB) is a political party in Guinea-Bissau.

== History ==
The party was established in 1994 following the general elections that year, but did not contest any elections until a decade later. It joined the Electoral Union in 2002, In the 2004 parliamentary elections it received just 0.3% of the vote, failing to win a seat in the National People's Assembly. The 2008 parliamentary elections saw it receive only 639 votes (0.14%) as it again failed to win a seat.

In the 2014 general elections, the party nominated a presidential candidate for the first time. Cirilo Rodrigues de Oliveira received just 0.3% of the vote in the presidential elections, finishing last in a field of 13 candidates, whilst the party received 0.6% of the vote in the parliamentary elections, remaining seatless.
