= 2012 in Guinea-Bissau =

- Decades: 1990s; 2000s; 2010s; 2020s
- See also: Other events of 2012; Timeline of Guinea-Bissauan history

The following lists events that happened during 2012 in Guinea-Bissau.

== Incumbents ==
- President:
  - until 9 January: Malam Bacai Sanhá
  - 9 January-12 April: Adiato Djaló Nandigna (acting)
  - 12 April-11 May: Mamadu Ture Kuruma
  - starting 11 May: Manuel Serifo Nhamadjo
- Prime Minister:
  - until 10 February: Carlos Gomes Júnior
  - 10 February-12 April: Adiato Djaló Nandigna
  - 12 April-16 May: vacant
  - starting 16 May: Rui Duarte de Barros

== Events ==
=== January ===
- January 9 - President Malam Bacai Sanhá dies at the age of 64 while undergoing treatment for an unknown ailment in Paris.

=== March ===
- March 18 - Voters in Guinea-Bissau go to the polls for a presidential election following the death of President Malam Bacai Sanhá in January.

=== April ===
- April 13 - The Economic Community of West African States condemns an apparent coup d'état in Guinea-Bissau.
- April 16 - Military leaders and a group of political parties in Guinea-Bissau announce the formation of a Transitional National Council after the recent coup; the acting president and prime minister remain in detention.
- April 17 - Guinea-Bissau is suspended from the African Union one week after a coup d'état.
- April 20 - The Economic Community of West African States condemns the election plan of the military junta which seized power in Guinea-Bissau.

=== October ===
- October 21 - A firefight in Guinea-Bissau kills six people.
