= Unity Movement for Democracy =

The Unity Movement for Democracy (Portuguese: Movimento de Unidade para a Democracia, MUD) was a political party in Guinea-Bissau.

== History ==
The MUD was established on 6 June 1990 by Filinto Vaz Martins, a former member of the ruling PAIGC, and was the second party established after multi-party democracy was introduced. It joined the Union for Change alliance, which won six seats in the 1994 general elections, although MUD did not receive any of the seats.

The Union for Change was reduced to three seats in the 1999–2000 general elections, and lost them all in the 2004 parliamentary elections, after which the MUD became inactive.
