= Hilia Barber =

Bissau-Guinean politician

- Occupation: Politician
- Known for: First female Minister of Foreign Affairs in 1999

Hilia Barber is a Bissau-Guinean politician who served as the country's first female Minister of Foreign Affairs in 1999. She has also served as the country's ambassador to France and Israel.

== Career ==
Hilia Barber has a long history in the foreign service. She was chief of the Guinea-Bissau Ministry of Foreign Affairs' Europe-America department in 1982. In this role Barber was part of a delegation sent to Cuba to negotiate technical assistance, international scholarships and military training. She presented her credentials to President of Israel Ezer Weizman on 17 April 1996. Barber was the first ambassador to Israel from Guinea-Bissau. Whilst serving in this role, in July 1998 she successfully sought humanitarian aid from the Israeli government to help alleviate suffering as a result of the Guinea-Bissau Civil War.

In early 1999 Barber was appointed Minister of Foreign Affairs, the first woman to serve in that role. She was replaced by José Pereira Baptista later that same year. By 2013 Barber had become Guinea-Bissau's ambassador to France.
