= 2025 in Guinea-Bissau =

- Decades: 2000s; 2010s; 2020s
- See also: Other events of 2025; Timeline of Guinea-Bissauan history

Events in the year 2025 in Guinea-Bissau.

== Incumbents ==
- President: Umaro Sissoco Embaló (until 26 November); High Military Command for the Restoration of Order (since 26 November, led by Horta Inta-A Na Man since 27 November)
- Prime Minister: Rui Duarte de Barros (until 7 August); Braima Camará (until 26 November); Ilídio Vieira Té (since 28 November)

== Events ==
=== February ===
- 25 February – President Umaro Sissoco Embaló announces an agreement between the Senegalese government and the Movement of Democratic Forces of Casamance to end the Casamance conflict following talks hosted and mediated by Guinea-Bissau.

=== March ===
- 1 March – The ECOWAS mission departs Guinea-Bissau after President Embalo threatens to expel it.
- 3 March – President Embaló announces he will run for a second term in November, backtracking on a previous pledge to step down.

=== July ===
- 13 July – The Bijagós Islands are designated as a World Heritage Site by UNESCO.

=== August ===
- 7 August – President Embalo dismisses Rui Duarte de Barros as prime minister and replaces him with Braima Camará.
- 15 August – The government orders the expulsion of several Portuguese journalists for undisclosed reasons.

=== October ===
- 31 October – The government announces the arrest of several military officers on suspicion of planning a coup.

=== November ===
- 23 November – 2025 Guinea-Bissau general election: Both incumbent president Umaro Sissoco Embaló and Fernando Dias da Costa claim victory in the presidential election.
- 26 November – President Embaló is arrested in a coup d'état carried out by the army chief of staff. The military then establishes a High Military Command for the Restoration of Order to lead the country.
- 27 November –
  - The High Military Command for the Restoration of Order proclaims army chief of staff General Horta Inta-A Na Man as head of a military government that would oversee a one-year transition period.
  - Guinea-Bissau is suspended from ECOWAS over the coup.
- 28 November –
  - The High Military Command for the Restoration of Order appoints finance minister Ilídio Vieira Té as prime minister.
  - Guinea-Bissau is suspended from the African Union over the coup.
- 29 November – The High Military Command for the Restoration of Order unveils a new cabinet.

=== December ===
- 2 December – The National Electoral Commission announces that it is unable to publish the results of the 2025 Guinea-Bissau general election after armed men destroy all tally sheets except for those from Bissau.
- 12 December – Protests erupt in Bissau against the 2025 Guinea-Bissau coup d'état, with demonstrators calling for the release of detained opposition leaders and rejecting the military junta.

== Holidays ==
- 1 January – New Year's Day
- 20 January – Heroes' Day
- 8 March – International Women's Day
- 30 March – Korité
- 1 May – Labour Day
- 6 June – Tabaski
- 3 August – Pidjiguiti Day
- 24 September – National Day
- 14 November – Readjustment Movement Day
- 25 December – Christmas Day
