= Party for Renewal and Development =

Political Party in Guinea-Bissau

The Party for Renewal and Development (Portuguese: Partido para Renovação e Desenvolvimento, PRD) was a political party in Guinea-Bissau.

== History ==
The PRD was established on 12 February 1992 by dissidents from the Group of 121 who had been urging reform of the ruling PAIGC, and was initially led by João da Costa. It joined the Union for Change alliance prior to the 1994 general elections, with the Alliance winning six seats in the National People's Assembly, of which the PRD took one.

Following the death of da Costa, Manuel Rambout Barcellos became party leader. The Union was reduced to three seats in the 1999–2000 general elections, and lost them all in the 2004 parliamentary elections, after which the PRD became inactive.
