= Vice President of Guinea-Bissau =

The vice president of Guinea-Bissau (Portuguese: Vice-presidente da Guiné-Bissau) is a former political position in Guinea-Bissau. The position was established in September 1973, and abolished in December 1991.

== List of officeholders ==
Political parties

African Party for the Independence of Guinea and Cape Verde (PAIGC)

Portrait	Name (Birth–Death)	Term of Office		Political party	President	Notes
Vice Presidents of the Council of State
	Umaru Djaló (1940–2014)	September 1973	13 March 1977	PAIGC	Luís Cabral	
	João Bernardo Vieira (1939–2009)	13 March 1977	28 September 1978	PAIGC	Luís Cabral	
	Umaru Djaló (1940–2014)	28 September 1978	November 1980	PAIGC	Luís Cabral	
	Victor Saúde Maria (1939–1999)	November 1980	March 1984	PAIGC	João Bernardo Vieira	
First Vice Presidents of the Council of State
	Paulo Correia (1942–1986)	May 1984	November 1985	PAIGC	João Bernardo Vieira	
	Iafai Camará (–)	7 November 1985	December 1991	PAIGC	João Bernardo Vieira	
Second Vice Presidents of the Council of State
	Iafai Camará (–)	May 1984	November 1985	PAIGC	João Bernardo Vieira	
	Manuel dos Santos 'Manecas' (born 1942)	April 1987	June 1989	PAIGC	João Bernardo Vieira	
	Vasco Cabral (1926–2005)	21 June 1989	December 1991	PAIGC	João Bernardo Vieira	

== See also ==
- List of presidents of Guinea-Bissau
- List of prime ministers of Guinea-Bissau
