= Juliano Fernandes =

Bissau-Guinean

Interior Minister
- In office July 2019 – February 2020

Personal details
- Born: Juliano Augusto Fernandes; 24 October 1959 (age 66) Guinea Bissau
- Party: Assembly of the People United
- Education: University of Lisbon

Juliano Augusto Fernandes (born 24 October 1959) is a Bissau-Guinean lawyer, university professor, and politician.
