= 2021 in Guinea-Bissau =

- Decades: 2000s; 2010s; 2020s
- See also: Other events of 2021; Timeline of Guinea-Bissauan history

Events in the year 2021 in Guinea-Bissau.

== Incumbents ==
- President: Umaro Sissoco Embaló
- Prime Minister: Nuno Gomes Nabiam

== Events ==
Ongoing — COVID-19 pandemic in Guinea-Bissau

== Deaths ==
- 10 March – Manuel Saturnino da Costa, politician, prime minister (born 1942).
- 31 March – Carlos Pedro Zilli, 66, Brazilian-born Bissau-Guinean Roman Catholic prelate, bishop of Roman Catholic Diocese of Bafatá (since 2001); COVID-19.
