= Suzi Barbosa =

Bissau-Guinean politician

Suzi Carla Barbosa
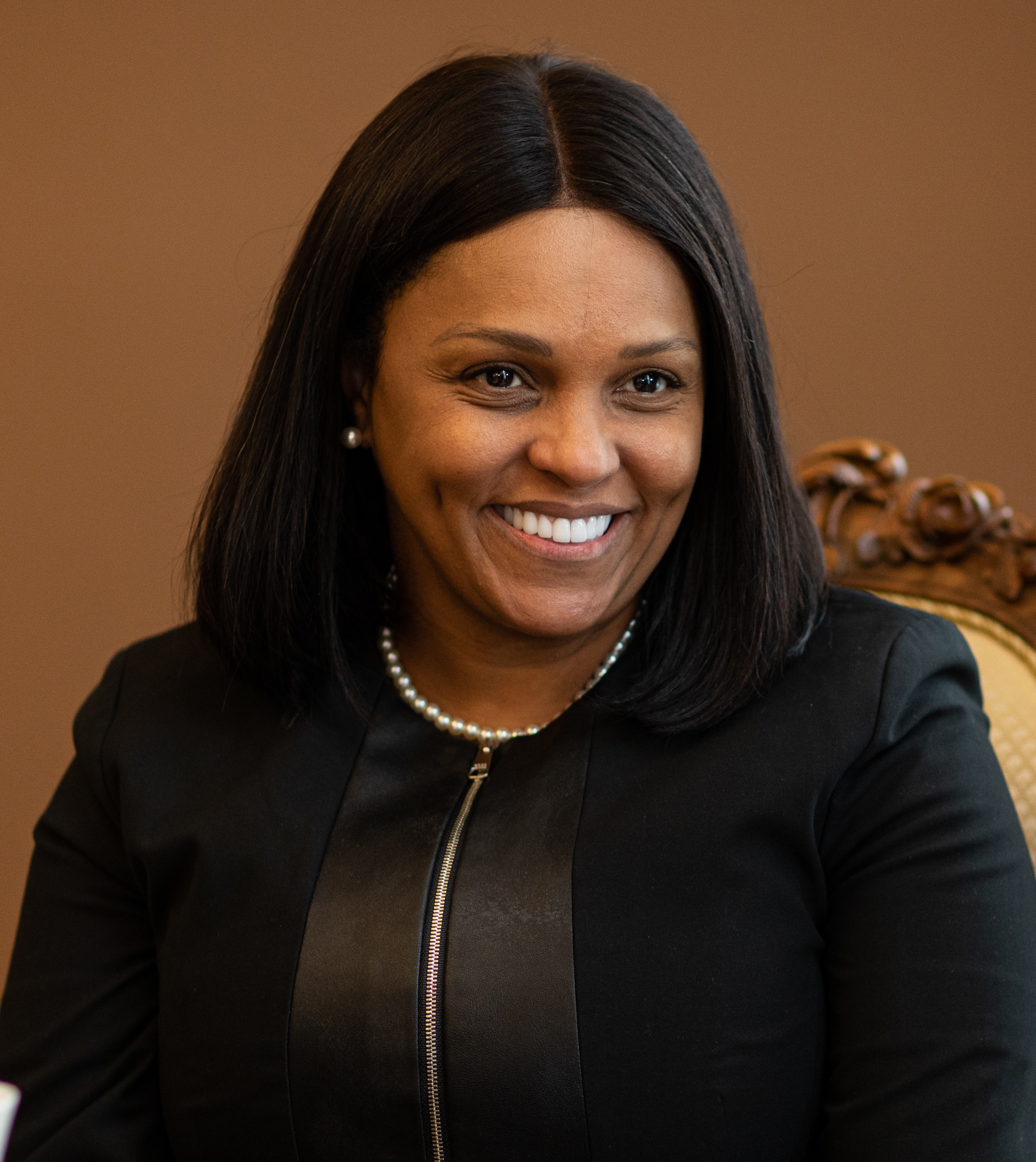
- Suzi Barbosa, 2023

Minister of Foreign Affairs
- In office 3 July 2019 – 8 August 2023
- President: [[José Mário Vaz and Umaro Sissoco Embaló]]
- Preceded by: João Butiam Có
- Succeeded by: Carlos Pinto Pereira

Personal details
- Born: July 5, 1973 (age 53) Bafatá, Guinea-Bissau
- Party: Madem G15 (since 2022); PAIGC (before 2022)
- Children: =

Suzi Barbosa is a Bissau-Guinean politician, who is currently board member of the Spain África Strategic Council, since 2025. She was former Special Adviser of the President of the Republic Umaro Sissoco Embaló, for Foreign Affairs, from 2023 to 2024. She was Senior Minister and Minister of Foreign Affairs from 2019 to 2023 and was appointed Minister 4 times. Before she Secretary of State for International Cooperation, from 2015 to 2016. Before she was Diplomatic and Political Adviser for the Prime Minister Aristides Gomes, from 2018 to 2019. She was member of parliament elected 3 times and also Chair of the Women Parliamentarians Network of Guinea-Bissau.She is also PhD student in African Studies in Portugal. In 2025, she was decorated by the Spanish government with the Order of Merit "Isabel la Católica"

== Career ==
Barbosa is an advocate for the participation of women in the national political affairs of Guinea-Bissau. She was part of the feminist movement in Guinea-Bissau among women from Bafatá Region who avoided voting in elections if women were not featured on the contestants list. She indicated that "Guinea-Bissau has a population mostly made up of women and it is very sad to see that they do not have the same opportunities as men, especially in decision-making positions, if they had perhaps the country's situation in terms of stability would have been different”.

She was a delegate at the first conference of Women's Circle of the National Assembly in Quebec City in 2017, made up of politicians from French speaking countries, gathered to build capacity for female world leaders.

As of 2016, she was the Secretary of State for International Cooperation and Communities in Guinea-Bissau.

On July 3, 2019, she became Minister of Foreign Affairs.

She was the decorated in 2023 with the National Medal Colinas de Boé by His Excellency President Umaro Sissoco Embaló.
