= Universidade Colinas de Boé =

Private university in Guinea-Bissau

Coordinates: 11.8815°N 15.6407°W

- Type: Private
- Established: September 2003
- Location: Safim, Guinea-Bissau
- Campus: Urban
- Nickname: UCB

The Universidade Colinas de Boé (UCB) is a private institution of higher education in Guinea-Bissau. It was founded in September 2003 and the first university in Guinea-Bissau, just before the creation of the Universidade Amílcar Cabral, the only public university in the country. In 2007, it established a cooperation agreement with the Polytechnic Institute of Leiria (IPL).
