= Carlos Pinto Pereira =

Bissau-Guinean politician

Minister of Foreign Affairs
- In office 13 August 2023 – 2025
- President: Umaro Sissoco Embaló
- Preceded by: Suzi Barbosa
- Succeeded by: João Bernardo Vieira II

Personal details
- Born: 1 February 1957 (age 69) Bissau

Carlos Pinto Pereira is a Guinea-Bissau politician who has served as Minister of Foreign Affairs from 13 August 2023 to 2025. He is also minister of International Cooperation and Communities.

== Career ==
Pinto Peirara studied law at the University of Lisbon and, after graduating, completed postgraduate studies in international law there. After his studies, he worked as a lawyer and in public administration.

He is a member of the political bureau of the African Independence Party of Guinea and Cape Verde (PAIGC). From 2000 to 2001, he was Minister of Public Administration and Labour, and from 2001 to 2002, Minister of Justice. On 13 August 2023, he was appointed by President Umaro Sissoco Embaló as Minister of Foreign Affairs, International Cooperation and Communities in the government of Geraldo Martins. He retained the post under subsequent prime ministers and was most recently confirmed by the President on 11 August 2025 in the new government of Braima Camará.
