= Minister of Finance (Guinea-Bissau) =

Minister of Finance of Guinea-Bissau

Minister of Finance of Guinea-Bissau is a government minister in charge of the Ministry of Finance of Guinea-Bissau, which is responsible for the public finances of the country.

== Ministers responsible for finance ==
- Vasco Cabral, 1973-1975
- Carlos Correia, 1975-1981
- Victor Freire Monteiro, 1982-1984-1986-1990
- Manuel dos Santos 'Manecas', 1990-1991-?
- Filinto de Barros, 1992-1994
- Rui Dia de Sousa, 1994-1996-?
- Issuf Sanhá, 1997-1998
- Abubacar Demba Dahaba, 1998
- Rui Duarte de Barros, 1998-2000
- Purna Bia, 2000-2001
- Faustino Imbali, 2001
- Rui Duarte de Barros, 2001-2003
- Abubacar Demba Dahaba, 2003
- Augusto Ussumane So, 2003-2004
- João Fadiá, 2004-2005
- Victor Mandinga, 2005-2007
- Issuf Sanhá, 2007-2009
- José Mário Vaz, 2009-2012
- Abubacar Demba Dahaba, 2012-2013
- Gino Mendes, 2013-2014
- Geraldo Martins, 2014-2015
- Geraldo Martins, 2015-2016
- Henrique Horta dos Santos, 2016
- João Fadiá, 2016-2018
- Aristides Gomes, 2018-2019
- Victor Mandinga, 2019
- Geraldo Martins, 2019-2020
- João Fadiá, 2020-2023
- Ilídio Vieira Té, 2023

== See also ==
- Economy of Guinea-Bissau
