= 2010 in Guinea-Bissau =

- Decades: 1990s; 2000s; 2010s; 2020s
- See also: Other events of 2010; Timeline of Guinea-Bissauan history

The following lists events that happened during 2010 in the Republic of Guinea-Bissau.

== Incumbents ==
- President: Malam Bacai Sanhá
- Prime Minister: Carlos Gomes Júnior

== Events ==
=== April ===
- April 1 - 2010 Guinea-Bissau military unrest

=== November ===
- November 23 - United Nations Security Council Resolution 1949
