= 2024 in Guinea-Bissau =

- Decades: 2000s; 2010s; 2020s
- See also: Other events of 2024; Timeline of Guinea-Bissauan history

Events in the year 2024 in Guinea-Bissau.

== Incumbents ==
- President: Umaro Sissoco Embaló
- Prime Minister: Rui Duarte de Barros

== Events ==
- 7 September – Police seize 2.63 of cocaine from an aircraft that landed at Osvaldo Vieira International Airport in Bissau from Venezuela. The five crew are arrested.

== Holidays ==
- 1 January - New Year's Day
- 20 January - Heroes' Day
- 8 March - International Women's Day
- 10 April - Korité
- 1 May - Labour Day
- 16 June – Tabaski
- 3 August - Pidjiguiti Day
- 24 September – National day
- 14 November - Readjustment Movement Day
- 25 December - Christmas Day
