= Vasco Cabral =

Bissau-Guinean writer and politician

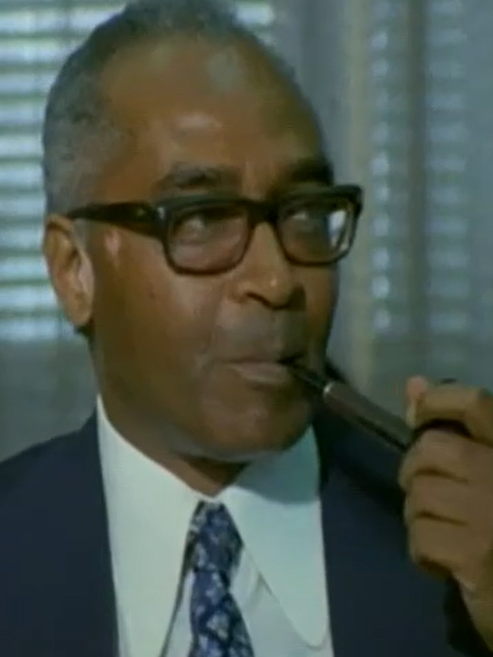
- Cabral in 1975

Second Vice President of Guinea-Bissau
- In office 21 June 1989 – December 1991
- President: João Bernardo Vieira
- Preceded by: Iafai Camará
- Succeeded by: Position abolished

Personal details
- Born: António Vasco da Costa Rebelo Cabral; 23 August 1926 Farim, Portuguese Guinea
- Died: 24 August 2005 (aged 79)
- Party: PAIGC

Vasco Cabral (1926–2005) was a Bissau-Guinean writer and politician.

He was minister of economy and finance and planning from 1974 to 1982. He was also minister of justice, and Second Vice President of Guinea-Bissau from 21 June 1989 to December 1991.

Cabral was born on 23 August 1926 in Farim, northern part of the country. He studied at the Technical University of Lisbon and was imprisoned in 1953 for opposing António de Oliveira Salazar's regime. He was one of the founders of PAIGC (African Party for the Independence of Guinea and Cape Verde). He published a book of poems in 1981, and was the founder and first president of national union of artists and writers of Guinea Bissau. He was married to Barbara Matos. He died in Bissau.

== Works ==
- A luta é a minha primavera, 1981 (poetry)

== Bibliography ==
- Alonso Romo, Eduardo J., Literatura africana de lengua portuguesa (in Spanish), Revista Espéculo n.º 40, 2008, Universidad Complutense de Madrid.
