= Patriotic Front of National Salvation =

Patriotic Front for National Salvation Frente Patriótica de Salvação Nacional
- President: Baciro Djá
- Founded: 2018
- Ideology: Democratic socialism
- Political position: Center-left to the left

The Patriotic Front for National Salvation (Portuguese: Frente Patriótica de Salvação Nacional (FREPASNA) is a political party in Guinea-Bissau founded in 2018 by former Prime Minister Baciro Djá.

== History ==
FREPASNA was created in 2018 by Baciro Djá. In March 2019, in its first electoral showing, it obtained 13,926 votes (fourth most voted) but failed to obtain seats in the National People's Assembly. Also in the same year, the party president Baciro Djá was nominated for the presidential elections and obtained 1.28% of the votes, being eliminated in the first round of elections.

== See also ==
- List of political parties in Guinea-Bissau
