= António Isaac Monteiro =

Bissau-Guinean politician

António Isaac Monteiro is the former foreign minister of Guinea-Bissau. He was in that position from 9 November 2005 to 17 April 2007, in the government of Prime Minister Aristides Gomes. He was previously the Minister of Development.

Preceded by Soares Sambu	Foreign Minister of Guinea-Bissau; 2005-2007	Succeeded by Maria da Conceição Nobre Cabral
