= 2009 in Guinea-Bissau =

- Decades: 1980s; 1990s; 2000s; 2010s; 2020s
- See also: Other events of 2009; Timeline of Guinea-Bissauan history

Events in the year 2009 in Guinea-Bissau.

== Incumbents ==
- President:
  - until 2 March: João Bernardo Vieira
  - 3 March-8 September: Raimundo Pereira
  - starting 8 September: Malam Bacai Sanhá
- Prime Minister: Carlos Correia (until 2 January), Carlos Gomes Júnior (starting 2 January)

== Events ==
- June 28 and July 26 - Guinea-Bissau presidential election, 2009

== Sports ==
Guinea-Bissau was at the Lusophony Games: Guinea-Bissau at the 2009 Lusophony Games.

== Deaths ==
- March 1 - Batista Tagme Na Waie, Army chief of staff
- March 2 - João Bernardo Vieira, President of Guinea-Bissau
- May 30 - Luís Cabral, former President of Guinea-Bissau
