= Botche Candé =

Bissau-Guinean politician

Minister of Interior
- In office 28 February 2020 – 26 November 2025
- Preceded by: Juliano Fernandes
- Succeeded by: Mamasaliu Embaló

Botche Candé (born 18 July 1955) is a Guinean Bissauan politician. Since 2020, he has been Minister of Interior in the government of prime minister Nuno Nabiam of Guinea Bissau. He was arrested during the 2025 Guinea-Bissau coup d'état on 26 November.
