= Electoral Union =

Political alliance in Guinea-Bissau

The Electoral Union (Portuguese: União Eleitoral, UE) was a political alliance in Guinea-Bissau.

== History ==
The UE was established in 2002 as an alliance of the Guinean League for Ecological Protection (LIPE), the Party of Renewal and Progress (PRP), the Social Democratic Party (PSD) and the Socialist Party (PSGB), as well as a dissident faction of the Resistance of Guinea-Bissau-Bafatá Movement. It was initially headed by Joaquim Baldé of the PSD, but was designed to have a rotating presidency.

The Union received 4% of the vote in the 2004 parliamentary elections, winning two seats. It supported PAIGC candidate Malam Bacai Sanhá in the 2005 presidential elections, which were won by João Bernardo Vieira.

Leadership crises prevented the party from contesting elections in 2008 and 2009, after which it was dissolved.
