= Inclusive Alliance Platform – Terra Ranka =

Political coalition in Guinea-Bissau

Inclusive Alliance Platform – Terra Ranka Plataforma Aliança Inclusiva – Terra Ranka
- Abbreviation: PAI-Terra Ranka
- Leader: Domingos Simões Pereira
- Founder: Domingos Simões Pereira
- Founded: 3 April 2023
- Ideology: Social democracy; Pan-Africanism
- Political position: Centre-left
- Coalition members: PAIGC; UM; PCD; MDG other small parties
- Colors: Red, green and yellow
- Seats in the National People's Assembly: 54 / 102

The Inclusive Alliance Platform – Terra Ranka (PAI – Terra Ranka; Portuguese: Plataforma Aliança Inclusiva; Guinea-Bissau Creole: Terra Ranka, lit. 'the country starts') is a Bissau-Guinean political coalition formed for the 2023 legislative election and mainly led by the African Party for the Independence of Guinea and Cape Verde (PAICG).

== History ==
The Inclusive Alliance Platform – Terra Ranka (PAI-Terra Ranka) was formed in April 2023 by the African Party for the Independence of Guinea and Cape Verde (PAICG) and four other parties - the Union for Change (UM), the Democratic Convergence Party (PCD), the Social Democratic Party (PSD) and the Guinean Democratic Movement (MDG) — in view of the 2023 legislative election. The coalition relies on the "Terra Ranka" program, a set of measures proposed since 2014 by the PAICG for the development of Guinea-Bissau.

At the beginning of May, the coalition is approved by the electoral commission to participate in the elections and takes as its symbol a house which takes up the colors of the PAICG.

On 19 May 2023, the coalition signed a coalition agreement integrating eighteen minor political parties that were unable to stand in the legislative elections in order to broaden its electoral base.

In the 2023 legislative election, the coalition tops the ballot and wins an absolute majority with 54 seats in the National People's Assembly. President Umaro Sissoco Embaló admitted his defeat after the announcement of the provisional results on 8 June. He congratulated the PAI-Terra Ranka coalition and announced his decision to appoint the leader of the PAIGC, Domingos Simões Pereira, to the post of Prime Minister, agreeing to reconsider his declarations of rejection of this option during the electoral campaign.
