= Guinean League for Ecological Protection =

Political party in Guinea-Bissau

The Guinean League for Ecological Protection (Portuguese: Liga Guineense para a Protecção Ecológica, LIPE) is a political party in Guinea-Bissau.

== History ==
The party was established on 20 July 1991 by Bubácar Rachid Djaló, and was legalised on 8 September 1993. In 1994 it joined the Union for Change, an alliance formed to contest the 1994 general elections. Djaló was the Union's presidential candidate, but received only 3% of the vote. However, the UM did win six seats in the National People's Assembly.

The 1999–2000 elections saw the UM lose three seats. Djaló remained the alliance's presidential candidate, but again received only 3% of the vote. Following the Union's support for the victorious Kumba Ialá in the run-off election, Djaló became Secretary of State for Commerce.

In 2002 LIPE left the UM and joined the Electoral Union (UE) alliance, which won two seats in the 2004 parliamentary elections. The UE was dissolved prior to the 2008 parliamentary elections and LIPE ran alone, receiving just 233 votes (0.05%). The party's application to contest the 2014 general elections was rejected by the Supreme Court.
