= Antonieta Rosa Gomes =

Bissau-Guinean politician

Antonieta Rosa Gomes (born May 4, 1959, in Bissau) is a Bissau-Guinean politician.

Founder and leader of the Guinean Civic Forum–Social Democracy, Gomes was educated in Brazil, receiving her law degree from the University of São Paulo. She served under Kumba Ialá as the Minister of Justice and the Minister of Foreign Affairs at various points. She stood as a candidate in the presidential elections of 1994, 1999, and 2005. She was the first and only woman to do so, but she never received more than 2% of the vote. Her ouster as Minister of Foreign Affairs is considered a major factor in the events leading to the 2003 coup d'état which ousted Ialá from power. In 2004, she served as president of the commission of the Supreme Tribunal of Justice. She ran for president in 2005 on the FCG ticket with the affiliation with Social Democracy. She was the only woman in the election. The Fórum Cívico Guineense-Social Democracia no longer appeared in the parliamentary elections on November 16, 2008, and April 13, 2014. She also refrained from renewed candidacy in the presidential elections on June 28, 2009, March 18, 2012, and April 13, 2014.
