= Guinean Democratic Movement =

Political party in Guinea-Bissau

The Guinean Democratic Movement (Portuguese: Movimento Democrático Guineense) is a political party in Guinea-Bissau.

== History ==
The party was established on 14 February 2003 and was led by Silvestre Alves. In the 2004 parliamentary elections it received 0.98% of the vote, failing to win a seat in the National People's Assembly. The 2008 elections saw the party's vote share fall to just 0.14%, again failing to win a seat.

Alves openly condemned the increasingly repressive actions of the Military Command following the 2012 military coup, and in October 2012 was arrested and severely beaten, requiring intensive care in hospital. The party's application to contest the 2014 general elections was rejected by the Supreme Court.

The alliance contested the 2023 legislative election as part of a PAIGC-led coalition, the Inclusive Alliance Platform – Terra Ranka, that won 54 out of the 102 available seats.
