= João Fadiá =

Bissau-Guinean economist and politician

João Aladje Mamadu Fadia (born 4 January 1957) is a Bissau-Guinean economist and politician who served as Minister of Finance from 2020 to 2023.
