= Democratic Social Front =

Political party in Guinea-Bissau

The Democratic Social Front (Portuguese: Frente Democrática Social, FDS) is a political party in Guinea-Bissau.

== History ==
The party was established in March 1990 by Rafael Paula Barbosa, a founder and the first President of the ruling African Party for the Independence of Guinea and Cape Verde. It was part of the Union for Change alliance for the 1994 elections. Although the alliance won six seats, the FDS did not take any. It contested the 1999 parliamentary elections alone, winning two seats.

The 2004 parliamentary elections as part of the United Platform alliance, which failed to win a seat. The party also failed to win a seat in the 2014 elections, receiving just 1,643 votes (0.3%).
