= João Bernardo Vieira II =

Guinea-Bissauan politician (born 1977)

João Bernardo Vieira II, born in Bissau on August 17, 1977, is the Secretary of State for Transport and Communications of Guinea-Bissau and the spokesperson of the biggest party in Guinea-Bissau.

== Early life and education ==
João Bernardo Vieira was named after his uncle João Bernardo Vieira who served as President of Guinea-Bissau from 1980 to 1998 and later 2005 to 2009. Vieira has a law degree from Universidade Lusídas Lisboa, Portugal and holds a master's degree in Sustainable International Development from Brandeis University, where he served as President of the Graduate Students Association. He was awarded a certificate of Emerging Leaders Program in Executive Education from Harvard Kennedy School and an Archbishop Desmond Tutu Leadership Fellowship in South Africa.

== Career ==
In 2004, Vieira began his career in public service in Guinea-Bissau by serving as the Head of Multilateral Agreements in the Ministry of Trade. In this capacity he represented Guinea-Bissau in the multilateral trade negotiations of the World Trade Organization.

He took courses in Geneva offered to students from Least Developed Countries. In 2011 after a national contest, he was selected out of a pool of 50 Bissau-Guineeans to serve as a member of the board of National Regulatory Authority, an organization responsible to regulate the telecom and the internet sector where he served for 3 years.

== Secretary of State for Transport and Communications ==
In May 2014 he contributed to party's landslide victory. In July he was sworn in as Secretary of State for Transport and Communications, the youngest member (Kodé) of the government.

== Gallery ==
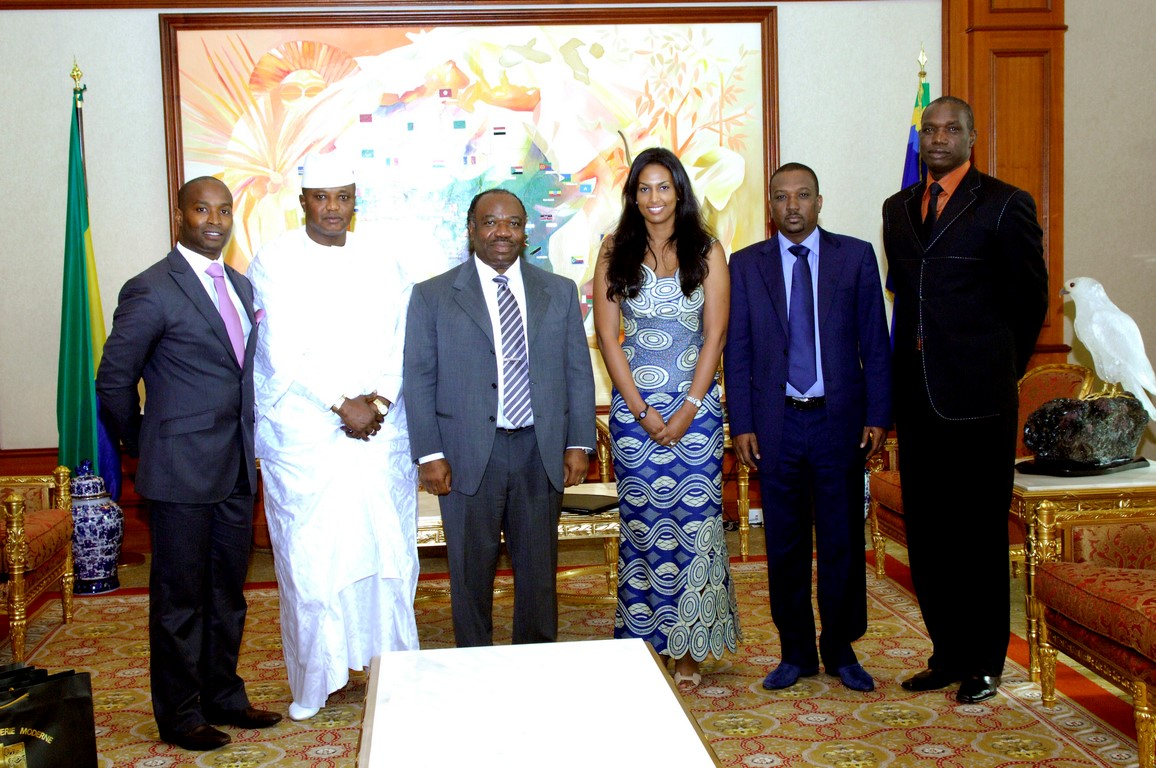
João Bernardo Vieira II

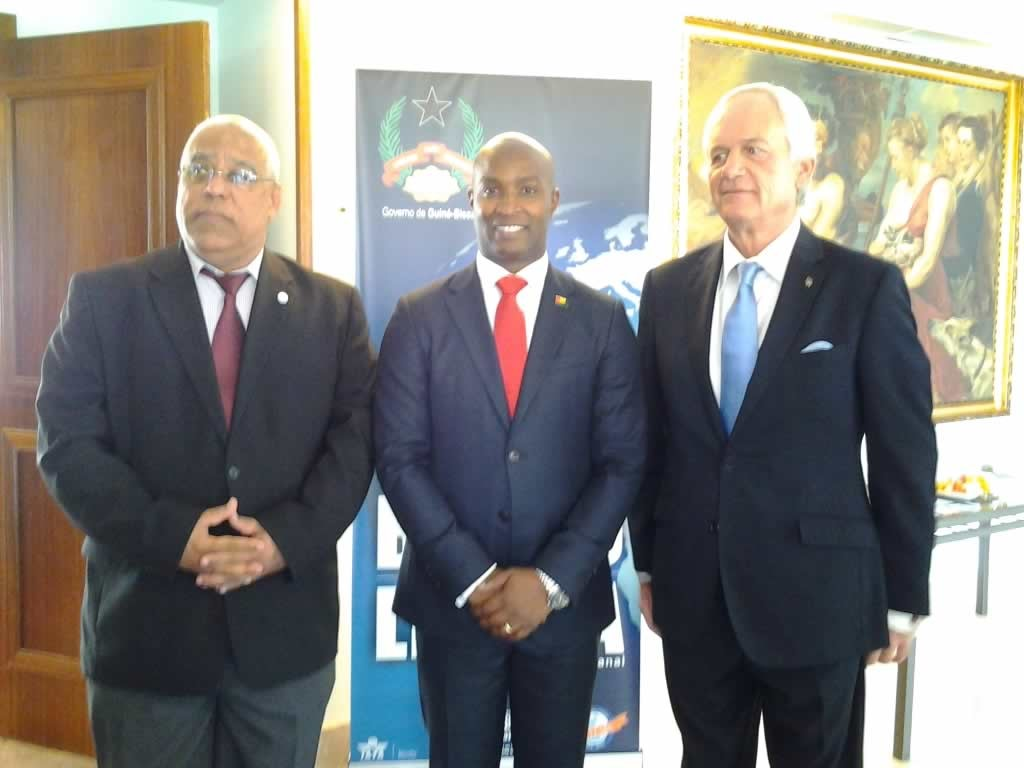
João Bernardo Vieira II

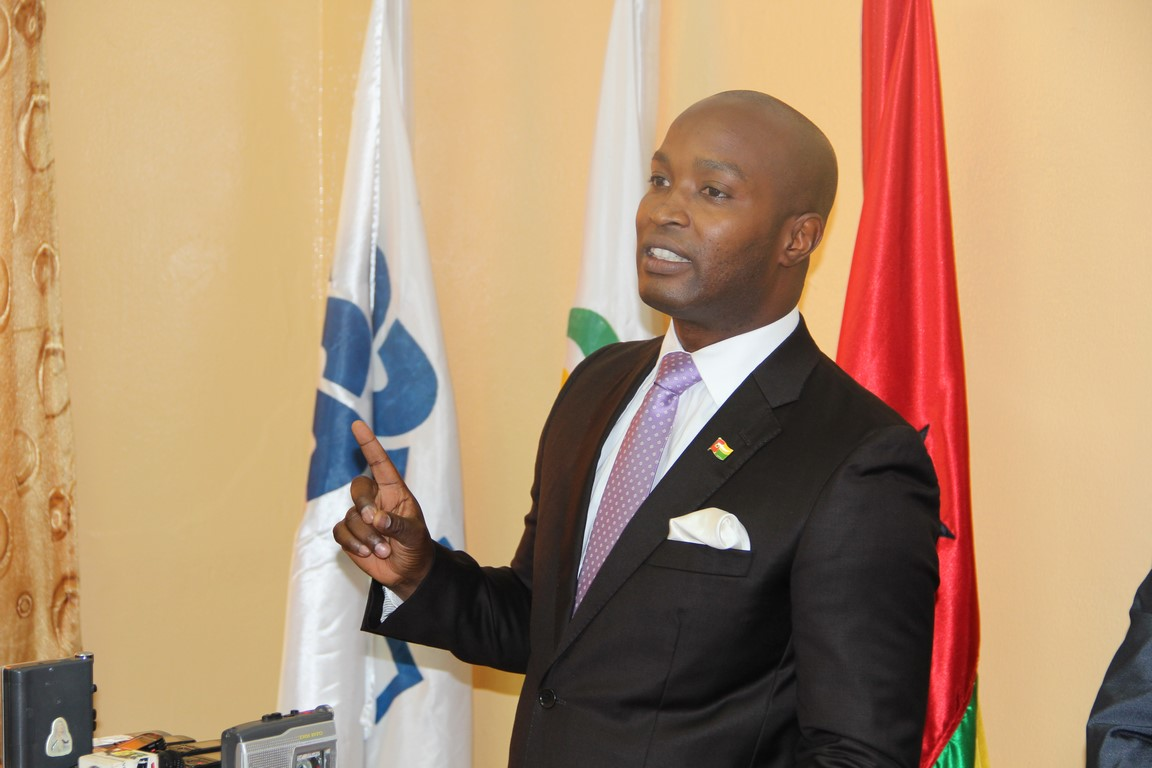
João Bernardo Vieira II

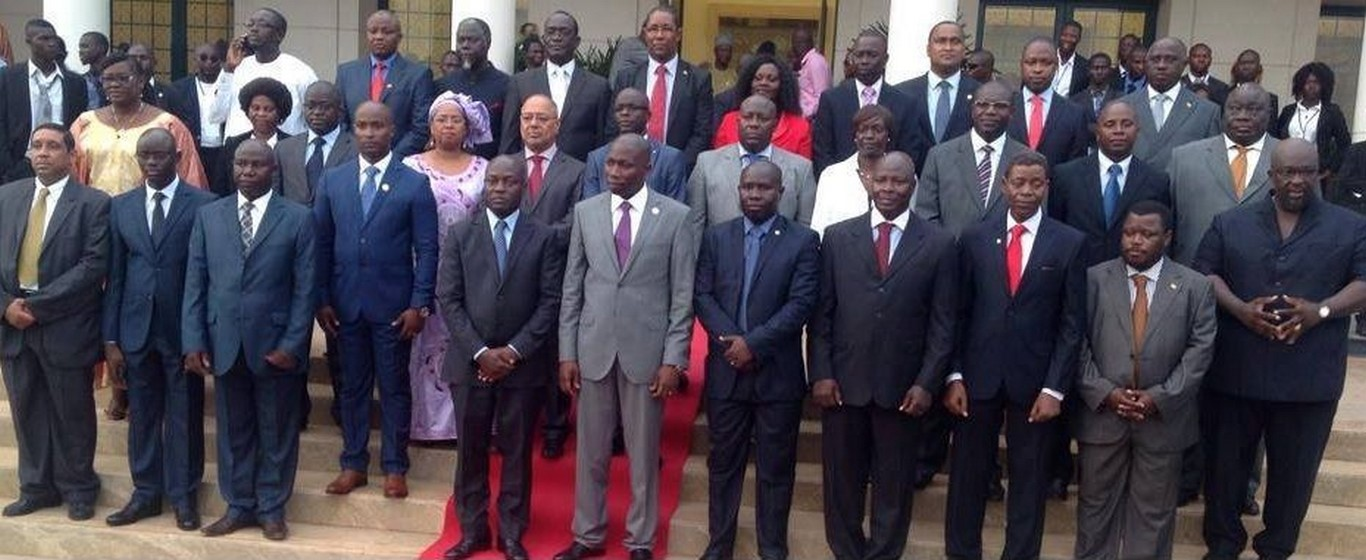
New governmental staff of Guinea-Bissau
