= Assembly of the People United =

Bissau-Guinean political party

Assembly of the People United - Democratic Party of Guinea-Bissau Assembleia do povo Unido - Partido Democrático da Guiné-Bissau
- Leader: Nuno Gomes Nabiam
- Secretary-General: Julio Fernandes
- Founded: 2014
- Split from: PAIGC
- Headquarters: Bissau
- Ideology: Social democracy
- Political position: Centre-left
- Seats in the National People's Assembly: 1 / 102

The Assembly of the People United–Democratic Party of Guinea-Bissau (Portuguese: Assembleia do Povo Unido - Partido Democrático da Guiné-Bissau, APU-PDGB) is a political party in Guinea-Bissau.

== History ==
The party was established in November 2014 by Nuno Gomes Nabiam following the April–May 2014 general elections, in which he was runner-up in the presidential contest. Prior to the 2019 parliamentary elections the party signed a coalition agreement with the African Party for the Independence of Guinea and Cape Verde. It went on to receive 8.5% of the vote and won five seats in the National People's Assembly.

== Election results ==
=== National People's Assembly ===
Election	Votes	%	Seats	+/–	Position	Status
2019	51,049	8.47%	5 / 102	New	▲4th	Opposition (2019-2020)
2019	51,049	8.47%	5 / 102	New	▲4th	Coalition (2020-2023)
2023	29,787	4.44%	1 / 102	▼4	▼5th	TBA
