= Baciro Djá =

Prime Minister of Guinea-Bissau in 2015 and 2016

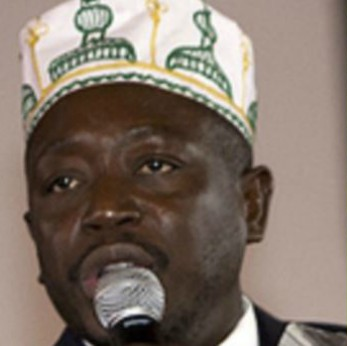

17th Prime Minister of Guinea-Bissau
- In office 27 May 2016 – 18 November 2016
- President: José Mário Vaz
- Preceded by: Carlos Correia
- Succeeded by: Umaro Sissoco Embaló
- In office 20 August 2015 – 17 September 2015
- President: José Mário Vaz
- Preceded by: Domingos Simões Pereira
- Succeeded by: Carlos Correia

Personal details
- Born: 31 January 1973 (age 53)
- Party: Patriotic Front of National Salvation (2018-Present)
- Other political affiliations: African Party for the Independence of Guinea and Cape Verde (2008-2016)
- Education: University of Havana; Graduate Institute of Applied Psychology

Baciro Djá is a Bissau-Guinean politician who was the prime minister of Guinea-Bissau from 20 August 2015 to 17 September 2015 and from 27 May to 18 November 2016.

== Early life ==
Baciro Djá was born on 31 January 1973. He graduated in social psychology from the University of Havana, Cuba, in 1996. In 1998, he received a master's degree in psychopathology and clinical psychology at the Instituto Superior de Psicologia Aplicada in Lisbon, Portugal. From 2006 to 2008 Djá was Reform Project coordinator at Defense and Safety sector and also the president of the Institute of National Defense.

== Political career ==
In 2008 he was elected a member of parliament, and in the same year he was appointed Minister of Youth and Sports. In 2011 and 2012 he served as Minister of National Defence. In 2012 he presented himself as an independent presidential candidate. He served as the third vice-president of the PAIGC, the majority party in the Guinean parliament. He is said to be fluent in Portuguese, French and Spanish.

He became prime minister on 20 August 2015 and resigned on 9 September 2015 after 20 days in the post and just two days after appointing his cabinet. Djá handed in his resignation after the Supreme Court ruled his appointment violated the constitution, due to the fact that parliament was not properly consulted before he was instituted in the post.

Djá was expelled on 20 November 2016 from the PAIGC party. He was accused to have shown contempt for the party statutes, through his attempt to become prime minister.

Djá was the nominee for the 'Patriotic Front of National Salvation' in the 2019 Guinea-Bissau presidential election. He finished in 6th place with 1.28% of the vote.

Political offices
Preceded by Domingos Simões Pereira	Prime Minister of Guinea-Bissau; 2015	Succeeded by Carlos Correia
Preceded by Carlos Correia	Prime Minister of Guinea-Bissau; 2016	Succeeded by Umaro Sissoco Embaló
