= COVID-19 pandemic in Guinea-Bissau =

- Disease: COVID-19
- Pathogen: SARS-CoV-2
- Location: Guinea-Bissau
- Arrival date: 25 March 2020 (6 years and 6 months)
- Confirmed cases: 9,614 (updated 18 September 2026)
- Deaths: 177 (updated 18 September 2026)

The COVID-19 pandemic in Guinea-Bissau is part of the worldwide pandemic of coronavirus disease 2019 (COVID-19) caused by severe acute respiratory syndrome coronavirus 2 (SARS-CoV-2). The virus was confirmed to have reached Guinea-Bissau in March 2020.

Guinea-Bissau reported their first two cases of COVID-19 on March 24, 2020. Restrictions were officially placed on March 18 to retain the spread of the virus. Authorities in Guinea-Bissau declared that land borders were to close and a ban to all flights arriving and leaving Osvaldo Vieira International Airport on March 17, 2020. The government has closed or restricted access to public services, markets, restaurants and forbid religious or traditional ceremonies, to reduce the spread of COVID-19, yet essential services for basic needs remained open as of March 31, 2020.

== Background ==
On 12 January 2020, the World Health Organization (WHO) confirmed that a novel coronavirus was the cause of a respiratory illness in a cluster of people in Wuhan City, Hubei Province, China, which was reported to the WHO on 31 December 2019. COVID-19 is an infectious disease that can be transmitted through saliva droplets or discharge from an infected person by sneezing, coughing or contracted from surfaces. Most people infected by the COVID-19 virus will show mild to moderate illnesses related to their respiratory system and will not require special treatment for recovery.

The case fatality ratio for COVID-19 has been much lower than SARS of 2003, but the transmission has been significantly greater, with a significant total death toll. Model-based simulations for Guinea-Bissau suggest that the 95% confidence interval for the time-varying reproduction number R_{t} has been lower than 1.0 since August 2021.

== Timeline ==
=== March 2020 ===
On 25 March, Guinea-Bissau confirmed its first two COVID-19 cases, a Congolese U.N. employee and an Indian citizen. A month-long state of emergency with night-time curfew was introduced on 28 March.

During the month nine persons tested positive. All nine cases remained active at the end of the month.

=== April to June 2020 ===
Guinea-Bissau recorded its first death on 26 April. The existing state of emergency was prolonged until 11 May.

On 29 April, the Prime Minister Nuno Gomes Nabiam, Interior Minister Botche Candé, Secretary of State for Public Order Mario Fambé, and Secretary of State for Regional Integration Monica Buaro da Costa had tested positive for the coronavirus.

In April, 192 new cases were reported, bringing the total number of confirmed cases to 201. The death toll was 1. Fifteen patients recovered, leaving 185 active cases at the end of the month.

On 1 May, the Minister of Public Health Antonio Deuna tested positive for the coronavirus.

There were 1,121 new cases in May, raising the total number of confirmed cases to 1,322. The death toll rose to 8. The number of the active cases at the end of the month was 1,206.

On 16 June, Reuters reported that 9% of health care workers have been infected with COVID-19. According to Joana Cortez, a WHO expert in Guinea-Bissau, the three main Bissau hospitals are currently facing rooms filled with COVID-19 patients and a breakdown in essential medical services.

On 26 June, president Umaro Sissoco Embaló announced a one-month extension of the state of emergency, but lifted the curfew.

In June, the number of confirmed cases grew by 332 to 1654. The death toll rose to 24. There were 1313 active cases at the end of the month.

=== July to December 2020 ===
There were 327 new cases in July, 224 in August, 119 in September, 89 in October, 28 in November, and 11 in December. The total number of cases stood at 1981 in July, 2205 in August, 2324 in September, 2413 in October, 2441 in November, and 2452 in December.

The number of recovered patients reached 802 in July, 1549 in September, 1818 in October, 2327 in November, and 2397 in December, leaving 1152 active cases at the end of July, 1044 at the end of August, 736 at the end of September, 554 at the end of October, 70 at the end of November, and 10 at the end of December.

The death toll rose to 27 in July, 34 in August, 39 in September, 41 in October, 44 in November, and 45 in December.

=== January to December 2021 ===
Vaccinations started on 2 April.

There were 182 new cases in January, 628 in February, 388 in March, 83 in April, 33 in May, 87 in June, 645 in July, 1301 in August, 308 in September, 27 in October, 306 in November, and 44 in December. The total number of cases stood at 2634 in January, 3262 in February, 3650 in March, 3733 in April, 3766 in May, 3853 in June, 4498 in July, 5799 in August, 6107 in September, 6134 in October, 6440 in November, and 6484 in December.

The number of recovered patients stood at 2427 in January, 2613 in February, 2972 in March, 3300 in April, 3518 in May, 3579 in June, 3968 in July, 4810 in August, 5312 in September, 5588 in October, 6271 in November, 6302 in December, leaving 162 active cases at the end of January, 601 at the end of February, 615 at the end of March, 366 at the end of April, 180 at the end of May, 205 at the end of June, 454 at the end of July, 870 at the end of August, 655 at the end of September, 405 at the end of October, 21 at the end of November, and 33 at the end of December.

The death toll rose to 48 in February, 63 in March, 67 in April, 68 in May, 69 in June, 76 in July, 119 in August, 140 in September, 141 in October, 148 in November, and 149 in December.

Modeling carried out by the WHO's Regional Office for Africa suggests that due to under-reporting, the true cumulative number of infections by the end of 2021 was around 880,000 while the true number of COVID-19 deaths was around 940.

=== January to December 2022 ===
There were 1102 new cases in January, 436 in February, 129 in March, 51 in April, 78 in May, 89 in June, 43 in July, 384 in August, 52 in September, and 99 in December. The total number of cases stood at 7586 in January, 8022 in February, 8151 in March, 8202 in April, 8280 in May, 8369 in June, 8412 in July, 8796 in August, 8848 in September, and 8947 in December.

The number of recovered patients stood at 6642 in January, 7002 in February, 7146 in March, 7528 in April, 8042 in May, 8124 in June, 8301 in August, 8642 in September, and 8656 in December, leaving 788 active cases at the end of January, 853 at the end of February, 835 at the end of March, 503 at the end of April, 61 at the end of May, 68 at the end of June, 320 at the end of August, 30 at the end of September, and 115 at the end of December.

The death toll rose to 156 in January, 167 in February, 170 in March, 171 in April, 175 in August, and 176 in September.

=== 2023 ===
There were 667 confirmed cases in 2023, bringing the total number of cases to 9614. One person died in 2023, bringing the total death toll to 177.

== Impact ==
=== Healthcare system ===
Guinea-Bissau's health system is highly fragile, they have been exposed to various infectious diseases such as Cholera, Malaria and Meningitis and the country has the highest prevalence of HIV and Tuberculosis infections. With the current diseases, poor infrastructure and public sector implications makes the outbreak of COVID-19 highly severe. There is one doctor for every 5,964 people and one nurse for every 1,223 people. Guinea-Bissau possesses no intensive care unit specialist or fully practical beds and does not have the ascertain supply of oxygen in the Simao Mendes Hospital, which is the principal public hospital in Guinea-Bissau. There are two missionary hospitals in Bissau which lack equipment and coordination and provide some responses to COVID-19. With the rapid transmission of COVID-19 the National Public Health Laboratory is lacking to provide daily testing as a result of limited staff availability and restrains of COVID-19 diagnostic extent. Financial and geographical barriers to testing increase due to quarantine measures, closure of economy activity and the incoming rainy season. Health services are limited due to underfunding. This has caused 35-40% of Guinea-Bissau's population to have to travel greater than 5 km to reach the closest Health Centre (DENARPII) to seek medical attention. Guinea-Bissau has been subjected to financial hardship, lack of technical knowledge to diagnosis and treatment, as well as imposed restrictions by the government which has limited personal freedom for the population and has intensified social inequalities further.

=== Economy ===
Guinea-Bissau's main source of investment comes from international trade. Closure of international borders and trade movement restrictions have prevented the trade of cashew nuts between Guinea-Bissau and international partners. Limited export of cashews has greatly impacted the economy and thus a reduction of daily and seasonal labor force of the country, such as the harvesting of cashew nuts for farmers. The COVID-19 pandemic has greatly reduced international trade for cashews in Guinea-Bissau. Guinea-Bissau's economy is dependent on the export of raw cashew nuts. The yearly cashew campaign has been delayed due to lockdowns affecting 80% of the populations' income. The Finance Minister, João Fadiá of Guinea-Bissau's said that COVID-19 has caused a "very negative" impact on the economy as it has impacted the cashew nut market. A report by De Barros et al. (2020) revealed that many Guinean individuals ask the question: "how to ensure social confinement at home in the absence of public policies to assist families?", due to the lack of safety measure communication to the public. The main city for all urban transport and attraction is the capital of Guinea, Bandim, which would highly affect the entire capital's economy if borders were to close. Transportation between regions have greatly reduced international trade, leading to massive losses for the economy.

=== Religion ===
Since Guinea-Bissau confirmed their positive cases of COVID-19 in the country, the community have changed meaning in simple greetings such as "Kuma di kurpu (how is your body)?" People in the community express worry, mistrust and anxiety during communication. Social distancing measures and practices have disturbed Bissau-Guinean religions and cultural codes, as grouping together is essential for traditional rituals. However, stimulation studies have shown that social distancing has minimised the spread of COVID-19, by reducing physical contact, which involves staying at home, closing of businesses and schools and banning travel.

=== Poverty ===
With imposed restriction measures due to the outbreak of COVID-19 many Bissau-Guinean citizens lost jobs and income opportunities. Two in three Bissau-Guinean citizens are affected by poverty, with a majority living on less than U$1.90 a day. Citizens struggle to sell produce and earn a daily income in rural and urban areas. Income inequality is prominent in rural areas, as many people lacks in decent living standards and access to basic needs such as clean water.

=== Education ===
With imposed restriction measures to limit the spread of COVID-19, schools nationwide were temporarily closed leading to high internet and technology cost which makes home schooling a less practical choice generally. The closure of schools for children may lead to higher risks of dropping out. Due to the temporary closure of schools and loss of jobs during the outbreak children are likely to engage in activities such as child labour, teenage pregnancy or wedlock.

=== Food security ===
As a result of lockdown practices and restrictions in place, basic supplies were restricted around 2800 tons of chicken and 280,000 tons of rice are imported yearly to sustain the country's demands. With these imposed measures, prices of supplies have increased. Mobility measures have restricted access to food especially in urban areas. Lockdown measures mostly affect jobs such as construction, transportation, small business and informal traders, resulting to major barriers in accessing food and basic services. Nutritional status is highly affected due to food access restrains, leading to malnutrition, with the decrease in import of goods due to economic lockdowns, households are more likely to prioritise calorie intake over nutritional values.

=== Gender inequality ===
Women in the workforce are substantially affected, gender-based violence may be increased due to confinement measures as a result of the COVID-19 pandemic. Women are greatly employed in informal wage activities such as preparing food in restaurants, trading or selling fish, fruit or other foods. These implemented lockdowns and restrictions could potentially lead to the increase risk of domestic violence due to an increase in stress levels. Women are the most vulnerable to the pandemic, such as early marriages, trafficking and female health workers and are largely subjected to COVID-19 than men.

=== Travel ===
A reduction of tourism has affected the Guinea-Bissau economy, as profit made by tourism activities are limited and for people to enter and exit Guinea-Bissau's borders a negative COVID-19 test result must be presented. Travelers travelling to Guinea-Bissau have a reduced dependence on medical facilities and some prescription medication needs to be legalised in the country, which further impacts Guinea-Bissau's economy.

== Government response ==
=== Restrictions ===
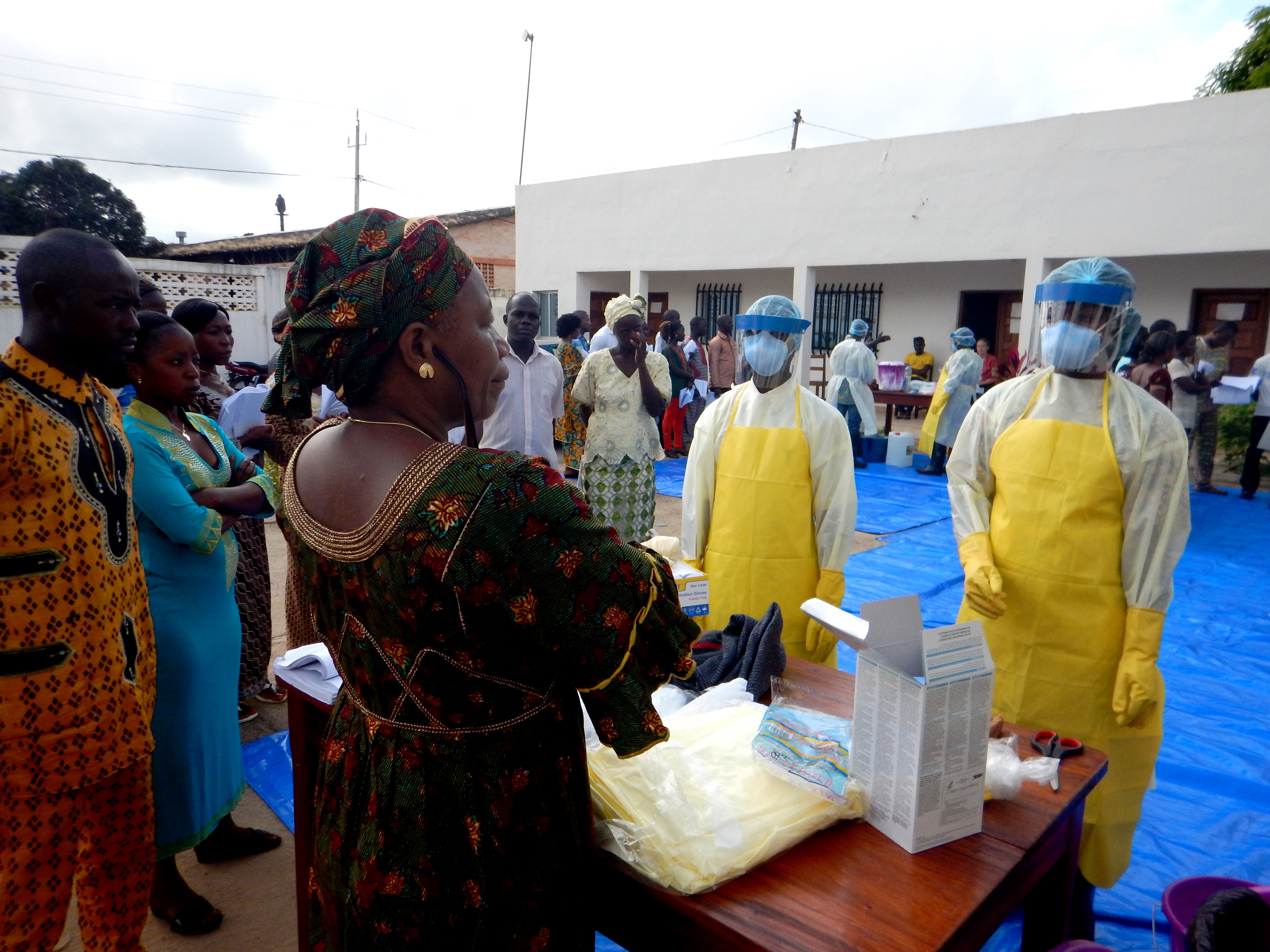
Guinea-Bissau's frontline healthcare workers

A state of emergency was declared to reduce the spread of the COVID-19 virus by the government and announced for the closing of sea and air transportation and borders by land. The government also implemented guidelines and laws to prevent the spread of the COVID-19 virus within the community. These laws limited social gatherings and screenings were made available to detect the COVID-19 virus. The prevention of COVID-19 was led by religious leaders and public figures, as well as traditional power entities and social collectives during communication and social mobilisation. Guinean families were supported through awareness and prevention information against COVID-19 which were provided through networks, associations and most importantly radio stations, which reduces socio-cultural barriers such as attitudes, cultural differences, ethnicity and status to access information about COVID-19. Both Guinea-Bissau's government and the United Nations Children's Emergency Fund (UNICEF) have helped in preparing Guinea-Bissau for the pandemic. The UNICEF and the Secretary of State for Social Communication embedded preventative measures and techniques to the Bissau-Guinean public through social media and on national television to prevent the spread of COVID-19. Public sanitations across 960 communities were provided by the UNICEF (WASH program) around the country to avoid spreading the virus. The World Health Organization recommends practicing hand hygiene and physical distancing which could allow for the best protection of oneself and others. Health workers in Guinea-Bissau have also received training in preventative practices and in identifying cases by the U.N.

=== Financial support ===
Guinea-Bissau was supported by many organisations including Global Partnership for Education (GPE), MPTF and GAVI, as well as the government of Guinea-Bissau who has provided $200,000 for the country to help detain the COVID-19 virus. The Ministries of Finance and Health financially supported hospitals in Guinea- Bissau on March 27, 2020. The Fiscal policy supported and improved hospitals, doctors and nurses received pay benefits of $55,000 monthly, $50,000 for medicine and $100,000 for meals for patients and staff. An official of the WHO in Guinea-Bissau has reported that Cuba has sent a medical team consisting doctors and nurses to assist in fighting the pandemic during the outbreak.

=== UNICEF response ===
Reports on the COVID-19 pandemic in Guinea-Bissau revealed that the UNICEF supported the National Contingency Plan in response to COVID-19 through strategies and interventions focusing on:

- WASH and Infection prevention and control (IPC) measures: Communities have been informed on proper COVID-19 prevention behaviours with hand washing stations installed throughout the country.
- Health services: UNICEF and the Ministry of Health have worked together to assure communities have access to essential health services.
- Medical equipment: The UNICEF have ordered medical supplies and equipment to the National Hospital Simao Mendes.
- Education response and recovery: The Global Partnership for Education COVID-19 fund was endorsed.
- Child protection: The UNICEF have continued to support children without family or parental care by supporting the emergency response project.
- Support services for child protection: The Health ministry has provided social service assistants and psychologist to support people affected and infected by COVID-19. Online platforms against gender-based violence were placed by UNICEF, UNDP, UNDPA, WFP, IOM and other national partners to provide support through social media, audios and videos amid the outbreak.

=== Adaptations to UNICEF development Programmes ===
The UNICEF have adjusted development programmes to the COVID-19 context to improve interventions and prevention of COVID-19 shown in the reports "GUINEA-BISSAU: COVID-19 Situation Report - #05, 2–8 May 2020" and "GUINEA-BISSAU: COVID-19 Situation Report - #07, 16–22 May 2020", which reveals adaptations to ongoing UNICEF development programmes in Guinea-Bissau to enhance the current COVID-19 interventions and prevention programmes. These UNICEF development programmes adapted to the COVID-19 context include:

- Community health programme: As a result of the COVID-19 outbreak, malnutrition is likely to occur for children. The UNICEF have provided funds to purchase nutritional material for acute malnutrition screening. Additional training and protective equipment (masks, gloves and gowns) have been provided to Community Health Workers (CHWs) for COVID-19 prevention.
- Ensuring access to vaccination: The UNICEF supported the MoH on the finalisation of plans, budgets and Men-A campaign plan for the introduction of Men-A and MCV-2 vaccines during the COVID-19 pandemic period.
- Supplies: Nutrition and HIV programmes are continuously being supplied and reached despite the restrictions.
- Nutrition: SAM and breastfeeding services have continued in the COVID-19 context and are supported by the UNICEF. Non-governmental organisations (NGO) and Community health worker's (CHW) have continued to deliver regular therapeutic foods to the Nutrition Direction at central level.
- Joint Programme on Female Genital Mutilation: The National Committee for the Abandonment of Harmful Practices redesigned and implemented set planned activities for COVID-19 prevention and adaptation of continued interventions and fortifying domestic and children violence prevention within the COVID-19 context.

=== BCG vaccine ===
A study in Guinea-Bissau showed that the BCG vaccine could decrease respiratory tract infections in children. Bacillus Calmette-Guerin (BCG) is a vaccination developed to fight against tuberculosis and has been widely used around the world. However, the BCG vaccine was reported to reduce 50% of mortality rates in infants. Recent studies have also shown a decrease of respiratory tract infections in adolescents by using BCG vaccination in South Africa.

== See also ==
- COVID-19 pandemic in Africa
- COVID-19 pandemic by country and territory
