= Universidade Amílcar Cabral =

Public university in Guinea-Bissau

Coordinates: 11.8559°N 15.6110°W

- Type: Public research university
- Established: 6 December 1999; 26 years ago
- Rector: Timóteo Saba M'bunde
- Location: Bissau, Guinea-Bissau
- Campus: Urban

The Universidade Amílcar Cabral (UAC; in english: Amílcar Cabral University) is a public higher education institution in Guinea-Bissau. It is the only public university in the country.

Founded in 1999 with the mission of federating the nation's various top institutions, it was abruptly closed in 2008. From 2010, it underwent a major restructuring, culminating in its resumption of activities in 2013, with the appointment of its new administrative body.

In 2020, the UAC federative system consisted of the Faculty of Law, the Faculty of Humanities and the Faculty of Medicine, in addition to the National School of Administration and the Guinea-Bissau Higher School of Education.

With rectory installed in the city of Bissau, the university was named after Amílcar Cabral, considered the ideologist and political architect of the country's independence.

In May 2015, UNESCO reportedly donated about $600,000 worth of computer equipment to the university.
