= Martinho Ndafa Kabi =

Bissau-Guinean politician (born 1957)

15th Prime Minister of Guinea-Bissau
- In office 13 April 2007 – 5 August 2008
- President: João Bernardo Vieira
- Preceded by: Aristides Gomes
- Succeeded by: Carlos Correia

Personal details
- Born: 17 September 1957 (age 68)
- Party: PAIGC

Martinho Ndafa Kabi (born 17 September 1957) is a Bissau-Guinean politician who was the prime minister of Guinea-Bissau from 13 April 2007 to 5 August 2008. He is a leading member of the African Party for the Independence of Guinea and Cape Verde (PAIGC).

== Life and career ==
Kabi, a member of the Balanta ethnic group, was born in Nhacra in Oio Region. He joined PAIGC in March 1974 and was a delegate to PAIGC's First Extraordinary Congress (November 1981), Second Extraordinary Congress (January 1991), Fifth Ordinary Congress (December 1991), Sixth Ordinary Congress (May 1998), Third Extraordinary Congress (September 1999), and its Fourth Extraordinary Congress (January–February 2002). He was elected as President of the National Commission of Verification and Control at the Third Extraordinary Congress in 1999 and as the Third Vice-President of PAIGC at the Fourth Extraordinary Congress in 2002. Kabi is considered a PAIGC hardliner.

In the government of Prime Minister Carlos Gomes Júnior, he served as Minister of Energy and Natural Resources from May 2004 to April 2005, when he became Minister of Defense. After President Nino Vieira dismissed Gomes Júnior, the Standing Committee of the PAIGC Political Bureau chose Kabi to succeed him as prime minister, but Vieira instead appointed Aristides Gomes, a PAIGC dissident loyal to the President, as prime minister on 2 November 2005. PAIGC argued that the appointment of Gomes was "arbitrary and unconstitutional", but it was upheld by the Supreme Court in January 2006.

The PAIGC, the Social Renewal Party (PRS), and the United Social Democratic Party (PUSD) signed a "stability pact" in March 2007. After Aristides Gomes lost a no-confidence vote and submitted his resignation at the end of the month, Kabi was proposed as prime minister by the three-party alliance. On April 9, it was announced that President João Bernardo Vieira had rejected the choice of Kabi, but the coalition said that they maintained him as their choice; later on the same day, Vieira appointed Kabi as the new prime minister. Kabi said that the main focus of his government would be the organization of a planned 2008 legislative election; he also said that national reconciliation was necessary to achieve this goal and that he would "make dialogue a priority of [his] term in office".

Kabi took office on April 13, and his government, composed of 20 ministers (including eight from the PAIGC, eight from the PRS, and two from the PUSD) was named on April 17. Kabi was viewed as being close to the Chief of Staff of the Armed Forces.

As prime minister, Kabi was involved in a long dispute with the President of the Tribunal of Accounts, Francisco Fadul.

PAIGC withdrew its backing for Kabi on February 29, 2008, saying that this was done "to avoid acts of indiscipline threatening cohesion and unity in the party". PAIGC President Carlos Gomes Júnior criticized Kabi for allegedly lacking loyalty to the party and sympathizing with the PRS. At PAIGC's Seventh Ordinary Congress in June–July 2008, Kabi was a candidate for the party leadership; Gomes and Malam Bacai Sanhá were the main candidates, however, and Gomes was re-elected as PAIGC President. Kabi received 95 votes, placing a distant third.

After Kabi dismissed the directors of customs, taxes and the treasury on July 25, 2008 without notifying the party in advance, PAIGC decided to withdraw from the three-party stability pact that was signed in March 2007.

Vieira dissolved the National People's Assembly and appointed Carlos Correia to replace Kabi as prime minister on August 5, 2008. Kabi was out of the country at the time for health reasons.
