= Iafai Camará =

Bissau-Guinean politician

Vice President of Guinea-Bissau
- In office 7 November 1985 – December 1991
- President: João Bernardo Vieira
- Preceded by: Paulo Correia
- Succeeded by: Position abolished

Personal details
- Born: Gambia
- Political party: PAIGC

Colonel Iafai Camará is a Bissau-Guinean politician from PAIGC.

He was born in Gambia, and was a manual laborer on the farm managed by Amílcar Cabral, who recruited him to PAIGC. During War of Independence, he was military commander of the eastern front. After the 1980 coup d'état he was a member of the Revolutionary Council. He was appointed as the minister of the armed forces from 1982 to 1984.

Camará was appointed as the Second Vice President in May 1984. He was appointed as the First Vice President on 7 November 1985 to replace Paulo Correia. He was also later again minister of the armed forces, allegedly supplying arms to the rebels in Casamance conflict in 1991. Camara is one of the few PAIGC commanders who came into power in the 1980 coup d'état and survived the turbulence in leadership positions.
