= Faculty of Law of Bissau =

Public law school in BIssau, Guinea-Bissau

- Type: Public university
- Established: 27 September 1979; 46 years ago
- Director: Alcides Gomes
- Location: Bissau, Guinea-Bissau
- Campus: Urban

The Faculty of Law of Bissau (Portuguese: Faculdade de Direito de Bissau, FDB), sometimes also referred to as the Faculty of Law of Guinea-Bissau (Faculdade de Direito da Guiné-Bissau) is a public university based in Bissau, providing primarily university degrees in law in Guinea-Bissau. It was founded as a law school on 27 September 1979 and became a law faculty on 26 November 1990.

It is the only institution in the country that awards law degrees.

The institution is under the supervision of the Ministry of National Education. It was announced in 2014 that the university became a component of the national system of the Universidade Amílcar Cabral. The gradual reintegration of the UAC began in 2019, during the celebrations of the anniversary of the FDB.

== History ==
Having in mind the necessity to have professional graduates in law in Guinea-Bissau, president Luís Cabral signed decree n.º 22 on 27 September 1979, creating the Escola de Direito de Bissau. The school was oriented towards technical degrees, and not necessarily bachelor's degrees in law.

In 1989, studies were initiated for the conversation of the school into a faculty school, being invited by the Faculty of Law at the University of Lisbon so that they could provide the necessary technical and scientific advisory.

After, on 26 November 1990, by decree n.º 34, president João Bernardo Vieira converted the Escola de Direito de Bissau to the Faculdade de Direito de Bissau (FDB), transferring to it all of the necessary attributions. The institution rose with a protocol of cooperation with the Faculty of Law of Lisbon, which became a scientific and pedagogical advisor to the faculty.

On 24 April 1993, the Faculty of Law of Bissau became part of the Associação das Universidades de Língua Portuguesa as a titular member.

With the beginning of operations at Universidade Amílcar Cabral (UAC), FDB was absorbed into the institution in 2003, in an attempt to strengthen national post-secondary institutions. However, in 2008, the Bissau-Guinean government alleged a lack of optimal conditions to finance the university, declaring thereafter the concession of UAC to private initiatives. With the total passage of the university to private capital, the academic community of FDB voted for the disaffiliation with UAC and became autonomous once again.

It was later announced, in 2014, that it became a component of the federal system of Universidade Amílcar Cabral. The gradual reintegration into the UAC effectively began in 2019, during the anniversary celebrations of the FDB.

== Courses offered ==
The following courses are offered at FDB:

- Graduation:
  - Law
- Post-graduation:
  - Master's in Energy and Natural Resource Law (2014)
  - Master's in Telecommunications Law (2015)
