= Rui Duarte de Barros =

Prime Minister of Guinea-Bissau (2012–2014; 2023–2025)

Prime Minister of Guinea-Bissau
- In office 20 December 2023 – 7 August 2025
- President: Umaro Sissoco Embaló
- Preceded by: Geraldo Martins
- Succeeded by: Braima Camará
- Acting; 16 May 2012 – 3 July 2014
- President: Manuel Serifo Nhamadjo (acting); José Mário Vaz
- Preceded by: Adiato Djaló Nandigna (acting)
- Succeeded by: Domingos Simões Pereira

Personal details
- Born: 18 February 1960 (age 66)
- Party: PAIGC; PRS (as of 2012)

Rui Duarte de Barros (born 18 February 1960) is a Bissau-Guinean economist and politician who has served as the prime minister of Guinea-Bissau from 17 January 2024 to 7 August 2025. His previous positions include being the Minister of Economy and Finance, as well as being the acting prime minister from 16 May 2012 to 3 July 2014 following a military coup.

== Career ==
Duarte de Barros was trained as an engineer in Havana, Cuba. Between 2001 and 2003, he was Secretary of State for the Treasury and then Minister of Finance. In 2003, he became Guinea-Bissau's commissioner for the West African Economic and Monetary Union, holding this position until 2011.

Following a coup d'état in April 2012, the Military Command signed a political transition agreement with 36 political parties, excluding the previously ruling PAIGC. As a result, Duarte de Barros – a member of the Party for Social Renewal – was appointed as transitional prime minister on 16 May 2012. Carlos Gomes Júnior, the former prime minister, opposed the appointment of Duarte de Barros, stating that "it is a government that we do not recognize". The next prime minister was chosen in the 2014 Guinea-Bissau general election.

In December 2023, President Umaro Sissoco Embaló dissolved the parliament due to an alleged coup attempt. He then reappointed Geraldo Martins as prime minister, who was tasked with forming a new government; Martins had been prime minister since the PAIGC-led PAI-Terra Ranka coalition's victory in the June 2023 elections. On 20 December, Sissoco Embaló dismissed Martins and appointed Duarte de Barros as prime minister. At the time, Duarte de Barros was serving as the chairman of the Administrative Council of the National People's Assembly, as well as a PAIGC member of parliament.

Duarte de Barros was dismissed by Embaló as prime minister on 7 August 2025 and was replaced with Braima Camará.

== Personal life ==
As of 2012, he was married and had two children.
