= José Mário Vaz =

President of Guinea-Bissau from 2014 to 2020

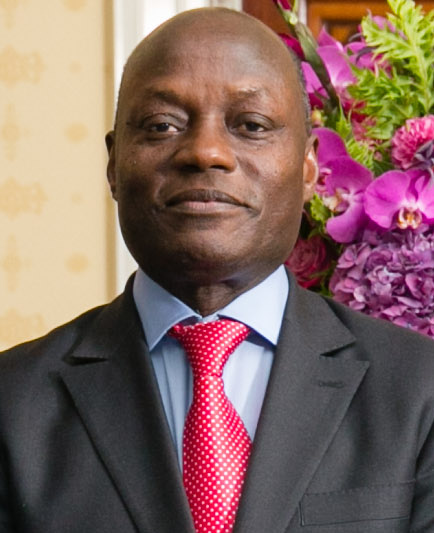
- Vaz at the United States–Africa Leaders Summit 2014

5th President of Guinea-Bissau
- In office 23 June 2014 – 27 February 2020
- Prime Minister: Rui Duarte de Barros (Acting); Domingos Simões Pereira; Baciro Djá; Carlos Correia; Baciro Djá; Umaro Sissoco Embaló; Artur Silva; Aristides Gomes; Faustino Imbali
- Preceded by: Manuel Serifo Nhamadjo (Acting)
- Succeeded by: Umaro Sissoco Embaló

Minister of Finance
- In office 8 September 2009 – 12 February 2012
- Preceded by: Issuf Sanhá
- Succeeded by: Abubacar Demba Dahaba

Personal details
- Born: 10 December 1957 (age 68) Calequisse, Portuguese Guinea
- Party: PAIGC (Before 2015); Independent (2015–present)
- Spouse: Rosa Teixeira Goudiaby
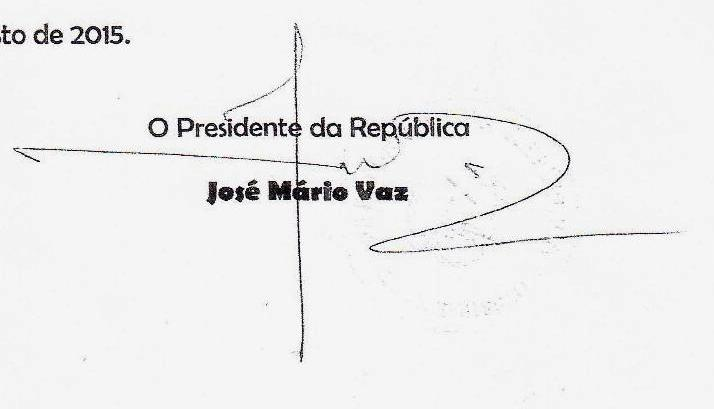
- Signature

José Mário Vaz (born 10 December 1957) is a Bissau-Guinean politician who served as president of Guinea-Bissau from 23 June 2014 to 27 February 2020.

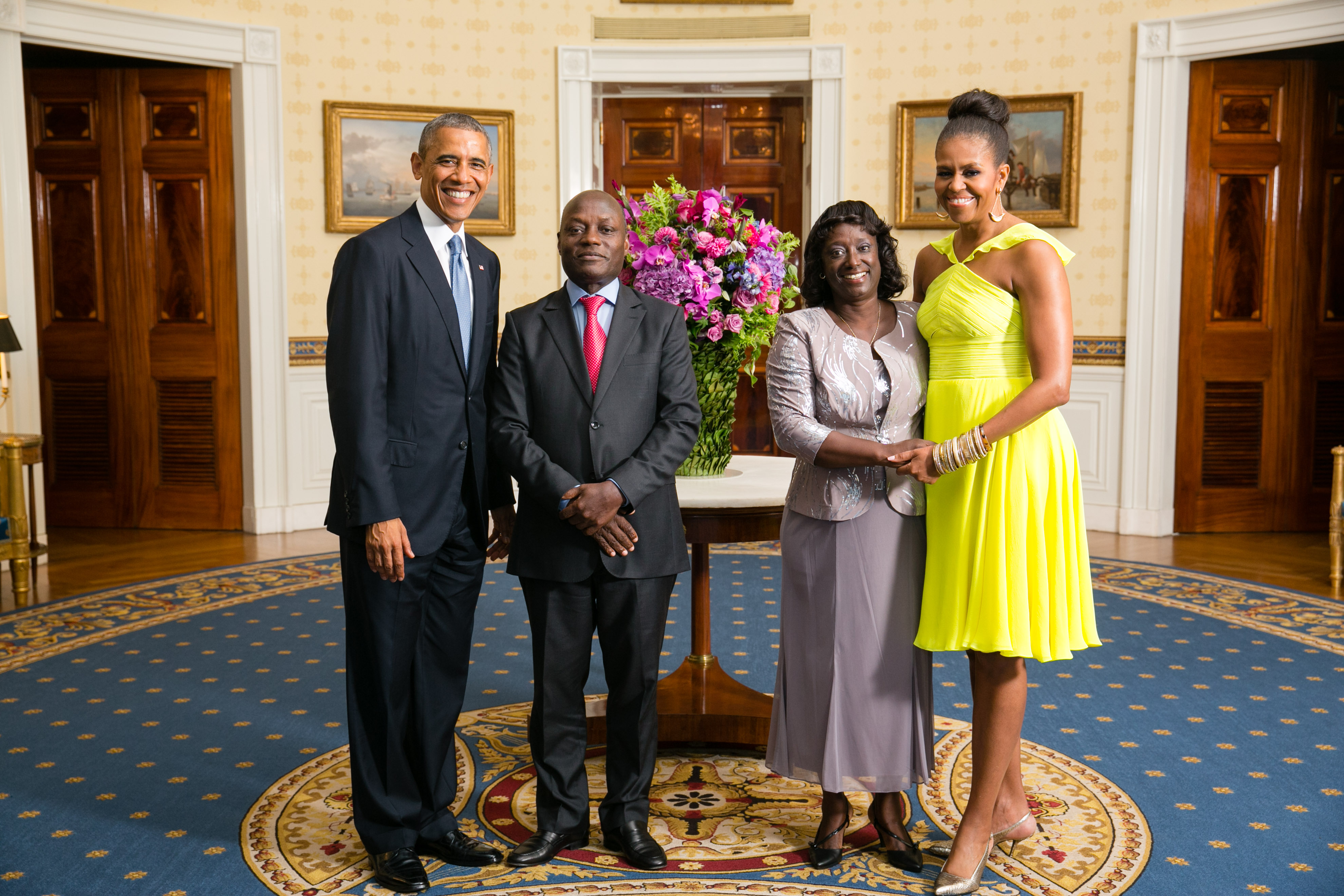
Vaz in 2014.

== Early life ==
Popularly known by the nickname "Jomav," José Mário Vaz was born in 1957 to Mário Vaz and Amelia Gomes in Calequisse, outside the city of Cacheu in northern Guinea-Bissau. He is married and has three children. He graduated as an economist in Lisbon and did an internship at the Office of Economic Studies of the Banco de Portugal in 1982.

== Political career ==
In 2004, he was elected as mayor of Bissau, a position he held until 2009, when he was named by President Malam Bacai Sanhá as minister of finance. He and the other ministers were ousted in the 2012 Guinea-Bissau coup d'etat.

Vaz is a member of the African Party for the Independence of Guinea and Cape Verde and won the right to represent the party in the 2014 presidential election by besting eleven hopefuls during a two-day primary in March 2014.

In the first round of the election, held on 13 April 2014, Vaz won 40.9% of the votes, and entered a runoff with the second leading vote-getter, Nuno Gomes Nabiam, who was backed by the military. In the second round, on 18 May 2014, he received 61.9% of the vote. Though Gomes Nabiam initially contested the result, he conceded the election on 22 May 2014.

During the election, Vaz promised to focus on reducing poverty and increasing investment in agriculture, as well as forgiveness for participation in the sorts of criminal activities that have turned Guinea-Bissau into a haven for drug traffickers. After the 2012 coup, he fled to Portugal, but returned in February 2013 and spent three days under arrest. He was accused of being involved in the disappearance of €9.1 million in aid donated to the country by Angola, a charge he denies, and it remains unclear if the donation was ever sent.

=== Presidency ===
Vaz was inaugurated on 23 June 2014. Vaz's inauguration ended a transitional government that emerged in the wake of a coup in April 2012.

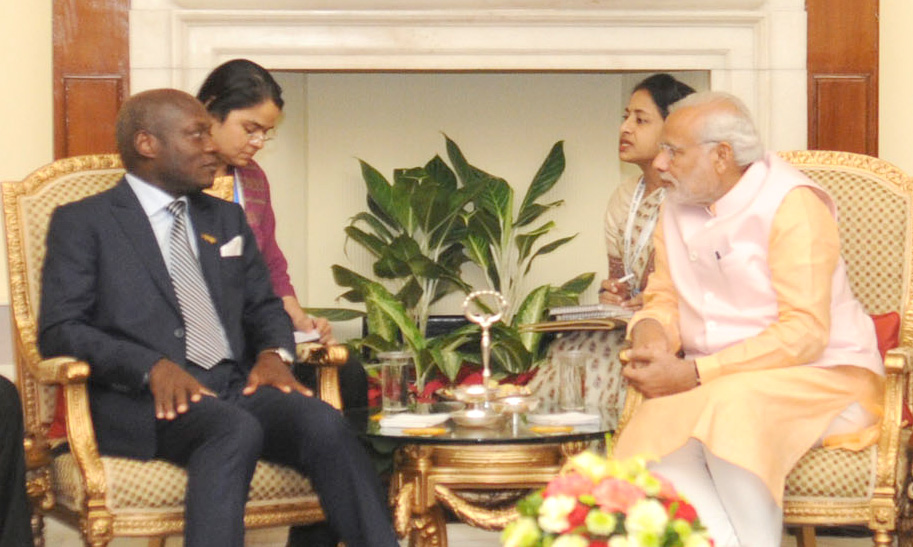
Vaz with Indian Prime Minister Modi in October 2015.

When he won the 2014 Guinea-Bissau general election he became president with Domingos Simões Pereira the prime minister. As president a political crisis occurred under his administration with efforts to end this crisis.

Vaz has the peculiarity of being the only president of Guinea-Bissau since independence to be able to finish his five-year term.

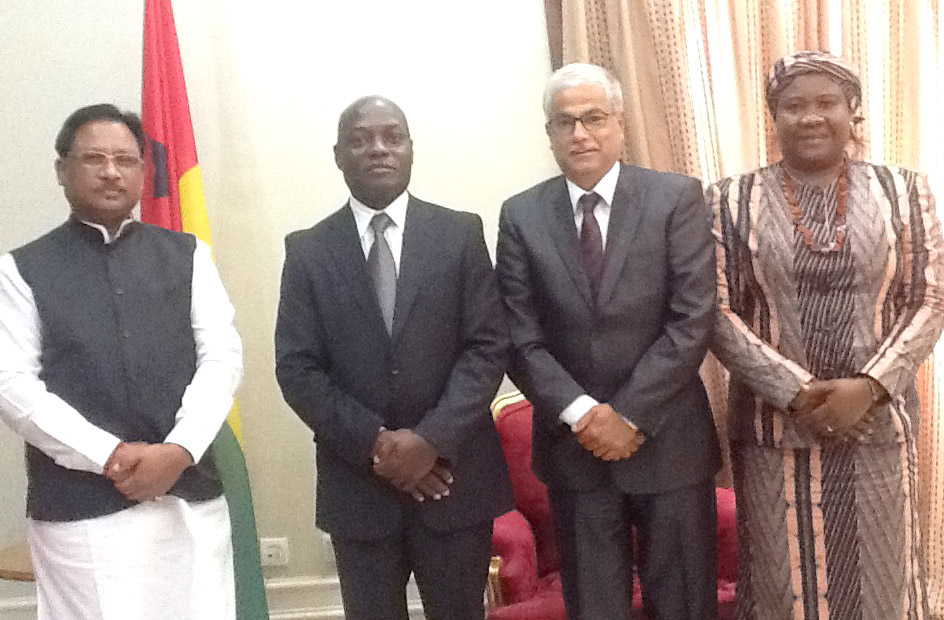
Vaz with Indian Minister of State Deo Sai.

The International Monetary Fund met with Vaz and other officials to discuss about economic activity which were supported by fiscal management and a 2018 draft budget.

During his presidency drug trade in Guinea-Bissau took place which made him worried about elections and popularity. He met with council ambassadors of the UN about this.

President Vaz sacked the government with immediate effect which caused a crisis for Guinea-Bissau and the election taking place a month after.

On June 27, 2019, four days after the end of his term, the assembly of Guinea-Bissau chose him as a replacement by the president of the National People's Assembly, Cipriano Cassamá, who until the November elections remained as acting president. On 29 June, ECOWAS decided that Vaz would stay in office until after the 2019 elections.

Vaz ran as an independent in the 2019 elections but received only 12% of the vote in the first round and failed to advance to the second round.

== See also ==
- Politics of Guinea-Bissau

Political offices
| Preceded by Manuel Serifo Nhamadjo; Acting | President of Guinea-Bissau; 2014–2020 | Succeeded by Umaro Sissoco Embaló |
