= Nuno Gomes Nabiam =

Prime Minister of Guinea-Bissau from 2020 to 2023

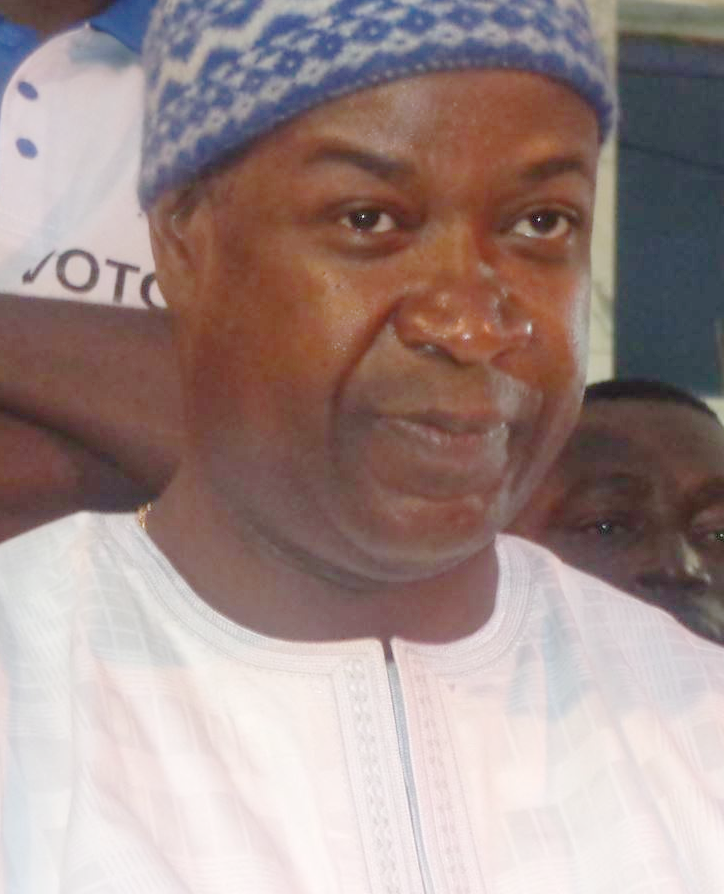
- Gomes Nabiam in 2017

Prime Minister of Guinea-Bissau
- In office 28 February 2020 – 8 August 2023
- President: Umaro Sissoco Embaló
- Preceded by: Aristides Gomes
- Succeeded by: Geraldo Martins

Personal details
- Born: 17 November 1966 (age 59)
- Party: APU

Nuno Gomes Nabiam (born 17 November 1966) is a Bissau-Guinean politician who served as the Prime Minister of Guinea-Bissau from 28 February 2020 to 8 August 2023.

== Personal life ==
Gomes Nabiam graduated from Kwame Nkrumah National High School. He completed his degree at the Higher Institute of Civil Aviation Engineering in Kyiv, Ukraine, and was awarded a Civil Aviation Scholarship in 1986. Gomes Nabiam later studied in the United States, where he obtained a master's degree in business management.

On 29 April 2020, he and three ministers tested positive for COVID-19.

== Political career ==
Gomes Nabiam became an activist in the African Youth Amílcar Cabral in 1978. In 1980, he became a militant in the PAIGC party. In 2012, he was appointed chairman of the board of directors of the Guinea-Bissau Civil Aviation Agency by the Bissau-Guinean government.

On 28 February 2020, Gomes Nabiam was appointed Prime Minister of Guinea-Bissau. He is a member of the Assembly of the People United political party.
