= List of wars involving Guinea-Bissau =

This is a list of wars involving the Republic of Guinea-Bissau.

Conflict	Combatant 1	Combatant 2	Results
Portuguese Colonial War (1961–1974)	Angola: MPLA; FNLA; UNITA; Guinea: PAIGC; Mozambique: (Mozambique) FRELIMO	Portugal	Carnation Revolution: Military stalemate; Rebel political victory; Alvor Agreement; Algiers Accord; Lusaka Accord; Portuguese overseas territories in Africa become independent
Guinea-Bissau War of Independence (1963–1974)	PAIGC; Cuba^{[a]}	Portugal	Algiers Accord: Two-thirds of Portuguese Guinea falls under PAIGC control by 1971; Unilateral declaration of independence in September 1973; Ceasefire following the Carnation Revolution; Diplomatic agreement securing the independence of Guinea-Bissau in September 1974; Independence of Guinea-Bissau from Portugal
Guinea-Bissau Civil War (1998–1999)	Guinea-Bissau; Senegal; Guinea; Supported by: France; Portugal	Military rebels MFDC; Supported by: United States	Ousting of President João Bernardo Vieira
2012 Guinea-Bissau coup d'état (2012)	(Guinea-Bissau) Civilian administration (including Election Commission); Civil society (Guinea-Bissau) Police (Guinea-Bissau) PAIGC (Angola) Angolan Military	Military Command (Guinea-Bissau) National Transitional Council	Bissau seized by military command; Military command seizes control of state media; Arrest of presidential candidate Carlos Gomes Júnior and interim President Raimundo Pereira; Dissolution of state institutions; Aborted election; Interim transitional government led by Manuel Serifo Nhamadjo, after consensus acting Prime Minister Rui Duarte de Barros
