= United Nations Security Council Resolution 1949 =

UN Security Council Resolution 1949
- Guinea-Bissau within the African Union
- Date: 23 November 2010
- Meeting no.: 6,428
- Code: S/RES/1949 (Document)
- Subject: The situation in Guinea-Bissau
- Voting summary: 15 voted for; None voted against; None abstained
- Result: Adopted

Security Council composition
- Permanent members: China; France; Russia; United Kingdom; United States
- Non-permanent members: Austria; Bosnia–Herzegovina; Brazil; Gabon; Japan; Lebanon; Mexico; Nigeria; Turkey; Uganda

United Nations Security Council Resolution 1949, adopted unanimously on 23 November 2010, after recalling previous resolutions on the situation in Guinea-Bissau, particularly Resolution 1876 (2009), the Council extended the mandate of the United Nations Integrated Peacebuilding Office in Guinea-Bissau (UNIOGBIS) for a further period of one year until 31 December 2011.

== Resolution ==
=== Observations ===
In the preamble of the resolution, the Council expressed concern about the continued instability in Guinea-Bissau, including the lack of civilian oversight of the military and unlawful detentions since the unrest in April 2010. It stated that the situation in the country posed threats to security and stability in the region, particularly the issue of drug trafficking. All parties in Guinea-Bissau had to continue dialogue, promote human rights and the rule of law and fight against impunity.

Meanwhile, the resolution also praised the work of the Economic Community of West African States (ECOWAS) and the Community of Portuguese Language Countries (CPLP) and affirmed that the Guinea-Bissau government was responsible for the security of the population and development.

=== Acts ===
The mandate of UNIOGBIS was extended and the Secretary-General Ban Ki-moon was asked to monitor its progress. Guinea-Bissau parties were urged to engage in dialogue, and the armed forces were called upon to cease interference in political issues and respect constitutional order and civilian rule. At the same time, political leaders were asked not to involve the military and judiciary in politics and resolve problems through political means.

The resolution further called upon the government to continue investigations into political assassinations that took place in March and June 2009 and hold those responsible accountable. It also had to ensure due process of law with respect to those responsible for crimes, release or prosecute those detained during the unrest of April 2010, and tackle corruption.

Finally, UNIOGBIS, the African Union, European Union and CPLP were asked to assist in the peacebuilding efforts in Guinea-Bissau and tackle organised crime and drug trafficking.

== See also ==
- 2010 Guinea-Bissau military unrest
- Guinea-Bissau Civil War
- History of Guinea-Bissau
- List of United Nations Security Council Resolutions 1901 to 2000 (2009–2011)
- United Nations Peacebuilding Support Office in Guinea-Bissau
