= United Nations Security Council Resolution 1580 =

UN Security Council Resolution 1580
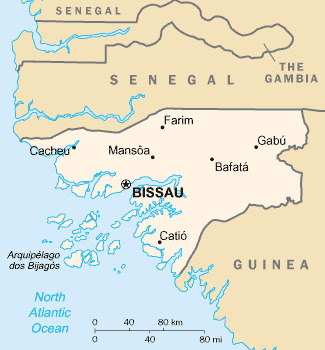
- Guinea-Bissau
- Date: 22 December 2004
- Meeting no.: 5,107
- Code: S/RES/1580 (Document)
- Subject: The situation in Guinea-Bissau
- Voting summary: 15 voted for; None voted against; None abstained
- Result: Adopted

Security Council composition
- Permanent members: China; France; Russia; United Kingdom; United States
- Non-permanent members: Algeria; Angola; Benin; Brazil; Chile; Germany; Pakistan; Philippines; Romania; Spain

United Nations Security Council resolution 1580, adopted unanimously on 22 December 2004, after reaffirming resolutions 1216 (1998) and 1233 (1999) on the situation in Guinea-Bissau, the Council extended the mandate of the United Nations Peacebuilding Support Office in Guinea-Bissau (UNOGBIS) for a further period of one year and revised its operations. It was the final Security Council resolution adopted in 2004.

== Resolution ==
=== Observations ===
The Security Council began by expressing its concern about recent developments in Guinea-Bissau, particularly a mutiny on 6 October 2004 which resulted in the deaths of Chief of General Staff, General Veríssimo Correia Seabra, and the armed forces spokesman, Colonel Domingos de Barros and had setback gains since legislative elections held in March 2004. It stated that such incidents highlighted the "fragility" of the transitional process ongoing in the country, and that such events undermined social and economic development and confidence of the international community.

=== Acts ===
The mandate of UNOGBIS, as a special political mission, was extended for one year with the following revised mandate:

- enhance political dialogue, promote national reconciliation and respect for the rule of law and human rights;
- ensure the return to normalcy, including the holding of presidential elections;
- support efforts to reform the security sector and strengthen national institutions.

The National People's Assembly of Guinea-Bissau was urged to consider the principles of justice and ending impunity while it debated an amnesty for those participating in military interventions since 1980. The government was called upon to consider a plan for security sector reform. Meanwhile, the Secretary-General Kofi Annan was to establish a fund for Guinea-Bissau to other nations could contribute to. He was also asked to keep the Council informed of developments in the country.

== See also ==
- Guinea-Bissau Civil War
- History of Guinea-Bissau
- List of United Nations Security Council Resolutions 1501 to 1600 (2003–2005)
