= Socialist Alliance of Guinea =

- Founded: 2000
- Dissolved: 2012 or 2013
- Ideology: Socialism
- Political position: Left-wing
- National affiliation: United People's Alliance

The Alliance of Patriotic Forces (Portuguese: Aliança Socialista da Guiné, APG) was a political party in Guinea-Bissau.

== History ==
The party was established by Fernando Gomes in 2000. In 2004 it joined the United People's Alliance in order to contest the March 2004 parliamentary elections. The Alliance received 1.36% of the vote and won a single seat, taken by Gomes.

The United People's Alliance was dissolved by the end of 2004, and Gomes left the APG to join the African Party for the Independence of Guinea and Cape Verde.

The ASG supported the 2012 military coup.
