= Guinea-Bissau coup d'état =

Guinea-Bissau coup d'état may refer to:

- 1980 Guinea-Bissau coup d'état
- 1998 Guinea-Bissau coup attempt
- 2003 Guinea-Bissau coup d'état
- 2011 Guinea-Bissau coup attempt
- 2012 Guinea-Bissau coup d'état
- 2022 Guinea-Bissau coup attempt
- 2023 Guinea-Bissau coup attempt
- 2025 Guinea-Bissau coup d'état
