= 2012 Guinea-Bissau coup d'état =

Military overthrow of interim President Raimundo Pereira

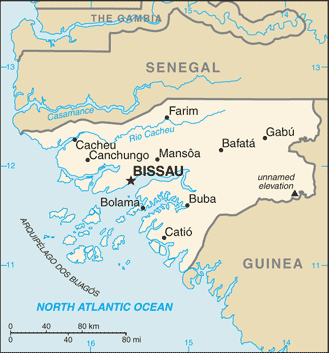
- Map of Guinea-Bissau
Date	12 April 2012
Location	Guinea-Bissau 11°51′50″N 15°35′06″W
Result	Bissau seized by military command; Military command seizes control of state media; Arrest of presidential candidate Carlos Gomes Júnior and interim President Raimundo Pereira; Dissolution of state institutions; Aborted election; Interim transitional government led by Manuel Serifo Nhamadjo, after consensus acting Prime Minister Rui Duarte de Barros

Belligerents
Government of Guinea-Bissau; Civil society; (Guinea-Bissau) Police; (Guinea-Bissau) PAIGC; Angola; (Angola) Angolan Armed Forces	(Guinea-Bissau) National Transitional Council; Military Command

Commanders and leaders
(Guinea-Bissau) Raimundo Pereira (Guinea-Bissau) Adiato Djaló Nandigna (Guinea-Bissau) Carlos Gomes Júnior	(Guinea-Bissau) Mohamed Ialá Embaló; Tcham Na Man (Angola) Cândido Pereira dos Santos Van-Dúnem

Strength
Up to 200 (Angolan troops)	50%+ of the Armed Forces (predominantly Balanta members of the army)

On 12 April 2012, a coup d'état in Guinea-Bissau was staged by elements of the armed forces about two weeks before the second round of a presidential election between Carlos Gomes Júnior and Kumba Ialá. The coup started in the evening with military personnel and equipment making its way onto the streets, followed by the state-owned media being taken off-air.

Both second-round candidates and the incumbent president were initially arrested by the junta. Members of the Military Council, which ran the country until an interim National Transitional Council was established on 15 April, said that one of the reasons for the coup was the incumbent civilian administration's call for Angolan help to reform the military. Following international condemnation and sanctions against leaders of the junta, an agreement was signed that led to the third place candidate in the election, Manuel Serifo Nhamadjo, being selected as interim president. The presidential election was aborted and postponed for at least two years into the future. An interim government was tasked with administering Guinea-Bissau in the meantime.

== Background ==
The media and international think-tanks have highlighted the country's instability and labelled it a narcostate. The country has frequently featured military involvement in civil administration since independence from Portugal in 1974. As such, the events leading up to the 2012 coup include military unrest in 2010 and a failed coup attempt in 2011. The latter followed infighting between the country's Navy and the Army. Guinea-Bissau's instability is also exacerbated as a transit point for drug shipments from Latin America to Europe and allegations exist that government ministers and military personnel are bribed to keep silent.

Following the death of President Malam Bacai Sanhá on 9 January 2012, a new election was scheduled to be held within 90 days in accordance with the constitution. Despite a peaceful campaign, there were external fears of possible violence or a coup d'état if the army did not approve of the winner. In this regard, UN Secretary General Ban Ki-moon called for a "peaceful, orderly and transparent" election. Just before the attack, presidential candidate Kumba Ialá, who claimed to have ties with members of his Balanta ethnic group, who are the largest ethnicity in the military, warned of "consequences" if there was campaigning for the second round of the election due to his allegations of fraud in the first round that were unanswered. The first round result was rejected by five of the nine candidates. Campaigning was due to start on 13 April for the second round, until its disruption as a result of the coup d'état.

Days before the coup, fellow Lusophone country Angola announced its forces would be ending the two-year-old Angolan Military Mission in Guinea Bissau (MISSANG) that followed a similar failed effort by the European Union as part of the United Nations Integrated Peacebuilding Office in Guinea-Bissau (UNIOGBIS). State-owned Angolan news agency ANGOP said that the Angolan troops were sent to Guinea-Bissau in March 2011 in accordance with a bilateral military agreement to reform the armed forces. On 16 April, Guinea-Bissau Defense Minister Jorge Tolentino Araújo was scheduled to arrive in Angola to meet his counterpart Cândido Pereira dos Santos Van-Dúnem and the Army Chief-of-Staff Geraldo Sachipengo Nunda. He was also expected to visit the Higher Warfare School (ESG) and the Higher Technical Military Institute (ISTM). The same day as the coup, the two Lusophone countries of Angola and Cape Verde agreed to review their defense cooperation agreements. Presidential candidate and former Prime Minister Carlos Gomes Júnior was also unpopular with the army for his attempts to reform the institution.

== Rationale ==
According to Portugal's SIC Notícias, a day before the coup an unidentified military commander claimed Gomes Júnior would allow Angolan troops into the country. He also claimed that soldiers possessed a "secret document" that allowed the Guinea-Bissau government to sanction an Angolan attack on Guinea-Bissau's military. The leaders of the junta released an unsigned communique that read they "did not have ambitions of power" and that the coup was a reaction to the alleged agreement with Angola because the 200 military trainers would "annihilate Guinea-Bissau's armed forces." The spokesman for the junta that took over after the coup, Lieutenant-Colonel Daha Bana na Walna later said that Gomes Júnior and Pereira were ousted because of "unease" in the armed forces over the election, a sentiment echoed by diplomats. Gomes Junior was also viewed as the "candidate of Angola" in the election, according to Chatham House's Africa director Alex Vines. He also said that the months leading up to the events featured media commentary and hostility towards Angola.

== Coup d'etat ==
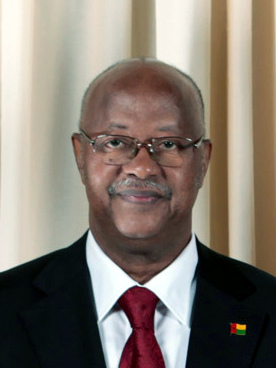
Presidential candidate Carlos Gomes Júnior's house was attacked during the coup and he was later arrested.

On 12 April, gunfire was heard between 19:00 and 21:00, as mutinous troops attempted to overthrow the government by seizing control of the centre of the capital Bissau. Initial reports by diplomats in the country said presidential candidate Carlos Gomes Júnior and interim President Raimundo Pereira were missing. The mutineers seized control of the offices of the incumbent African Party for the Independence of Guinea and Cape Verde (PAIGC) and radio stations. They also fought police officers loyal to the government, forcing them to retreat after coming under fire from RPGs. The soldiers blocked the roads into and out of the capital city and the national radio and television was taken off-air at 20:00.

The perpetrators of the coup targeted Gomes Júnior's residence, which was attacked by grenades and surrounded by troops, as gunfire was heard nearby. Journalists were also prevented from approaching the scene. Camilo Lima da Costa, the son of the head of the national election commission Desejado Lima da Costa, told RDP África, one of the radio stations still broadcasting, that the soldiers had looted his father's house but that both his parents were safe. Soldiers ransacked and looted other houses they raided as well. Soldiers also sealed off the embassies to prevent members of the government from fleeing and hiding with foreign diplomats. Several unnamed politicians were arrested during the night by the army.

Peter Thompson, the head of the U.K. Electoral Observation Mission in the country for the election, described the situation on the night of the coup as "a very large presence of the military in the streets. It did seem quite coordinated last night in terms of how the roads were shut off...Today the streets are very calm, the city is much quieter than it normally would be. People are staying home. I do know that the army has taken control of the state media and state television, and they haven't released anything official." There was speculation on Senegal's RFM radio by reporter Noah Mankali that Gomes Júnior had been assassinated by the army during the night by soldiers from the same Balanta ethnic group as Ialá Embaló.

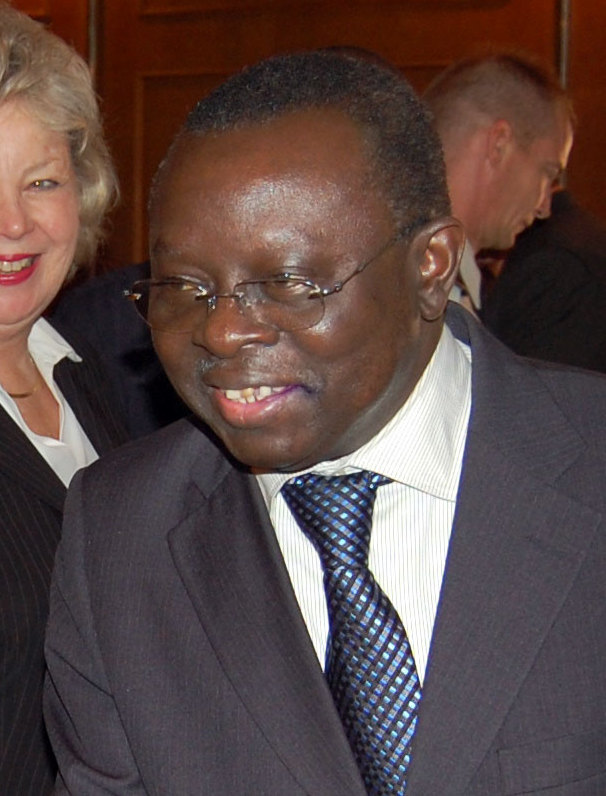
Interim President Raimundo Pereira, who was also arrested during the coup

An unnamed number of government ministers, as well as the Director General of the Judicial Police João Biague, were in hiding. Interior Minister Fernando Gomes, who may have been in the custody of the mutinous soldiers, said he "feared for his life." On 14 April, Lusa journalist Antonio Aly Silva told the outlet that he had been arrested for a short while, but was later released at the same time as singer Dulce Neves and many of Gomes Junior's bodyguards. Senegal closed its land border with Guinea-Bissau on 13 April.

People began to venture out of their homes at dawn and there appeared to be little to no presence of soldiers on the streets and no messages over radio or television from either the government or the coup leaders. There was an "unusual" quiet in Bissau, although photographs showed a big hole in Gomes Júnior's residence as a result of the attack. Soldiers were seen standing guard outside radio and television stations, including the state-run television office, and the presidential offices in Bissau. An overnight curfew was imposed the following day with orders for the members of the civilian government to turn themselves over to the army. Private radio stations were also shut. On 14 April, some businesses started to reopen but they closed early in accordance with the curfew.

== Aftermath and National Unity Government ==
The coup leaders formed the "Military Command" under the leadership of the Deputy Chief of Staff of the Armed Forces General Mamadu Ture Kuruma. The next day, they put forth conditions for a national unity government after having announced the ouster of Gomes Júnior. Its goals were: the removal of obstacles to reforming the security sector; fighting drug trafficking and consumption; overcoming a culture of impunity; and the continuation of enhancing the democratic process.

Interim President Raimundo Pereira and the Chief-of-Staff of the Armed Forces General Antonio Indjai were "under the control of the army," however there were rumours circulating that Indjai could be hiding and that soldiers were going to every embassy looking for him. Indjai's spokesman Daba Naualna said that Periera and Gomes Júnior were "well and alive" and added that "the [army chief-of-staff] thinks, for the sake of the country, that power cannot fall into the streets and decided to have [the military] play its part in seeking solutions with the political class to resolve this crisis." The Military Command later announced that they were also holding Ialá Embaló. The detained officials were later released. The UN later reported that the head of the Supreme Court and the Election Commission were also in hiding, along with three unnamed cabinet ministers.

Senior officers of the army also met the leaders of the political parties and called on them to form the transitional government, but added that the army would control the defence and interior ministries. The meeting was also attended by: Indjai, who was later arrested; the deputy chief-of-staff General Mamadu Ture Kuruma; the heads of the army, air force and navy; the army's spokesman Lieutenant-Colonel Daha Bana na Walna and four colonels. However, there was no one from the incumbent PAIGC. Consultations with 23 parliamentary and extra-parliamentary parties discussed issues such as: a transitional government including, an interim president and head of the National Assembly, as well as a PAIGC-nominated prime minister other than the incumbent and a government of national unity inclusive of all parties; and the dissolution of the National Assembly with a government led by the National Transitional Council (NTC) under interim leadership.

The five leading opposition candidates (Mohamed Ialá Embaló, Manuel Serifo Nhamadjo, Henrique Rosa, Baciro Djá, and Vicente Fernandes) announced at a joint news conference that the boycott of the second round of the election would be in the name of "justice." Agnela Regalla of Union for Change, who also attended the meeting, said that "the military chiefs suggested the idea of new presidential and legislative elections." The spokesman for the coalition of opposition parties, Fernando Vaz, said that discussion continued for a third day and that the grouping had invited PAIGC to participate. After the meeting the coalition agreed upon a set of proposals to put forward to the Military Command for a transitional unity government.

There were some small protests supporting Gomes Júnior in downtown Bissau, although, according to Peter Thompson, soldiers arrested several of the protesters and put roadblocks on the streets. PAIGC, commenting on the transitional government, said that it "rejects any anti-constitutional or anti-democratic proposal of a solution to the crisis," while also calling for the release of those detained. Tensions mounted within PAIGC between factions supporting Gomes Júnior and Nhamadjo. On 15 April, a demonstration of about 30 people at the National Assembly, where talks on a transition government were ongoing, was dispersed by soldiers. The National Union of Workers of Guinea-Bissau, which has a membership of about 8,000 mostly civil servants, called for a general strike the next day.

On 16 April, an agreement, which intentionally excluded PAIGC, was reached with 22 of the 35 opposition parties to set up a National Transitional Council. According to Vaz, the size, composition and mandate period would be determined the following day and then discussed with the Military Command. He also said that existing institutions would be dissolved and that two committees would run the country, one would manage foreign affairs and the other would handle social affairs. The former committee was due to meet the Economic Community of West African States (ECOWAS) the following day. The transitional civilian government will rule up to two years before new elections will be held. National Assembly speaker Manuel Serifo Nhamadjo, who had previously rejected the office of interim president in April 2012, was again selected as interim president on 11 May 2012. Sory Djaló was the speaker of the NTC.

== Reactions ==
=== Domestic ===
At an ECOWAS summit in Ivory Coast convened to discuss the Malian crisis, Foreign Minister Mamadu Saliu Djaló Pires, upon learning of the events unfolding in his country, called for international support as "the situation is serious. The soldiers are occupying the streets. I spoke to the interim Prime Minister [Adiato Djaló Nandigna] and she said she was under fire" and added that the international community should have an "energetic reaction" to the coup. Pires also dismissed claims that Indjai was arrested suggesting that he was, in fact, a part of it (he was also involved in the 2010 military unrest before being appointed chief-of-staff).

=== International ===
==== Supranational ====
During the early hours of the event, the Foreign Minister of Ivory Coast (the host country of ECOWAS) Daniel Kablan Duncan said that the "information indicates to us that there is a coup underway. ECOWAS formally and rigorously condemns such an attempted coup d'etat," he added that "it's sad that after the example of Senegal, where the elections finished so well, that we have, after Mali, a new forceful intervention in Guinea-Bissau. What I can say at this moment is that...the situation won't be accepted by ECOWAS." ECOWAS Commission President Kadré Désiré Ouedraogo issued a statement that read: "The commission firmly denounces this latest incursion by the military into politics and unreservedly condemns the irresponsible act, which has once more demonstrated their penchant to maintain Guinea-Bissau as a failed state." ECOWAS later decided to send a contingent of military personnel in order to provide security. The delegation, which would also include civilians, would be led by Guinean President Alpha Condé. ECOWAS also said the election runoff should go ahead. ECOWAS constitutes a contact group, chaired by Nigeria and comprising delegations from Benin, Cape Verde, Gambia, Guinea, Senegal and Togo, to coordinate its efforts at resolving the crisis. ECOWAS also had a standby force to fill a vacuum that could be left by the departing MISSANG force, as well as considering International Criminal Court recommendations.

The United Nations Security Council (which included the former colonial mother country Portugal) unanimously condemned the coup with a resolution that stated "the forcible seizure of power from the legitimate government of Guinea-Bissau by some elements of its armed forces. [We] firmly denounce this incursion by the military into politics". The President of the UNSC, U.S. Ambassador Susan Rice, said "the [UN] Secretariat urged the international community to address the cycle of violence and impunity in Guinea-Bissau" and also called for "the immediate restoration of civilian authority...[We] note with profound regret that these events are occurring just prior to the launch of the campaign for the second round of the presidential election". Secretary-General Ban Ki-moon said that he was "extremely concerned" about the arrests of the civilian leadership, while his spokesman Martin Nesirky said that Ki-Moon called for the mutineers "to immediately and unconditionally release all detainees and ensure the safety and security of the general population." The UNSC unanimously voted to "restore constitutional order" in the country and approved Resolution 2048 with sanctions, including issuing travel bans on the diplomatic passports, on five members of the military junta on 18 May. The five members sanctioned were: General Antonio Indjai, Major General Mamadu Ture Kuruma, Inspector-General of the Armed Forces General Estêvão na Mena, Chief of Staff of the Air Force Brigadier General Ibraima Camara and MC spokesman Lieutenant Colonel Daha Bana na Walna. In December, the UNSC expressed concern over the transition process back towards civilian administration. The UN recommended steps to ensuring a "way forward" entailed: mediation between national actors, targeted sanctions on the perpetrators, the deployment of training and protections forces in accordance with the ECOWAS/CPLP road map or the recommendation of the incumbent prime minister and foreign minister for a peacekeeping force.

The Community of Portuguese Language Countries (CPLP) called an extraordinary meeting to take place in Lisbon on 14 April. The meeting was to be attended by the foreign ministers of the member countries: Angola's Georges Rebelo Chicoti, Brazil's Antonio Patriota, Guinea-Bissau's Mamadou Djalo Pires, Mozambique's Oldemiro Julio Marques Baloi and Portugal's Paulo Portas. The CPLP also condemned the coup and exhorted the UN, African Union (AU) and ECOWAS to work towards restoring the "constitutional order" of Guinea-Bissau. They further called for a cessation of military actions that threatened the state or the "legality" of Guinea-Bissau. At the CPLP meet in Lisbon, Pires had said that the "persecution is continuing." The CPLP later issued a statement of condemnation and also called for a UN-authorised military intervention saying that it had "take[n] the initiative of...forming an interposition force in Guinea-Bissau, with a mandate defined by the United Nations Security Council" that would seek to maintain "constitutional order, protect civilians and the country's legitimate institutions." It added that it supported the Angolan presence in the country and the initiate would be carried out according to consultations with ECOWAS, the AU and the EU. Rifts developed between ECOWAS and CPLP over the resolution mechanisms. The former, supported by Nigeria, Senegal, Côte d'Ivoire and Burkina Faso, advocated a year-long transitional process; while the later, supported by Portugal and Angola, advocated an immediate resumption of the election.

The African Union Commission's chairperson Jean Ping said that he condemned the "outrageous acts which undermine the efforts to stabilise the situation in Guinea-Bissau and tarnish the image of the country and Africa." In mid-May, Guinea-Bissau was suspended from the AU. A spokesman for the European Union's High Representative of the Union for Foreign Affairs and Security Policy Catherine Ashton said that "the EU has already suspended most of its aid to Guinea-Bissau" and called on the Military Command to release the detained leaders and restore the "legitimate government." Ekmeleddin İhsanoğlu, the Secretary-General of the Organisation of Islamic Cooperation, called the coup a "heinous and unacceptable act", adding that it would hinder security and the democratic process as it had occurred weeks before the runoff. He also called for the detained politicians to be released. Meanwhile, on 24 April the African Union Peace and Security Council ministerial meeting met at its headquarters in Addis Ababa to discuss matters pertaining to resolving the crisis in the country.

==== States ====
Angolan Defense Minister Cândido Pereira dos Santos Van-Dúnem said that Angola will "continue to provide full support [to Guinea-Bissau because of] excellent ties," adding that the withdrawal date for the troops was being discussed. On 1 October, the UN Ambassador Ismael Abraao Gaspar Martins said that it was seeking a solution to "normalisation of constitutional order" through the work of the UNSC, AU, CPLP and ECOWAS.

Angola's Lusa reported that Portugal, the former coloniser, issued advisories to its citizens to stay in their homes It also rejected claims of an "untoward" attitude by Angola. A Foreign Ministry spokesman said that "the Portuguese government is appealing for a halt to the violence and respect for the law." Portas later called for the detained civilian leadership to be released. Defence Minister José Pedro Aguiar-Branco said that the Portuguese military was ready to evacuate its citizens. "It is our responsibility and our job to ensure adequate preparedness in the event that the evacuation be necessary." Portugal also issued a travel warning for its citizens. On 15 April, it was announced that two naval vessels and an aircraft were on their way to somewhere in West Africa ready for a possible evacuation of 4,000–5,000 Portuguese citizens. On 1 October, Portugal's UN Ambassador José Filipe Moraes Cabral echoed the statement of Angola at the same meeting.

Fellow Lusophone countries Brazil and Timor Leste also reacted to the events, with Brazil's Ministry of External Relations expressing their "preoccupation" with the events and saying that it would call for an extraordinary meeting of the UNSC to discuss the issue. Timor Leste's President José Ramos-Horta said that "the situation in Guinea-Bissau, which I have followed over the years, is extraordinarily complex, dangerous, because it can degrade into more violence, and the country is not in a position to afford that new setback in the peace process and its democratisation." He also offered to mediate the crisis. His offer was accepted on 16 April.

Guinean Foreign Minister Edouard Niankoye Lama called for "restoration of peace and stability" and of "all democratic institutions," when speaking at the General debate of the sixty-seventh session of the United Nations General Assembly (UNGA). Liberian President Ellen Johnson Sirleaf also criticised the "unconstitutional unraveling, of democratic governments" at the UNGA. Namibian President Hifikepunye Pohamba said at the UNGA General debate that he denounced the "unconstitutional changes" and praised ECOWAS for its work in trying to resolve the issue. Nigeria also condemned the coup and President Goodluck Jonathan also told the UNGA General debate: "Guinea-Bissau is another flash point of instability in the sub-region in which Nigeria and ECOWAS are engaged. Indeed, the Contact Group, headed by Nigeria was set up by the Authority of Heads of State and Government of ECOWAS to help establish a transitional government with a view to returning that country to political and constitutional order. In furtherance of this objective, Nigeria provided the sum of 10 million US dollars to the Interim Government in Guinea-Bissau to assist in the stabilisation of the country." Russia called for the restoration of the civilian government.

Canada condemned the coup; while the United States' White House Press Secretary Jay Carney said, "We call for the release of all government leaders and urge all parties to reconcile their differences through the democratic process." The United States' embassy issued a statement that read: "It is regrettable that elements of the Bissau-Guinean military have chosen to derail the democratic process in Guinea-Bissau." At a daily press briefing, the State Department spokesman Mark Toner called on all sides of the conflict to "put down their weapons, release government leaders immediately and restore legitimate civilian leadership," adding that it "appeared the junta had taken control of media outlets, as they were off-air and the headquarters of PAIGC and were trying to restrict movement" and that "we regret that they have chosen to disrupt the democratic process, which already was challenged by the opposition's call to boycott the second round of elections." The State Department also issued a travel warning to the country and called on its citizens already in the country "to shelter in place and avoid the downtown area of Bissau."

== Subsequent non-political events ==
On 9 June, the last police and armed forces personnel of the MISSANG mission left the country. In late August, the Commissioner for Natural resources, Environment and Rural Development Ibraima Dieme announced the Union had approved a loan of 15 billion CFA francs to the country for security system reforms. However, the spokesman of the transitional government, Fernando Vaz, also announced that an agreement with Angola Bauxite to build a deepwater port so as to export bauxite would need to be renegotiated as "the agreement signed in 2007 by the government of Carlos Gomes Junior is not fair ... As a result, the terms of the agreement must be reviewed. The transitional government will not accept that Bissau receives 10 percent [of revenues] while Angola Bauxite takes 90 percent." The project, which had been inaugurated in July 2011, had previously stalled prior to the coup as a result of concern over political instability and an environmental impact study that had not yet been published despite passing the deadline. If completed the port at Buba would have a capacity to host three 70-tonne vessels at any given time, while the project as a whole would also lead to the creation of a three million tonne-a-year mine in Boe.

By the end of the year The New York Times reported an increase in drug trafficking in the country and thus calling the events "cocaine coup;" it also cited a U.S. Drug Enforcement Administration employee as saying the country is "probably the worst narco-state that's out there on the continent. [Guinea-Bissau is] a major problem [for the U.S.A.]. People at the highest levels of the military are involved in the facilitation [of trafficking]. In other African countries government officials are part of the problem. In Guinea-Bissau, it is the government itself that is the problem." A sentiment echoed by regional UN staff. The head of the United Nations Office on Drugs and Crime for West and Central Africa Pierre Lapaque also said: "There has clearly been an increase in Guinea-Bissau in the last several months. We are seeing more and more drugs regularly arriving in this country;" while the EU's ambassador to the country Joaquin Gonzalez-Ducay added: "As a country it is controlled by those who formed the coup d'état. They can do what they want to do. Now they have free rein."

== Continued political instability ==
On 21 October, soldiers again attacked an army barracks in what The New York Times said was a coup attempt against the interim government. It also cited the arrest of an unnamed dissident army captain on 27 October as the organiser of the counter-coup attempt and reported that two other unnamed government critics were assaulted and left outside Bissau. Army Chief of Staff General Antonio Indjai laughed off questions that he was the power behind the throne and responded to the criticism in saying: "People say I'm a drug trafficker. Anybody who has the proof, present it! We ask the international community to give us the means to fight drugs." Gonzalez-Ducay then responded: "I can't believe that the one who controls the drug trafficking is going to fight the drug trafficking." The U.S. State Department's Foreign Service Officer for Guinea-Bissau Russell Hanks, who is not present in the country following the U.S. shutting its embassy during the Bissau-Guinean Civil War in 1998, said: "You will only have an impact on this transition by engagement, not by isolation. These are the people who came in to pick up the pieces after the coup." His staff pointed to photographs of newly created stretches of road in a remote rural area near the Senegal border that had space for small planes to land and they suggested was under the supervision of the armed forces. Chief of Guinea-Bissau's judicial police João Biague reported on a dubious aircraft landing months before the coup near Indjai's farm. He also added that "The traffickers know [our judicial authority] can't do much. The agents we have in the field want to give up because they have nothing to eat." Guinea-Bissau's former prosecutor general added: "A country that's not capable of discussing its own problems – it's not a country, it's not a state."

The leader of the coup attempt was Pansau Ntchama, a commando who was the ex-bodyguard of Guinea-Bissau's former army chief of staff. Fernando Vaz said of him: "He is a man with political ambitions living in Portugal. He appeared here in order to carry out this attempted coup ... He flew to Gambia, and then he went to Angola to pick up arms ... He has fled into the bush, but we are confident that we will catch him."

=== Resolution process ===
In response to the UNSC resolution for the restoration of civilian and constitutional rule, Secretary-General Ban Ki-moon appointed Timor-Leste's José Ramos-Horta as his special representative to the country on 31 January 2013, replacing Rwanda's Joseph Mutaboba.
