= Zamora Induta =

Guinea-Bissauan military leader

Chief of Staff of the Revolutionary Armed Forces of the People
- In office October 27, 2009 – April 1, 2010
- Succeeded by: António Indjai

Personal details
- Born: May 28, 1966 (age 59)

Military service
- Branch/service: Revolutionary Navy
- Rank: Rear Admiral

Zamora Induta (born 28 May 1966) is a Guinea-Bissauan military leader He was the Chief of Staff of the Revolutionary Armed Forces of the People of Guinea-Bissau from October 27, 2009 to April 1, 2010.

He was born in Bissau and after leaving school served in the Navy branch of the Revolutionary Armed Forces of the People (Portuguese:Forças Armadas Revolucionarias do Povo, FARP), the armed wing of the African Party for the Independence of Guinea and Cape Verde (Portuguese: Partido Africano da Independência da Guiné e Cabo Verde, PAIGC). PAIGC had been established in 1956 under the leadership of Amilcar Cabral to achieve independence from Portugal, by violent means if necessary.

Many years after independence had been secured and PAIGC had taken power he was arrested and imprisoned for eight months in 2010 by rebel forces during the 2010 Guinea-Bissau military uprising against the PAIGC regime.

He was arrested again in 2012 following the 2012 Guinea-Bissau coup d'état and accused of terrorism against the Guinean state. He was obliged to spend the next few years in exile in Lisbon, not returning to Guinea-Bissau until July 2015.

== See also ==
- 2010 Guinea-Bissau military unrest
