= United People's Alliance =

- Founded: Early 2004
- Dissolved: Late 2004
- Merger of: Guinean People's Party; Socialist Alliance of Guinea
- Ideology: Social democracy Democratic socialism

The United People's Alliance (Portuguese: Aliança Popular Unida, APU) was a political alliance in Guinea-Bissau. It consisted of the Guinean People's Party (PPG) and the Socialist Alliance of Guinea (ASG).

== History ==
The Alliance was formed in early 2004 in order to contest the March 2004 parliamentary elections. It received 1.36% of the vote and won a single seat, taken by Fernando Gomes of the ASG.

The Alliance was dissolved by the end of 2004, and Gomes joined the African Party for the Independence of Guinea and Cape Verde.
