= List of presidents of the National People's Assembly of Guinea-Bissau =

List of presidents of the National People's Assembly of Guinea-Bissau.

This is a list of presidents (speakers) of the National People's Assembly of Guinea-Bissau:

No	Name	Entered office	Left office	Notes	President of Guinea-Bissau:
1	João Bernardo Vieira	1973	1978		Acting President of Guinea-Bissau
–	No Legislative Arm of Government	1980	1984		
2	Carmen Pereira	May 14, 1984	1989		Acting President of Guinea-Bissau
3	Tiago Aleluia Lopes	1989	1994		Acting President of Guinea-Bissau
4	Malam Bacai Sanhá	1994	May 1999		Acting President of Guinea-Bissau
5	Jorge Malú	January 28, 2000	September 14, 2003		Acting President of Guinea-Bissau
–	No Legislature	September 14, 2003	May 7, 2004		
6	Francisco Benante	May 7, 2004	December 22, 2008		Acting President of Guinea-Bissau
7	Raimundo Pereira	December 22, 2008	January 9, 2012		Acting President of Guinea-Bissau
8	Manuel Serifo Nhamadjo	March 3, 2009	September 8, 2009		Acting President of Guinea-Bissau
–	Manuel Serifo Nhamadjo (ad interim)	January 9, 2012	April 12, 2012		Acting President of Guinea-Bissau
9	Ibraima Sori Djaló	May 17, 2012	June 16, 2014		
10	Cipriano Cassamá	June 16, 2014	27 July 2023		
11	Domingos Simões Pereira	27 July 2023	4 December 2023		
–	No Legislature	4 December 2023	Ongoing		
