= Mamadu =

Mamadu is a given name. Notable people with the name include:

- Mamadu Candé (born 1990), Guinea-Bissauan footballer
- Mamadú Iaia Djaló (c. 1962–2021), Guinea-Bissau politician
- Mamadu Ture Kuruma (born 1947), Bissau-Guinean military officer
