= Bubo (disambiguation) =

A bubo is a rounded swelling on the skin of a person afflicted by the bubonic plague.

Bubo may also refer to:

== People ==
- Bubo, Duke of the Frisians (died 734)
- Bubo Barnett (1921–1988), American football tackle and guard
- Bubo Na Tchuto (born 1949), Bissau-Guinean navy admiral

== Fictional characters ==
- Bubo, a character in the television series The Trap Door
- Bubo, short for Buboicullaar, a Star Wars alien from Return of the Jedi who was later featured in Tales From Jabba's Palace as the star of one of many short stories
- Bubo, a Great Horned Owl in the Guardians of Ga'Hoole book series and the 2010 film adaptation Legend of the Guardians: The Owls of Ga'Hoole
- Bubo, Athena's owl (after which she also names the mechanical owl she gifts Perseus) in the 1981 film Clash of the Titans
- Bubo, a Muppet owl on Barrio Sésamo

== Other uses ==
- Bubo (bird), the horned owl and eagle-owl genus
- Bubo (fish trap), type of fish trap used in Brunei, Malaysia, and the Philippines
