= 2011 Guinea-Bissau coup attempt =

Coup d'état attempt in Guinea-Bissau

Date	December 26, 2011
Location	Bissau, Guinea-Bissau
Result	Failure of the coup, 30 arrested including Navy Chief

Belligerents
(Guinea-Bissau) Revolutionary Armed Forces of the People	(Guinea-Bissau) Revolutionary Armed Forces of the People

Commanders and leaders
(Guinea-Bissau) Malam Bacai Sanhá (Guinea-Bissau) Antonio Indjai	(Guinea-Bissau) Bubo Na Tchuto

The 2011 Guinea-Bissau coup attempt was a failed coup d'état by a group of renegade soldiers. Taking place on the morning of December 26, 2011, fighting broke out between two factions in the armed forces with sounds of automatic weapons and rocket fire erupting in the Santa Luzia army base which alarmed residents in the country's capital of Bissau. Officials claim it started when Navy Chief Jose Americo Bubo Na Tchuto sent orders to arrest Army Chief Antonio Injai, who was later freed by his men. Afterwards, the Army Chief in turn arrested the Navy Chief for his involvement in the incident however he denies issuing such orders to his troops, saying he had been "spending nights at home, not in the barracks."

During the early hours of the coup when it was still unclear what was the cause of the trouble, some speculated it was an attack on the military HQ by soldiers demanding better pay while others claimed it was a struggle between the armed forces for control of drug smuggling routes. Prime Minister Carlos Gomes Junior momentarily took refuge in a foreign embassy. Government officials later clarified it was actually an attempt by a group of soldiers trying to overthrow the government during a press conference.

In the end, 30 perpetrators were arrested, among them being the Navy Chief for "masterminding the coup." More skirmishes were executed by the army to make further arrests, including politicians, that resulted in a single casualty along with many more being injured. Guinea-Bissau's government announced plans to establish a commission of inquiry into the foiled coup attempt while African Union chairman Jean Ping expressed concern over the situation and urged dialogue for peace and stability.

Meanwhile, President Malam Bacai Sanhá, who was undergoing medical treatment abroad, was absent during the coup attempt. He later died in January 2012, fueling further political instability in the country.
