= National Union of Workers of Guinea-Bissau =

UNTG
- National Union of Workers of Guinea-Bissau
- União Nacional dos Trabalhadores de Guiné
- Headquarters: Bissau, Guinea-Bissau
- Location: Guinea-Bissau
- Key people: Desejado Lima da Costa, general secretary
- Affiliations: ITUC

The National Union of Workers of Guinea-Bissau (UNTG) is a national trade union center in Guinea-Bissau. It consists of 15 unions and a Working Women Commission. It is affiliated with the International Trade Union Confederation.
