= United Nations Security Council Resolution 1233 =

UN Security Council Resolution 1233
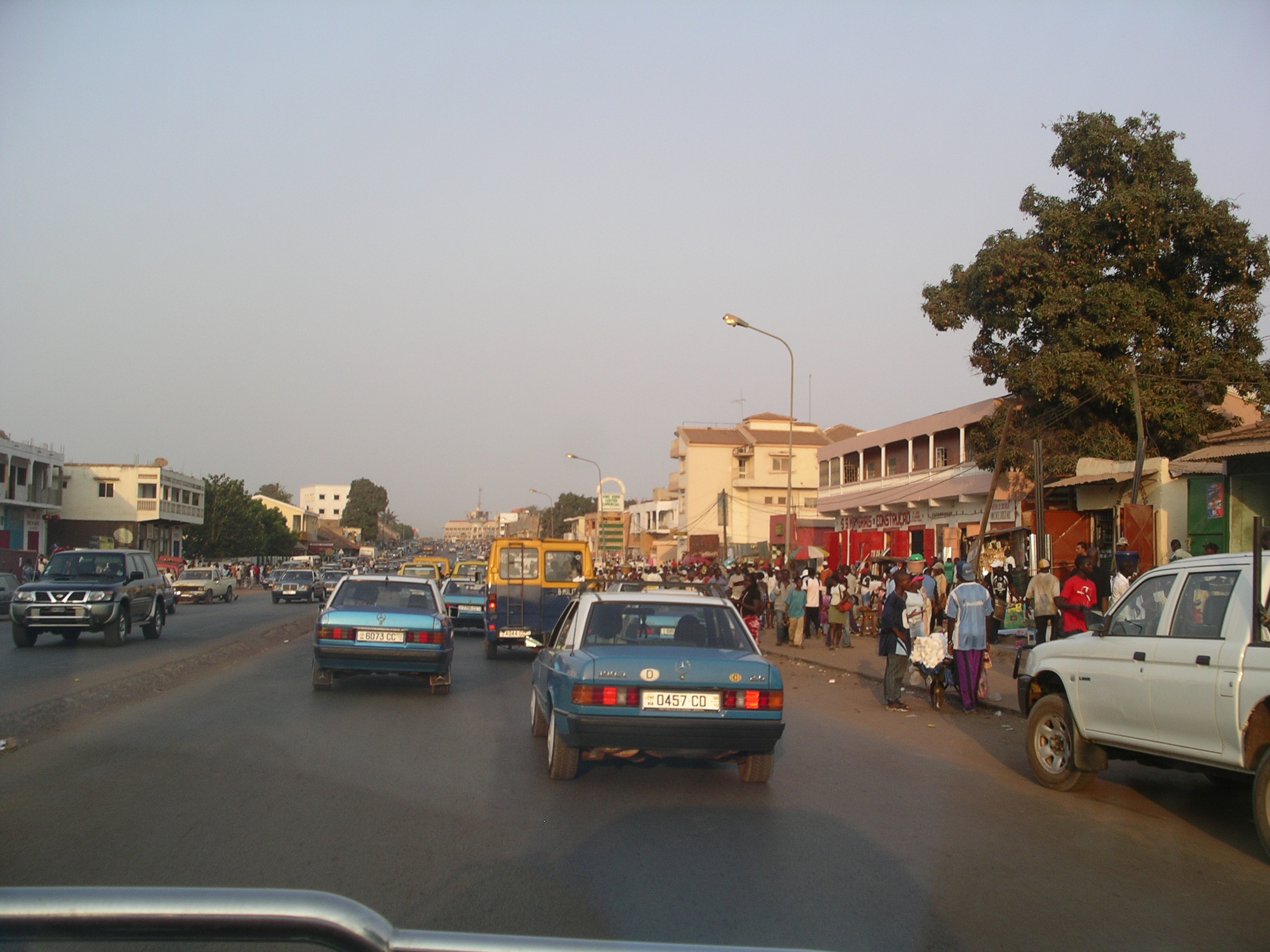
- Bissau, capital of Guinea-Bissau
- Date: 6 April 1999
- Meeting no.: 3,991
- Code: S/RES/1233 (Document)
- Subject: The situation in Guinea-Bissau
- Voting summary: 15 voted for; None voted against; None abstained
- Result: Adopted

Security Council composition
- Permanent members: China; France; Russia; United Kingdom; United States
- Non-permanent members: Argentina; Bahrain; Brazil; Canada; Gabon; Gambia; Malaysia; Namibia; Netherlands; Slovenia

United Nations Security Council resolution 1233, adopted unanimously on 6 April 1999, after reaffirming Resolution 1216 (1998) on the situation in Guinea-Bissau, the council established the United Nations Peacebuilding Support Office in Guinea-Bissau (UNOGBIS) to facilitate the implementation of the Abuja Accord.

In the preamble of the Resolution 1223, the security council continued to express concern over the humanitarian situation in Guinea-Bissau. It noted declarations by the President of Guinea-Bissau João Bernardo Vieira and the leader of the self-proclaimed military junta of never again resorting to the use of weapons and welcomed the swearing-in of a new Government of National Unity. The council noted that there serious obstacles remaining, partly due to the failure of civil servants and other officials to return to Guinea-Bissau from other countries. It welcomed the deployment of troops from the Economic Community of West African States Monitoring Group (ECOMOG) and reiterated the need to conduct general and presidential elections as soon as possible in accordance with the Abuja Agreement.

The parties were commended for the steps they had taken so far in the peace process and were asked to take measures for a smooth functioning of the government and the return of refugees. They were called upon to promptly agree on the date for the holding of free, fair and inclusive elections.

Supporting a decision of the Secretary-General Kofi Annan, the Council authorised the establishment of UNOGBIS to co-ordinate United Nations activities in Guinea-Bissau during the transitional period leading up to general and presidential elections in addition to the implementation of the Abuja Accord, in co-operation with the ECOMOG, the Economic Community of West African States (ECOWAS) and international organisations.

The resolution reiterated the requirement for the disarmament and encampment of ex-belligerent troops and welcomed the progress made by ECOMOG in this regard; the demining of areas to facilitate the return of refugees was also a necessity. The council urged all parties to respect international law, particularly with regard to operations by United Nations and humanitarian personnel. It welcomed a United Nations Development Programme-sponsored conference that was to be held in Geneva on 4–5 May 1999 to mobilise assistance for Guinea-Bissau.

Finally, the secretary-general was required to submit a report to the council by 30 June 1999 and every 90 days thereafter on developments relating to Guinea-Bissau, the Abuja Accord, UNOGBIS and ECOMOG.

== See also ==
- Guinea-Bissau Civil War
- History of Guinea-Bissau
- List of United Nations Security Council Resolutions 1201 to 1300 (1998–2000)
