= Manuel Serifo Nhamadjo =

Acting president of Guinea-Bissau (2012–2014)

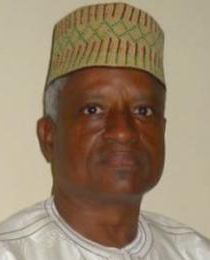
- Nhamadjo in 2015

President of Guinea-Bissau Acting
- In office 11 May 2012 – 23 June 2014
- Prime Minister: Rui Duarte de Barros (Acting)
- Preceded by: Mamadu Ture Kuruma (as Chairman of the Military Command)
- Succeeded by: José Mário Vaz

President of the National People's Assembly Acting
- In office 9 January 2012 – 12 April 2012
- Preceded by: Raimundo Pereira
- Succeeded by: Vacant; Cipriano Cassamá (2014)
- In office 3 March 2009 – 8 September 2009
- Preceded by: Raimundo Pereira
- Succeeded by: Raimundo Pereira

Personal details
- Born: 25 March 1958 Bissau, Portuguese Guinea
- Died: 17 March 2020 (aged 61) Lisbon, Portugal
- Party: PAIGC (Before 2012); Independent (2012–2020)

Manuel Serifo Nhamadjo (25 March 1958 – 17 March 2020) was a Bissau-Guinean politician who served as president of the National People's Assembly of Guinea-Bissau. He was a candidate in the abortive 2012 presidential election, placing third in the first round. Following the April 2012 military coup, he was designated as acting president as part of a transitional arrangement.

Political offices
Preceded by Raimundo Pereira	President of the National People's Assembly; Acting; 2008–2009	Succeeded by Raimundo Pereira
Preceded by Raimundo Pereira	President of the National People's Assembly; Acting; 2012	Vacant
Preceded by Mamadu Ture Kuruma as Chairman of the Military Command of Guinea-Bissau	President of Guinea-Bissau; Acting; 2012–2014	Succeeded by José Mário Vaz
