= Guinean People's Party =

Extinct political party in Guinea-Bissau

The Guinean People's Party (Portuguese: Partido Popular Guineense, PPG) was a small political party in Guinea-Bissau.

== History ==
The party was established by João Tátis Sá following his unsuccessful candidacy in the 1999–2000 presidential elections. It joined the United People's Alliance for the 2004 parliamentary elections, which won a single seat in the National People's Assembly.

Sá ran for president again in 2005, but finished last in a field of 13 candidates.
