= Mamadu Ture Kuruma =

Military leader of Guinea-Bissau in 2012

Major General Mamadu Ture Kuruma

Chairman of the Military Command of Guinea-Bissau
- In office 12 April 2012 – 11 May 2012
- Preceded by: Raimundo Pereira (as Acting President)
- Succeeded by: Manuel Serifo Nhamadjo (as Acting President)

Personal details
- Born: 26 April 1947 (age 78)
- Political party: Independent

Military service
- Allegiance: Guinea-Bissau
- Branch/service: Revolutionary Armed Forces of the People
- Rank: Major general

Major General Mamadu Ture Kuruma (or N'Krumah; born 26 April 1947) is a Bissau-Guinean military vice-chief of staff and the leader of the Military Command that took power following a coup against acting president Raimundo Pereira and former prime minister and leading candidate for president Carlos Gomes Júnior. On 13 April, he promised to form a national unity government within days. On 18 May 2012, the United Nations Security Council adopted a resolution on the travel ban for members of the Military Command, including Kuruma.

Political offices
Preceded by Raimundo Pereira as Acting President of Guinea-Bissau	Chairman of the Military Command of Guinea-Bissau; 2012	Succeeded by Manuel Serifo Nhamadjo as Acting President of Guinea-Bissau
