= United Nations Integrated Peacebuilding Office in Guinea-Bissau =

- Abbreviation: UNIOGBIS
- Formation: 2009
- Type: Special political mission
- Legal status: Accomplished
- Head: Special Representative of the UN Secretary General (SRSG), Rosine Sori-Coulibaly
- Parent organization: United Nations Security Council
- Website: https://uniogbis.unmissions.org/en

The United Nations Integrated Peacebuilding Office in Guinea-Bissau (UNIOGBIS) is a United Nations peacebuilding mission in Guinea-Bissau.

It was established by Resolution 1876 of the United Nations Security Council in 2009 and succeeded the United Nations Peacebuilding Support Office in Guinea-Bissau (UNOGBIS). It is tasked with promoting stability in the country.

== See also ==
- History of Guinea-Bissau
