= Francisco Benante =

Bissau-Guinean politician

Francisco Benante (born 1954?) is a Bissau-Guinean politician. He was President of the African Party for the Independence of Guinea and Cape Verde (PAIGC) from 1999 to 2002 and President of the National People's Assembly of Guinea-Bissau from 2004 to 2008.

== Life and career ==
Benante is a lawyer by profession. In the government of national unity formed in the midst of the Guinea-Bissau Civil War, Benante was chosen as Minister of Defense by the junta in January 1999. He was the only civilian member of the junta. Following the ouster of President Nino Vieira (who was also President of PAIGC) in May 1999, Benante, as the leader of reformists within PAIGC, was elected as the President of PAIGC on 9 September 1999, at the end of a party congress. Benante's candidacy was supported by the junta, and he received 174 votes against 133 votes for the only opposing candidate.

Following an alleged coup attempt against President Kumba Yala on 2 December 2001, Benante said that soldiers searched his home for no reason on 3 December. The opposition questioned the existence of this coup attempt, and Benante demanded that concrete evidence be presented. Carlos Gomes Júnior was elected to replace Benante as PAIGC President at a party congress in January–February 2002.

In the March 2004 parliamentary election, Benante was elected to the National People's Assembly. He was then a candidate for the post of President of the National People's Assembly and was endorsed in a vote held by the PAIGC Central Committee in April 2004; he received 106 votes against 71 votes for PAIGC First Vice-President Aristides Gomes and 63 for PAIGC campaign director Soares Sambu.

Prior to the November 2008 parliamentary election, Benante urged President Vieira not to dissolve the National People's Assembly or appoint a new government in a discussion on 4 August 2008, citing the proximity of the election. In the election, Benante was re-elected to the National People's Assembly as a PAIGC candidate in the 21st constituency, Cacheu e Sao Domingos. Following the election, at a meeting of the PAIGC Central Committee on 6 December 2008, PAIGC Second Vice-President Raimundo Pereira was elected as the party's candidate for the post of President of the National People's Assembly, defeating Benante and Hélder Proença. Benante criticized the outcome, arguing that the voting method used by the Central Committee was illegal. Pereira was officially elected as President of the National People's Assembly when the newly elected deputies met later in the month, succeeding Benante.
