= Desejado Lima da Costa =

President of the national election commission of Guinea-Bissau

Desejado Lima da Costa was the president of the national election commission of Guinea-Bissau. After the 2012 Guinea-Bissau coup d'état, his son Camilo Lima da Costa told RDP Africa, that the soldiers had looted his father's house but that both his parents were safe. A few months later, on 22 October 2012, Desejado Lima da Costa died in Lisbon.
