= Joseph Mutaboba =

Joseph Mutaboba is the African Union and United Nations Deputy Joint Special Representative in Darfur and Deputy Head of the African Union-United Nations Hybrid Operation (UNAMID). He was appointed to this position by United Nations Secretary-General Ban Ki-moon and the Chairperson of the African Union Commission, Mrs. Nkosazana Dlamini Zuma, on 20 June 2013.

== Biography ==
Born in 1949, Mutaboba is a native of Rwanda. He obtained a Master of Philosophy from North London University.

Prior to this appointment, Mutaboba held various high ranking positions in Rwanda, including as the Rwandan President’s Special Envoy to the Great Lakes Region, and as Secretary-General in the Ministries of Foreign Affairs and Internal Affairs. He was the Permanent Representative of Rwanda to the United Nations from 1999 to 2001. His most recent position was United Nations Secretary-General's Special Envoy to Guinea-Bissau

He is fluent in English and French and knows Spanish, Portuguese and Italian.
