= 2010 Guinea-Bissau military unrest =

Event in West Africa

Date	1 April 2010
Location	Bissau, Guinea-Bissau 11.864°N 15.585°W
Result	Prime Minister Carlos Gomes Junior and Army Chief of Staff Zamora Induta was placed under house arrest by soldiers

Belligerents
Guinea-Bissau: Prime Minister of the Republic of Guinea-Bissau; PAIGC Revolutionary Armed Forces of the People (faction)	Revolutionary Armed Forces of the People (faction)

Commanders and leaders
(Guinea-Bissau) Carlos Gomes Junior (POW) (Guinea-Bissau) Zamora Induta (POW)	(Guinea-Bissau) Antonio Indjai

Strength
Unknown	Unknown

Casualties and losses
Unknown	Unknown
- Unknown
- Location within Guinea-Bissau

The military unrest occurred in Guinea-Bissau on 1 April 2010. Prime Minister Carlos Gomes Junior was placed under house arrest by soldiers, who also detained Army Chief of Staff Zamora Induta. Supporters of Gomes and his party, PAIGC, reacted to the move of the military by demonstrating in the capital, Bissau; Antonio Indjai, the Deputy Chief of Staff, then warned that he would have Gomes killed if the protests continued.

== Events of 1 April ==
In the morning of 1 April 2010, Prime Minister Carlos Gomes Junior's office was besieged by soldiers. Gomes was detained by the soldiers and moved to a military camp, although he was taken to his home later in the day and kept there under guard. Zamora Induta, the Army Chief of Staff, was also detained and held at the camp. Admiral Bubo Na Tchuto, who had taken refuge at the United Nations compound in Bissau 95 days beforehand due to allegations of a coup plot, was picked up from the compound by soldiers and promptly emerged as one of their leaders.

After Gomes was taken by the soldiers, hundreds of his supporters demonstrated near his office and then his home, protesting the soldiers' actions. At a news conference, the Deputy Chief of Staff of the Army, Antonio Ndjai, warned the demonstrators that he would have Gomes killed unless they stopped their protest. He also characterized Gomes as a "criminal" who should be put on trial. Na Tchuto, meanwhile, expressed contempt for the protesters, saying that they had failed to show any support for himself while he was stuck in the UN compound: "I spent 11 years fighting for Guinea-Bissau's independence. Gomes did not take part in that fight. If the population continues to go out into the streets, I will send the military to clean the streets." The protesters subsequently dispersed, apparently heeding the warnings.

Despite his initial, bellicose statements, Ndjai adopted a less confrontational tone later in the day, describing the events as "a purely military problem" and saying that they "do not concern the civil government". He also stressed that "military institutions remain, and will remain, submissive to political power." President Malam Bacai Sanha characterized the events in a similar fashion and said that he would seek "a friendly solution to this problem".

== Subsequent events ==
The situation was less tense by 2 April, and the radio was no longer playing the martial music which had initially been interpreted as signifying a coup attempt. The government held a meeting and condemned the soldiers' treatment of Gomes. Subsequently, the soldiers took Gomes to meet with President Sanha; after the meeting, Gomes declared that he would not resign. He appeared to downplay the situation, describing it as an "incident" and saying that "institutions will return to their normal functions."

A delegation headed by presidential adviser Mario Cabral visited Induta, who remained in detention at a barracks, on 3 April. According to Cabral, Induta was "being treated well and is fine". Prime Minister Gomes left Guinea-Bissau in late April 2010 and went to Portugal, where he remained for several months; his extended stay in Portugal was officially explained as being related to his health. He eventually returned to Bissau on 16 June. Upon his return, he vowed that he and his government would remain in office and that he would not resign; he said that he could be removed only through a PAIGC extraordinary congress. While describing himself as a "factor for stability", he said that his efforts to "end the political crisis" depended on "the goodwill of people who are trying at all costs to plunge the country into chaos". Gomes met with Indjai, who subsequently said that he and Gomes could cooperate and "everything has now been smoothed out."
