= Algiers Accord (1974) =

1974 treaty between Portugal and PAIGC

- Signed: August 26, 1974
- Location: Algiers, Algeria
- Signatories: Portugal; PAIGC
- Languages: Portuguese

The Algiers Accord (Portuguese: Acordo de Algiers) was signed in Algiers, Algeria, on 26 August 1974, between the African Party for the Independence of Guinea and Cape Verde (PAIGC) and the Portuguese government that had been installed by the Carnation Revolution in Lisbon. In the agreement, Portugal agreed to recognize Guinea-Bissau's independence and a transfer of power of the 125 enclaves still controlled by the Portuguese army to the PAIGC. The two states also agreed to an independence referendum for Cape Verde and a withdrawal of all Portuguese troops by the end of October 1974.

== Content ==
The treaty consisted of several articles including:

- Article I: De jure recognition of the Republic of Guinea-Bissau
- Article II: The Portuguese evacuation and implementation of peace
- Article III: The Portuguese military withdrawal from Guinea Bissau
- Article IV: Measures of co-operation between the two states
- Article V: Formation of diplomatic relations between Portugal and Guinea Bissau
- Article VI: The Portuguese government accepts the right of self-determination and independence for the people of Cape Verde
- Article VII: The Portuguese government and the PAIGC consider the independence of Cape Verde to be necessary for durable peace

== See also ==
- Carnation Revolution
- Armed Forces Movement
- Portuguese Colonial War
- Alvor Agreement
