= United Nations Security Council Resolution 1876 =

UN Security Council Resolution 1876
- Date: 26 June 2009
- Meeting no.: 6,152
- Code: S/RES/1876 (Document)
- Subject: Extends the mandate of the United Nations Peacebuilding Support Office in Guinea-Bissau until 31 December 2009
- Voting summary: 15 voted for; None voted against; None abstained
- Result: Adopted

Security Council composition
- Permanent members: China; France; Russia; United Kingdom; United States
- Non-permanent members: Austria; Burkina Faso; Costa Rica; Croatia; Japan; Libya; Mexico; Turkey; Uganda; Vietnam

United Nations Security Council Resolution 1876 was unanimously adopted on 26 June 2009.

== Resolution ==
The Security Council today extended the mandate of the United Nations Peacebuilding Support Office in Guinea-Bissau (UNOGBIS) until 31 December and requested the Secretary-General to establish a United Nations Integrated Peacebuilding Office in Guinea-Bissau (UNIOGBIS) to succeed it for an initial period of 12 months after that.

Unanimously adopting resolution 1876 (2009), the Council underlined the importance of establishing a fully integrated office with effective coordination of strategies and programmes between United Nations agencies, funds and programmes, between the United Nations and international donors, and between UNIOGBIS, the Economic Community of West African States (ECOWAS) and other United Nations missions in the region.

The Council urged Guinea-Bissau's political leaders to refrain from involving the military in politics, and requested them to use legal and peaceful means to solve their differences. It called on the Government of Guinea-Bissau to conduct credible and transparent investigations into the political assassinations in March and June and to bring to justice those responsible.

On 23 June, the Council heard a briefing on the situation in Guinea-Bissau by Joseph Mutaboba, Representative of the Secretary-General and Head of UNOGBIS.

== See also ==
- List of United Nations Security Council Resolutions 1801 to 1900 (2008–2009)
