= Cipriano Cassamá =

Bissau-Guinean politician

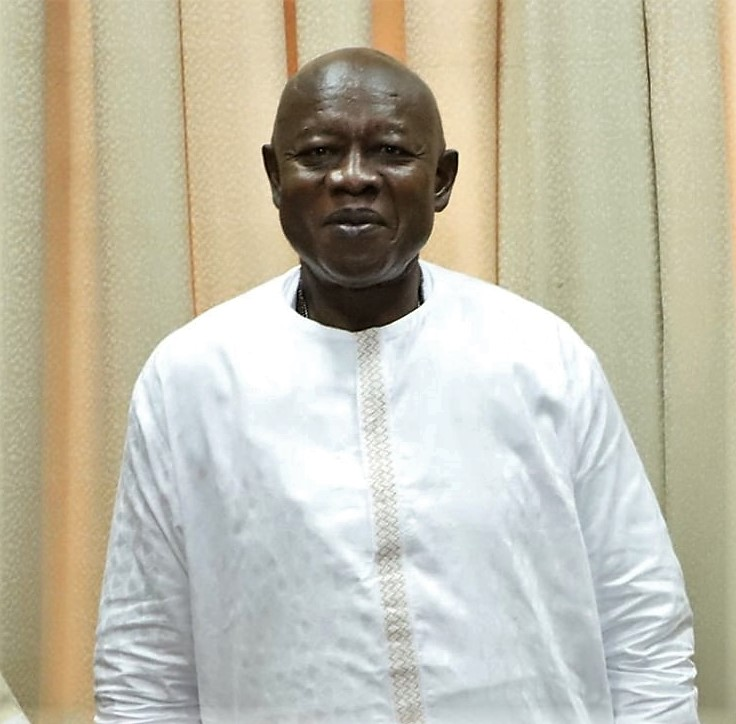

Acting President of Guinea-Bissau
- In office 27 June 2019 – 29 June 2019
- Preceded by: José Mário Vaz
- Succeeded by: José Mário Vaz

President of the National People’s Assembly
- In office 16 June 2014 – 27 July 2023
- Preceded by: Ibraima Sori Djaló
- Succeeded by: Domingos Simões Pereira

Personal details
- Born: 1959 (age 66–67) Bula, Portuguese Guinea, now (Guinea-Bissau)

Cipriano Cassamá (born 1959) is a politician in Guinea-Bissau and a member of the African Party for the Independence of Guinea and Cape Verde (PAIGC). He was Minister of the Interior from August 2008 to January 2009. He has been President of the National People’s Assembly since June 2014.

== Life and career ==
Cassamá was President Nino Vieira's spokesman at the time of the 1998–1999 civil war. After Prime Minister Francisco Fadul compared Vieira to Antonio de Oliveira Salazar during a visit to Portugal on April 19, 1999, Cassamá criticized Fadul for the use of "purposely offensive, aggressive language". Following the civil war, in which Vieira was ousted, Cassamá was arrested along with Conduto de Pina in early February 2000 for allegedly inciting war and supporting foreign occupation. He was later charged with embezzlement along with a number of others who had served under Vieira, but was acquitted by the Regional Court in Bissau in early June 2003. He subsequently served as President of the PAIGC Parliamentary Group. Although PAIGC repudiated Vieira, Cassamá was among those who welcomed Vieira back to Bissau when he returned from exile on April 7, 2005.

On March 17, 2008, Cassamá presented his candidacy to stand for the post of President of PAIGC at the next party congress, saying that he could renew and reunite the party. He was considered a dissident within the party. At PAIGC's Seventh Ordinary Congress, which was held in Gabú, Carlos Gomes Júnior was re-elected as PAIGC President on July 1–2, 2008; Cassamá was a candidate, but received only 61 votes, placing fourth.

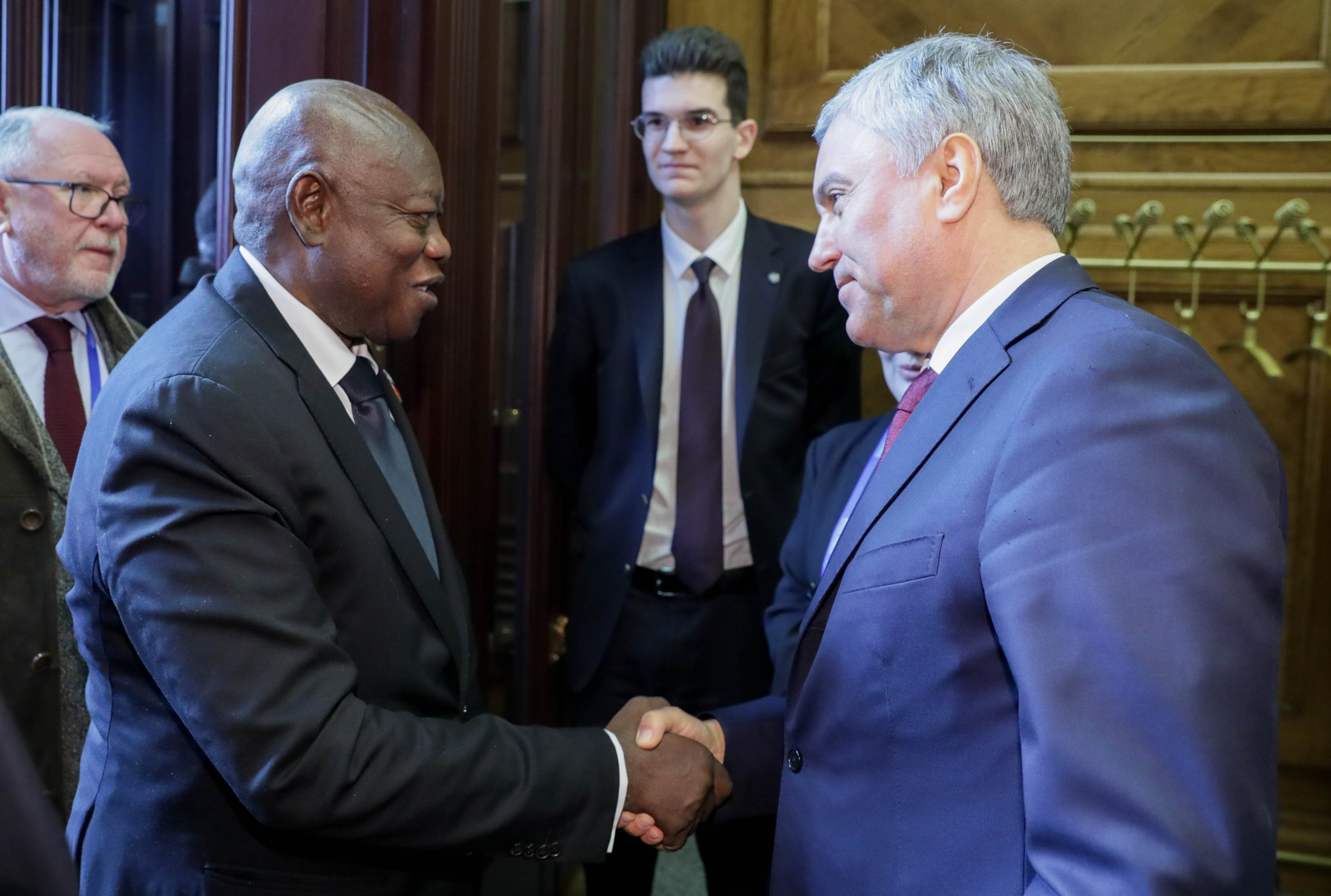
Cassamá and Vyacheslav Volodin in Moscow, Russia on 20 March 2023

Cassamá was appointed as Minister of the Interior on August 9, 2008, in the government of Prime Minister Carlos Correia. His appointment as Interior Minister was considered particularly important because of the ministry's responsibility for handling the November 2008 parliamentary election. In that election, PAIGC won a majority of 67 out of 100 seats in the National People's Assembly, and Cassamá was elected to a seat as a PAIGC candidate in the 10th constituency, Safim e Prabis.

Following an alleged attack by "elements of the presidential guard" against the Armed Forces Chief of Staff, General Batista Tagme Na Wai, on January 4, 2009, Tagme Na Wai accused Cassamá of ordering the attack. A presidential guard spokesman said that a rifle had accidentally gone off and that no assassination attempt had occurred. Cassamá was not included in the PAIGC government that was appointed on January 7, 2009; Lúcio Soares was appointed to replace him as Interior Minister.

He has been chairing the CPLP Parliamentary Assembly since July 2021.

Political offices
Preceded by Ibraima Sori Djaló	President of the National People’s Assembly; 2014–2023	Succeeded by Domingos Simões Pereira
