= Bubo Na Tchuto =

Guinea-Bissau Navy admiral (born 1949)

José Américo Bubo Na Tchuto (born 12 June 1949 Incalá, Tombali Region, Guinea-Bissau) is an admiral in the Navy of Guinea-Bissau. He was previously Chief of Staff of the Navy. On August 6, 2008, he was behind a failed coup attempt against President João Bernardo Vieira. He fled to the Gambia after the coup before returning to Guinea Bissau in 2009 following Vieira's assassination.

== Arrest ==
Bubo Na Tchuto was captured in international waters near Cape Verde on 2 April 2013 during an operation by North American and Cape Verdian police, and extradited to the United States for trial in the United States District Court for the Southern District of New York. He was charged on 5 April with conspiring to import drugs into the U.S., while several co-conspirators were charged with conspiring to engage in narco-terrorism, import drugs into the U.S., and provide aid to FARC by storing its cocaine in West Africa. According to prosecutors, Bubo na Tchuto suggested the time was ripe to use Guinea-Bissau to smuggle contraband after the 2012 Guinea-Bissau coup d'etat.
