= Raimundo Pereira =

Interim President of Guinea-Bissau (2009, 2012)

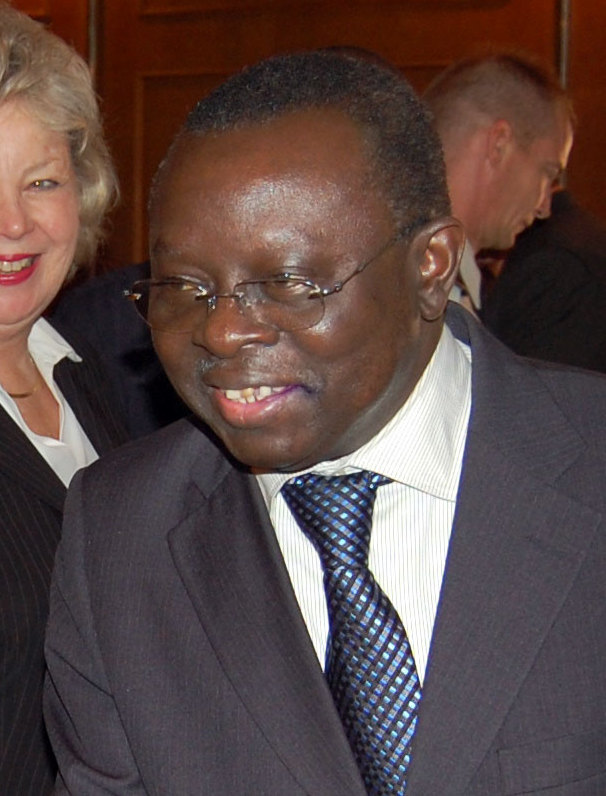
- Pereira in 2009

President of Guinea-Bissau Acting
- In office 9 January 2012 – 12 April 2012
- Prime Minister: Carlos Gomes; Adiato Djaló Nandigna (Acting)
- Preceded by: Malam Bacai Sanhá
- Succeeded by: Mamadu Ture Kuruma (Chairman of the Military Command)
- In office 3 March 2009 – 8 September 2009
- Prime Minister: Carlos Gomes
- Preceded by: João Bernardo Vieira
- Succeeded by: Malam Bacai Sanhá

President of the National People's Assembly
- In office 8 September 2009 – 9 January 2012
- Preceded by: Manuel Serifo Nhamadjo (Acting)
- Succeeded by: Manuel Serifo Nhamadjo (Acting)
- In office 22 December 2008 – 3 March 2009
- Preceded by: Francisco Benante
- Succeeded by: Manuel Serifo Nhamadjo (Acting)

Personal details
- Born: Raimundo Rodrigues Pereira; August 28, 1956 (age 69) Bissau, Portuguese Guinea (now Guinea-Bissau)
- Party: PAIGC
- Occupation: Lawyer

Raimundo Rodrigues Pereira (born 28 August 1956) is a Bissau-Guinean lawyer and politician who was interim President of Guinea-Bissau from 3 March 2009 to 8 September 2009 and again in 2012, following the departure of President Malam Bacai Sanhá for medical treatment abroad; he continued in that capacity after Sanha's death. Pereira was elected as President of the National People's Assembly on 22 December 2008. Pereira is a member of the African Party for the Independence of Guinea and Cape Verde (PAIGC). He was ousted in a coup on 12 April 2012 and succeeded by Mamadu Ture Kuruma.

== Personal life ==
Pereira was born in Bissau; he is a lawyer by training.

== Political career ==
In the November 2008 legislative election, in which PAIGC won a parliamentary majority, Pereira was elected to the National People's Assembly as a PAIGC candidate in the 28th constituency, located in Bissau, the capital. He was chosen by PAIGC to replace Francisco Benante (also a PAIGC member) as President of the National People's Assembly after the election, and accordingly, on 22 December 2008 he was elected as President of the National People's Assembly. He received 60 votes, while a rival PAIGC candidate, Helder Proença, received 37.

=== Presidency ===
Following the assassination of President João Bernardo Vieira by the army on 2 March 2009, the army stated that Pereira, as President of the National People's Assembly, would succeed Vieira as President of Guinea-Bissau on an interim basis, in accordance with the constitution.

Pereira was sworn in on 3 March 2009; according to the constitution, he had 60 days to organize a presidential election. Prime Minister Carlos Gomes Junior and an Economic Community of West African States (ECOWAS) delegation were present for his swearing in. On that occasion, Pereira urged the international community to help Guinea-Bissau "regain the reflexes of a stable state". The opposition Social Renovation Party (PRS) criticized Pereira's succession, arguing that "a debate open to all active forces in the country in an appropriate forum like parliament to reflect on the kind of state to set up" would have been preferable. At Vieira's funeral on 10 March, Pereira said that meeting the 60-day deadline for holding a new election was "one of our greatest challenges."

Pereira sought the PAIGC nomination for the presidential election, but on 25 April 2009, the PAIGC Central Committee chose Malam Bacai Sanhá, who was interim President of Guinea-Bissau from 1999 to 2000, as the party's presidential candidate. He received 144 votes, while Pereira received 118. Sanhá went on to win the election and succeeded Pereira on 8 September 2009.

== 2012 coup d'état ==
On 12 April 2012, Pereira was ousted in a coup and succeeded by Mamadu Ture Kuruma, Chairman of the Military Command of Guinea-Bissau. Pereira and Prime Minister Carlos Gomes Júnior were arrested by the military as gunfire ensued in the capital of Bissau. The Chairperson of the African Union Jean Ping issued a statement rejecting the coup and demanded the release of Pereira and Gomes. The United Nations Security Council issued a statement saying that they "strongly condemn the forcible seizure of power".

On 27 April 2012, the deposed leaders were freed and sent to the Ivory Coast.

Political offices
Preceded by Francisco Benante	President of the National People's Assembly; 2008–2009	Succeeded by Manuel Serifo Nhamadjo; Acting
Preceded by João Bernardo Vieira	President of Guinea-Bissau; Acting; 2009	Succeeded by Malam Bacai Sanhá
Preceded by Manuel Serifo Nhamadjo; Acting	President of the National People's Assembly; 2009–2012	Succeeded by Manuel Serifo Nhamadjo; Acting
Preceded by Malam Bacai Sanhá	President of Guinea-Bissau; Acting; 2012	Succeeded by Mamadu Ture Kuruma as Chairman of the Military Command of Guinea-Bissau
