= Fernando Gomes (Bissau-Guinean politician) =

Bissau-Guinean politician

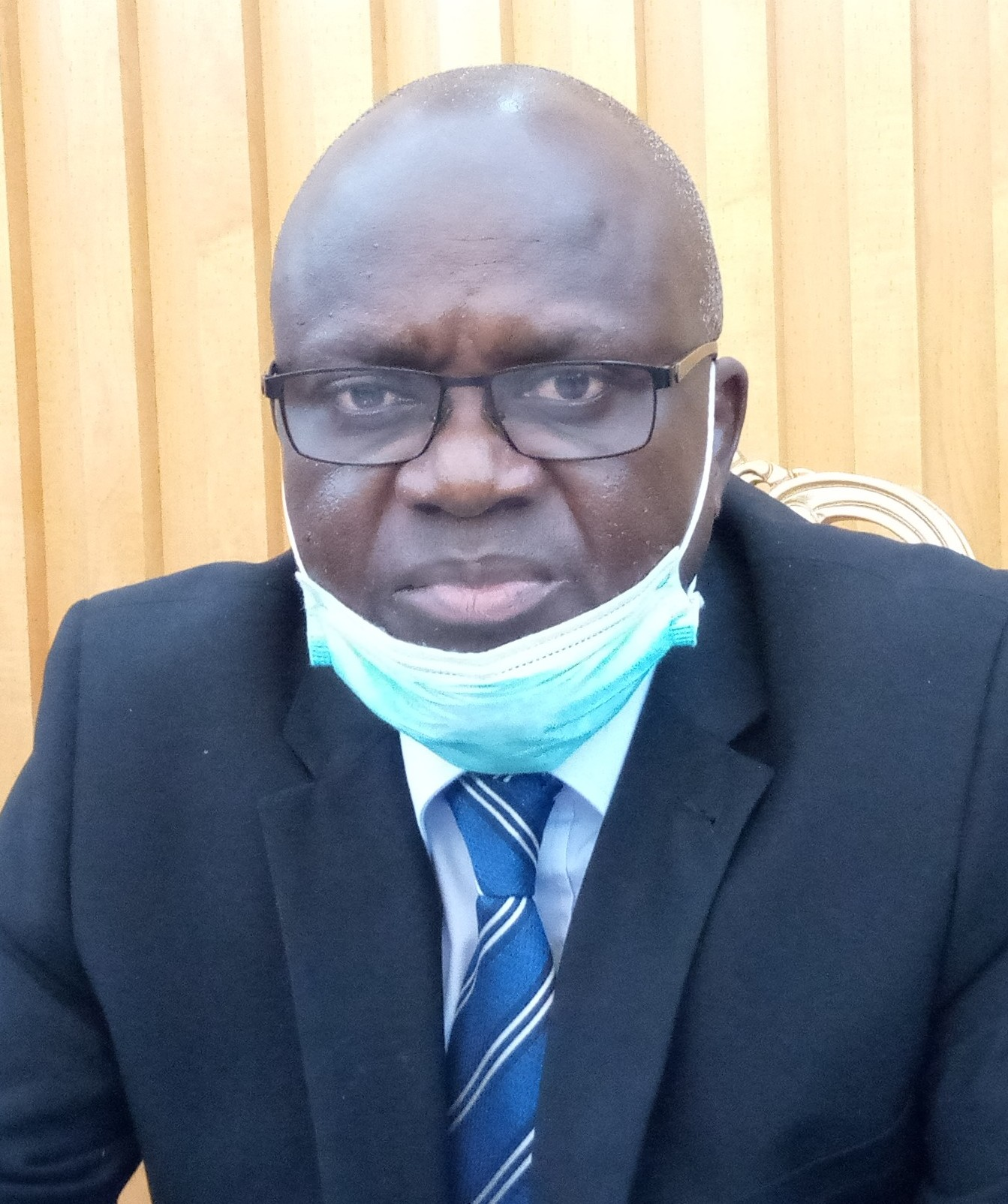
Gomes in 2020

Fernando Gomes is a Bissau-Guinean politician who was the former interior minister of Guinea-Bissau. He was replaced after the 2012 Guinea-Bissau coup d'état.
