= United Nations Security Council Resolution 1216 =

UN Security Council Resolution 1216
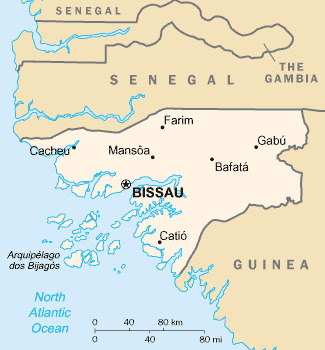
- Guinea-Bissau
- Date: 21 December 1998
- Meeting no.: 3,958
- Code: S/RES/1216 (Document)
- Subject: The situation in Guinea-Bissau
- Voting summary: 15 voted for; None voted against; None abstained
- Result: Adopted

Security Council composition
- Permanent members: China; France; Russia; United Kingdom; United States
- Non-permanent members: Bahrain; Brazil; Costa Rica; Gabon; Gambia; Japan; Kenya; Portugal; Slovenia; Sweden

United Nations Security Council resolution 1216 was adopted unanimously on 21 December 1998. After expressing concern at the crisis and humanitarian situation in Guinea-Bissau, the Council called for the immediate establishment of a government of national unity in the National People's Assembly and the holding of elections by the end of March 1999.

== Background ==
The civil war was triggered by an attempted coup d'état against the government of President João Bernardo Vieira led by Brigadier-General Ansumane Mané in June 1998. Clashes between government forces, backed by neighbouring states, and the rebels eventually resulted in a peace agreement in November 1998, which provided for a national unity government and new elections in the next year. A subsequent, brief outbreak of fighting in May 1999 ended in Vieira's ouster.

== Resolution ==
The Security Council welcomed agreements signed between the Government of Guinea-Bissau and the self-proclaimed military junta. It called on both to implement the agreements fully, including provisions relating to the maintenance of a ceasefire, the urgent establishment of a government of national unity, the holding of elections by the end of March 1999, the opening of the airport and seaport in the capital Bissau, the removal of foreign troops and the deployment of the Economic Community of West African States Monitoring Group (ECOMOG) from the Economic Community of West African States (ECOWAS). The Council praised the role of ECOMOG, ECOWAS and the Community of Portuguese Language Countries for their efforts in Guinea-Bissau, including the implementation of the Abuja Agreement concerning the security of the Guinea-Bissau/Senegal border and guaranteeing humanitarian aid for the affected civilian population.

Both parties were then called upon to respect human rights, international and humanitarian law and guarantee access for humanitarian organisations. The resolution affirmed that ECOMOG may be required to take action to ensure the safety and freedom of movement of its personnel and requested it to provide monthly reports. The Secretary-General Kofi Annan was asked to make recommendations on a possible role for the United Nations during the peace process and to establish a trust fund for voluntary contributions to ECOMOG.

Resolution 1216 concluded with the Security Council announcing its intention to review the situation, based on a report of the Secretary-General and the implementation of the current resolution, by the end of March 1999.

== See also ==
- History of Guinea-Bissau
- List of United Nations Security Council Resolutions 1201 to 1300 (1998–2000)
- United Nations Peacebuilding Support Office in Guinea-Bissau
