= Antonio Indjai =

Bissau-Ginean former army chief of staff

Army of Guinea-Bissau Chief of Staff
- In office 2010–2014

Personal details
- Born: Guinea-Bissau
- Children: 4
- Military career
- Rank: General
- Conflicts: Guinea-Bissau Civil War; 2010 Guinea-Bissau military unrest

General Antonio Indjai is a Bissau-Guinean militaryman who was Guinea-Bissau's army chief of staff from 2010 to 2014, and was one of the leaders in the military unrest of 1 April 2010.

Indjai emerged from within the ruling junta during the destructive civil war which lasted from June 1998 to May 1999. In 1999, Indjai was named deputy commander of the northern military zone led by Tagme Na Waie. In 2004, Tagme was promoted to the top army post after the death of army chief General Verissimo Correia Seabra, and Indjai became leader of the northern military zone. In 2006, Indjai was promoted to Colonel as a result of his leadership in the war against a Senegalese separatist group from the Casamance who had set up camp in Guinea-Bissau. In November 2008, Indjai was promoted to brigadier general and deputy army chief.

In August 2021, Antonio Indjai is wanted by the United States for his alleged involvement in drug trafficking and is offering 5 million dollars to whoever will arrest him.

Indjai is married with four children.

== See also ==
- Military of Guinea-Bissau
- 2010 Guinea-Bissau military unrest
