= United Nations Peacebuilding Support Office in Guinea-Bissau =

United Nations Peacebuilding Support Office to Guinea-Bissau
- Abbreviation: UNOGBIS
- Formation: 6 April 1999
- Type: Peacebuilding Mission
- Legal status: Active
- Head: Shola Omoregie
- Parent organization: United Nations Security Council
- Website: http://uniogbis.unmissions.org/

The United Nations Peacebuilding Support Office in Guinea-Bissau (UNOGBIS) was established by the United Nations Security Council in its Resolution 1233 in April 1999 to facilitate the general election and implementation of the Abuja Accord.

This followed a ceasefire agreement signed in Praia on 26 August 1998 reaffirmed on 1 November (known as the Abuja Accord) with the promise of elections with an additional protocol arranging for a government of national unity signed on 15 December and strengthened by United Nations Security Council Resolution 1216. The agreement was overseen by ECOMOG and the Economic Community of West African States (ECOWAS).

The mandate of UNOGBIS was extended following the 1999 elections into the post-electoral period.

There have been numerous reports submitted and meetings of the United Nations Security Council over the years.

The mandate of UNOGBIS was extended and revised in 2004.

Concerns relating to drug trafficking from Latin America were raised as well as financial stability.

It was replaced by the United Nations Integrated Peacebuilding Office in Guinea-Bissau (UNIOGBIS) in 2009.
